= Yasiel Puig =

Cuban-American baseball player (born 1990)

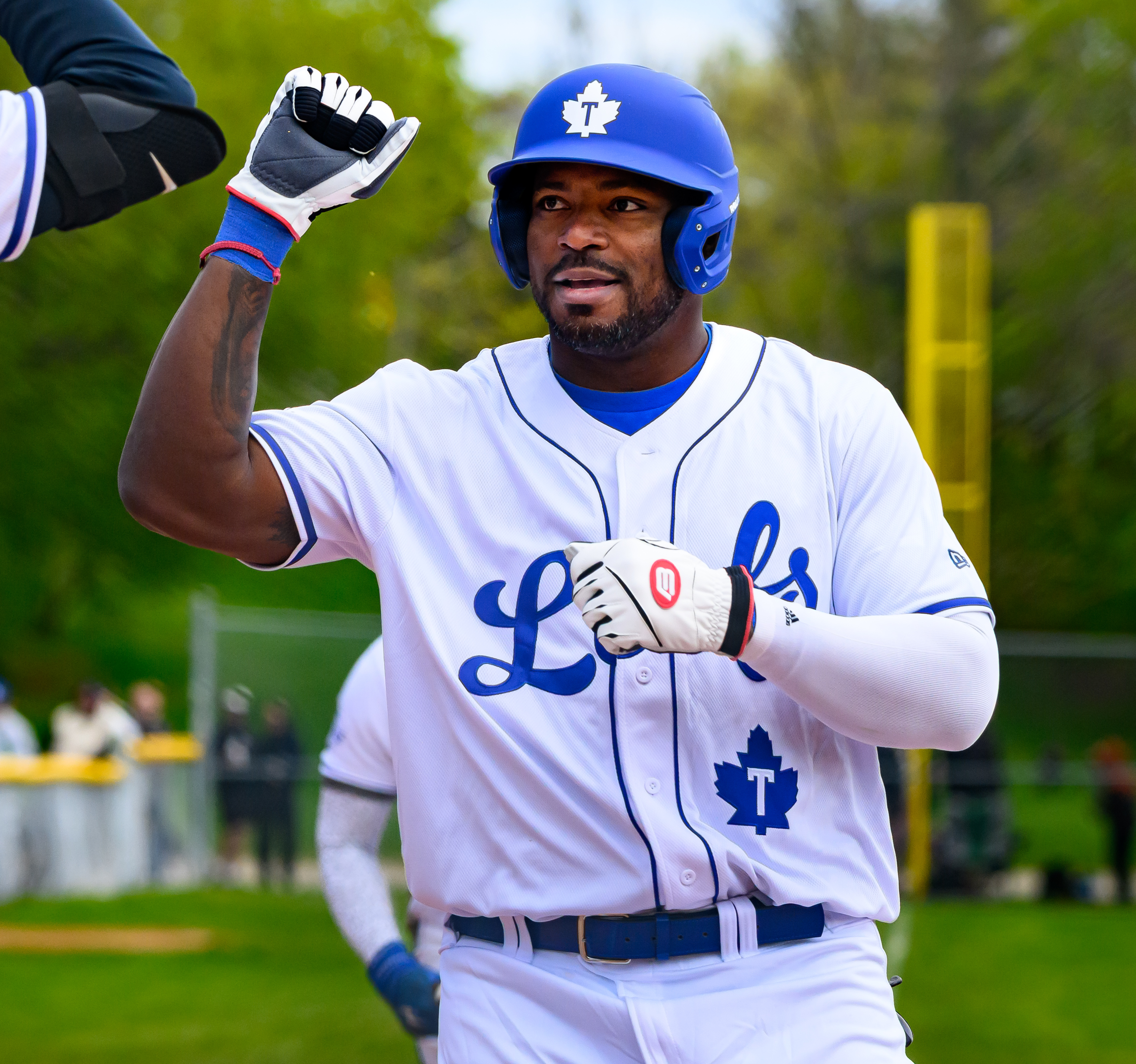
- Puig with the Toronto Maple Leafs in 2026

Toronto Maple Leafs – No. 66
- Right fielder
- Born: December 7, 1990 (age 35); Cienfuegos, Cuba
- Batted: Right Threw: Right

Professional debut
- MLB: June 3, 2013, for the Los Angeles Dodgers
- KBO: April 2, 2022, for the Kiwoom Heroes

Last MLB appearance
- September 27, 2019, for the Cleveland Indians

MLB statistics
- Batting average: .277
- Home runs: 132
- Runs batted in: 415

KBO statistics
- Batting average: .261
- Home runs: 27
- Runs batted in: 93
- Stats at Baseball Reference

Teams
- Los Angeles Dodgers (2013–2018); Cincinnati Reds (2019); Cleveland Indians (2019); Kiwoom Heroes (2022, 2025)

Career highlights and awards
- All-Star (2014)
Medals
Men's baseball
Representing Cuba
World Junior Baseball Championship
Bronze medal – third place	2008 Edmonton	Team

Yasiel Puig Valdés (/ˈjɑːsiɛl ˈpwiːɡ/ YAH-see-el PWEEG, Catalan pronunciation: [ˈput͡ʃ]; born December 7, 1990) is a Cuban-born American professional baseball right fielder for the Toronto Maple Leafs of the Canadian Baseball League. He played in Major League Baseball (MLB) for the Los Angeles Dodgers, Cincinnati Reds, and Cleveland Indians, and in the KBO League for the Kiwoom Heroes. He also played in Mexico, the Dominican Republic, Puerto Rico, and Cuba. His nickname was "the Wild Horse", given to him by longtime Dodgers broadcaster Vin Scully.

Puig played for the Cuba national baseball team in the 2008 World Junior Baseball Championship, winning a bronze medal. He defected from Cuba in 2012 and signed a seven-year, $42 million contract with the Dodgers. He made his MLB debut on June 3, 2013. That season, Puig hit .319 in 104 games with 19 home runs, and was selected by Baseball America to their annual "All-Rookie team". The following season, he started in the All-Star Game. The Dodgers traded Puig to the Reds before the 2019 season, and the Reds traded Puig to the Indians at the 2019 trade deadline.

Puig did not sign with a team in 2020, and played for El Águila de Veracruz of the Mexican League in 2021. He signed with the Heroes for the 2022 season. He played for Veracruz again in 2024 and the Heroes in 2025.

== Early life ==
Yasiel Puig Valdés was born on December 7, 1990, in Cienfuegos, Cuba, the elder of two children of Omar Puig and Maritza Valdés. He has a sister, Yaima. His father was an engineer in a sugar cane factory. He began playing baseball at the age of nine.

== Cuban career ==
Puig played for the Cuba national baseball team when they won the bronze medal in the 2008 World Junior Baseball Championship. He then played for the Cienfuegos team of the Cuban National Series in the 2008–09 Cuban National Series. He batted .276 with five home runs in his debut season. Puig enjoyed a breakout season in the 2009–10 Cuban National Series, with a .330 batting average, 17 home runs, 47 runs batted in (RBIs), and 78 runs scored in 327 at-bats. Puig also played for Cuba in the 2011 World Port Tournament, where he tried to defect along with teammate Gerardo Concepción. Concepción was successful, but Puig was not and was then banned from playing the 2011–12 seasons.

== Defection from Cuba to Mexico ==
Starting in 2009, Puig tried to defect to Mexico 13 times in order to become a legal resident so he could become eligible to sign a contract in Major League Baseball. The first time, police pulled over Puig's car. The second time, the boat failed to arrive. The third time, police raided their safe house and detained them for six days. On the fourth try, the U.S. Coast Guard Cutter Vigilant intercepted their boat near Haiti. The fifth time, he was successfully taken to Mexico by the Los Zetas drug cartel. Yunior Despaigne, a boxer who was formerly on the Cuba national team and had known Puig for years through youth sports academies, said he "[didn't] know if you could call it a kidnapping, because we had gone there voluntarily, but we also weren't free to leave." He added that the cartel threatened to "give him a machetazo" (a whack with a machete) if the payment failed to go through.

Floridian Raul Pacheco, the 29-year-old president of Miami-based T&P Metal and PY Recycling, allegedly paid smugglers $250,000 to get Puig out of Cuba. In exchange, Pacheco would receive 20% of Puig's future earnings after he signed an MLB contract. Pacheco had previously been arrested in 2009 for attempted burglary and in 2010 for using a fake Bank of America credit card to buy $150,000 worth of beer and having in his possession four other fraudulent credit cards and a fake ID card. He was sentenced to two years’ probation. According to court records, Puig has paid Pacheco over $1.3 million. He also paid $400,000 to $500,000 to Alberto Fariñas, the 49-year-old vice president of Pacheco's T&P Metal company, and $600,000 to Marcos González, a Miami lawyer. He also paid an undisclosed amount to Gilberto Suarez, founder of a start-up company called Miami Sport Management. A month after Puig left Cuba, the captain of the smuggling boat, Yandrys León, described as "one of the most important capos of the Cuban-American mafia", was found dead in Cancún.

Cuban boxer Miguel Angel Corbacho Daudinot was sentenced to seven years in prison after Puig allegedly testified against him to the Cuban authorities. In 2013, Corbacho Daudinot's lawyers filed a federal lawsuit against Puig in Miami, claiming Puig delivered false testimony that led to Corbacho Daudinot's imprisonment under "inhumane" conditions, and in so doing violated the Torture Victim Protection Act; the suit sought $12 million in damages.

Puig had been offered to Los Angeles-based agent Gus Dominguez, starting at $175,000, and New York-based agent Joe Kehoskie, starting at $250,000, the latter of whom said that "nobody's going to Cuba [...] and just handing him over to an agent out of the goodness of their heart."

== Professional career ==
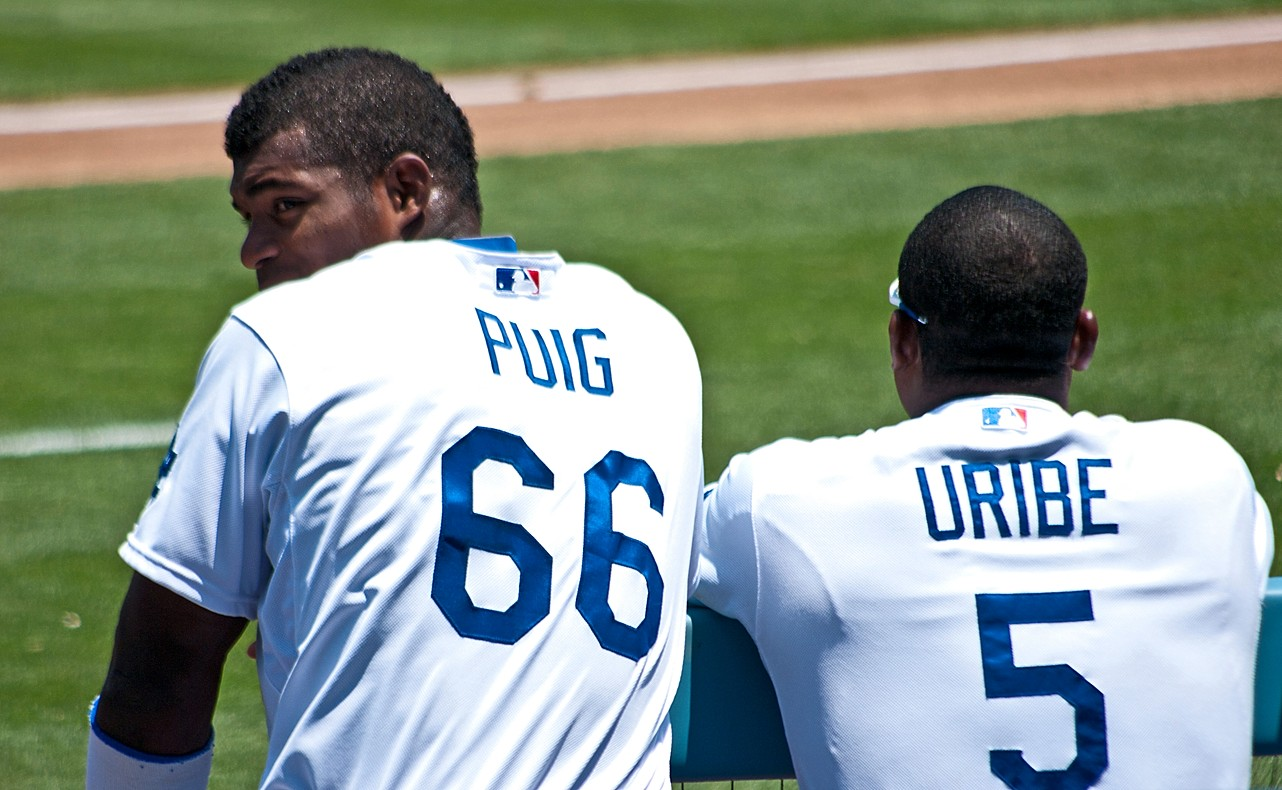
Puig with then teammate Juan Uribe

=== Los Angeles Dodgers (2013–2018) ===
==== Minor leagues ====
The Los Angeles Dodgers signed Puig on June 28, 2012, to a seven-year contract worth $42 million. Eddie Oropesa and Tim Bravo, a special-education teacher from Las Cruces High School in New Mexico, helped the newly arrived Puig adjust to life in the United States during his first year.

The Dodgers placed Puig on the 40-man roster and assigned him to their Arizona Rookie League team. In nine games, he hit .400 with four homers and 11 RBI. On August 13, the Dodgers promoted Puig to the Rancho Cucamonga Quakes of the Class A-Advanced California League. He played in 14 games with the Quakes and hit .327. After the Quakes season, he was scheduled to join the Mesa Solar Sox of the Arizona Fall League, but a staph infection in his right elbow required surgery and sidelined him for several months. After the infection healed, he opted to play winter ball in Puerto Rico to keep his development on schedule.

Puig had a strong spring training with the Dodgers in 2013, hitting .526 in Cactus League games and having some in the press speculate that he might break camp with the Dodgers. However, he was optioned to the Double-A Chattanooga Lookouts just before the end of spring training. He hit .313 with eight home runs and 37 RBI for the Lookouts in 40 games.

==== 2013 ====
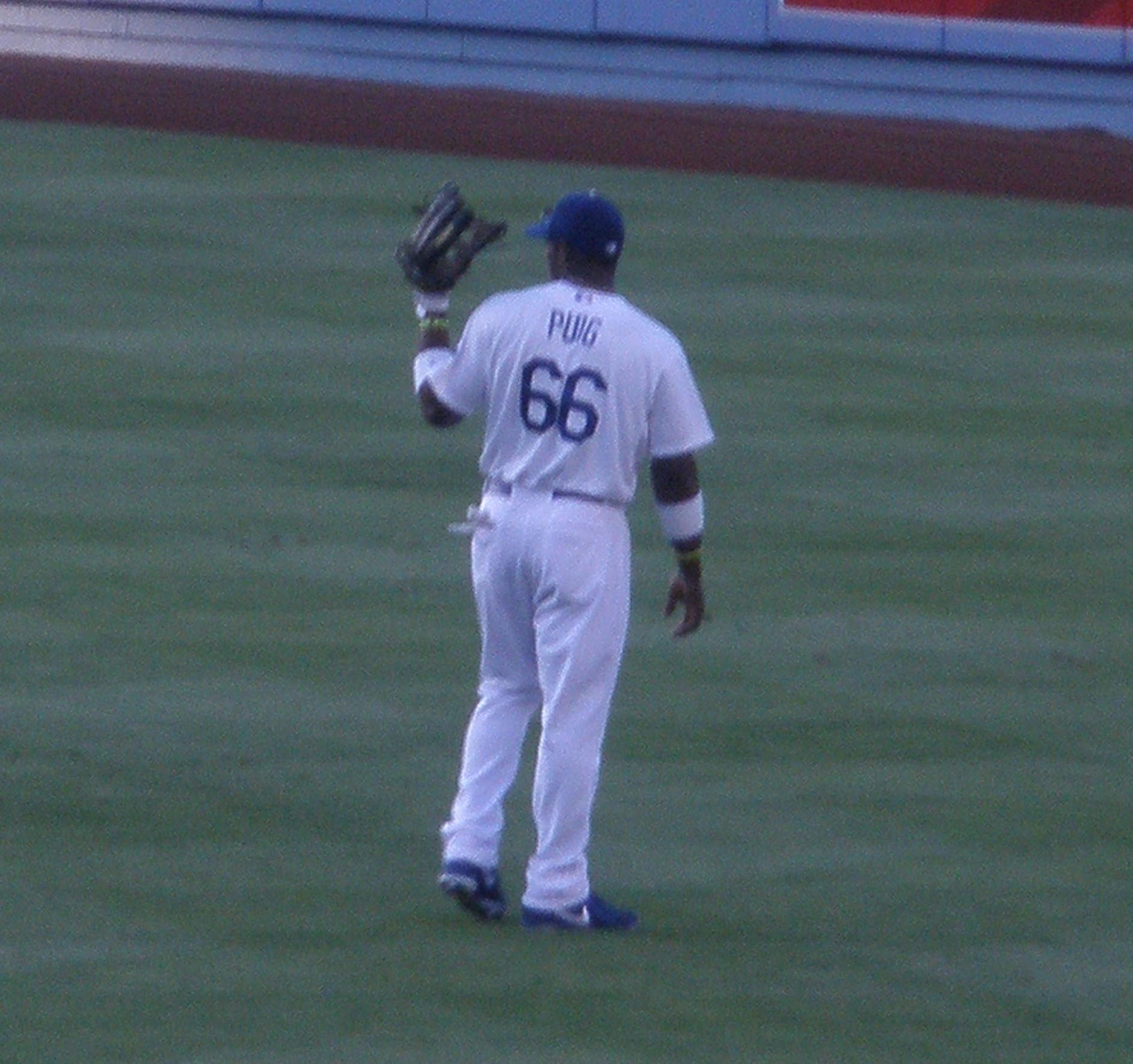
Puig at Dodger Stadium for the 2013 Los Angeles Dodgers

On June 2, 2013, the Dodgers announced they had recalled Puig from Double-A. He made his MLB debut on June 3. In his first at bat, he singled to left-center off Eric Stults of the San Diego Padres. He went 2-for-4 and showed his strong arm by recording an outfield assist on a double play to end the game.

Puig hit two home runs, doubled, and drove in five runs in his second game. He became the first Dodger ever to have a multi-homer game in one of his first two appearances. In his fourth game, on June 6, he hit a grand slam off Cory Gearrin of the Atlanta Braves. Puig was named the National League Player of the Week for the week of June 3–9.

Puig had 27 hits in his first 15 games, tied with Joe DiMaggio (1936) and Terry Pendleton (1984) for second-most all-time behind Irv Waldron (1901) and Bo Hart (2003) with 28. Puig also became the first player in major league history to record at least 34 hits and seven home runs in his first 20 games and set Dodger records for most hits through 20 games (one more than Gibby Brack in 1937) and total bases through 20 games (58, four more than Del Bissonette in 1928). Puig finished June with 44 hits, breaking Steve Sax's 1983 team record for most hits by a rookie in one month. That total was also second all-time for rookies in their first month, behind only DiMaggio who had 48. In 26 games in June, Puig hit .436 with a .467 on-base percentage and a .713 slugging percentage. He won both the National League Rookie of the Month Award and the National League Player of the Month Award, the first time someone had won both in their first month in the majors.

Despite his not making his debut until June, Puig received 842,915 fan write-in votes for the MLB All-Star Game. His name was included among the All-Star Final Vote candidates. In that vote, Puig finished second to Atlanta Braves first baseman Freddie Freeman.

Puig cooled in September, batting .214 in the final month of the season. In 2013, Puig hit .319 in 104 games with 19 home runs and 42 RBIs. He was selected by Baseball America to their annual "All-Rookie team" and finished second in the National League Rookie of the Year voting to fellow Cuban José Fernández. Puig hit well in his first postseason, hitting .333 in 10 games. However, he grounded into a double play in the 9th inning of the team's Game 4 loss in the National League Championship Series (NLCS).

==== 2014 ====
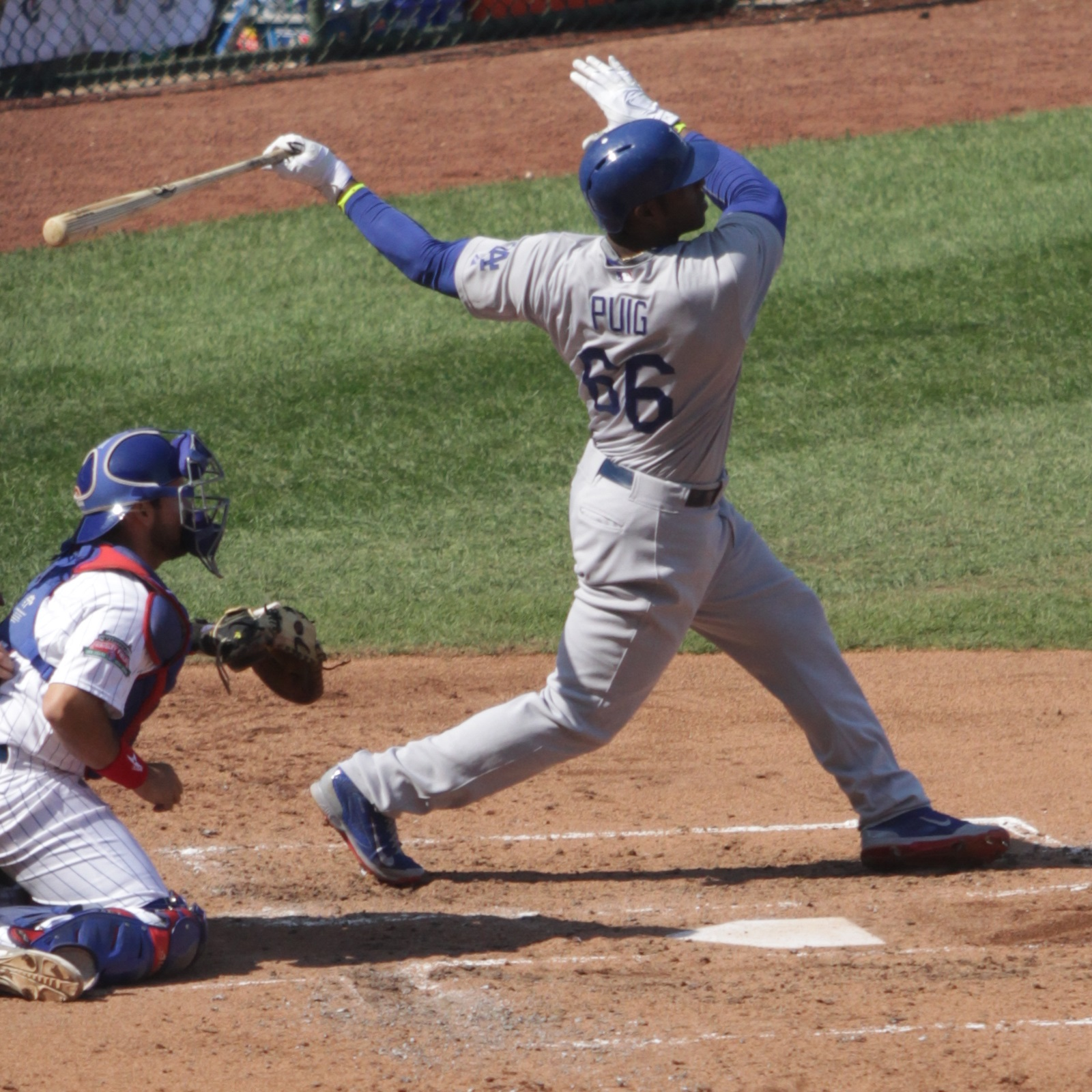
Puig's following a swing for the 2014 Los Angeles Dodgers

On May 17, 2014, Puig had his eighth consecutive game with at least one extra-base hit and at least one RBI, which was a new record for the longest streak by a Dodger, surpassing Pedro Guerrero (1985), Duke Snider (1954), and Howie Schultz (1944). He was selected as the NL Player of the Week for that week and the NL Player of the Month for May after he hit .398 with eight home runs and 25 RBI. Puig was voted and named a starter for the All-Star Game, the youngest Dodger starter for an All-Star game since Steve Sax in 1982. Puig also participated in the Home Run Derby.

On July 25, Puig went 4-for-5 with a career-high four extra-base hits, tying the Dodgers' single-game record with three triples, matching Jimmy Sheckard. Puig's teammates Matt Kemp and Dee Gordon each recorded one triple as well, tying the club's single-game triples record of five, set in 1902 and 1921.

Puig finished the 2014 regular season with 16 home runs and 69 RBI, and a .296 batting average. In the National League Division Series (NLDS) against the St. Louis Cardinals, Puig struck out seven times in a row over the first three games of the series. He then hit a triple and scored the Dodgers' only run in a 3–1 loss.

Puig was selected to travel to Japan after the season for the 2014 MLB Japan All-Star Series, playing against All-Stars of Nippon Professional Baseball.

==== 2015 ====
Puig began the 2015 season experiencing left hamstring issues that caused him to miss several games. On April 26, Puig was placed on the 15-day disabled list for the first time in his major league career, due to his nagging left hamstring. He rejoined the Dodgers roster on June 6. On August 18, Puig injured his right hamstring, and he was placed on the 15-day disabled list nine days later. He returned on October 3, appearing in the final two games of the season. He played in a total of 79 regular-season games. He batted .255/.322/.436, and he had 11 home runs, 38 RBIs, and three stolen bases — all career lows. He batted 0-for-6 in three NLDS games, starting once.

==== 2016 ====
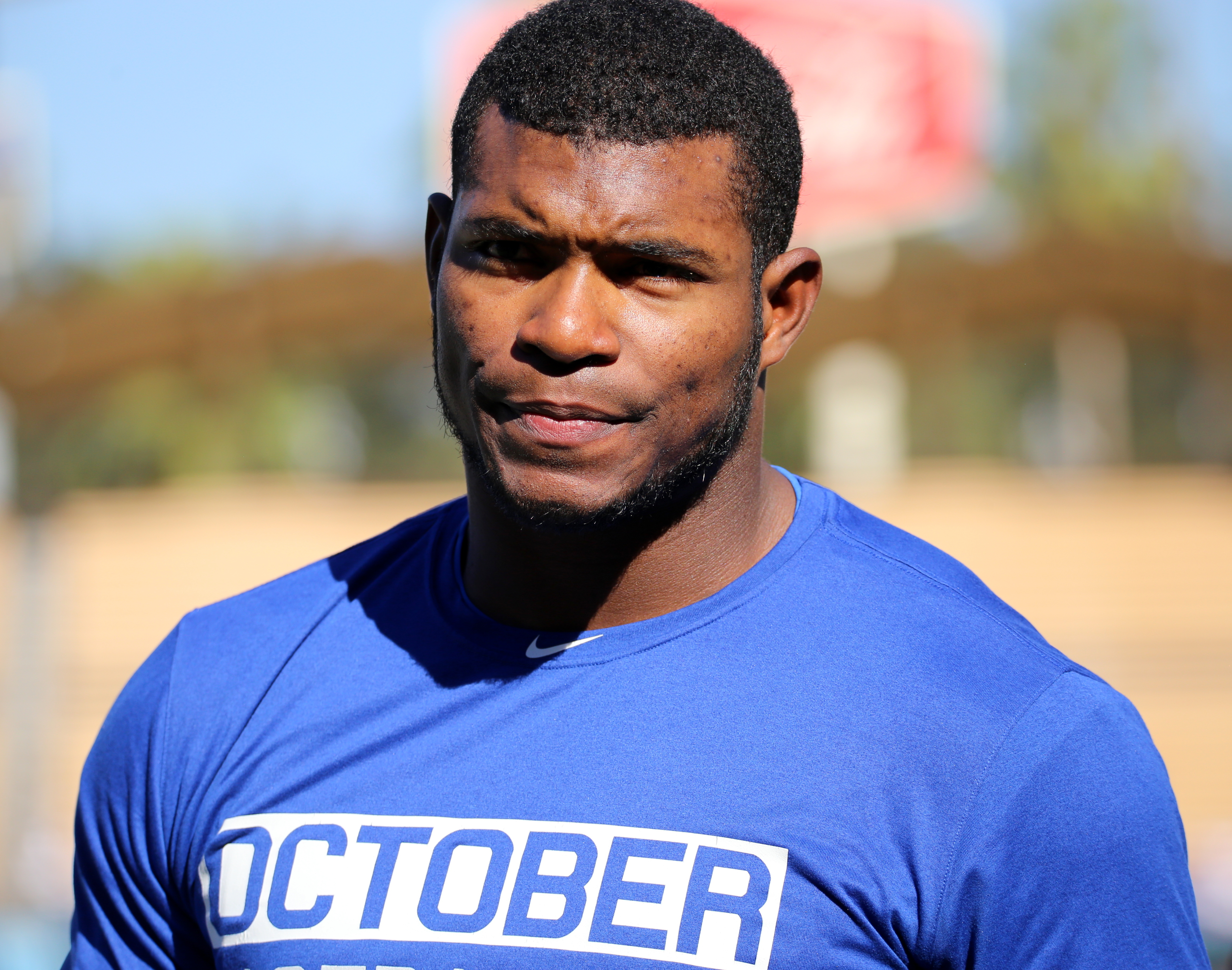
Puig in 2016

In the 2016 season, Puig was again hampered by hamstring issues which reduced his playing time and production. He hit .260 with seven home runs in 81 games through the end of July. On August 2, he was optioned to the Triple-A Oklahoma City Dodgers when the Dodgers acquired Josh Reddick in a trade to take over the right field position. ESPN reported that Puig was told by the team on August 1, the day of the trade deadline, not to join the Dodgers on the road since he would either be traded or demoted. He rejoined the team in September and hit .263/.323/.416 on the season in 104 games with 11 home runs and 45 RBIs. He batted .211 (4-for-19) with a run scored in 10 postseason games.

==== 2017 ====
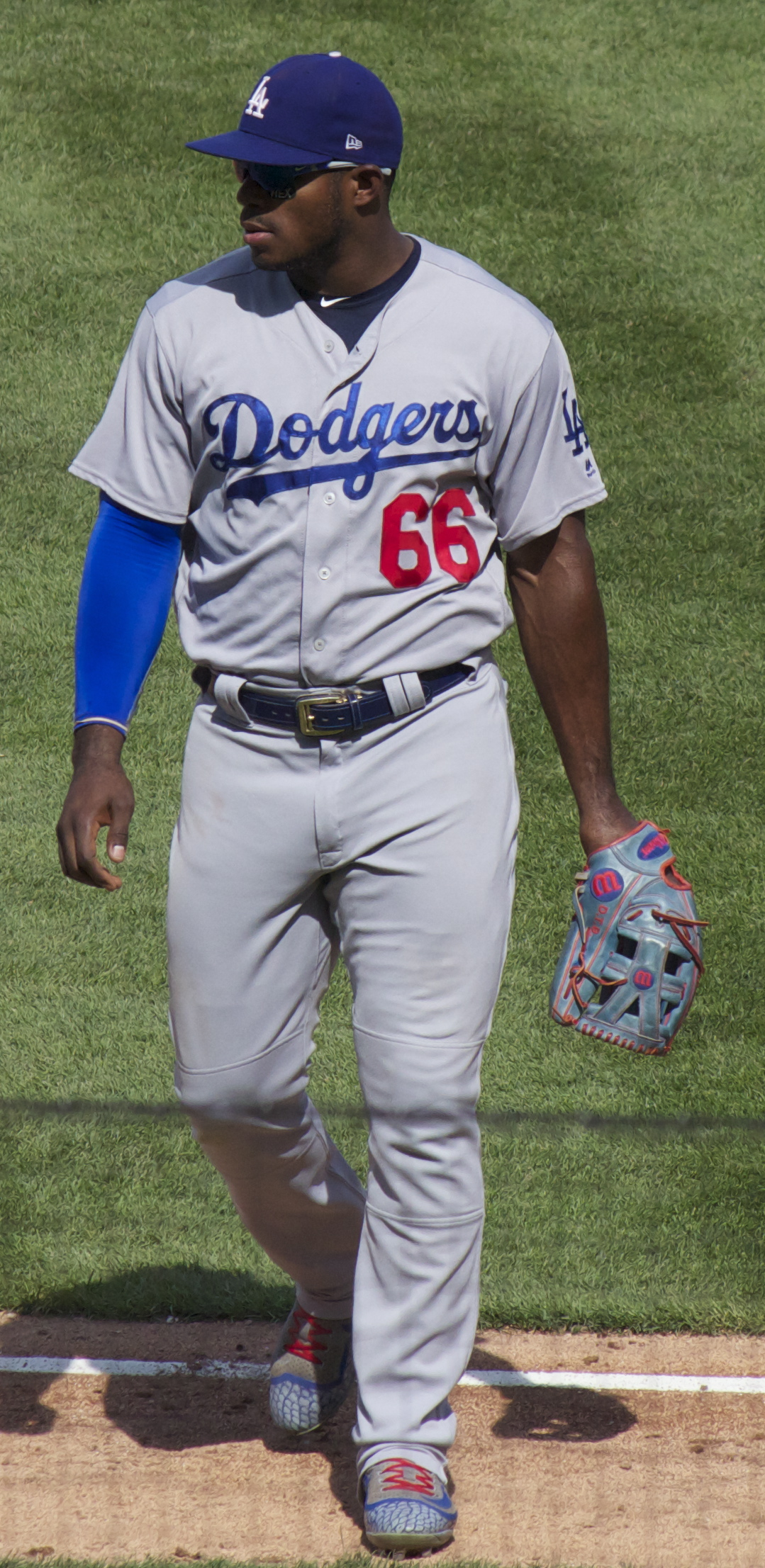
Puig with the Dodgers in 2017

On June 13, 2017, Puig gave the middle finger to fans at Progressive Field in Cleveland after hitting a home run. The next day, he was suspended for a game. However, his suspension was rescinded following his appeal, and he instead made a charitable donation. For the season, he batted .263/.346/.487 with 28 home runs (a career high), 74 RBI, and 15 stolen bases. He received the Wilson Defensive Player of the Year Award for his play in right field. He had a strong start to the postseason, hitting .455 in the NLDS and .389 with a home run in the NLCS. In the World Series, he had only four hits, including two home runs, in 27 at-bats (.148 average) as the Dodgers lost the series in seven games to the Houston Astros.

==== 2018 ====
On February 7, 2018, Wasserman Media Group announced that it had "terminated its professional relationship" with Puig. He was without representation until April, when he signed with Beverly Hills Sports Council. On April 28, Puig left a game due to left hip soreness. The injury occurred while he was making a catch against the outfield wall. He was placed on the 10-day disabled list the next day. On August 11, Puig hit his 100th career home run off Kyle Freeland of the Colorado Rockies. On August 14, Puig got into an altercation with Nick Hundley at home plate. After fouling off a pitch, Puig threw his bat up and snatched it out of the air in frustration feeling like he had a good pitch to hit. Hundley took exception to Puig's actions and the two had words. Puig then shoved Hundley, causing a bench-clearing brawl. Both Hundley and Puig were ejected. In 2018, Puig had the lowest fielding percentage among all major league outfielders. Throughout the season, he struggled against left-handed pitching.

In Game 7 of the NLCS, Puig hit a three-run home run to extend the Dodger lead to 5–1 against the Milwaukee Brewers in a game they would win for their second consecutive pennant. In Game 4 of the World Series, Puig hit a three-run home run off Eduardo Rodriguez to increase the Dodger lead to 4–0, although the Boston Red Sox would win the series in five games.

=== Cincinnati Reds (2019) ===
On December 21, 2018, the Dodgers traded Puig to the Cincinnati Reds, along with Matt Kemp, Alex Wood, Kyle Farmer, and cash considerations for Homer Bailey, Jeter Downs, and Josiah Gray.

Puig was involved in bench-clearing brawls in two Reds losses to the Pittsburgh Pirates in 2019. The first one in the top of the fourth inning of a 7–5 defeat at PNC Park on April 7, 2019, resulted in an ejection and a two-game suspension for extending hostilities. The second brawl was just under four months later on July 30 in the top of the ninth of an 11–4 loss at Great American Ball Park, minutes after news broke that he was going to be traded to the Cleveland Indians.

=== Cleveland Indians (2019) ===
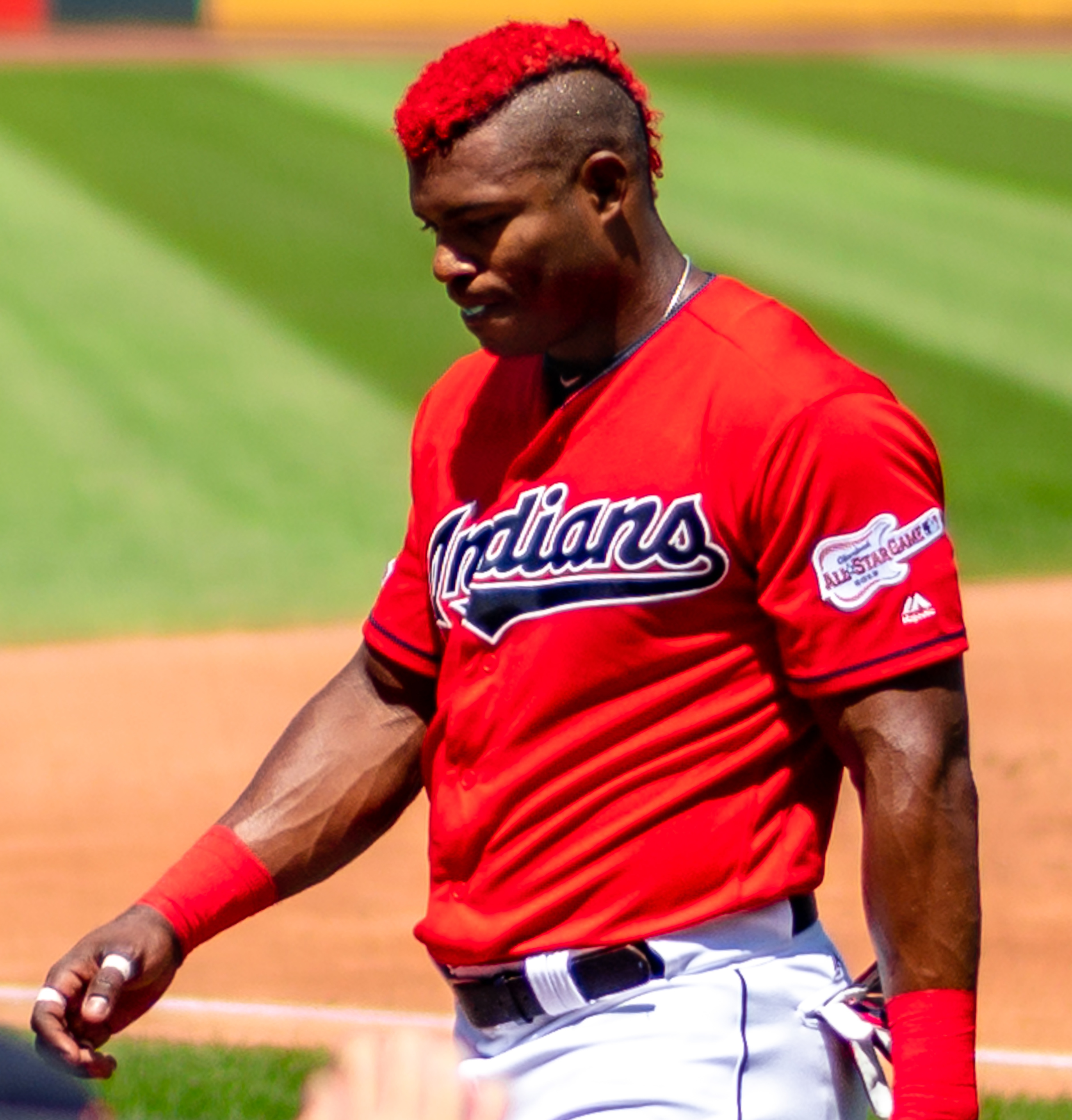
Puig at Progressive Field in 2019

The three-team trade sending Puig to the Indians became official the following day, July 31, 2019. The Indians also acquired Scott Moss from Cincinnati and Franmil Reyes, Logan Allen, and Victor Nova from the San Diego Padres, the Reds acquired Trevor Bauer from Cleveland, and San Diego acquired Taylor Trammell. On August 1, Puig was suspended for three games due to his role in a brawl during a game against the Pittsburgh Pirates while playing for the Reds. He did not appeal the suspension, which he served starting on August 12. He batted .297/.377/.423 with 2 home runs in 49 games with Cleveland. He became a free agent after the season.

On July 17, 2020, Puig tested positive for COVID-19, nixing a deal he was expected to sign with the Atlanta Braves. After not playing organized baseball in the 2020 season, he played winter ball with Toros del Este of the Dominican Professional Baseball League.

=== El Águila de Veracruz (2021) ===
On April 21, 2021, Puig announced via Twitter that he signed with El Águila de Veracruz of the Mexican League. In 62 games with the team, Puig batted .312/.409/.517 with 10 home runs and 43 RBI in 247 plate appearances. He was named as the Defensive Player of the Year following the season.

=== Kiwoom Heroes (2022) ===
On December 8, 2021, Puig signed a one-year, $1 million contract with the Kiwoom Heroes of the KBO League. In 126 games, Puig batted .277/.368/.474 with 21 home runs and 73 RBI in 547 plate appearances.

=== El Águila de Veracruz (2024) ===
On March 16, 2024, Puig signed with El Águila de Veracruz of the Mexican League. In 64 games for Veracruz, he slashed .314/.410/.610 with 18 home runs, 43 RBI, and one stolen base.

=== Kiwoom Heroes (2025) ===
On November 14, 2024, Puig announced on social media that he had signed with the Kiwoom Heroes of the KBO League. He made 40 appearances for Kiwoom in 2025, slashing .212/.285/.340 with six home runs and 20 RBI. On May 19, Puig stated that he had been released by the Heroes and would be returning to the United States for treatment of a shoulder injury.

=== Toronto Maple Leafs (2026–present) ===
On April 23, 2026, Puig signed with the Toronto Maple Leafs of the Canadian Baseball League. The agreement was reportedly the largest contract in Canadian Baseball League history.

Puig hit two home runs and walked twice in his first game for the Maple Leafs at Christie Pits in Toronto.

== International career ==
As part of the Cuba national under-18 baseball team, Puig won a bronze medal at the 2008 World Junior Baseball Championship. He also played for Cuba at the 2011 World Port Tournament in Rotterdam, the Netherlands, where the team finished second.

== Personal life ==
Puig has four sons.

On August 14, 2019, Puig became a United States citizen.

=== Legal issues ===
In April 2013, Puig was charged with reckless driving and speeding in Chattanooga, Tennessee, after allegedly driving 97 miles per hour (156 km/h) in a 50 mph (80 km/h) zone on Amnicola Highway. The charges were dismissed after he served 12 hours of community service. On December 28, 2013, Puig was again arrested for reckless driving after allegedly driving 110 mph (180 km/h) in a 70 mph (110 km/h) zone, in Naples, Florida. He was taken to the Collier County Jail and released after posting bail. Prosecutors elected to drop the reckless driving charge on January 28, 2014, after concluding that there was insufficient evidence to support it.

In March 2021, ESPN reported that MLB investigators had interviewed a woman who said Puig had sexually assaulted her in a Staples Center bathroom during a Los Angeles Lakers game in October 2018. Puig has denied the allegations, calling them "false and malicious". The woman did not file a police report but later filed a lawsuit. In October 2021, Puig announced that he had settled his sexual assault lawsuit and wished to return to MLB in 2022.

In December 2021, The Washington Post reported that Puig had secretly settled a lawsuit filed by two women who claimed that Puig sexually assaulted them in January 2017. Despite the allegations, Puig had not been put on leave, and the lawsuit was not publicized. As part of the disclosure from the 2020 lawsuit, Puig's attorneys claimed that Puig was insolvent and that his earlier career earnings were nearly exhausted. The latest settlement was for $250,000, with the accuser paying her own attorney's fees, due to fears that Puig had nothing left to offer had the accuser held out for more.

In November 2022, Puig agreed to plead guilty to lying to federal law enforcement officers regarding bets that he placed with an illegal sports betting operation. He faced up to five years in prison. Later that month, he changed his plea to not guilty. In 2025, a federal appeals court agreed with a trial court ruling that Puig's plea deal had not been accepted by a court. He still faced a jury trial regarding the illegal bets, from which he allegedly incurred $282,900 in gambling debts.

On February 6, 2026, Puig was found guilty of two federal charges: making false statements to investigators and obstructing justice. The guilty findings could result in up to 20 years imprisonment; sentencing was set for May 26, 2026, but was later pushed back to June 30, 2026, following a post-trial acquittal motion from Puig. On June 26, 2026, Judge Dolly M. Gee agreed to a request from Puig to postpone his sentencing from June 30, 2026, to July 28, 2026, to give him more time to report his finances to the court.

=== Philanthropy ===
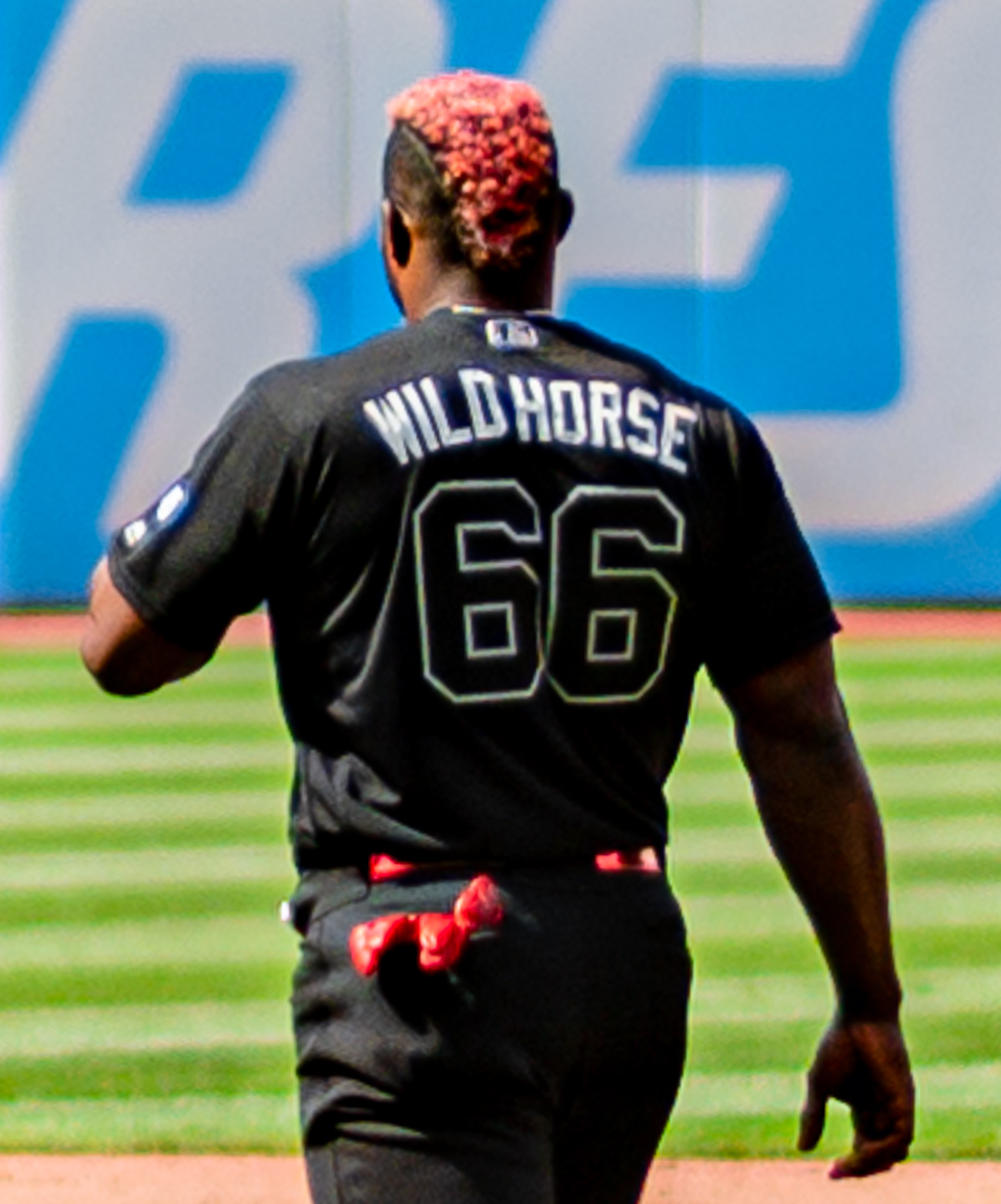
Puig wearing a "Wild Horse" jersey in 2019.

Puig created the Wild Horse Children's Foundation in 2016. The foundation's name embraces the nickname Vin Scully gave him in 2013. According to its website, the foundation aimed to inspire children and families in underserved communities by promoting healthier and better-quality lives through education, sports, community development, and health and wellness programs.

On April 19, 2018, Puig and the Wild Horse Children's Foundation announced a collaboration with the City of San Fernando, California to renovate Pioneer Park and refurbish a dilapidated house on-site that had been boarded up for nearly 10 years.

At a game in New York in May 2019, Puig met a young fan about to have his 40th surgery, due to hydrocephalus. The following month, Puig treated the fan and his family to a Reds game in Cincinnati.

On an off-day in New York between two Indians' series (one with the Mets and one with the Yankees) in August 2019, Puig paid for a helicopter trip to Camp Simcha, an orthodox Jewish day camp for kids with cancer. He spent four hours with the children there and found it difficult to leave. In a tweet afterward, Puig called it "one of the best days of my life", adding, "you are my inspiration".

== See also ==
- List of baseball players who defected from Cuba

Awards and achievements
Preceded by Domonic Brown; Troy Tulowitzki	National League Player of the Month; June 2013; May 2014	Succeeded by Jayson Werth; Andrew McCutchen
