= Scott Moss =

American baseball player (born 1994)

- Pitcher
- Born: October 6, 1994 (age 30); Boynton Beach, Florida, U.S.
- Bats: Left Throws: Left

Scott Ian Moss (born October 6, 1994) is an American former professional baseball pitcher. Despite spending time on the 40-man rosters of the Cleveland Guardians and Philadelphia Phillies, he never played in the major leagues.

== Amateur career ==
Moss attended DeLand High School in DeLand, Florida. In 2013, as a senior, he went 4–2 with a 0.52 ERA and 70 strikeouts in 40 1/3 innings. He was drafted by the Colorado Rockies in the 38th round of the 2013 Major League Baseball draft, but did not sign and instead chose to enroll at the University of Florida where he played college baseball for the Florida Gators.

Prior to his 2014 freshman season at Florida, Moss tore his ulnar collateral ligament and underwent Tommy John surgery, forcing him to miss all of 2014 as well as all of 2015. Moss returned to action in 2016 as a redshirt sophomore, appearing in 14 games (five starts) in which he went 3–0 with a 1.57 ERA, striking out 31 batters over 23 innings. He was named to the All-SEC Tournament Team after throwing six shutout innings versus the LSU Tigers. After the season, the Cincinnati Reds selected Moss in the fourth round of the 2016 Major League Baseball draft with the 108th overall pick.

== Professional career ==
=== Cincinnati Reds ===
Moss signed with the Reds and made his professional debut with the Billings Mustangs of the Rookie Advanced Pioneer League, going 3–1 with a 2.35 ERA in ten starts. He spent 2017 with the Dayton Dragons of the Single–A Midwest League, where he went 13–6 with a 3.45 ERA in 26 starts and was named an All-Star, and 2018 with the Daytona Tortugas of the High–A Florida State League, pitching to a 15–4 record with a 3.68 ERA in 25 starts. He began 2019 with the Chattanooga Lookouts of the Double–A Texas League, earning All-Star honors.

=== Cleveland Indians ===
On July 31, 2019, the Reds traded Moss (along with Yasiel Puig) to the Cleveland Indians in a three-team trade in which the Indians also acquired Franmil Reyes, Logan Allen, and Victor Nova, the Reds acquired Trevor Bauer, and the Padres acquired Taylor Trammell. Following the trade, Moss was assigned to the Akron RubberDucks of the Double–A Eastern League. After two starts, he was promoted to the Columbus Clippers of the Triple–A International League. Over 26 total starts between Chattanooga, Akron, and Columbus, Moss went 10–6 with a 2.96 ERA, striking out 159 over 130 2/3 innings.

Moss was added to the Indians 40–man roster following the 2019 season. He did not play a minor league game in 2020 due to the cancellation of the minor league season caused by the COVID-19 pandemic. For the 2021 season, he returned to Columbus, now members of the Triple-A East, but pitched only 20 1/3 innings due to a neck injury alongside other undisclosed injuries. He compiled a 7.08 ERA, 29 strikeouts, and 15 walks. Moss was designated for assignment by the newly named Cleveland Guardians on November 19, 2021.

=== Philadelphia Phillies ===
On November 23, 2021, Moss was claimed off waivers by the Philadelphia Phillies. Moss was designated for assignment by the Phillies on March 15, 2022, following the team’s signing of Brad Hand. He was sent outright to the Triple-A Lehigh Valley IronPigs the following day. In 6 games (5 starts) split between the High–A Jersey Shore Blue Claws, Single–A Clearwater Threshers, and rookie–level Florida Complex League Phillies, he accumulated a 7.71 ERA with 8 strikeouts in 11 2/3 innings pitched. He was released by the organization on August 8.

Moss retired following the 2022 season as a result of injuries suffered during his career. He subsequently became a real estate agent in Florida.
