= Taylor Trammell =

American baseball player (born 1997)

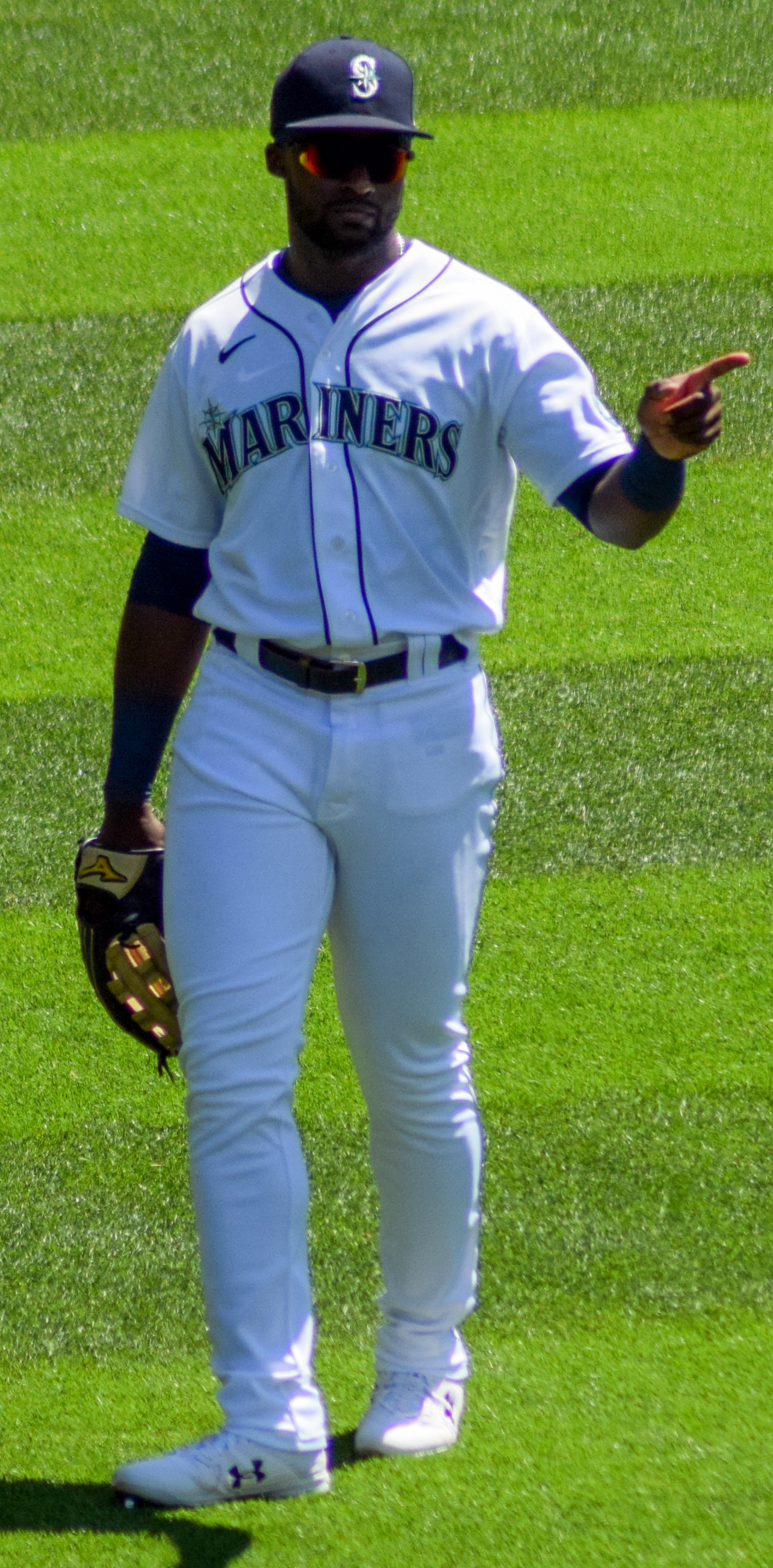
- Trammell with the Seattle Mariners in 2021

Free agent
- Outfielder
- Born: September 13, 1997 (age 29); Powder Springs, Georgia, U.S.
- Bats: Left Throws: Left

MLB debut
- April 1, 2021, for the Seattle Mariners

MLB statistics (through 2026 season)
- Batting average: .182
- Home runs: 26
- Runs batted in: 73
- Stats at Baseball Reference

Teams
- Seattle Mariners (2021–2023); Los Angeles Dodgers (2024); New York Yankees (2024); Houston Astros (2025–2026)

Taylor Walter-Lee Trammell (/trʌˈmɛl/ truh-MEL; born September 13, 1997) is an American professional baseball outfielder who is a free agent. He has previously played in Major League Baseball (MLB) for the Seattle Mariners, Los Angeles Dodgers, New York Yankees, and Houston Astros. He made his MLB debut in 2021.

== Early life ==
Trammell was born in Powder Springs, Georgia, the youngest son of Walter and Cynthia Trammell. His father worked in the U.S. Navy as a linguist and for the U.S. Postal Service. His mother worked at Sam's Club for more than twenty years. His older brother, Kyle, played college football for Mercer.

Trammell attended Mount Paran Christian School in Kennesaw, Georgia. He played both baseball and football. As a junior football player, he scored 13 touchdowns en route to a state championship and hit .500, drove in more than 30 runs and stole more than 30 bases for his travel baseball team. Trammell played in the Under Armour All-America Baseball Game in August 2015. Early in his senior year of high school, he was described in The Atlanta Journal-Constitution as "arguably Georgia's best two-sport stud." As a senior baseball player, he hit .463, stole 29 bases and hit nine home runs. He was also named the high school football Offensive Player of the Year in Georgia's smallest classification after rushing for 2,500 yards and 38 touchdowns. He committed to play college baseball for the Georgia Tech Yellow Jackets.

== Career ==
=== Cincinnati Reds ===
Considered a top prospect for the 2016 Major League Baseball draft, the Cincinnati Reds selected Trammell with the 35th overall pick. He signed with the Reds and was assigned to the Billings Mustangs of the Rookie-level Pioneer League, posting a .303 batting average with two home runs, 34 RBIs, six triples and 24 stolen bases in 61 games. In 2017, he played for the Dayton Dragons of the Single–A Midwest League, where he slashed .281/.368/.450 along with 13 home runs, 77 RBIs and 41 stolen bases in 129 games, and in 2018 he played for the Daytona Tortugas of the High–A Florida State League, batting .277 with eight home runs, 41 RBIs and 25 stolen bases in 110 games. He represented the Reds in the All-Star Futures Game and was named the MVP of the game after hitting a go-ahead home run along with a triple. The Reds invited Trammell to spring training in 2019 as a non-roster player and he began 2019 with the Chattanooga Lookouts of the Double–A Southern League, and again appeared in the All-Star Futures Game.

=== San Diego Padres ===
On July 30, 2019, the Reds traded Trammell to the San Diego Padres in a three-team trade, where the Reds acquired Trevor Bauer and the Indians acquired Yasiel Puig, Scott Moss, Franmil Reyes, Logan Allen, and Victor Nova. The Padres assigned Trammell to the Amarillo Sod Poodles of the Double–A Texas League where he hit .229 in 32 games with four homers and 32 RBI.

=== Seattle Mariners ===
On August 30, 2020, the Padres traded Trammell, Ty France, Andrés Muñoz, and Luis Torrens to the Seattle Mariners in exchange for Austin Nola, Dan Altavilla, and Austin Adams. On November 20, Trammell was added to the 40-man roster.

Trammell made his MLB debut for the Mariners on April 1, 2021, playing center field against the San Francisco Giants. In his debut he was walked twice, including drawing a bases loaded walk in the bottom of the eighth inning for his first major league RBI. Trammell collected his first hit on April 3, an RBI double (off Logan Webb) that scored Evan White, in the bottom of the fourth inning. He hit his first MLB home run off Michael Pineda of the Minnesota Twins on April 10 and appeared in 51 games for Seattle in his rookie campaign, slashing .160/.256/.359 with eight home runs and 18 RBI. In 2022, he played in 43 games for the big league club, but again struggled to a .196/.284/.402 slash with four home runs and 10 RBI.

Before the 2023 season, Trammell underwent surgery to repair a broken hamate bone in his right hand that he suffered after being struck in the hand in a late offseason workout. He was activated off the injured list on April 30 and in his return, hit a grand slam off Chris Bassitt of the Toronto Blue Jays. In 22 games for Seattle, he batted .130/.286/.326 with three home runs and 11 RBI. On March 28, 2024, Trammell was designated for assignment after failing to make Seattle's Opening Day roster.

=== Los Angeles Dodgers ===
On April 2, 2024, Trammell was claimed off waivers by the Los Angeles Dodgers. He had six at-bats in five games for the Dodgers with three strikeouts and was designated for assignment on April 16.

=== New York Yankees ===
On April 18, 2024, Trammell was claimed off waivers by the New York Yankees. In five games for the Yankees, he was used primarily as a defensive replacement, and singled in his only at–bat. Trammell was designated for assignment by New York on May 4. He cleared waivers and was sent outright to the Triple–A Scranton/Wilkes-Barre RailRiders on May 7. As he appeared for both the Yankees and Dodgers in the 2024 season, he was guaranteed a World Series ring from the 2024 World Series regardless of who won. After the season ended, the Yankees re-added Trammell to their 40-man roster.

=== Houston Astros ===
On November 4, 2024, the Yankees traded Trammell to the Houston Astros in exchange for cash considerations. He made 52 appearances for the Astros in 2025, batting .197/.296/.333 with three home runs, 12 RBI, and three stolen bases. On December 5, 2025, Trammell was removed from the 40-man roster and sent outright to the Triple-A Sugar Land Space Cowboys.

Trammell began the 2026 season with Triple-A Sugar Land. On April 10, 2026, the Astros selected Trammell's contract, adding him to their active roster. On June 23, 2026, Trammell hit the final of the three consecutive home runs during the fourth inning versus Shane Bieber at the Rogers Centre, signifying the eighth time in club history a trio of players had done so. Trammell was preceded by Yainer Díaz and Cam Smith. (Note: The most recent instance of the Astros hitting three successive home run was on July 19, 2019, by Jose Altuve, Alex Bregman, and Yordan Alvarez, versus the Texas Rangers.) Trammell appeared in a career-high 99 games in 2026, batting .192/.285/.341/.626, eight home runs and 22 RBI. On November 20, 2026, Trammell was non-tendered by the Astros and became a free agent.

== Personal life ==
Trammell's first child, T. J., was born in September 2026. He proceeded to homer in his first game returned from the paternity list.
