= Trevor Bauer =

American baseball player (born 1991)

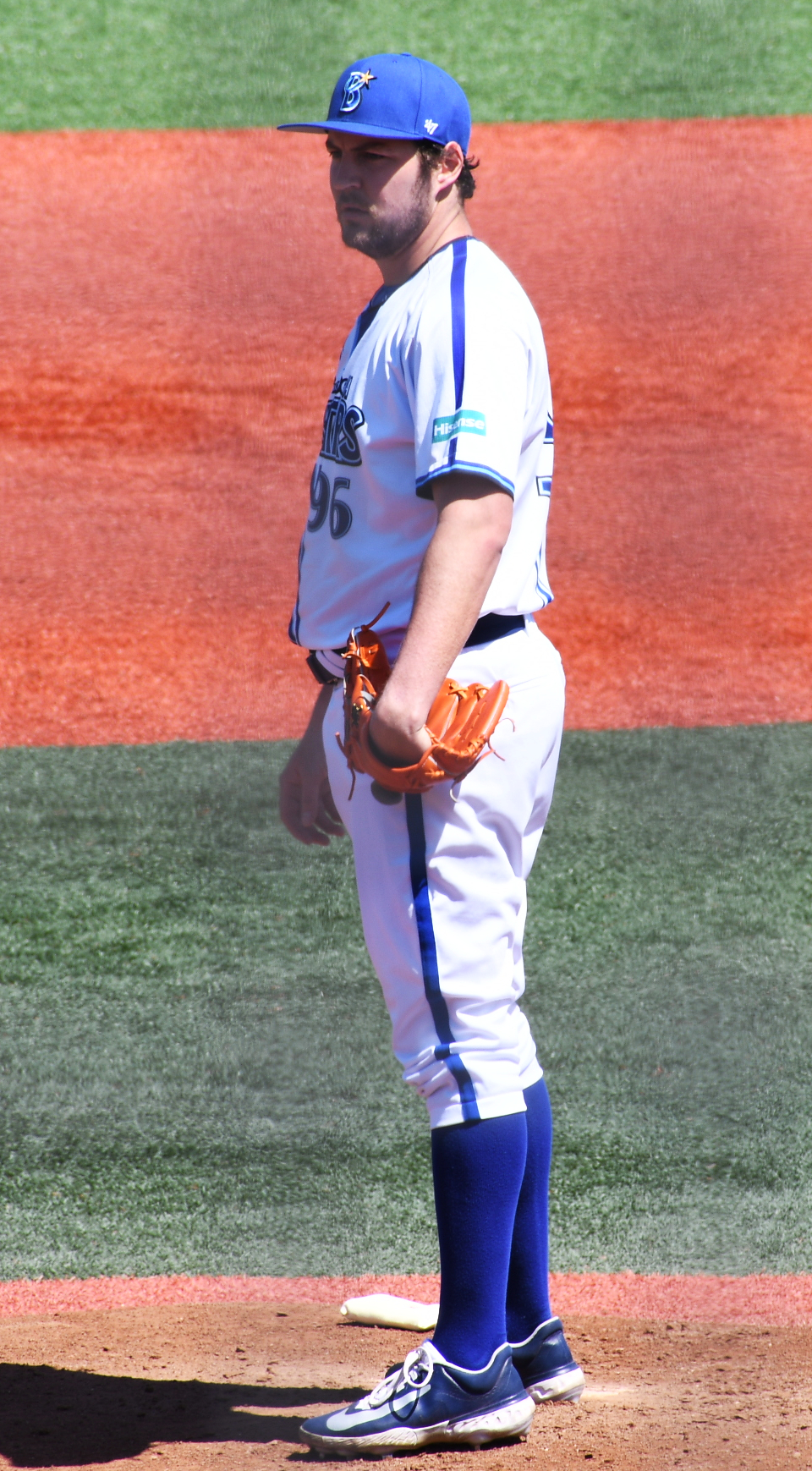
- Bauer with the Yokohama DeNA BayStars in 2023

Estrellas Orientales – No. 96
- Pitcher
- Born: January 17, 1991 (age 35); Los Angeles, California, U.S.
- Bats: Right Throws: Right

Professional debut
- MLB: June 28, 2012, for the Arizona Diamondbacks
- NPB: May 3, 2023, for the Yokohama DeNA BayStars

MLB statistics (through 2021 season)
- Win–loss record: 83–69
- Earned run average: 3.79
- Strikeouts: 1,416

NPB statistics (through 2025 season)
- Win–loss record: 14–14
- Earned run average: 3.78
- Strikeouts: 249
- Stats at Baseball Reference

Teams
- Arizona Diamondbacks (2012); Cleveland Indians (2013–2019); Cincinnati Reds (2019–2020); Los Angeles Dodgers (2021); Yokohama DeNA BayStars (2023, 2025)

Career highlights and awards
- MLB: All-Star (2018); NL Cy Young Award (2020); All-MLB First Team (2020); NL ERA leader (2020); NPB: NPB All-Star (2023)

Trevor Bauer

YouTube information
- Channel: Trevor Bauer
- Genres: Baseball; Blogging; Humor
- Subscribers: 1.19 million
- Last updated: April 2, 2026

Trevor Andrew Bauer (born January 17, 1991) is an American professional baseball pitcher for the Estrellas Orientales of the Dominican Professional Baseball League. He has previously played in Major League Baseball (MLB) for the Arizona Diamondbacks, Cleveland Indians, Cincinnati Reds, and Los Angeles Dodgers.

Bauer and Gerrit Cole helped lead the UCLA Bruins to a 22-game win streak and a College World Series appearance in 2010. The following year, Bauer won both the Golden Spikes Award and the National Pitcher of the Year Award. The Diamondbacks selected him third overall in the 2011 MLB draft. Bauer made his major league debut the following June, becoming the first member of his draft class to reach the majors.

Bauer clashed with his Diamondbacks teammates during the 2012 season. In December 2012, he was traded to the Cleveland Indians. By 2016, he had emerged as a regular force in the Indians' starting rotation. Shortly after his first MLB All-Star Game appearance in 2018, Bauer's career trajectory was interrupted by a stress fracture that kept him out of the rotation until the end of the season. Bauer struggled during the 2019 season and was traded to the Cincinnati Reds in July. During the pandemic-shortened 2020 season, Bauer became the first Reds player to win the Cy Young Award. Bauer became a free agent after the 2020 season and signed a three-year contract with the Dodgers in February 2021. He led the National League in both strikeouts and innings pitched through July 2, but spent the rest of the season on administrative leave as MLB investigated sexual assault allegations against him.

On April 29, 2022, MLB suspended Bauer for 324 games for violating its Joint Domestic Violence, Sexual Assault and Child Abuse Policy. On appeal, the suspension was reduced to 194 games. Bauer has not been criminally charged in connection with the sexual assault allegations and has contended that his contact with his accuser was consensual. The Dodgers released him on January 12, 2023. Subsequently, Bauer has played for the Yokohama DeNA BayStars of Nippon Professional Baseball (NPB, Diablos Rojos del México of the Mexican League (LMB), the Long Island Ducks, and the Estrellas Orientales.

== Early life ==
Bauer was born on January 17, 1991, in North Hollywood, California. From a young age, Bauer was fascinated by baseball pitchers like Atlanta Braves players Tom Glavine, Greg Maddux, and John Smoltz. His parents Warren and Kathy paid for pitching lessons from a private coach, and in his free time, he would practice pitching against the fence of a local tennis court. Bauer had few friends in school and experienced bullying for his obsession with baseball. He continued to practice his technique at William S. Hart High School in Santa Clarita, and he spent the summers at a baseball camp in Texas. As a junior in 2008, Bauer posted a 12–0 win–loss record with a 0.79 earned run average (ERA), and his fastball reached speeds of up to 92 mph (148 km/h). His final high school game was a playoff shutout against Canyon Springs High School that Hart took 4–0. Bauer chose to graduate after his junior season, in part because he meshed poorly with many of his teammates, including future Major League Baseball (MLB) player Mike Montgomery.

== College career ==
After graduating from high school, Bauer attended the University of California, Los Angeles (UCLA) to study mechanical engineering. There, he joined the UCLA Bruins baseball team in the same class as Gerrit Cole. The two formed a rivalry that began, according to Bauer, when Cole told him that he had "no future in baseball". At the end of their freshman season in 2009, Bauer led the team with nine wins, a 2.99 ERA. and 105 1/3 innings pitched, also getting named the Pac-10 Conference Baseball Newcomer of the Year.

Cole and Bauer combined in 2010 to push the Bruins to a 10–0 start, the best record to begin the season since the school started keeping track in the 1950s. Bauer was 2–0 with a 2.45 ERA in those first 10 games, and he and Cole combined for 49 strikeouts in 32 2/3 innings. The Bruins ultimately built a 22-game winning streak before April 3, when the Stanford Cardinal were able to capitalize on a fifth-inning error by the UCLA shortstop, as Stanford defeated UCLA 8–4, giving Bauer his first loss in over a year. UCLA continued to dominate in the postseason, with Bauer taking the win in a 10–3 rout of Texas Christian to lead UCLA to its first ever College World Series Championship Series. South Carolina swept UCLA in the best-of-three series to win the championship.

Bauer set a number of UCLA records as a junior in 2011. On March 26, he struck out his 329th college batter in a complete game shutout of the University of Southern California, passing Alex Sanchez' strikeout record from 1987. On April 16, he recorded his 28th career win in a 4–0 victory over the Arizona Wildcats, gaining a 28–7 record and passing Sanchez as the UCLA all-time wins leader. For the season, he led the school with 460 strikeouts, 34 wins, and 373 1/3 innings pitched. For his efforts that year, Bauer won the National Pitcher of the Year Award, awarded by the College Baseball Foundation. He was also the first UCLA player to receive the Golden Spikes Award, given annually to the top amateur baseball player in the United States.

== Professional career ==
=== Arizona Diamondbacks (2011–2012) ===
==== Minor leagues ====
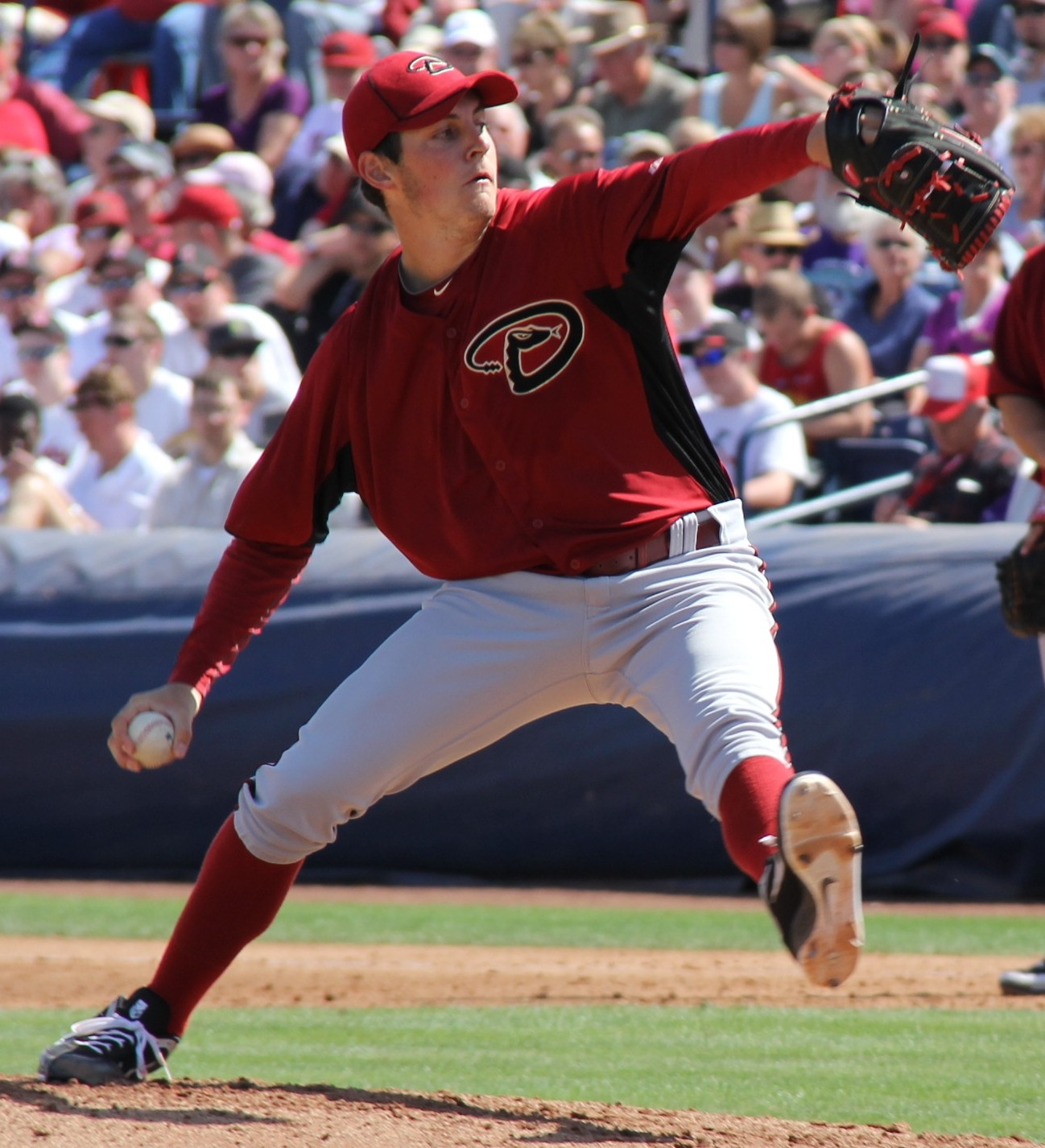

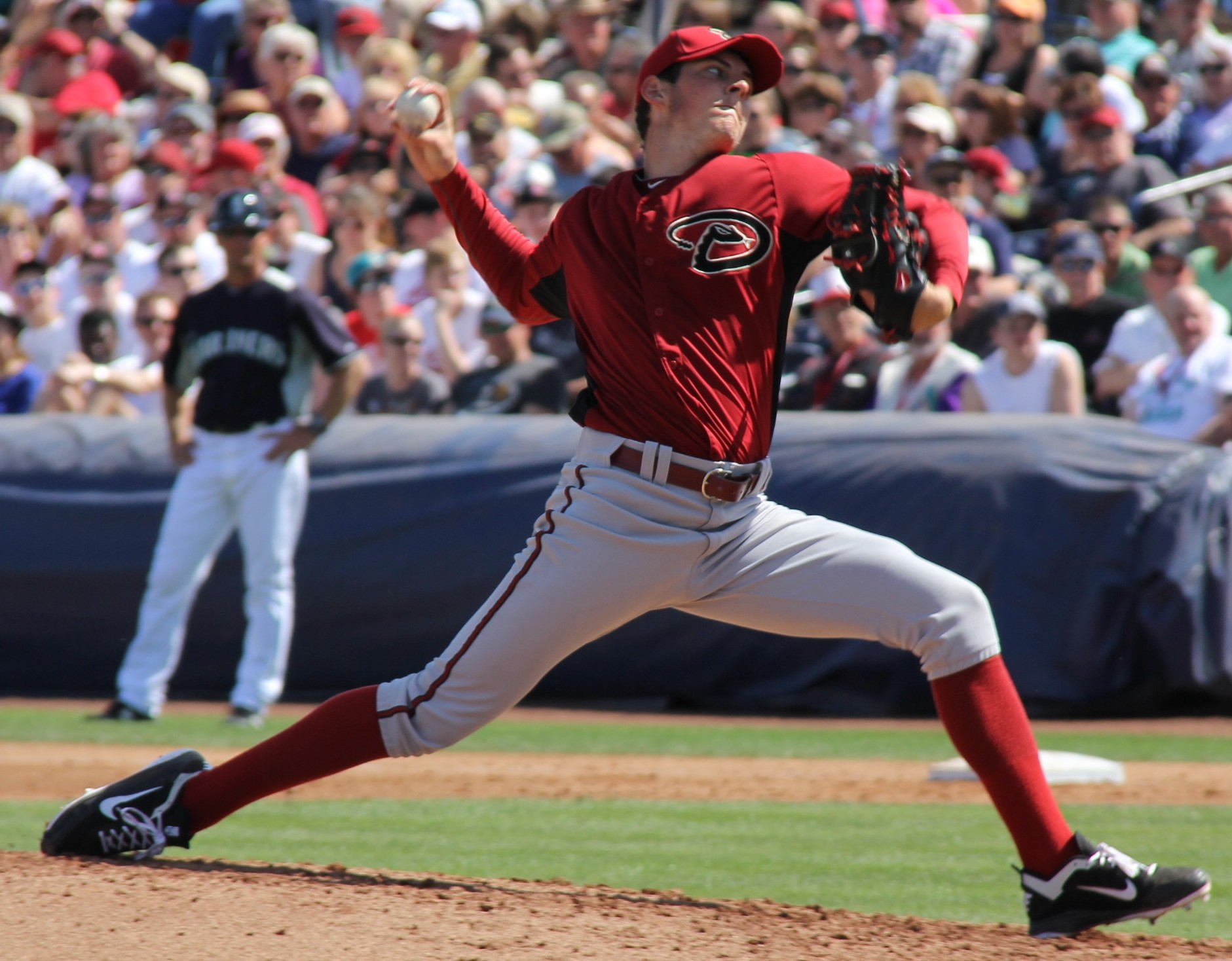
Bauer pitching for the Arizona Diamondbacks at spring training in 2012

While Cole was projected to go first overall in the 2011 MLB draft, Bauer's performance during the 2011 NCAA season saw his stock rise among MLB scouts. As predicted, the Pittsburgh Pirates selected Cole first overall, while Bauer went to the Arizona Diamondbacks two selections later. It was the first time that two college teammates were selected first and third overall in the same MLB draft since 1978 (when the Atlanta Braves took Bob Horner first in the draft and the New York Mets selected Hubie Brooks third overall). Bauer signed with the Diamondbacks on July 25 and was subsequently assigned to the Class A-Advanced Visalia Rawhide of the California League. He made only three appearances with Visalia, pitching 14 innings and allowing three runs before being promoted to the Double-A Mobile BayBears that August. Bauer debuted with Mobile on August 16, striking out eight batters and allowing five hits in five innings of work. Bauer picked up his first professional baseball win on August 20, pitching five innings in Mobile's 13–6 victory over the Jacksonville Suns. In four starts with the BayBears that year, Bauer went 1–1 with a 7.56 ERA, striking out 26 batters in 16 2/3 innings of work.

Bauer entered the 2012 season as the Diamondbacks' top-rated prospect, and the ninth overall prospect in MLB. He received an invitation to the Diamondbacks' spring training and went 1–0 with a 3.60 ERA in 10 Cactus League innings. Ultimately, however, Bauer failed to displace Josh Collmenter in Arizona's starting rotation, and was assigned back to Double-A Mobile shortly before Opening Day. He made eight more starts in Double-A, going 7–1 with a 1.68 ERA and striking out 60 batters in 48 1/3 innings, before receiving a promotion to the Triple-A Reno Aces on May 17. At the time of his promotion, he led the Southern League in wins, strikeouts, and ERA. Bauer was selected to pitch in the 2012 All-Star Futures Game, but was unavailable as the Diamondbacks had called him up to the major leagues. (His replacement was Tyler Skaggs). At the time, he had a combined 11–1 record and 2.23 ERA between Reno and Mobile.

==== Major leagues ====
On June 27, 2012, the Diamondbacks called Bauer up from Reno in order to replace an injured Joe Saunders. He was scheduled to start the next day, becoming the first member of the 2011 draft class to make his MLB debut. Although the Diamondbacks defeated the Atlanta Braves 3–2, Bauer earned a no-decision in his major league debut, pitching four innings before suffering a groin strain that required him to leave the mound. He picked up his first win on July 8, holding the Los Angeles Dodgers to six scoreless innings as the Diamondbacks ultimately won 7–1. After four major league starts, during which Bauer went 1–2 with a 6.06 ERA, he was sent back down to Reno, where he was shut down for a period of two weeks in order to preserve his health during his first full season of professional baseball. He finished the season there, helping the Aces reach their first Pacific Coast League and Triple-A baseball championships. In the championship game against the Pawtucket Red Sox of the International League, Bauer took another no decision as he allowed two runs in 4 2/3 innings. In 14 total starts for Reno, Bauer posted a 5–1 record and a 2.85 ERA, striking out 97 batters in 82 innings.

=== Cleveland Indians (2013–2019) ===
==== 2013–14 ====
On December 11, 2012, Bauer was part of a three-team, nine-player trade between Arizona, the Cincinnati Reds, and the Cleveland Indians. Bauer, fellow Diamondbacks pitchers Matt Albers and Bryan Shaw, and Reds outfielder Drew Stubbs went to Cleveland, who in turn sent Shin-Soo Choo and Jason Donald to Cincinnati, and Tony Sipp and Lars Anderson to Arizona. The Reds also traded prospect Didi Gregorius to the Diamondbacks. After the trade, it was revealed that Bauer had been unpopular with most members of the club. His Diamondbacks batterymate Miguel Montero said that he had struggled to catch for Bauer, as he ignored his pitch calling and would "tell [Montero] how to do [his] job". Diamondbacks president Derrick Hall told reporters that Bauer "had a really tough year" with Arizona, and that the pitcher had apologized for his attitude to several veteran players. That February, Bauer released a rap song on SoundCloud called "You Don't Know Me", a purported diss track against his former teammate.

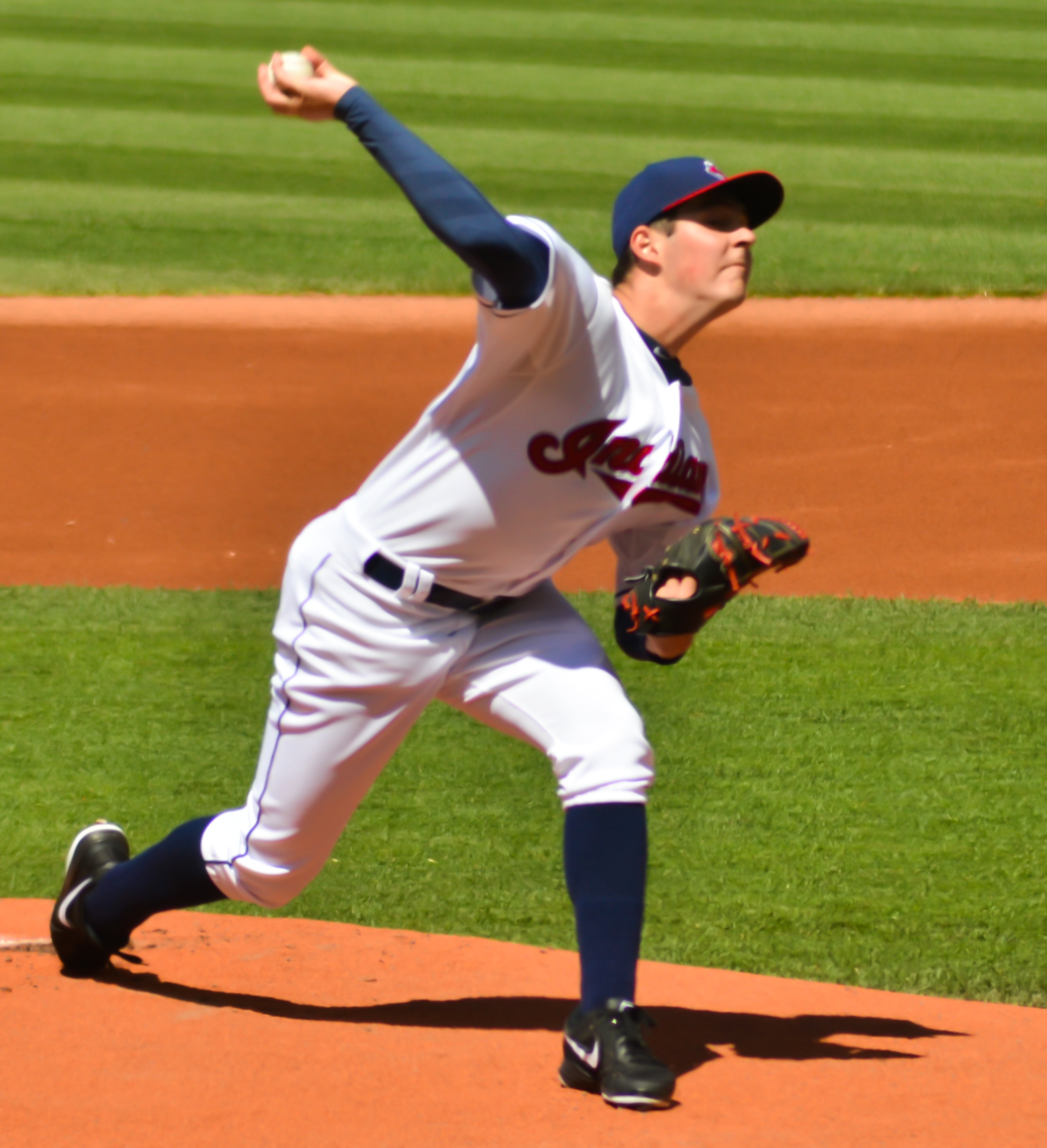
Bauer with the Indians in 2013

Bauer began retooling his pitching delivery after the 2012 season, and entered spring training with the Indians with the intention of "overwrit[ing] eight to 10 years of neuromuscular programming". He was not named to the Indians' 2013 opening day roster, instead making up part of the starting rotation for the Triple-A Columbus Clippers. He was recalled on April 6 for a game against the Tampa Bay Rays, giving up a career-high seven walks in a 6–0 loss. Bauer's difficulties with fastball command carried through the season, and when MLB rosters expanded from 25 to 40 in September, Bauer was not included among the additional 15. He started four major league games that season, posting a 1–2 record and a 5.29 ERA while striking out 11 batters in 17 innings. In his 22 starts for Columbus, meanwhile, Bauer was 6–7 with an ERA of 4.15. He continued to work on his pitching mechanics during the 2013–14 offseason, blaming his poor performance on bad techniques that he had picked up after suffering his groin injury in Arizona.

The Indians optioned Bauer to Columbus at the start of the 2014 season, a decision that they hoped would allow him to become more comfortable pitching in the organization. He received his first call-up of the season on April 8, starting in the second game of a doubleheader against the San Diego Padres. He took the loss in that game despite recording eight strikeouts, but continued to progress in Columbus. On May 20, Bauer received his second call-up of the season, replacing Danny Salazar for a start against Detroit Tigers ace and Cy Young Award winner Justin Verlander. Bauer took the win, giving up only two runs in seven innings of the 6–2 victory. The biggest improvement of Bauer's season was in limiting walks: by June 24, he had lowered his rate of bases on balls per nine innings pitched (BB/9) to 3.4, an improvement over his 8.5 BB/9 during the previous season that he attributed to ironing out his mechanics. Bauer made 26 major league starts in 2014, going 5–8 with a 4.18 ERA and striking out 143 batters in 153 innings.

==== 2015–16 ====
Bauer was named to the Indians' opening day roster for the 2015 season, joining Corey Kluber, Carlos Carrasco, Zach McAllister, and TJ House in the starting rotation. After an April in which he went 2–1 with a 4.19 ERA, Bauer particularly struggled at the start of May, giving up 11 runs in his first 9 1/3 innings of the month. Bauer drew his first hit as a batter on June 16, recording a leadoff single against Jake Arrieta of the Chicago Cubs. He said later that he "didn't think [he'd] ever get a career hit", and that he had closed his eyes while making contact with the ball. On July 28, he pitched his first major league complete game, a 2–1 loss against the Kansas City Royals that pushed Cleveland to an eight-game losing streak at home, their longest in 40 years. As the season progressed, Bauer continued to struggle with allowing home runs, and he was moved to the bullpen on September 17, with Josh Tomlin and Cody Anderson filling his position in the starting rotation. He finished the season with an 11–12 record and a 4.55 ERA, as well as 170 strikeouts in 176 innings. Bauer also led the American League (AL) in walks that season with 79.

Despite a strong spring training run, including six scoreless innings in his final Cactus League start, the Indians assigned Bauer to the bullpen to begin the 2016 season, with Anderson and Tomlin remaining in the rotation. After Carrasco suffered a leg injury on April 25, however, Bauer moved into his place in the rotation. The acquisition of catcher Chris Gimenez from the Texas Rangers on May 4 helped Bauer with his fastball command on the mound. Gimenez had been acquired to replace backup catcher Roberto Pérez, who had broken his thumb. He became Bauer's regular catcher from then on, with Bauer going 3–1 in his first nine starts with Gimenez as his batterymate. His second complete game came on June 22, with a three-hitter against the Tampa Bay Rays to give the Indians a six-game winning streak. Bauer finished the regular season with a 12–8 record, a 4.26 ERA, and 168 strikeouts in 35 games (28 starts) and 190 innings of work. As the Indians advanced through the playoffs, Bauer was scheduled to start Game 2 of the 2016 American League Championship Series (ALCS) against the Toronto Blue Jays, but he suffered an injury to the pinkie finger of his right hand while attempting to repair a homemade drone. He received stitches for the injury and started in Game 3, but MLB prohibits pitchers from using Band-Aids on their hands, and the wound re-opened on the mound. Bauer lasted only 21 pitches, before opposing manager John Gibbons signaled to the umpires: Bauer's blood-dripping finger was also a violation of MLB's rules, and he was forced from the game. The bullpen, starting with Dan Otero, managed to secure a win for the Indians nonetheless. The team went on to take the best-of-seven series in five games, thus advancing to the World Series.

Bauer started Games 2 and 5 of the 2016 World Series, losing both games and posting a 5.40 World Series ERA. The Indians lost a very competitive series in seven games; the series ended in extra innings of the final game.

==== 2017–19 ====
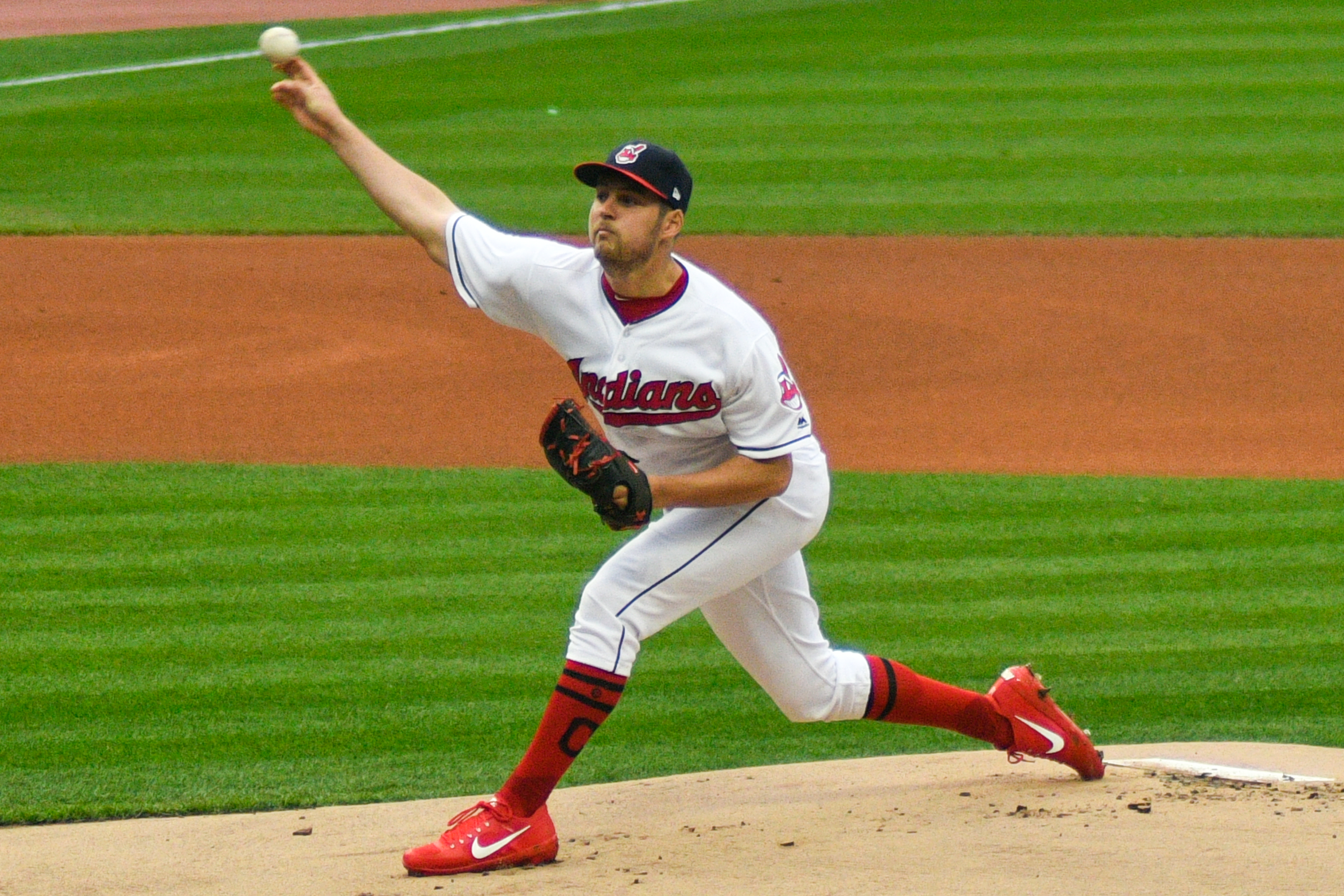
Bauer with the Indians in 2017

On January 12, 2017, Bauer agreed to a one-year, $3.55 million contract with the Indians, twice as much as he had earned the prior season. The first two months of the 2017 season were a disappointment for Bauer, who allowed 11 home runs and 38 earned runs in his first 10 appearances. He described the first half of the season as "miserable", and was often upset when he was scheduled to start, because it "didn't feel like [he] was contributing to the team". The nadir of Bauer's season came on June 16, in his first start after the All-Star Game break, when Bauer allowed four runs, three hits, and two walks before he was taken out of the game in the first inning. The incident was a turning point for Bauer, who turned his season around by posting a 10–1 record and 2.60 ERA in his last 14 starts. In particular, he improved at limiting the damage of home runs against him, increasing the proportion of solo shots to multi-run home runs. By the end of the regular season, Bauer had a 17–9 record and a 4.19 ERA in 32 games, and had struck out 196 batters in 176 1/3 innings. As the Indians stepped into the 2017 American League Division Series (ALDS) against the New York Yankees, manager Terry Francona passed over ace Corey Kluber to give Bauer the start in Game 1, reportedly because the bullpen was very rested and ready, and Kluber the better bet to pitch deep into the game. Bauer recorded eight strikeouts in the game, including three of Yankees slugger Aaron Judge, and was able to carry a no-hitter into the sixth inning. He lasted 6 1/3rd, as the Indians defeated the Yankees 4-0. Bauer's 5 1/3 no-hit innings set an Indians postseason record; previously, Bob Feller and Early Wynn had gone five no-hit innings each in the 1948 World Series and the 1954 World Series, respectively. The Yankees bounced back to win three of the next four games, taking the best-of-five series in five games.

During the 2017–18 offseason, Bauer estimated that he had pitched a total of 40 practice innings with UCLA alumni in order to present a new slider for the 2018 MLB season. The result was a dominant first half of the season, in which Bauer was second in the AL with a 2.24 ERA, third with 175 strikeouts, and third with 4.5 Wins Above Replacement. The Indians, meanwhile, were 7.5 games ahead in the AL Central going into the All-Star break. Bauer received his first All-Star selection in 2018 and was originally meant to begin the tenth inning for the AL team, but manager A. J. Hinch ultimately allowed J. A. Happ of the Toronto Blue Jays to attempt the save. Bauer's push for the AL Cy Young Award was put on pause when he took a line drive to the leg from José Abreu on August 11 during a game against the Chicago White Sox. The hit caused injury and swelling, and an MRI revealed a stress fracture that required a walking boot and four to six weeks of recovery time. Bauer began pitching again on September 22, throwing 1 1/3 scoreless innings of relief against the Boston Red Sox so that Cleveland management could decide whether he would be able to start in a potential postseason run. The Houston Astros took an early lead in the 2018 ALDS, but were able to sweep the Indians after Bauer committed two throwing errors in Game 3 of the series, turning a 2–2 game into an 11–3 rout by Houston.

In his first two starts of the 2019 season, Bauer went 14 innings, striking out 17 batters and allowing only one hit. In addition to starting the season with a 0.64 ERA, Bauer became the first pitcher in MLB history to begin a season with back-to-back starts of five or more innings while giving up one hit. As the season progressed, Bauer's ERA built to 3.79 with the Indians, and he revealed later that he had only been healthy for one third of his starts. An awkward throw in the fourth inning of his fourth game of the season had partially torn the ligaments in his ankle, and as he changed his stance to compensate for the injury, he began to suffer back spasms. After recovering from the injuries, he fell ill. On July 28, after allowing the go-ahead run in a game against the Kansas City Royals, Bauer became frustrated and threw a ball over the center field fence of Kauffman Stadium. Manager Terry Francona, arriving on the mound to pull Bauer from the game, became angry with the gesture, and Bauer apologized after the game, calling the incident "childish" and "unprofessional".

=== Cincinnati Reds (2019–2020) ===
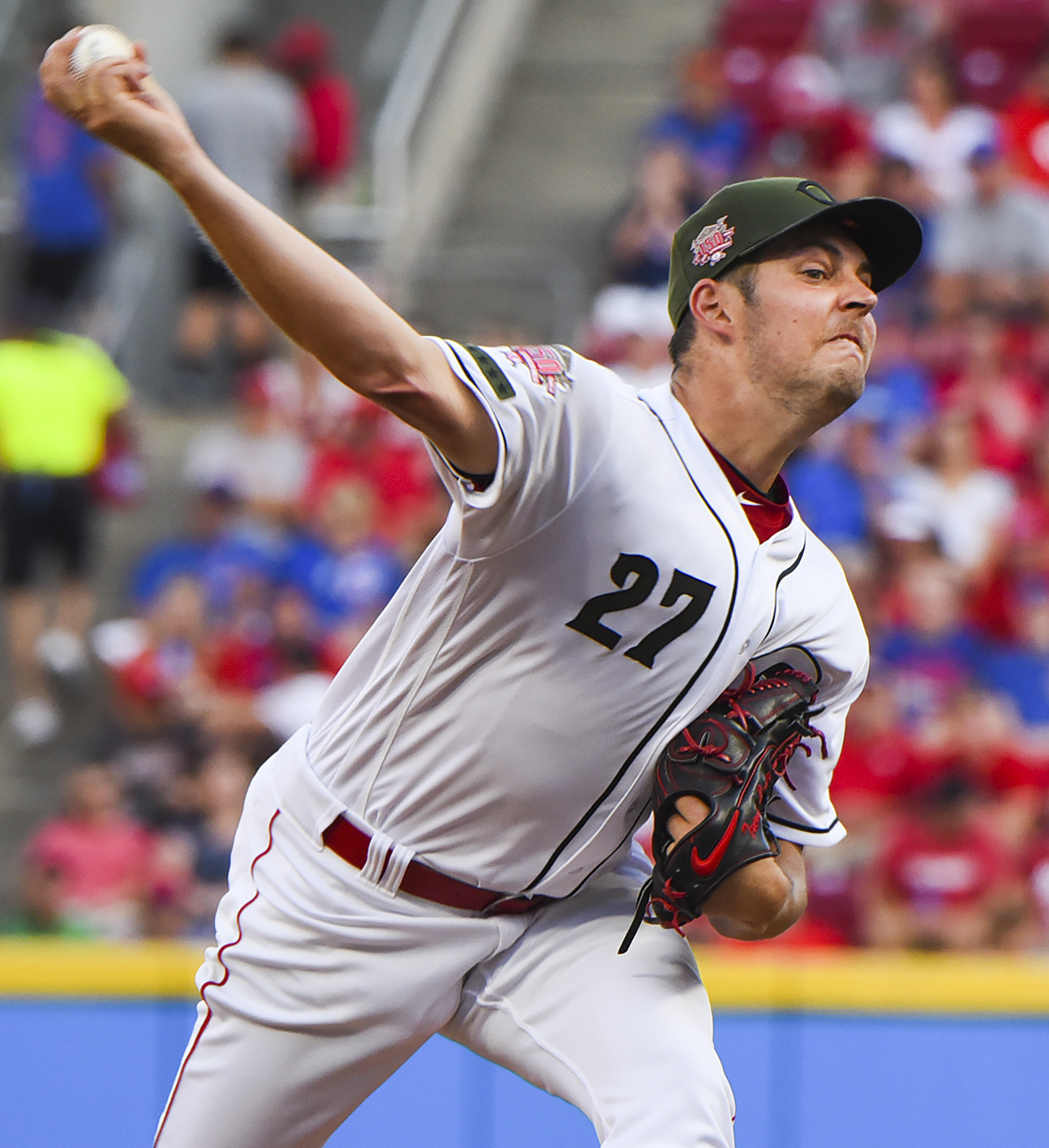
Bauer with the Cincinnati Reds in 2019

On July 31, 2019, the Cincinnati Reds acquired Bauer in a three-team trade with the Indians and the San Diego Padres. Cleveland acquired Yasiel Puig and Scott Moss from Cincinnati and Franmil Reyes, Logan Allen, and Victor Nova from San Diego, while the Reds sent prospect Taylor Trammell to the Padres. Bauer struggled in his team debut, lasting only 4 2/3 innings while allowing three runs on seven hits, walking three batters, and hitting another batter with a pitch. He followed a difficult first start with a dominant appearance over the Chicago Cubs, striking out 11 batters as Cincinnati won 5–2. Bauer remained an inconsistent force in the Reds' starting rotation: in his first 10 starts with the new team, he posted a 2–5 record with a 6.39 ERA and 12 home runs. In five of those first ten starts, he allowed five or more earned runs. Bauer was frustrated with his own performance, referring to the back half of the season as "one step forward, two steps back". He ultimately went 11–13 for the season in 34 starts between Cleveland and Cincinnati, posting a 4.48 ERA and striking out 253 batters in 213 innings.

Bauer avoided arbitration prior to the 2020 MLB season, agreeing to a one-year, $17.5 million contract with the Reds on January 10, 2020. As the season was indefinitely paused, first due to the COVID-19 pandemic and then as negotiations between the league and players' union reached a stalemate, Bauer became frustrated with the lack of play, saying that the suspension had done "irreparable damage" to the sport of baseball. Bauer ultimately put out a career-best year during the shortened 60-game season, posting a 5–4 record and leading the league with a 1.73 ERA in 11 starts while striking out 100 batters in 73 innings. As the regular season built to a close, Bauer began pitching on short rest, starting every fourth day rather than every fifth to help the Reds clinch a postseason berth. Bauer was selected to start the opening match of the Reds' 2020 National League Wild Card Series against the Atlanta Braves, pitching 7 2/3 scoreless innings in what was ultimately a 13-inning loss for the Reds. It was the first postseason game in MLB history to remain scoreless after 11 innings of play, while Bauer became the first pitcher to last seven or more innings with no runs, fewer than three hits, no walks, and 12 or more strikeouts. He also set a Cincinnati record for the most strikeouts delivered by a pitcher in the playoffs. Although Atlanta swept Cincinnati during the Wild Card series, Bauer bested Yu Darvish of the Cubs and Jacob deGrom of the New York Mets in voting for the NL Cy Young Award. He was the first pitcher for Cincinnati to receive the award; previously, the Reds were the only active MLB team founded prior to 1961 that had never boasted a winning pitcher. Bauer rejected the Reds' $18.9 million qualifying offer on November 4, 2020, making him a free agent, but he said he remained open to rejoining the team.

=== Los Angeles Dodgers (2021–2023) ===
After becoming a free agent, Bauer courted offers from a number of MLB teams, ultimately turning down a deal from the New York Mets to sign with the Los Angeles Dodgers on February 5, 2021. The Dodgers signed Bauer to a three-year, $102 million contract, with opt-out options after the 2021 and 2022 MLB seasons. Some concerns had been raised among the Mets over Bauer's social media use, including two incidents in which women accused Bauer of harassing them online. The Dodgers were aware of Bauer's abrasive reputation, but were willing to overlook it in favor of his pitching ability, with Mookie Betts telling the Los Angeles Times, "He is who he is. You know what you're getting and so I don't really worry about it. It doesn't bother me."

Bauer pitched for the Dodgers in 2021, amassing an 8-5 record and a 2.59 ERA in 17 starts. As of June 29, 2021, he led MLB with 107 2/3 innings pitched and 137 strikeouts.

==== Administrative suspension and release ====
On July 2, 2021, MLB placed Bauer on administrative leave while an internal investigation was opened into sexual assault allegations that had been made against him. On September 10, MLB and the players union agreed to extend Bauer's leave through the remainder of the 2021 season.

MLB's investigation into Bauer was suspended due to the 2021–22 MLB lockout, and he began the 2022 season on administrative leave as the investigation continued. In April 2022, Bauer was suspended for 324 games without pay. Following an appeal by Bauer, an arbitrator reduced Bauer's suspension to 194 games, reinstating him immediately while docking his pay for the first 50 games of 2023.

On January 6, 2023, the Dodgers designated Bauer for assignment. He was officially released on January 12.

=== Yokohama DeNA BayStars (2023) ===
On March 13, 2023, Bauer agreed to an incentive-laden one-year, $4 million contract with the Yokohama DeNA BayStars, a Central League team in Nippon Professional Baseball. The Dodgers paid the remainder of his $22.5 million salary for 2023. On May 3, he pitched his first baseball game since leaving the Dodgers, in a 4–1 win over the Hiroshima Toyo Carp. He was nominated for the NPB All-Star Game and named the June MVP. In 19 games for Yokohama, he registered a 10–4 record and 2.76 ERA with 130 strikeouts across 130 2/3 innings pitched. On November 30, Bauer elected free agency.

=== Diablos Rojos del México (2024) ===
On March 18, 2024, Bauer announced that he would start the season by pitching in six games for the Diablos Rojos del México of the Mexican League (LMB). On April 21, in his second start for the Diablos, Bauer pitched six innings, recording 14 strikeouts including an immaculate inning in the 4th, and struck out nine consecutive batters, equaling the league record. At midseason, Bauer led the league in ERA (1.50) and strikeouts (62) and was tied for the lead in wins (5). He was selected to the LMB All-Star Game and named the starting pitcher for the South Division. On May 25, Bauer agreed to a contract extension with the Diablos for the remainder of the 2024 season. On June 21, Bauer set the Mexican League single-game strikeout record with 19 strikeouts against the Guerreros de Oaxaca. In 14 starts, he recorded a 10–0 record and 2.48 ERA with a league–leading 120 strikeouts across 83 1/3 innings pitched. Additionally, his 10 wins were tied for the league lead alongside César Valdez and Juan Pablo Oramas. Bauer's milestones came despite multiple health issues that he battled during the regular season, which he detailed in videos posted to his YouTube channel. He was sidelined for nearly two weeks in mid-July due to gastrointestinal issues, which were later diagnosed as ulcerative colitis. After starting medications, Bauer developed partial paralysis and numbness in his lower extremities. He left the team in early August and returned to Arizona to seek medical treatment. It was later revealed he had been diagnosed with Guillain–Barré syndrome, which was caught early and subsequently treated with immunoglobulin therapy.

Bauer missed the first series of the LMB playoffs, but returned following successful treatment of GBS. During the playoffs, Bauer posted a 1.67 ERA and struck out 32 batters over 27 innings pitched, culminating in the Diablos winning the Serie del Rey. Following the season, Bauer was awarded as the 2024 Mexican League Pitcher of the Year.

=== Yokohama DeNA BayStars (2025) ===
On January 27, 2025, Bauer signed with the Yokohama DeNA BayStars of Nippon Professional Baseball, marking his second stint with the team. He made 21 appearances for Yokohama, posting a 4-10 record and 4.51 ERA with 119 strikeouts across 133 2/3 innings pitched. On December 2, Bauer and the BayStars parted ways.

=== Long Island Ducks (2026) ===
On April 2, 2026, Bauer announced that he had signed with the Long Island Ducks of the Atlantic League of Professional Baseball. On April 26, he threw a seven-inning no-hitter against the Lancaster Stormers. On May 12, Bauer set the franchise record with 15 strikeouts over eight innings while allowing two earned runs in a 6–3 victory over the Gastonia Ghost Peppers. On May 18, he was placed on the injured list due to back spasms. Two days later, while receiving treatment in Arizona, he was involved in a car crash where another driver T-boned his McLaren 765LT and totaled it; Bauer was not injured in the incident. He returned to the Ducks on June 21, and yielded one run, two hits, and struck out 10 in a win against the Lancaster Stormers.

=== Diablos Rojos del México (2026) ===
On June 22, 2026, Bauer's contract was purchased by the Diablos Rojos del México of the Mexican League, marking his second stint with the team.

=== Estrellas Orientales (2026) ===
As of November 2026, Bauer is pitching for the Estrellas Orientales of the Dominican Professional Baseball League.

== International career ==
After his freshman year at UCLA, Bauer played for the USA Baseball Collegiate National Team. That summer, he posted a 1–1 record with a 4.67 ERA in five games, three of which were starts, and striking out 24 batters in 17 1/3 innings.

In October 2024, Bauer appeared with the Switzerland national team in an exhibition against the Czech Republic. In 5.0 innings pitched, he allowed three runs, with two walks and three strikeouts. Switzerland went on to lose the game, 12–0.

== Pitching style ==
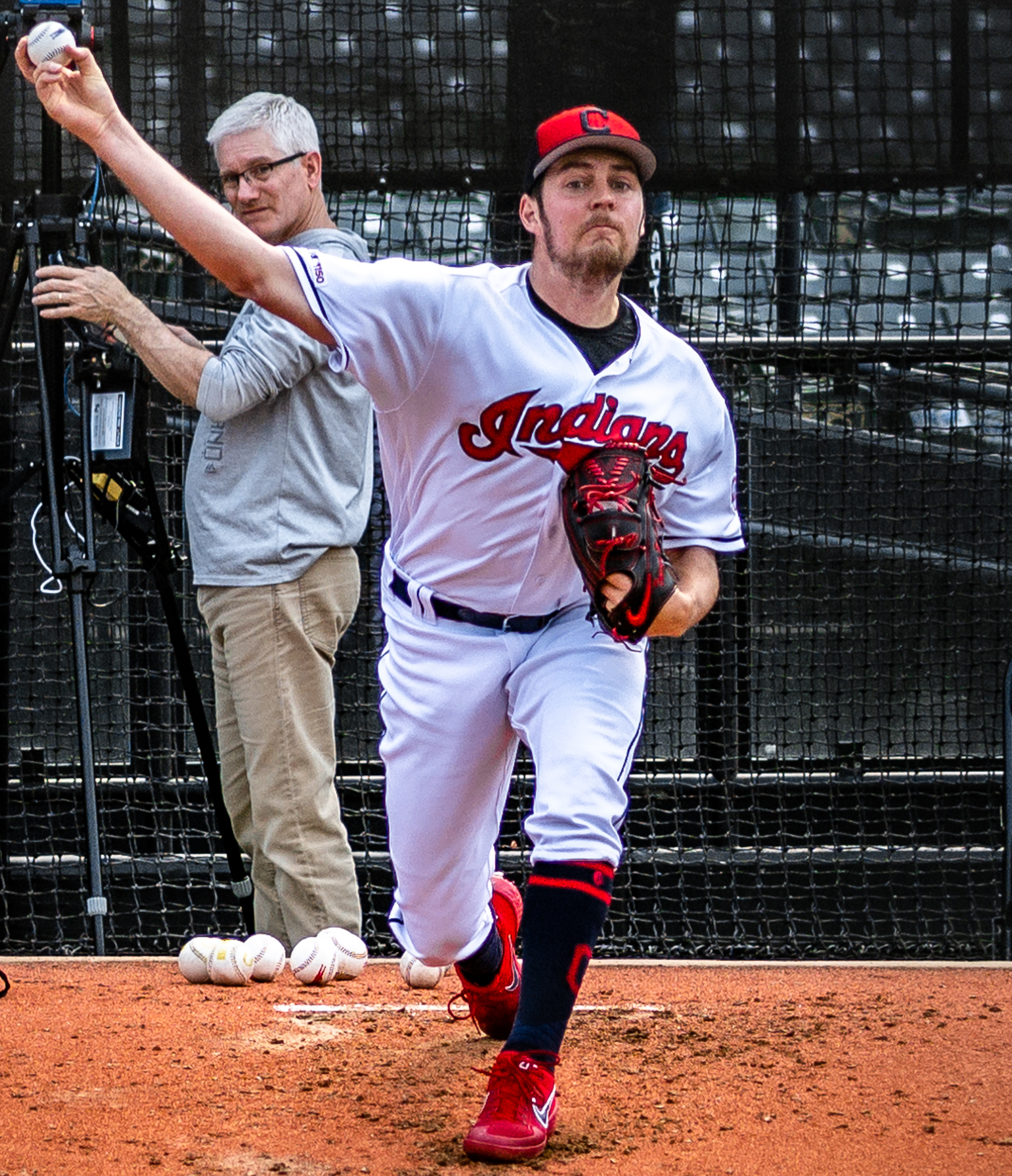
Bauer with the Indians in 2019

Bauer makes a point of having as vast a pitching repertoire as possible. As a prospect in 2012, he told reporters, "The more pitches that I have, that have different speeds and move differently, the more confusion it creates for the hitter." He estimates that he has thrown 19 different pitches, including ones that he himself invented: for instance, the "reverse slider", a variation on the screwball, and "the bird", a form of split finger fastball in which the middle finger is raised up, approximating the "bird" hand gesture. Broadly, he has been observed using a four-seam fastball (tops out at 99 mph), a two-seam fastball, a slider, a curveball, a split finger fastball, and a cut fastball. This expansive repertoire is designed to confuse batters, but also requires a difficult learning curve between Bauer and his catcher. In addition to his vast pitch repertoire, Bauer has garnered attention over his stamina on the mound: at the start of the 2021 season, his fastball velocity averaged 93.8 mph (151.0 km/h), with the fastest individual pitches coming towards the end of his starts. He attributes part of his late-inning success to his "tunneling approach" on the mound, which involves starting every pitch down the middle before having it break in a certain direction. The technique can confuse batters, because every pitch looks the same from the start, only to feint while crossing the plate.

Ever since his rookie season with Arizona, sports journalists have drawn attention to Bauer's unique warmup regimen, which includes a long toss warmup from between the two foul poles of a field, a distance averaging about 467 feet (142 m). He began incorporating long toss into his warmup regimen as a preteen attending Alan Jaeger's baseball clinic in southern California. In addition to this pregame regimen, Bauer has historically utilized a high-speed Edgertronic camera to record both himself and pitchers whose technique he wants to emulate. Watching the camera footage back allowed Bauer to tweak his slider and two-seam fastball and get the results he desired. Bauer's overhand delivery has earned comparisons to former San Francisco Giants pitcher Tim Lincecum. When Bauer was retooling his pitch technique in preparation for major league ball, he admitted to modeling his mechanics after Lincecum's delivery.

=== Sticky stuff controversy ===
Bauer has been one of several players at the heart of the 2021 sticky stuff controversy in MLB, which concerns the use of resin-infused grip enhancers to improve spin rate on pitches. In February 2020, Bauer helped publicize the story when he spoke with HBO's Real Sports with Bryant Gumbel about the use of pine tar and other foreign substances, estimating that "70 percent of the pitchers in the league use some sort of technically illegal substance on the ball." MLB began investigating the use of such substances during the 2021 season, and The Athletic reported at the start of April that some of Bauer's game balls had been removed for inspection after sources claimed that the balls were sticky to the touch, with visible markings. Speculation that Bauer had been using grip-enhancing substances increased after the spin rate on his fastball dropped by more than 200 rpm following an announcement from MLB that the league would begin enforcing their rules on foreign substances. Despite this speculation, no conclusive evidence has determined that Bauer had used grip-enhancing substances.

== Personal life ==
=== Assault allegations ===
On June 30, 2021, the Pasadena Police Department confirmed to news outlets that Bauer was under investigation for the alleged assault of a San Diego woman that May. The woman was granted a temporary domestic violence restraining order on June 28, alleging that she had met Bauer on April 21 and that she had been physically and sexually assaulted by him on two separate occasions. The woman alleged that Bauer had sodomized her without consent, punched her in the face, and choked her to the point of unconsciousness. On May 16, she went to the emergency room at Alvarado Hospital, where, after her injuries were examined, she met with several detectives from the San Diego Police Department. MLB placed Bauer on administrative leave on July 2, while the Dodgers removed his merchandise from their team store and replaced his scheduled bobblehead promotional night with a Clayton Kershaw "World Champion T-shirt" promotion. Bauer has acknowledged having sexual contact with his accuser, but has stated that their encounters were "'wholly consensual'" and that his accuser sent him a text message requesting that he inflict pain upon her; he has denied certain specific aspects of the allegations. Bauer underwent a civil hearing for the restraining order against him from August 16 to August 19. Bauer did not testify during the hearing.

On August 20, the temporary restraining order against Bauer was removed after a judge determined that Bauer did not pose a threat to the woman's immediate safety. Judge Diana Gould-Saltman found that the woman "was not ambiguous about wanting rough sex in the parties' first encounter, and wanting rougher sex in the second encounter" and that Bauer had honored the woman's boundaries when she set them.

Bauer remained under investigation by MLB and police through the 2021 season but the Los Angeles County District Attorney's Office elected not to file criminal charges, citing a lack of evidence. On April 29, 2022, MLB announced that Bauer would be suspended for 324 games (equivalent to two seasons) without pay for violating the league's Joint Domestic Violence, Sexual Assault and Child Abuse Policy. Bauer's suspension was the longest non-lifetime suspension issued in MLB history. Bauer appealed the suspension, becoming the first player ever to appeal a suspension under the league's domestic violence policy since it went into effect in 2015. On December 22, 2022, an arbitrator reduced Bauer's suspension to 194 games. Bauer was reinstated immediately, but his pay was docked for the first 50 games of the 2023 season.

Bauer sued his accuser for defamation, and she filed a counterclaim alleging sexual battery. Both suits were settled in 2023 with neither party admitting any wrongdoing and no money changing hands. Bauer released a video that October saying that he was "happy to be moving on with [his] life". He filed a new lawsuit against his accuser citing breach of settlement in October 2024. On June 2, 2025, Bauer was awarded just over $300,000 from his accuser in a default judgement. Bauer has never been charged with a crime and has never paid anyone in settlement as of 2026.

While Bauer was under investigation in 2021, The Washington Post uncovered court records showing that a woman from Ohio had sought a temporary order of protection against Bauer in June 2020. This woman alleged that Bauer had physically abused her and had made threats against her. A third woman accused Bauer of sexual assault in 2022 and 2023. Bauer denied all of these allegations. In March 2022, Bauer filed defamation lawsuits against Deadspin, The Athletic, Deadspin editor Chris Baud, and former Athletic reporter Molly Knight. A federal judge in New York dismissed the suits against Deadspin and Baud in March 2023, and Bauer dropped his case against The Athletic three months later after the outlet agreed to post a clarification story.

A fourth woman claimed Bauer had sexually assaulted and impregnated her. In March 2024, that woman was criminally charged with defrauding Bauer. Bauer reportedly paid her $10,000 for "medical expenses, prenatal vitamins, and car services" related to a pregnancy; he has alleged that the pregnancy never occurred. Prior to March 2024, the woman and Bauer had sued one another in civil court.

=== Business ventures ===
Besides pitching, Bauer is interested in marketing the sport of baseball, particularly in response to what he perceives as negativity from sports commentators during games. In 2019, he started a video production company called Momentum Films, with the intention of showcasing the stories of professional baseball players, as well as their off-field personalities. Momentum is also a YouTube group by Bauer featuring content creators such as former San Francisco Giants minor leaguer Eric Sim, Kevin Chan, Cole Acheronti, Tosh Semlacher, and himself in videos, alongside his agent Rachel Luba behind the scenes. In addition to Momentum, which has a content partnership with FOX Sports, Bauer records YouTube video blogs about baseball and runs a podcast called Bauer Bytes.

=== Charitable campaigns ===
After receiving a higher salary than expected during an arbitration hearing in 2018, Bauer launched a charity campaign called "69 Days of Giving", where he promised to donate an exact amount of US$420.69 to 68 charities selected by his fans. The final charity, decided by Bauer, would receive a donation of US$69,420.69. The campaign ended on June 5, 2018, with Max S. Hayes High School in Cleveland, Ohio, receiving the final donation. Bauer chose his donation amounts based on the connotations around the numbers 420, typically associated with cannabis culture, and 69, an oral sex position. He believed that employing a campaign around sex and drug references would help market the charitable contributions.

=== Political beliefs and social media ===
Bauer is an active Twitter user who has made many of his political beliefs known via the platform. He identifies as a free market capitalist and social liberal. Although he did not vote in the 2016 United States presidential election, Bauer has expressed his personal support of Donald Trump, who he believed "would shake up the system." He previously expressed his support for 2012 presidential candidate Mitt Romney and criticized former president Barack Obama. In February 2017, Bauer accused Apple and Twitter of exhibiting a liberal media bias, after which he proceeded to express a variety of political beliefs, including climate change denial, skepticism that Obama was born in the United States, and a defense of the Indians' mascot Chief Wahoo, which has been criticized as a racial caricature. In 2018, Bauer accused the Indians of restricting his Twitter access in order to censor his political commentary. In 2024, he faced backlash in Japan after posting a supportive message for Ridge Alkonis, an American naval officer convicted for negligent deaths of two people in Shizuoka Prefecture, Japan.

Bauer, who has been called "extremely online" by NBC Sports correspondent Bill Baer, has also been accused of engaging in online harassment of those who disagree with his views. In January 2019, Bauer responded to a female college student who referred to him as her "least favorite person in all of sports" by tweeting at her over the course of 12 hours and encouraging his followers to harass her as well.
