= Logan Allen (baseball, born 1997) =

American baseball player (born 1997)

KT Wiz – No. 43
- Pitcher
- Born: May 23, 1997 (age 29); West Palm Beach, Florida, U.S.
- Bats: Right Throws: Left

Professional debut
- MLB: June 18, 2019, for the San Diego Padres
- KBO: March 22, 2025, for the NC Dinos

MLB statistics (through 2024 season)
- Win–loss record: 5–11
- Earned run average: 5.79
- Strikeouts: 89

KBO statistics (through 2026 season)
- Win–loss record: 14–17
- Earned run average: 4.20
- Strikeouts: 232
- Stats at Baseball Reference

Teams
- San Diego Padres (2019); Cleveland Indians / Guardians (2019–2022); Baltimore Orioles (2022); Arizona Diamondbacks (2024); NC Dinos (2025); KT Wiz (2026–present)

Logan Shane Allen (born May 23, 1997) is an American professional baseball pitcher for the KT Wiz of the KBO League. He has previously played in Major League Baseball (MLB) for the San Diego Padres, Cleveland Indians/Guardians, Baltimore Orioles, and Arizona Diamondbacks, and in the KBO for the NC Dinos. Allen was drafted by the Boston Red Sox out of IMG Academy in the 8th round of the 2015 MLB draft.

== Early life ==
Allen was born in West Palm Beach, Florida, and raised in Fletcher, North Carolina. He is the second of three sons. He studied at T. C. Roberson High School in Asheville, North Carolina and then IMG Academy in Bradenton, Florida.

== Career ==
=== Boston Red Sox ===
Allen was drafted by the Boston Red Sox in the eighth round of the 2015 Major League Baseball draft out of IMG Academy. He signed with the Red Sox and spent the majority of his first professional season with the Gulf Coast Red Sox, pitching to a 0.90 ERA in twenty innings, along with pitching one game for the Lowell Spinners in which he gave up one earned run in 4 1/3 innings.

=== San Diego Padres ===
On November 13, 2015, Allen, along with Manuel Margot, Javier Guerra and Carlos Asuaje, were traded to the San Diego Padres for Craig Kimbrel. The Padres assigned him to the Fort Wayne TinCaps, where he spent the whole season, posting a 3–4 record and 3.33 ERA in only 15 games (11 starts) due to spending time on the disabled list with an injury. He spent 2017 with both Fort Wayne and the Lake Elsinore Storm, pitching to a combined 7–9 record and 2.95 ERA with 142 strikeouts in 125 total innings pitched (24 games, with 23 being starts) between both teams, and 2018 with the San Antonio Missions and the El Paso Chihuahuas, going 14–6 with a 2.54 ERA in 25 games (24 starts) and was named Texas League Pitcher of the Year. He returned to El Paso to begin 2019.

Allen was called up and made his major league debut at Petco Park on June 18, 2019. He pitched seven shutout innings for the win against the Milwaukee Brewers, with five strikeouts and two walks, and also had his first major league hit, later scoring on an error. He was 2–3 in 8 games (4 starts) for the Padres.

=== Cleveland Indians / Guardians ===
On July 31, 2019, the Padres traded Allen to the Cleveland Indians in a three-team trade, where the Reds acquired Trevor Bauer, the Indians also acquired Yasiel Puig, Scott Moss, Franmil Reyes, and Victor Nova, and the Padres acquired Taylor Trammell.

In 2020, Allen appeared in 3 games, compiling a 0–0 record with 3.38 ERA and 7 strikeouts in 10.2 innings pitched.

In 2021, Allen beat out fellow pitcher Cal Quantrill for a starting pitcher position on the Indians' Opening Day roster after allowing only 1 run across 14 Spring Training innings. However, Allen struggled with command over the regular season and was optioned to Triple-A affiliate Columbus Clippers for the majority of May through August. He finished the season pitching to a 2–7 record with a 6.26 ERA over 50.1 innings pitched.

Allen was designated for assignment by the Guardians on May 1, 2022.

=== Baltimore Orioles ===
On May 5, 2022, Allen was claimed off waivers by the Baltimore Orioles. In 3 appearances for Baltimore, Allen allowed 2 runs on 3 hits and 2 walks with a strikeout in 1 2/3 innings pitched. On May 17, Allen was designated for assignment following the promotion of Nick Vespi. On May 20, he cleared waivers and was sent outright to the Triple–A Norfolk Tides. In 21 contests for Norfolk, Allen struggled to an 8.51 ERA with 21 strikeouts in 24 1/3 innings of work. He was released by the Orioles organization on August 22.

=== Colorado Rockies ===
On August 26, 2022, Allen signed a minor league deal with the Colorado Rockies. He made 6 starts for the Triple–A Albuquerque Isotopes down the stretch, posting a 1–3 record and 6.43 ERA with 25 strikeouts in 28.0 innings of work.

Allen worked out of the bullpen for Albuquerque in 2023, making 24 relief appearances but struggling to a 7.20 ERA with 50 strikeouts in 45.0 innings pitched. He was released by the Rockies organization on July 1, 2023.

=== Seattle Mariners ===
On July 14, 2023, Allen signed a minor league contract with the Seattle Mariners organization. In 14 games (10 starts) for the Triple–A Tacoma Rainiers, he recorded a 4.66 ERA with 49 strikeouts across 58 innings pitched. Allen elected free agency following the season on November 6.

=== Arizona Diamondbacks ===
On January 2, 2024, Allen signed a minor league contract with the Arizona Diamondbacks. He was assigned to the Triple–A Reno Aces to begin the year. On April 17, The Diamondbacks selected Allen's contract to the major league roster. On April 18, Allen made his Diamondbacks debut, allowing three hits and one earned run with three strikeouts in 4 2/3 innings in a loss against the San Francisco Giants. In 12 games for the Diamondbacks, he logged a 5.46 ERA with 21 strikeouts across 28 innings pitched. On June 9, Allen was designated for assignment by Arizona. He cleared waivers and was sent outright to Reno on June 12. Allen elected free agency the following day. On June 16, Allen re–signed with the Diamondbacks organization on a minor league contract. He elected free agency following the season on November 4.

=== NC Dinos ===
On December 13, 2024, Allen signed with the NC Dinos of the KBO League. Allen made 32 appearances (31 starts) for the Dinos in 2025, posting a 7–12 record and 4.53 ERA with 149 strikeouts across 173 innings of work. He became a free agent following the season.

=== Los Angeles Dodgers ===
On February 24, 2026, Allen signed with the Toros de Tijuana of the Mexican League. However, on March 19, he opted out of that deal and signed a minor league contract with the Los Angeles Dodgers, who assigned him to the Triple-A Oklahoma City Comets. Allen made 12 appearances (11 of them starts) for Oklahoma City, posting a 2–4 record and 6.08 ERA with 36 strikeouts across 53 1/3 innings pitched. Allen was released by the Dodgers organization on June 11, in order to pursue another opportunity in Korea.

=== KT Wiz ===
On June 12, 2026, Allen signed a six-week contract with the KT Wiz of the KBO League as an injury replacement for Caleb Boushley.

== International career ==
Allen was named to the Canada national team for the 2026 World Baseball Classic. Born in the United States, he is eligible to play for Canada because his father was born in Montreal, Quebec. The 2026 tournament marked Allen's debut with Canada. He pitched twice, allowing one run in 3 1/3 innings pitched.
