= Franmil Reyes =

Dominican baseball player (born 1995)

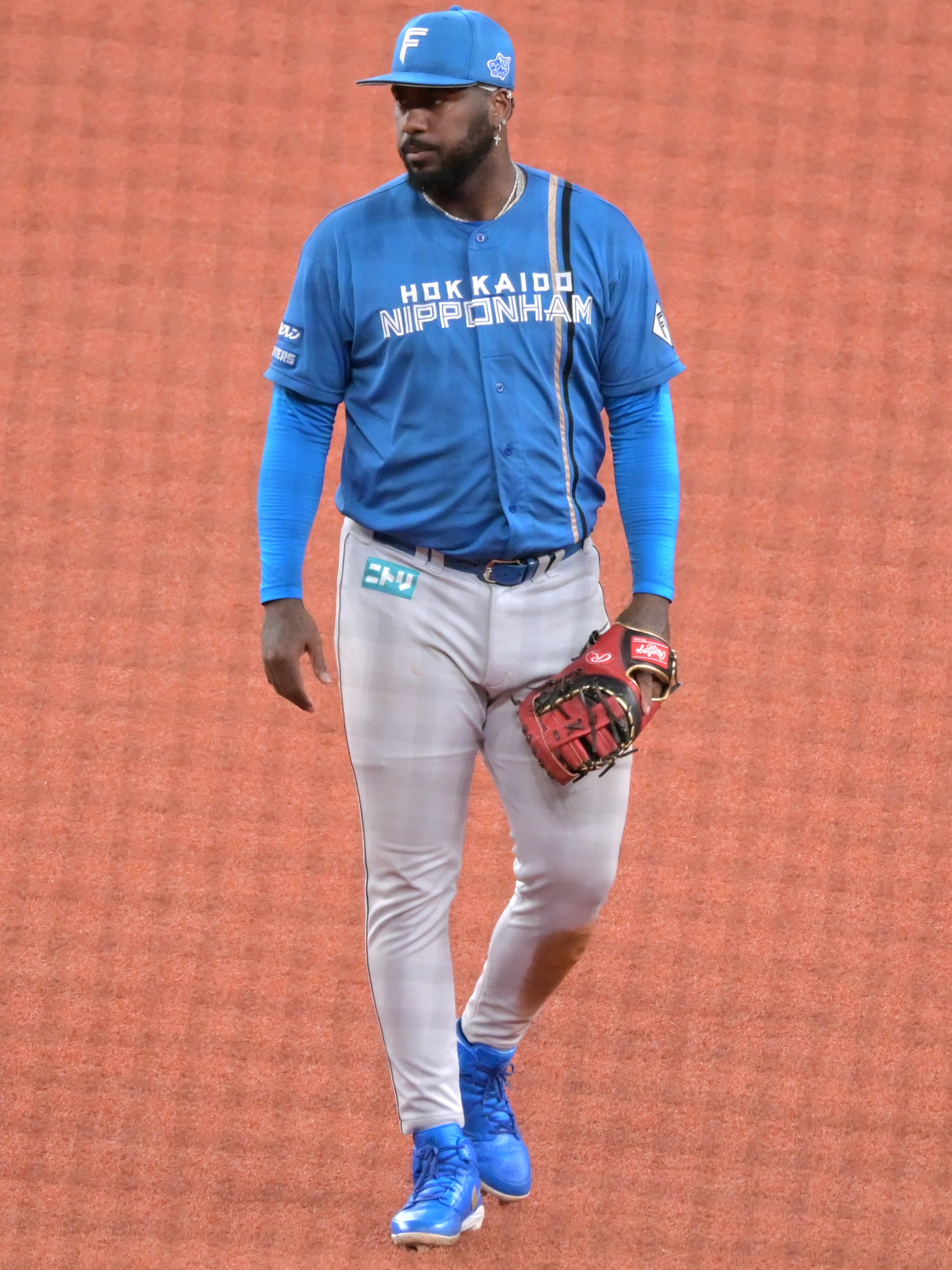
- Reyes with the Hokkaido Nippon-Ham Fighters in 2024

Hokkaido Nippon-Ham Fighters – No. 99
- Outfielder / Designated hitter
- Born: July 7, 1995 (age 31); Palenque, Dominican Republic
- Bats: Right Throws: Right

Professional debut
- MLB: May 14, 2018, for the San Diego Padres
- NPB: March 29, 2024, for the Hokkaido Nippon-Ham Fighters

MLB statistics (through 2023 season)
- Batting average: .249
- Home runs: 108
- Runs batted in: 285

NPB statistics (through August 18, 2026)
- Batting average: .294
- Home runs: 83
- Runs batted in: 219
- Stats at Baseball Reference

Teams
- San Diego Padres (2018–2019); Cleveland Indians / Guardians (2019–2022); Chicago Cubs (2022); Kansas City Royals (2023); Hokkaido Nippon-Ham Fighters (2024–present)

Career highlights and awards
- Pacific League Best Nine Award (2024); NPB All-Star (2025)

Franmil Federico Reyes (born July 7, 1995) is a Dominican professional baseball outfielder and designated hitter for the Hokkaido Nippon-Ham Fighters of Nippon Professional Baseball (NPB). He has previously played in Major League Baseball (MLB) for the San Diego Padres, Cleveland Indians / Guardians, Chicago Cubs, and Kansas City Royals.

== Professional career ==
=== San Diego Padres (2011–2019) ===
==== Minor leagues (2011–2018) ====
Reyes signed with the San Diego Padres as an international free agent in 2011. He made his professional debut in 2012 with the Dominican Summer League Padres and spent the whole season there, batting .267/.360/.416 with four home runs and 37 RBIs in 67 games. He played 2013 with the Arizona League Padres and Eugene Emeralds where he compiled a .292 batting average with four home runs and 34 RBIs in 57 games, 2014 with the Fort Wayne TinCaps where he posted a .248 batting average with 11 home runs and 59 RBIs in 128 games, and 2015 back with Fort Wayne where he slashed .255/.320/.393 with eight home runs and 62 RBIs in 123 games.

Reyes played 2016 with the Lake Elsinore Storm where he batted .278 with 16 home runs and 83 RBIs in 130 games, and 2017 with the San Antonio Missions where he compiled a .258 batting average with 25 home runs, 102 RBIs, and a .785 on-base plus slugging (OPS) in 135 games. He started 2018 with the El Paso Chihuahuas. After batting .346/.442/.738 with 14 home runs and 38 RBIs in 36 games for El Paso, he was promoted to the San Diego Padres on May 14.

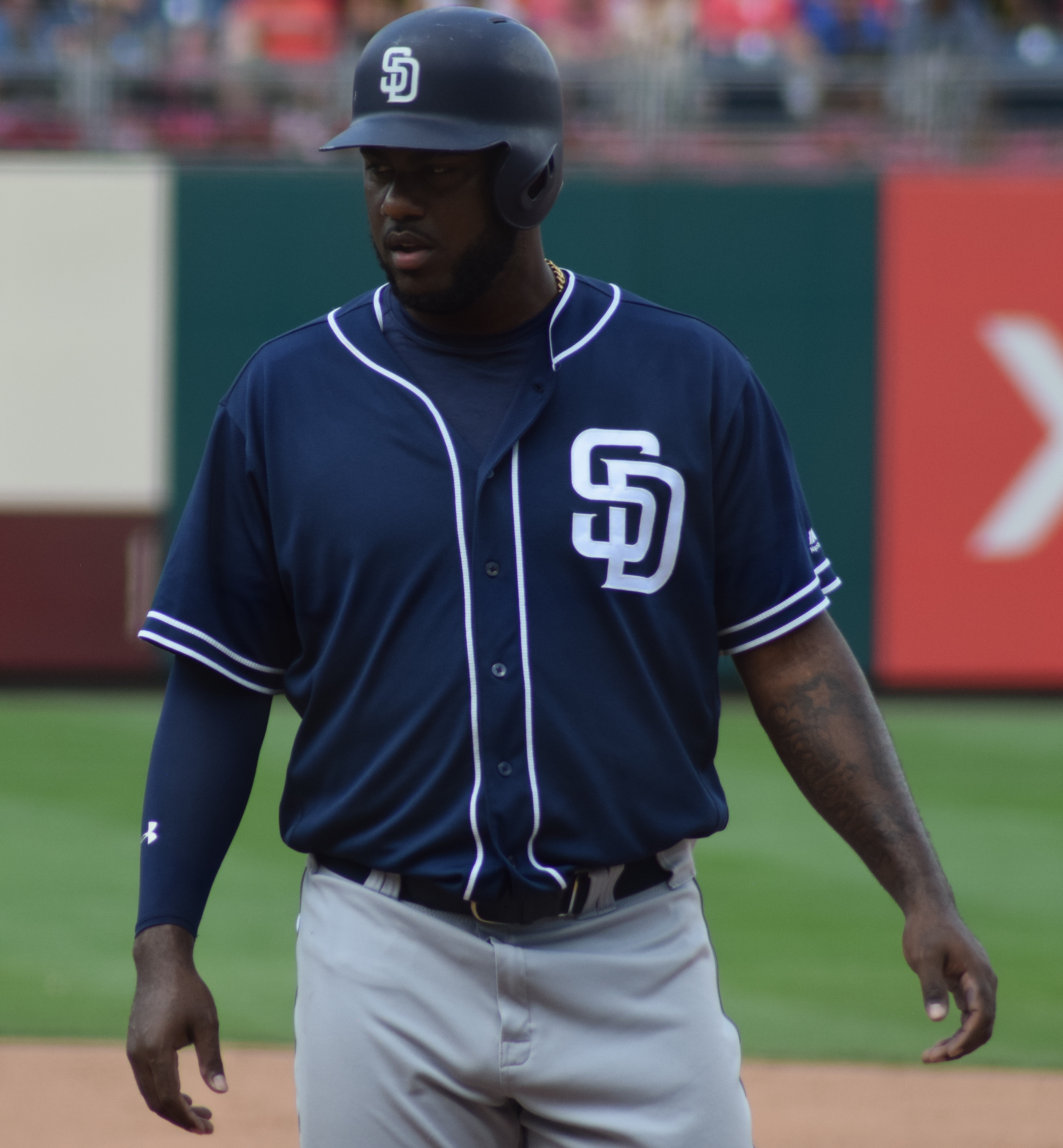
Reyes with the Padres in 2018

==== Major leagues (2018–2019) ====
Reyes made his Major League debut on May 14, 2018, against the Colorado Rockies, getting the start in right field after outfielders Wil Myers and Hunter Renfroe had both been placed on the injured list. Reyes hit his first MLB home run on May 21 at Nationals Park Reyes was optioned back to Triple-A El Paso on May 31 when Myers returned to the Padres. He returned to the team on July 10 and made regular starts in right field until he was optioned again on July 21 when Myers returned from a different injury. Reyes was recalled for a span of 10 games in July, but only saw 12 at-bats, serving mostly as a pinch hitter. He returned to the team in early August when Myers again went to the disabled list. After this fourth promotion, Reyes improved his approach at the plate and raised his average from .221 to .280 through the end of the season while making regular starts in right field. On August 30, he hit a walk-off home run in the 13th inning against Colorado. Reyes finished the season with an .838 OPS and 16 home runs in 261 at-bats and 71 starts in right field.

Reyes had surgery in the off-season to repair a torn right knee meniscus.

=== Cleveland Indians / Guardians (2019–2022) ===
On July 31, 2019, the Padres traded Reyes to the Cleveland Indians in a three-team trade that also included the Cincinnati Reds. The Indians also acquired Logan Allen and minor leaguer Victor Nova from the Padres and Yasiel Puig and minor league pitcher Scott Moss from the Reds, while the Reds acquired Trevor Bauer from the Indians and the Padres acquired minor leaguer Taylor Trammell from the Reds.

In 2019 in aggregate Reyes batted .249/.310/.512. He made contact with the lowest percentage of pitches he swung at (65.4%) of all major league batters. Overall with the 2020 Cleveland Indians, Reyes batted .275 with nine home runs and 34 RBIs in 59 games.

In 2021, Reyes batted .254 with 30 home runs, and 85 RBIs across 115 games. Reyes missed late May, and the entire month of June, due to an oblique strain.

The Guardians designated Reyes for assignment on August 6, 2022.

=== Chicago Cubs (2022) ===
On August 8, 2022, Reyes was claimed off waivers by the Chicago Cubs. On August 23, Reyes made an appearance as a pitcher against the St. Louis Cardinals, and recorded his first career pitching strikeout against Paul DeJong. Reyes appeared in 48 games for the Cubs down the stretch, slashing .234/.301/.389 with 5 home runs and 19 RBI. On November 10, Reyes was removed from the 40-man roster and sent outright to the Triple–A Iowa Cubs; he elected free agency the same day.

=== Kansas City Royals (2023) ===
On February 15, 2023, Reyes signed a minor league contract with the Kansas City Royals organization. On March 30, his contract was selected after making the Opening Day roster. He hit .186/.231/.288 with 2 home runs and 7 RBI in 19 games for Kansas City before he was optioned to the Triple-A Omaha Storm Chasers. On May 8, Reyes was designated for assignment following the acquisition of James McArthur. He elected free agency on May 11.

=== Washington Nationals (2023) ===
On May 18, 2023, Reyes signed a minor league contract with the Washington Nationals organization. In 34 games for the Triple–A Rochester Red Wings, he hit .219/.322/.383 with 5 home runs and 19 RBI. After spending time on the injured list with an undisclosed injury, Reyes was activated on August 11 and released by the Nationals.

=== Hokkaido Nippon-Ham Fighters (2024–present) ===
On January 8, 2024, Reyes signed a one-year contract with the Hokkaido Nippon-Ham Fighters of Nippon Professional Baseball. On August 31, Reyes set a new club record for the longest hitting streak by a foreign player, passing Fernando Seguignol's previous record of 21.

On October 23, 2024, Reyes re-signed with the Fighters to a one-year contract. Reyes made 132 appearances for the team in 2025, hitting .277/.347/.515 with 32 home runs and 90 RBI.

On October 21, 2025, Reyes again re-signed with the Fighters on a one-year contract. In 128 appearances, Reyes hit .313/.571/.375 with 32 home runs and 82 RBI, winning the Pacific League Batting Title.

On November 2, 2026, Reyes signed a four year contract extension to stay with the Fighters until 2030, with the contract being reportedly being worth up to 6.5 billion yen (or $40,000,000), making it one of the largest contracts in NPB history.
