= 2016 World Series =

112th edition of Major League Baseball's championship series

Team (Wins)	Managers	Season
Chicago Cubs (4)	Joe Maddon	103–58, .640, GA: 17 1/2
Cleveland Indians (3)	Terry Francona	94–67, .584, GA: 8
- Dates: October 25 – November 2
- Venue(s): Progressive Field (Cleveland); Wrigley Field (Chicago)
- MVP: Ben Zobrist (Chicago)
- Umpires: Chris Guccione, John Hirschbeck (crew chief), Sam Holbrook (Games 3–7), Marvin Hudson, Tony Randazzo, Larry Vanover (Games 1–2) and Joe West.

Broadcast
- Television: Fox (English); Fox Deportes (Spanish); MLB International (English)
- TV announcers: Joe Buck, John Smoltz, Ken Rosenthal and Tom Verducci (English); Carlos Álvarez, Duaner Sánchez, Karim García and Jaime Motta (Spanish); Matt Vasgersian and Buck Martinez (English)
- Radio: ESPN (English); ESPN Deportes (Spanish); WTAM (CLE); WSCR (CHC)
- Radio announcers: Dan Shulman and Aaron Boone (ESPN); Eduardo Ortega, José Francisco Rivera, Renato Bermúdez and Orlando Hernández (ESPN Deportes); Tom Hamilton and Jim Rosenhaus (WTAM); Pat Hughes, Len Kasper, Ron Coomer, and Jim Deshaies (WSCR)
- ALCS: Cleveland Indians over Toronto Blue Jays (4–1)
- NLCS: Chicago Cubs over Los Angeles Dodgers (4–2)

The 2016 World Series was the championship series of Major League Baseball's (MLB) 2016 season. The 112th edition of the World Series, it was a best-of-seven playoff between the National League (NL) champion Chicago Cubs and the American League (AL) champion Cleveland Indians, the first meeting of those franchises in postseason history. The Cubs defeated the Indians in seven games to win their first World Series championship since 1908, and their first while playing at Wrigley Field.

The series was played between October 25 and November 2, with Game 7 ended slightly after midnight local time on November 3. The Indians had home-field advantage because the AL had won the 2016 All-Star Game. This was the final World Series to have home-field advantage determined by the All-Star Game results; since 2017, home-field advantage has been awarded to the team with the better record. The deciding seventh game, won by Chicago 8–7 in ten innings, was the fifth World Series Game 7 to go into extra innings, and the first since 1997 (which, coincidentally, the Indians also lost). It was also the first Game 7 to have a rain delay, which occurred as the 10th inning was about to start. The Cubs became the sixth team to come back from a 3–1 deficit to win a best-of-seven World Series.

The Cubs, playing in their 11th World Series overall and their first since 1945, won their third championship and first since 1908, ending the longest championship drought in North American professional sports history. It was the Indians' sixth appearance in the World Series and their first since 1997, with their last Series win having come in 1948. Cleveland manager Terry Francona, who had previously won World Series titles with the Boston Red Sox in 2004 and 2007, fell short in his bid to become the third manager to win his first three trips to the Fall Classic, after Casey Stengel and Joe Torre.

The 2016 World Series was highly anticipated; the two teams entered their matchup as the two franchises with the longest World Series title droughts, a combined 176 seasons without a championship. At the series' conclusion, numerous outlets listed Game 7 as an instant classic, and the entire Series as one of the greatest of all time.

As of 2026, this is the most recent championship in the four major American sports leagues won by a Chicago-based team.

== Background ==
=== Chicago Cubs ===
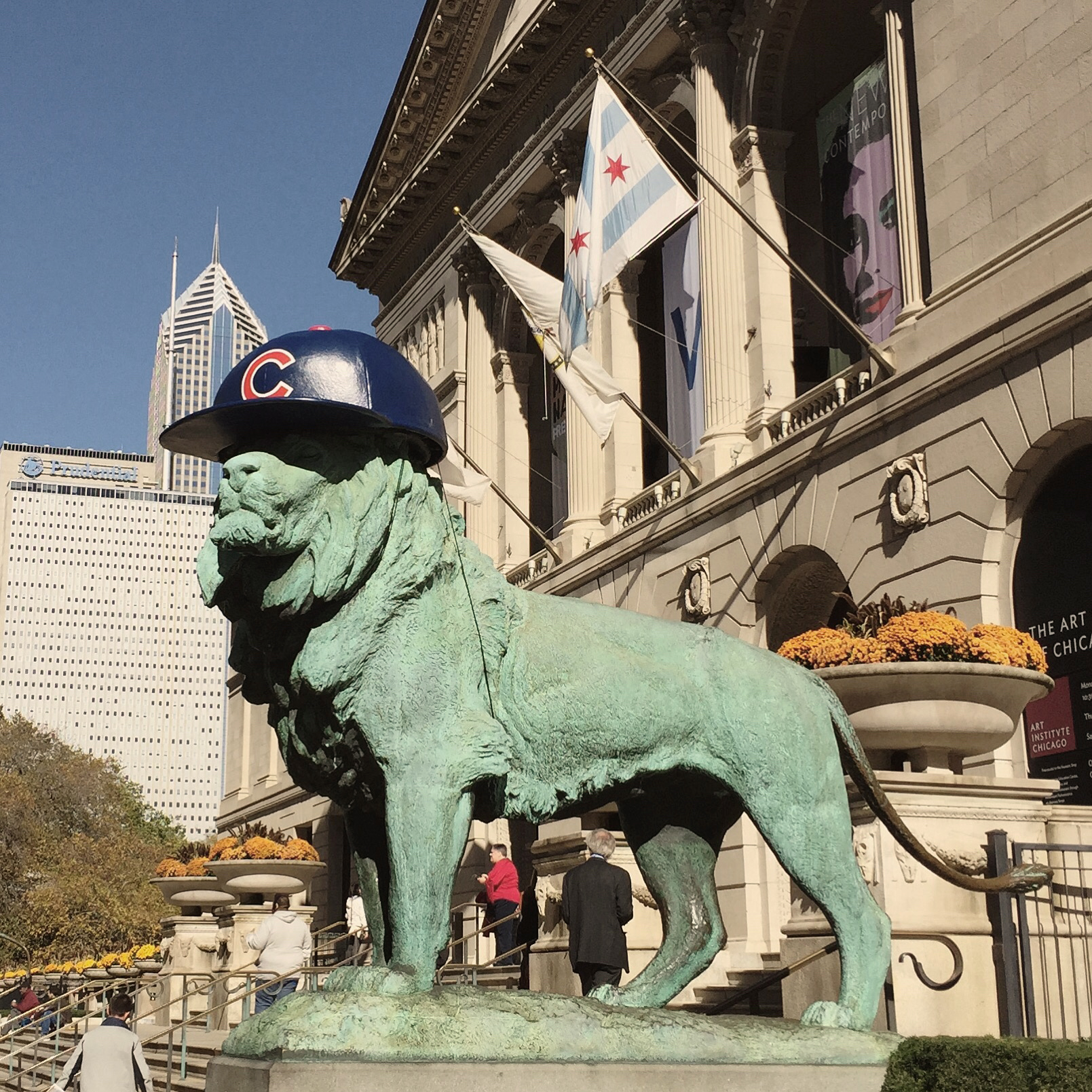
One of the two lion sculptures outside of the Art Institute of Chicago decorated in support of the Cubs

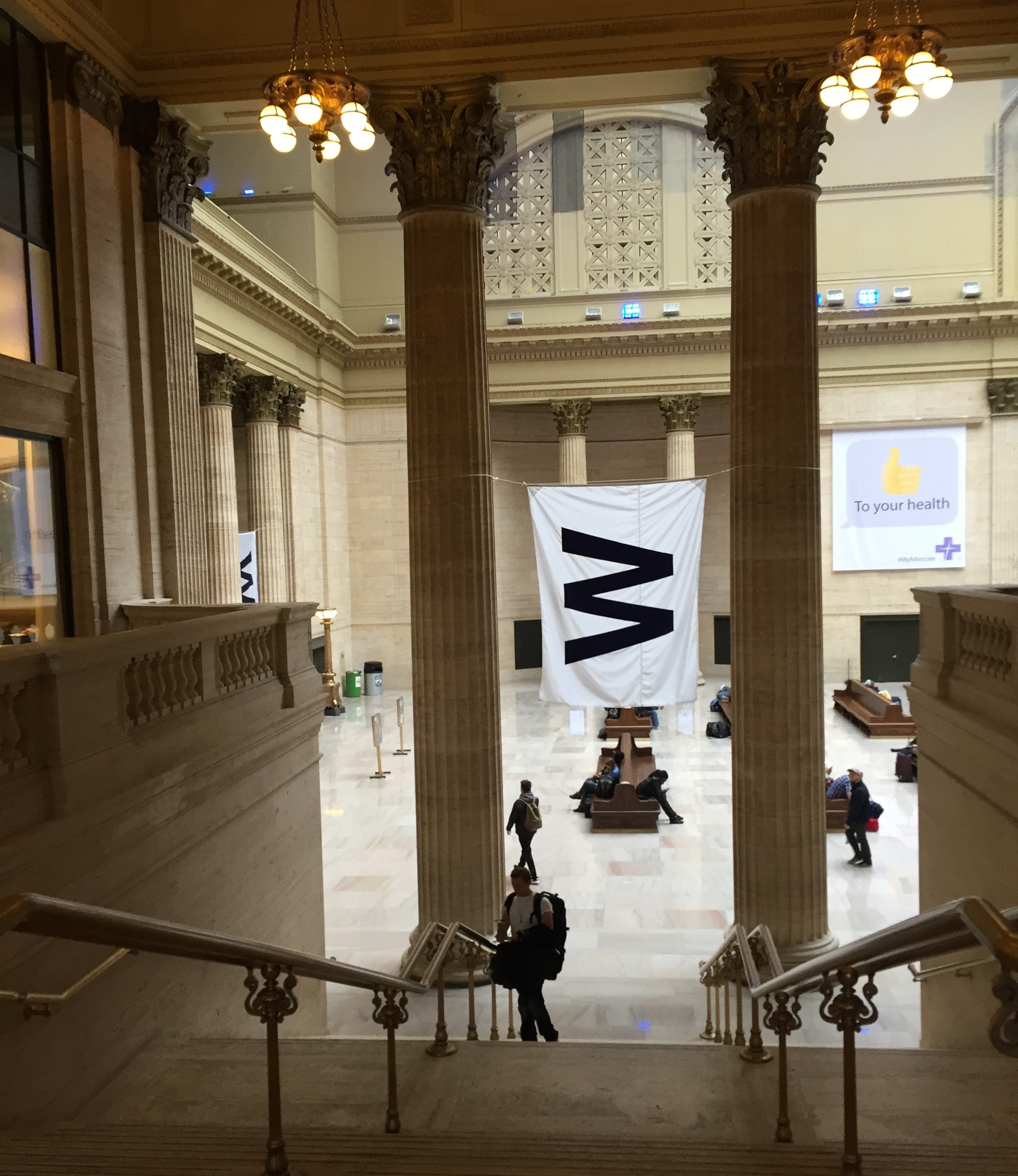
Large Cubs Win Flag in the Great Hall of the Chicago Union Station during the World Series

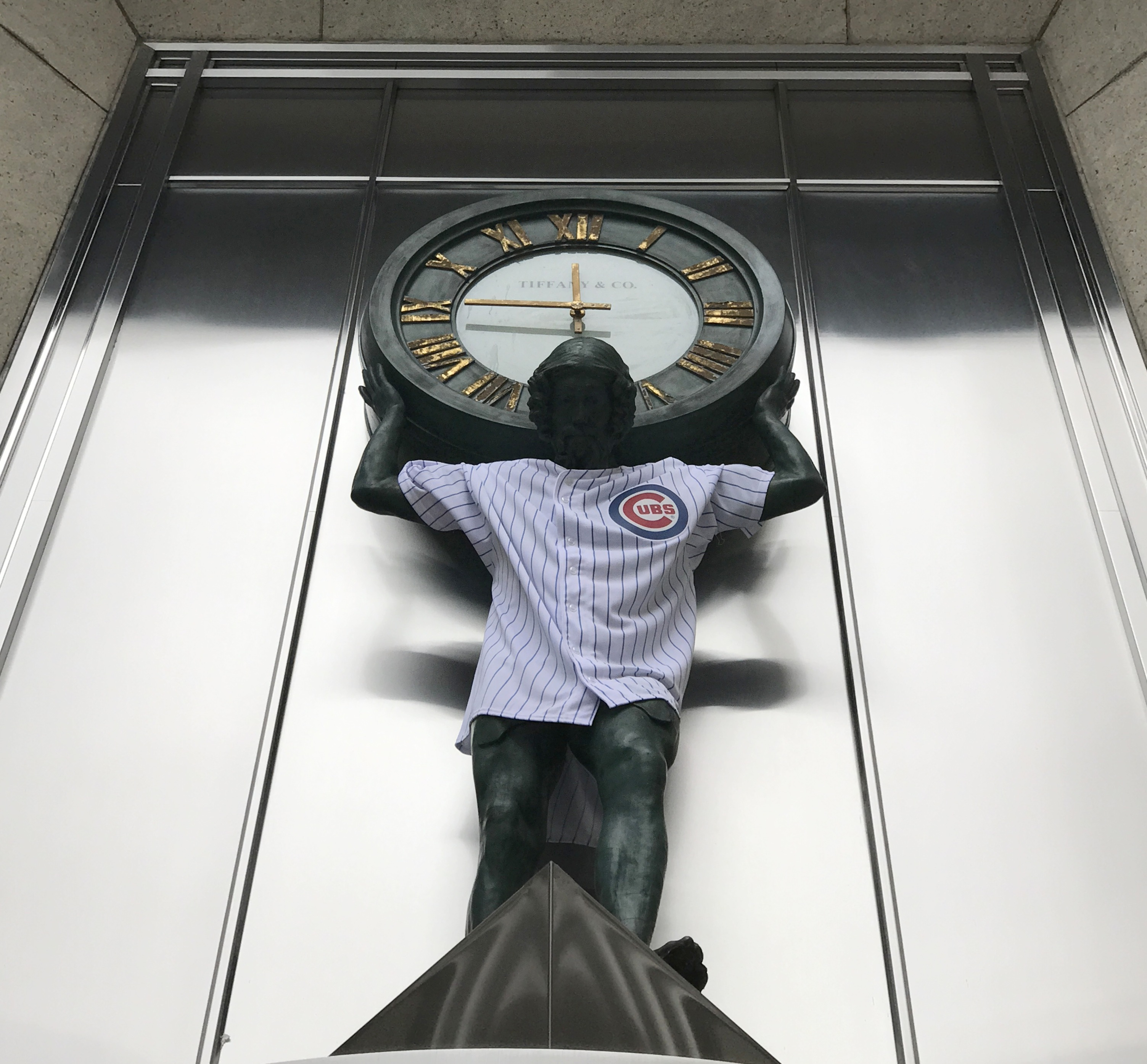
The clock outside of the Tiffany & Co. store on Chicago’s Magnificent Mile decorated to celebrate the Cubs

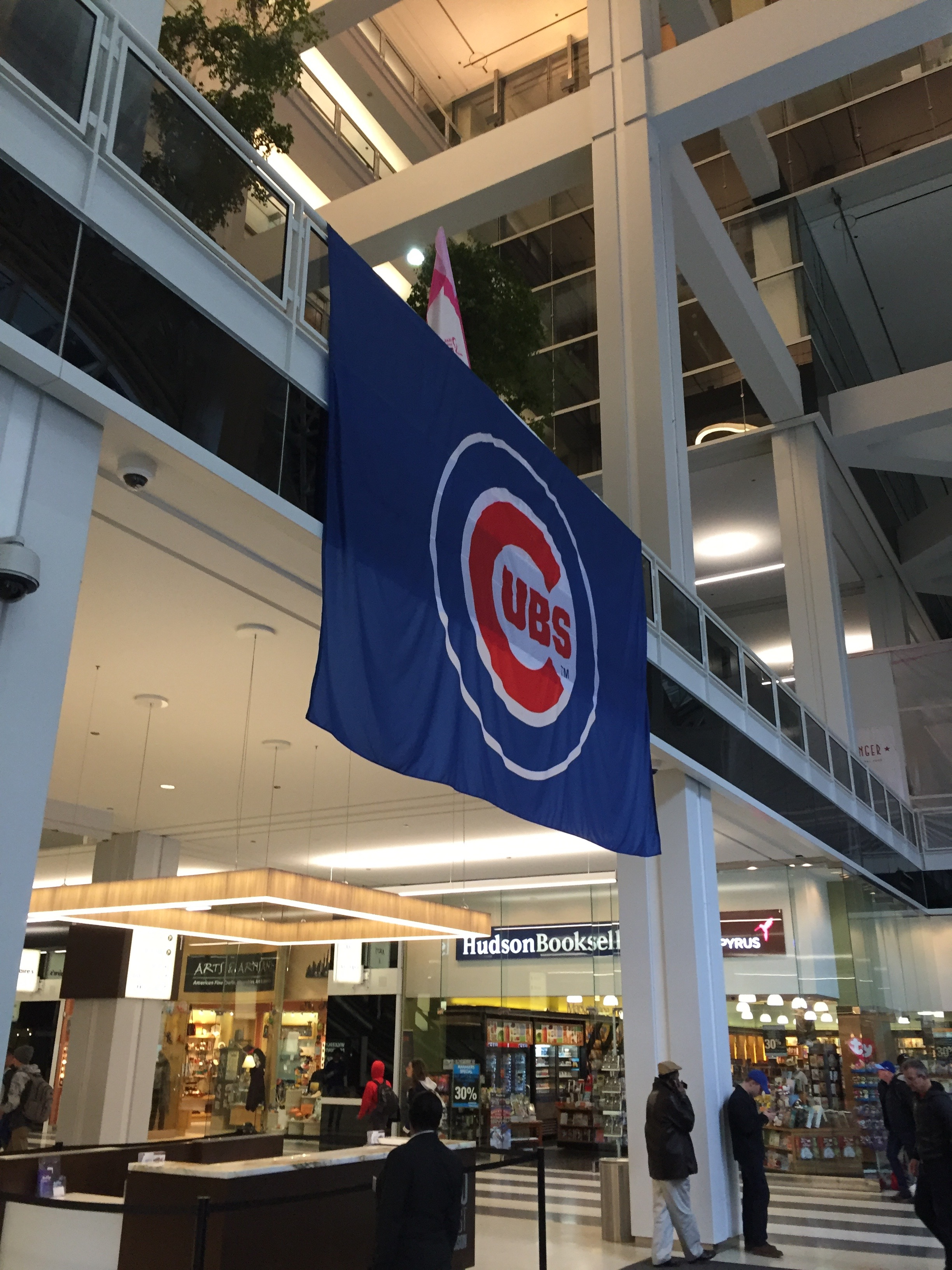
The foyer of 500 West Madison (home to the Ogilvie Transportation Center) decorated to celebrate the Cubs during the World Series

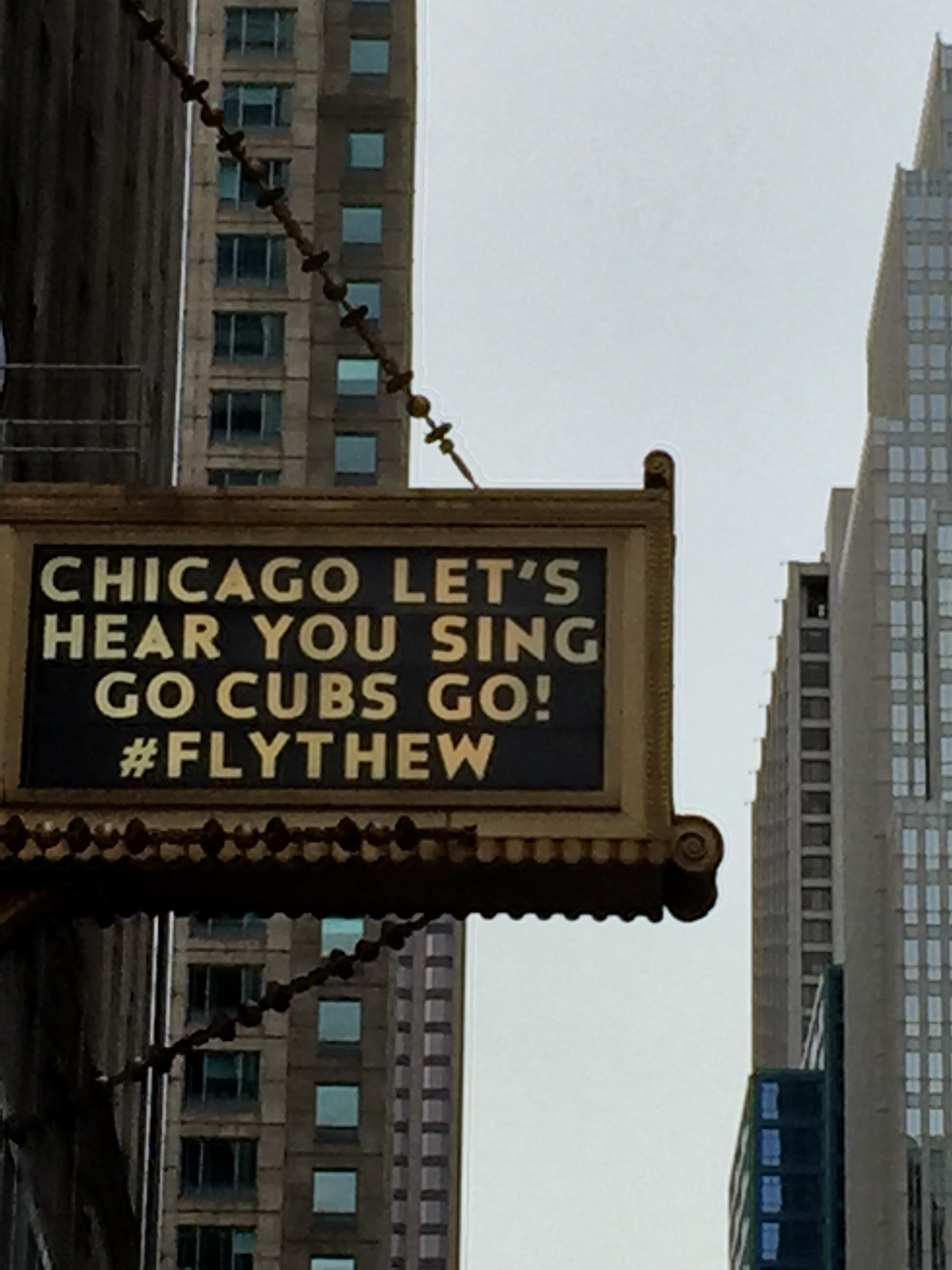
A celebratory message (referencing the song Go Cubs Go on the marquee of Chicago's Civic Opera House during the World Series

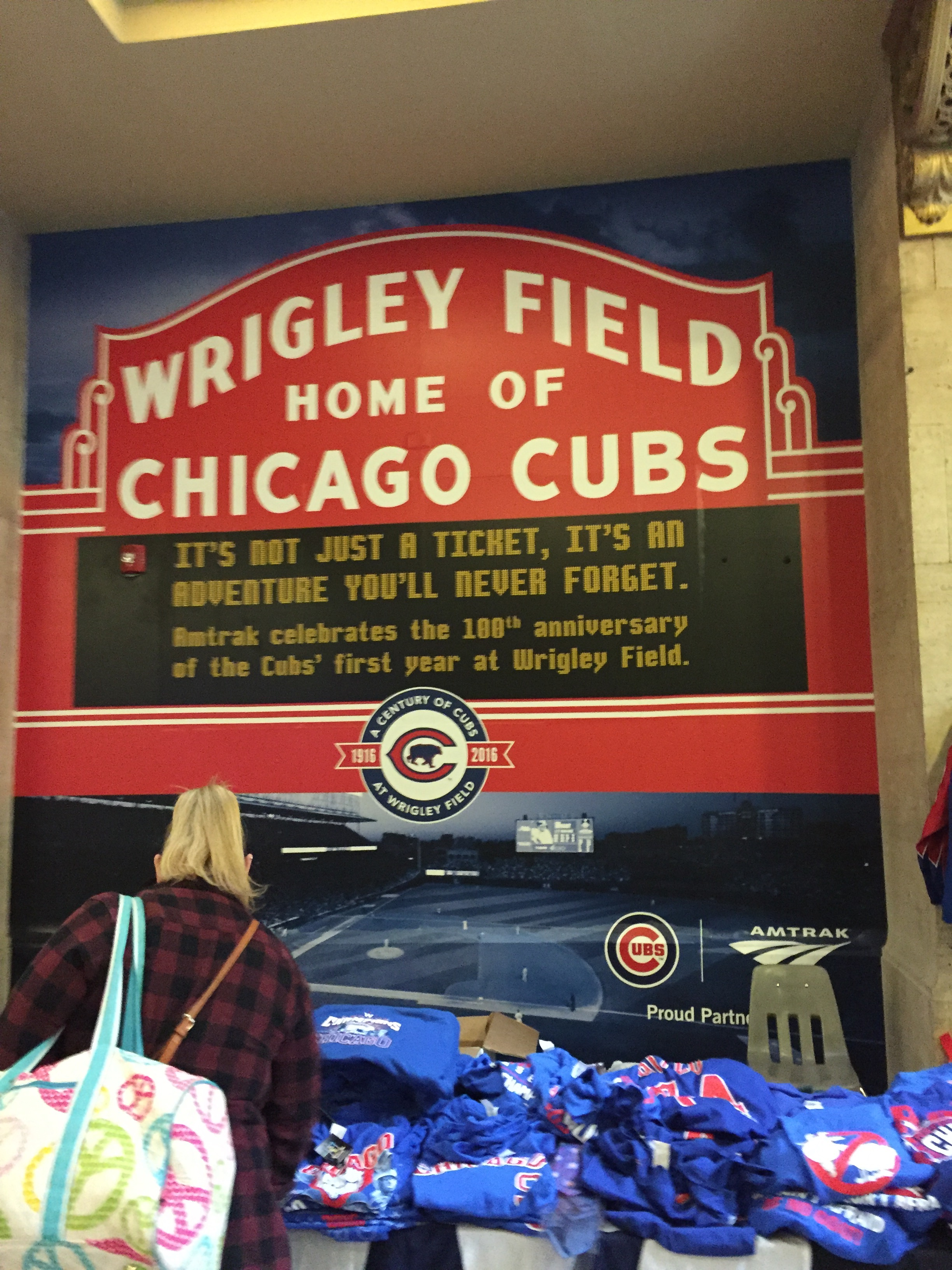
World Series merchandise being sold at a stand in Chicago Union Station (with a backdrop mimicking the Wrigley Field marquee)

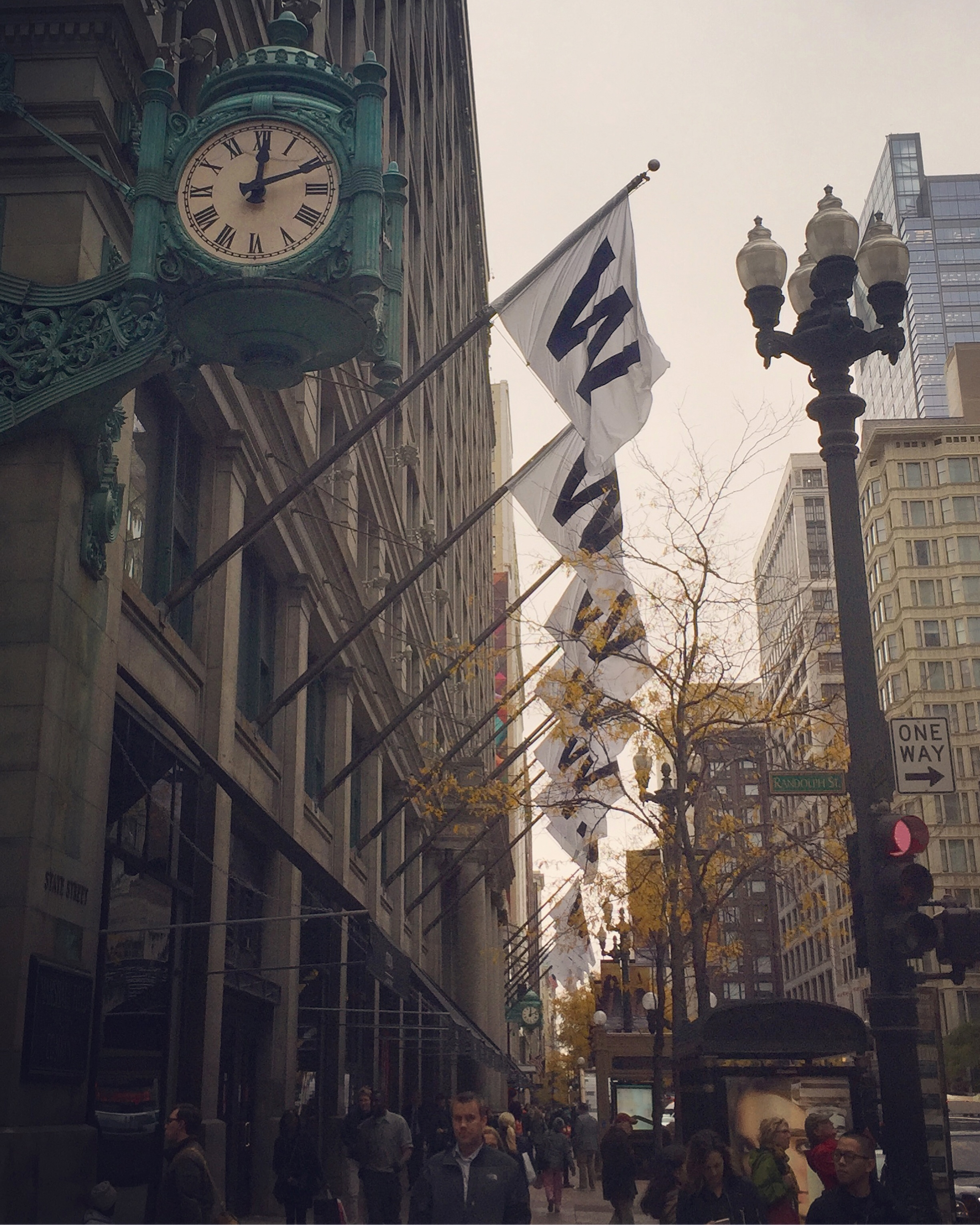
Cubs Victory Flags on the State Street frontage of the Marshall Field and Company Building during the World Series

The Cubs made their 11th appearance in the World Series; their only previous two championships were in 1907 and 1908. They lost their eight other appearances, in 1906, 1910, 1918, 1929, 1932, 1935, 1938, and 1945. The Cubs' 107 season World Series victory drought was the longest league title drought in the history of the major American professional sports leagues. It was also regarded to be the most famous championship drought in American sports history. Sports folklore attributed this due to the "Curse of the Billy Goat", which was one of the most famous purported curses in baseball.

The Cubs qualified for the postseason by winning the National League Central, ending the regular season with the best record in all of MLB (103–58) for the first time since 1945; they also posted their highest winning percentage since 1935, and won their most games since 1910. The division title was their sixth since division play began in 1969, and their first since 2008. The Cubs entered the postseason as the overall #1 seed, and they defeated the 5th-seeded San Francisco Giants 3–1 of the NL Division Series before clinching their first NL pennant since 1945 with a 4–2 series win over the 3rd-seeded Los Angeles Dodgers in the NL Championship Series.

For Cubs manager Joe Maddon, it was his second appearance in the World Series as manager – in 2008, he managed the Tampa Bay Rays, who lost 4–1 to the Philadelphia Phillies. This made him the eighth person to manage pennant winning teams in both leagues. It was also Maddon's third World Series appearance overall – in 2002, he was bench coach for the Anaheim Angels. The Cubs returned star Kyle Schwarber for the World Series, who was previously thought to have a season ending ACL injury.

=== Cleveland Indians ===
The Indians made their sixth appearance in the World Series. They won two championships in 1920 and 1948. They lost their three most recent appearances in the Fall Classic in 1954, 1995, and 1997. Their 67-season (at the time) World Series victory drought was the second-longest ongoing drought at the time, behind only the Cubs.

The Indians qualified for the postseason by winning the American League Central, their eighth division title and their first since 2007. The Indians were the #2 seed in the American League, and they defeated the 3rd-seeded Boston Red Sox 3–0 in the AL Division Series before clinching the pennant with a 4–1 victory over the 4th-seeded Toronto Blue Jays in the AL Championship Series.

For Indians manager Terry Francona, it was his third appearance in the World Series. He won his previous two appearances – 2004 and 2007 – as manager of the Boston Red Sox, in sweeps of the St. Louis Cardinals and the Colorado Rockies.

This was the third postseason meeting between Francona and Maddon. Maddon's Rays defeated Francona's Red Sox in the 2008 American League Championship Series, while Maddon's Rays defeated Francona's Indians in the 2013 American League Wild Card Game. The Cleveland Indians were severely depleted heading into the series, missing all star starting pitchers Danny Salazar and Carlos Carrasco for the Fall Classic. They were also missing all star Michael Brantley.

== Summary ==
Chicago (NL) won the series, 4–3.

Game	Date	Score	Location	Time	Attendance
1	October 25	Chicago Cubs – 0, Cleveland Indians – 6	Progressive Field	3:37	38,091
2	October 26	Chicago Cubs – 5, Cleveland Indians – 1	Progressive Field	4:04	38,172
3	October 28	Cleveland Indians – 1, Chicago Cubs – 0	Wrigley Field	3:33	41,703
4	October 29	Cleveland Indians – 7, Chicago Cubs – 2	Wrigley Field	3:16	41,706
5	October 30	Cleveland Indians – 2, Chicago Cubs – 3	Wrigley Field	3:27	41,711
6	November 1	Chicago Cubs – 9, Cleveland Indians – 3	Progressive Field	3:29	38,116
7	November 2	Chicago Cubs – 8, Cleveland Indians – 7 (10)	Progressive Field	4:28 (:17 delay)	38,104

== Matchups ==
=== Game 1 ===
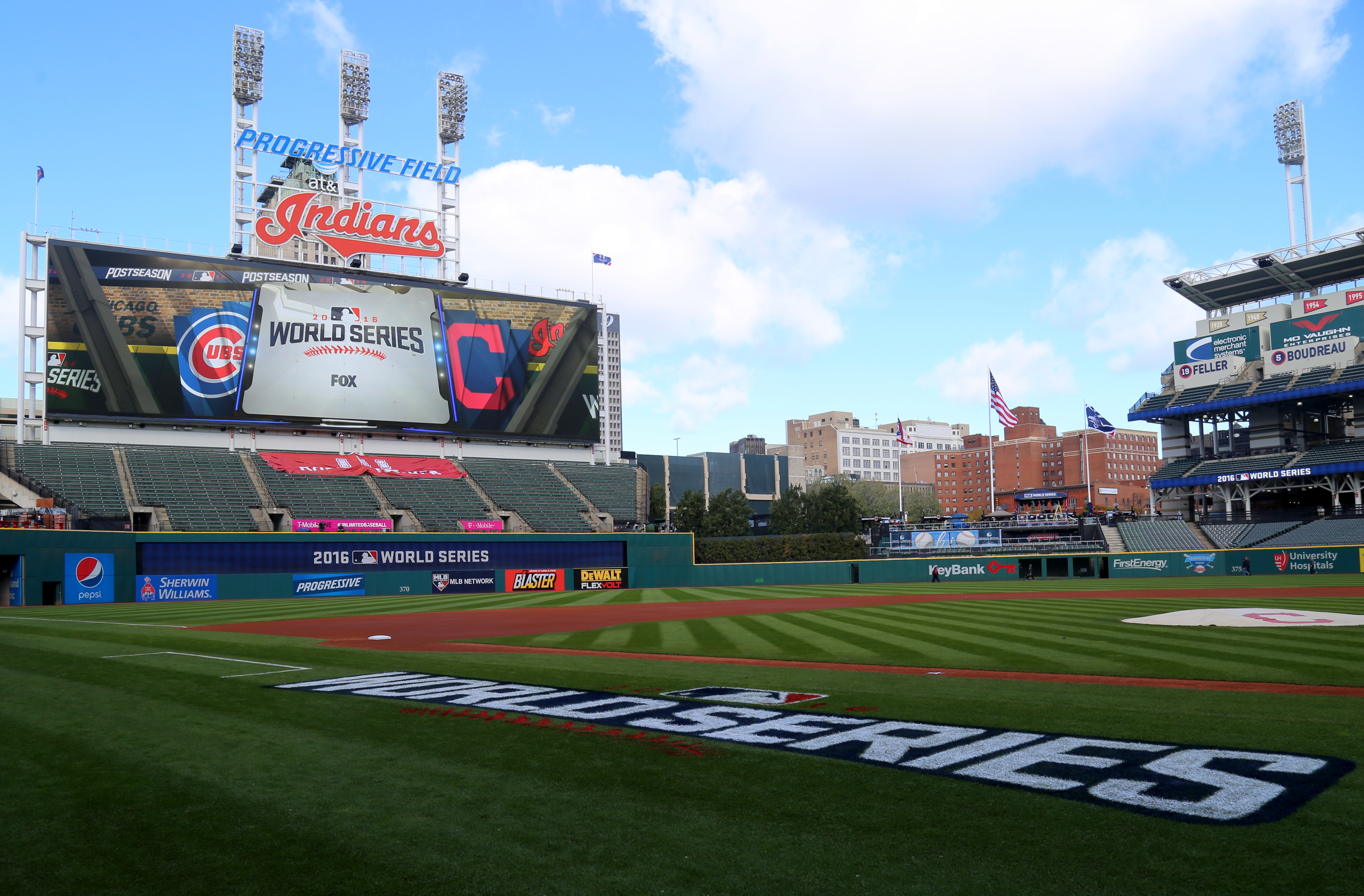
Progressive Field, a few hours before Game 1 of the 2016 World Series

October 25, 2016 8:10 pm (EDT) at Progressive Field in Cleveland, Ohio, 50 °F (10 °C), cloudy
Team	1	2	3	4	5	6	7	8	9	R	H	E
Chicago	0	0	0	0	0	0	0	0	0	0	7	0
Cleveland	2	0	0	1	0	0	0	3	X	6	10	0
WP: Corey Kluber (1–0) LP: Jon Lester (0–1); Home runs: CHC: None; CLE: Roberto Pérez 2 (2); Attendance: 38,091; Boxscore

Former Indians and Cubs player Kenny Lofton threw the ceremonial first pitch before Game 1 while Rachel Platten sang the national anthem. Corey Kluber started for the Indians, and Jon Lester started for the Cubs. Kyle Schwarber, who had missed nearly all of the 2016 season after tearing ligaments in his left leg in the season's third game, was added to the Cubs' World Series roster and started as their designated hitter. Schwarber struck out twice, but also doubled and drew a walk. The double made Schwarber the first non-pitcher to get his first hit of the season in the World Series.

Kluber made World Series history by striking out eight hitters in the first three innings. Roberto Pérez became the first ever ninth-place hitter with two homers in a World Series game, the first Indians player to hit two homers in a Series game, and the first Puerto Rican-born player to hit two homers in a World Series game. In the first, the Indians loaded the bases off Lester on a single and two walks before José Ramírez's single drove in a run, then Lester hit Brandon Guyer with a pitch to force in another. Perez's home run in the fourth made it 3–0 Indians. In the eighth, Justin Grimm walked Guyer with two outs and allowed a single to Lonnie Chisenhall, then Hector Rondon allowed Perez's second home run of the night. Andrew Miller and Cody Allen finished the victory for the Indians despite Miller having to pitch out of a bases-loaded jam in the seventh, and the Indians took Game 1 of the series 6–0. Francona's World Series winning streak reached nine with this victory.

Leading off the first inning, Dexter Fowler became the first African-American to play for the Cubs in a World Series.

=== Game 2 ===
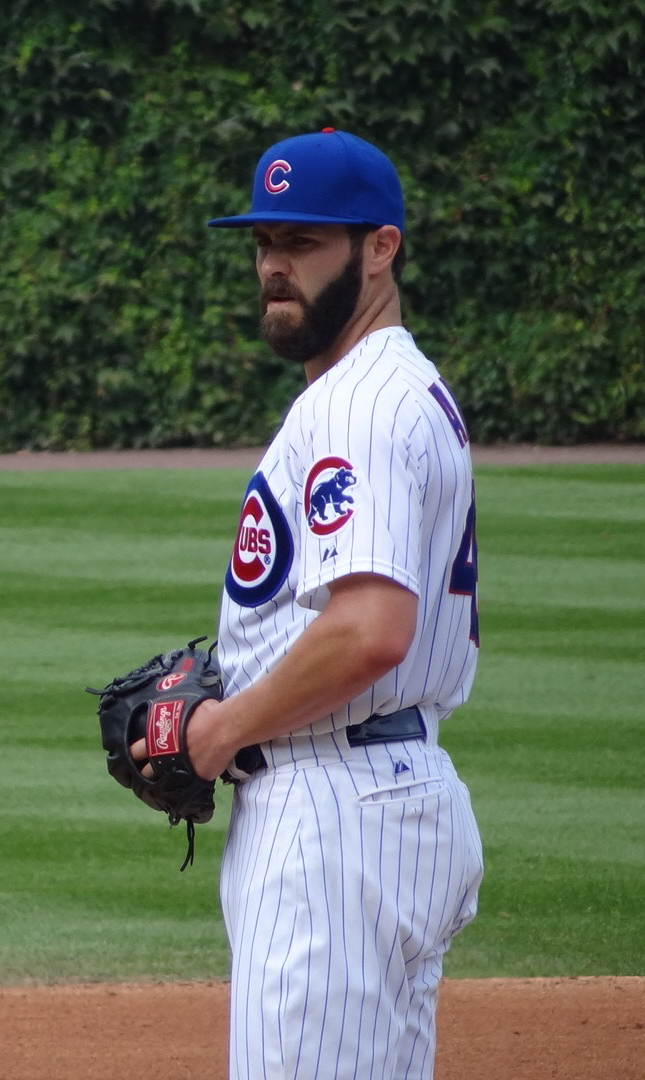
Jake Arrieta earned the win in Game 2.

October 26, 2016 7:08 pm (EDT) at Progressive Field in Cleveland, Ohio, 43 °F (6 °C), cloudy
Team	1	2	3	4	5	6	7	8	9	R	H	E
Chicago	1	0	1	0	3	0	0	0	0	5	9	0
Cleveland	0	0	0	0	0	1	0	0	0	1	4	2
WP: Jake Arrieta (1–0) LP: Trevor Bauer (0–1); Attendance: 38,172; Boxscore

Former Indians player Carlos Baerga threw the ceremonial first pitch before Game 2 while LoCash performed the national anthem. The start time for the game was moved up an hour, because of the possibility of heavy rain in the forecast. Looking to tie the series at one game apiece, the Cubs sent Jake Arrieta to the mound against the Indians' Trevor Bauer who was still healing a lacerated pinkie resulting from an accident with a drone. The Cubs also featured six players under age 25 in the starting lineup, a postseason record. The Cubs started things off early as Kris Bryant singled in the first inning and Anthony Rizzo doubled to score Bryant and give the Cubs an early 1–0 lead. Arrieta started well too, retiring the first two batters before walking back-to-back batters in the bottom of the first. However, Arrieta got a flyout to end the inning. The Cubs struck again in the third following a two-out walk by Rizzo and a single by Ben Zobrist. A single by Kyle Schwarber scored Rizzo from second and pushed the Cubs' lead to 2–0. Bauer was forced from the game in the fourth, and the Cubs struck again in the fifth. Rizzo walked again off Zach McAllister, and Zobrist tripled to plate Rizzo. Another run-scoring single by Schwarber off Bryan Shaw and a bases-loaded walk by Addison Russell pushed the lead to 5–0.

Arrieta continued to pitch well, walking three batters but holding the Indians without a hit into the sixth inning. In the sixth, a double by Jason Kipnis ended the no-hitter, moved to third on a groundout and scored the lone Indians run of the game on a wild pitch by Arrieta. Arrieta allowed another single and was lifted for reliever Mike Montgomery. Both teams threatened in the seventh but could not score and, following a single by Mike Napoli in the bottom of the eighth, Aroldis Chapman entered to finish the game for the Cubs. The win marked the Cubs' first World Series game victory since 1945 and tied up the series at one game all. The game marked Indians manager Terry Francona's first loss in ten World Series games.

=== Game 3 ===
News report by Voice of America about the first World Series game at Wrigley Field in 71 years

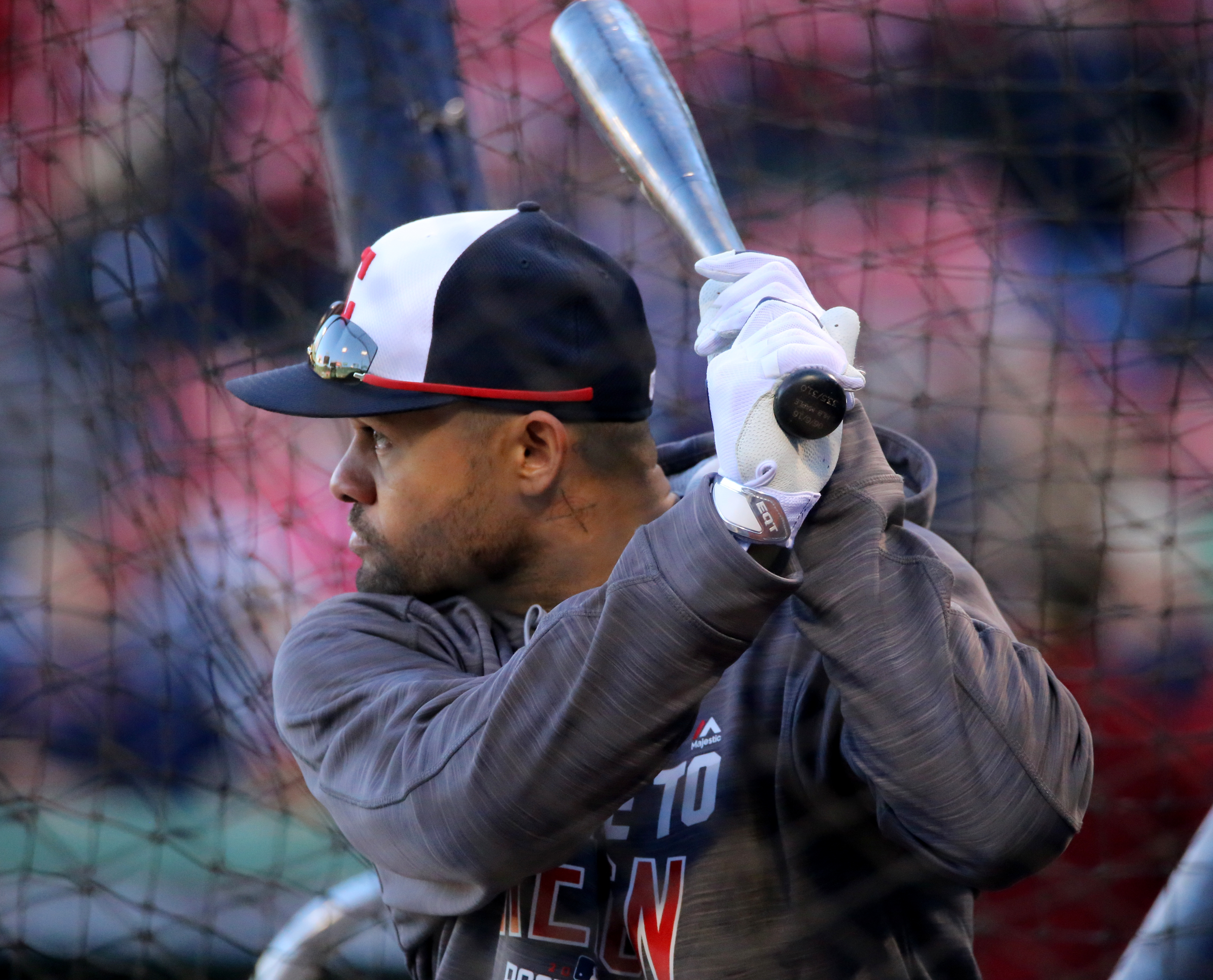
Coco Crisp drove in Game 3's only run.

October 28, 2016 7:08 pm (CDT) at Wrigley Field in Chicago, Illinois, 62 °F (17 °C), partly cloudy
Team	1	2	3	4	5	6	7	8	9	R	H	E
Cleveland	0	0	0	0	0	0	1	0	0	1	8	1
Chicago	0	0	0	0	0	0	0	0	0	0	5	0
WP: Andrew Miller (1–0) LP: Carl Edwards Jr. (0–1) Sv: Cody Allen (1); Attendance: 41,703; Boxscore

For Game 3, former Cubs player Billy Williams threw the ceremonial first pitch before the start of the game, Fall Out Boy lead singer Patrick Stump sang the national anthem, and Bill Murray sang "Take Me Out to the Ball Game" during the seventh-inning stretch, to mark the Cubs' first World Series night game at home. Chicago pitcher Kyle Hendricks started against Cleveland pitcher Josh Tomlin.

The game's only run came off a Coco Crisp single that scored Michael Martínez from third in the seventh inning. Josh Tomlin, Andrew Miller, Bryan Shaw, and Cody Allen combined to shut out the Cubs. Allen earned his sixth postseason save as Javier Báez struck out swinging to end the game, leaving the tying and winning runs in scoring position. It was the fourth time in which the Cubs had lost in a shutout during the 2016 postseason.

=== Game 4 ===
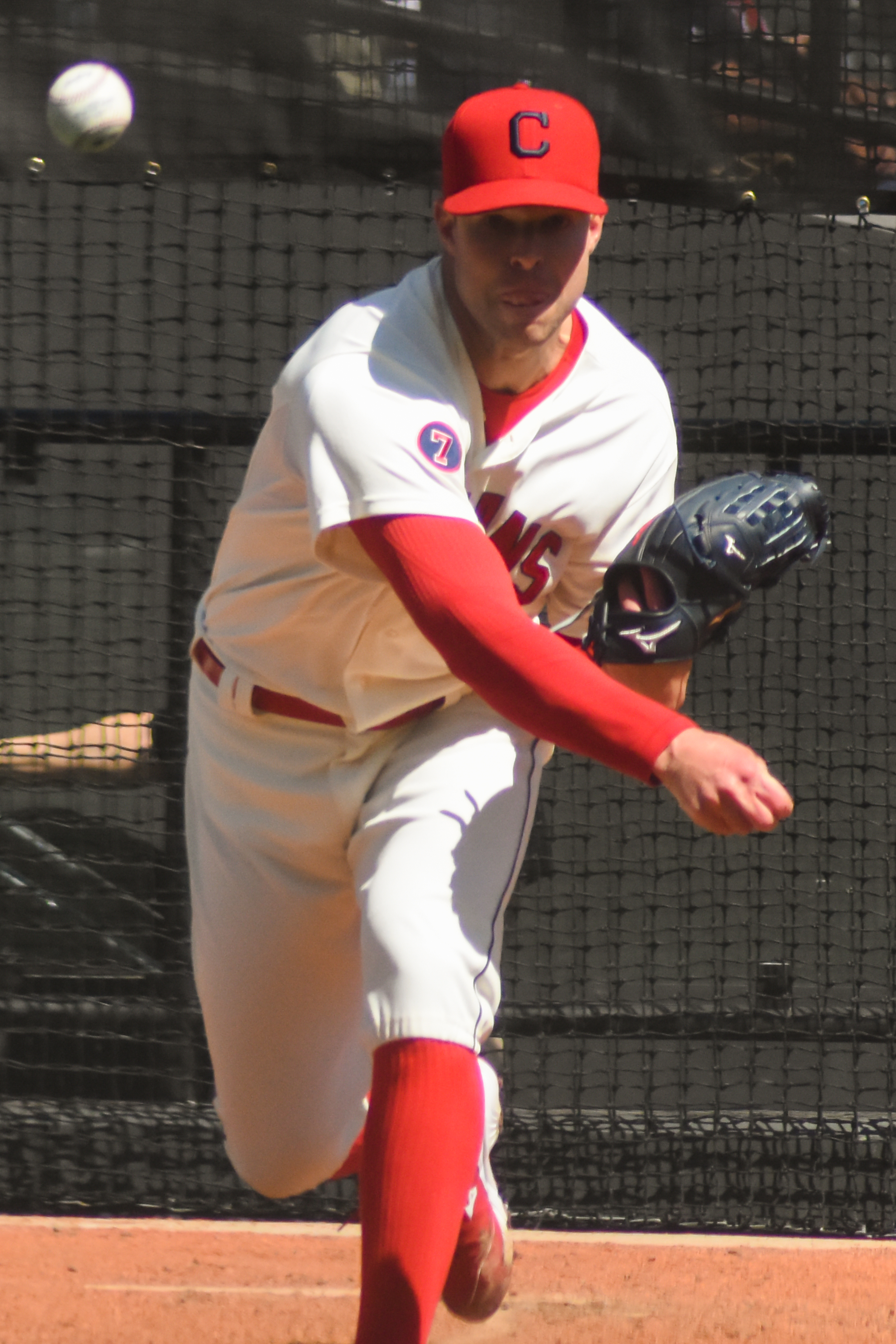
Corey Kluber earned his second win of the series in Game 4.

October 29, 2016 7:09 pm (CDT) at Wrigley Field in Chicago, Illinois, 59 °F (15 °C), cloudy
Team	1	2	3	4	5	6	7	8	9	R	H	E
Cleveland	0	2	1	0	0	1	3	0	0	7	10	0
Chicago	1	0	0	0	0	0	0	1	0	2	7	2
WP: Corey Kluber (2–0) LP: John Lackey (0–1); Home runs: CLE: Carlos Santana (1), Jason Kipnis (1); CHC: Dexter Fowler (1); Attendance: 41,706; Boxscore

For Game 4, former Cubs pitchers Greg Maddux and Ferguson Jenkins threw the ceremonial first pitches before the start of the game while Cubs anthem singer John Vincent sang the national anthem, and actor Vince Vaughn sang "Take Me Out to the Ball Game" during the seventh-inning stretch.

The Cubs struck first when Dexter Fowler doubled to lead off the first and scored on Anthony Rizzo's one-out single, but Kluber held them to that one run through six innings before Francona turned it over to the bullpen. In the second, Carlos Santana's leadoff home run off Lackey tied the game; then, with two on, Kluber's RBI single put the Indians up 2–1. Kris Bryant committed two errors in that inning. Next inning, Jason Kipnis hit a leadoff double and scored on Francisco Lindor's single. In the sixth, Lonnie Chisenhall's sacrifice fly with two on off Mike Montgomery made it 4–1 Indians. Next inning, Justin Grimm allowed a leadoff double and one-out hit-by-pitch before being relieved by Travis Wood, who gave up a three-run home run to Kipnis put to the Indians ahead 7–1. The Cubs got one run back in the eighth, on a Dexter Fowler home run off Andrew Miller, which was the first run he gave up in the post-season. With the victory, the Indians were just one win away from their 1st World Series championship since 1948.

=== Game 5 ===
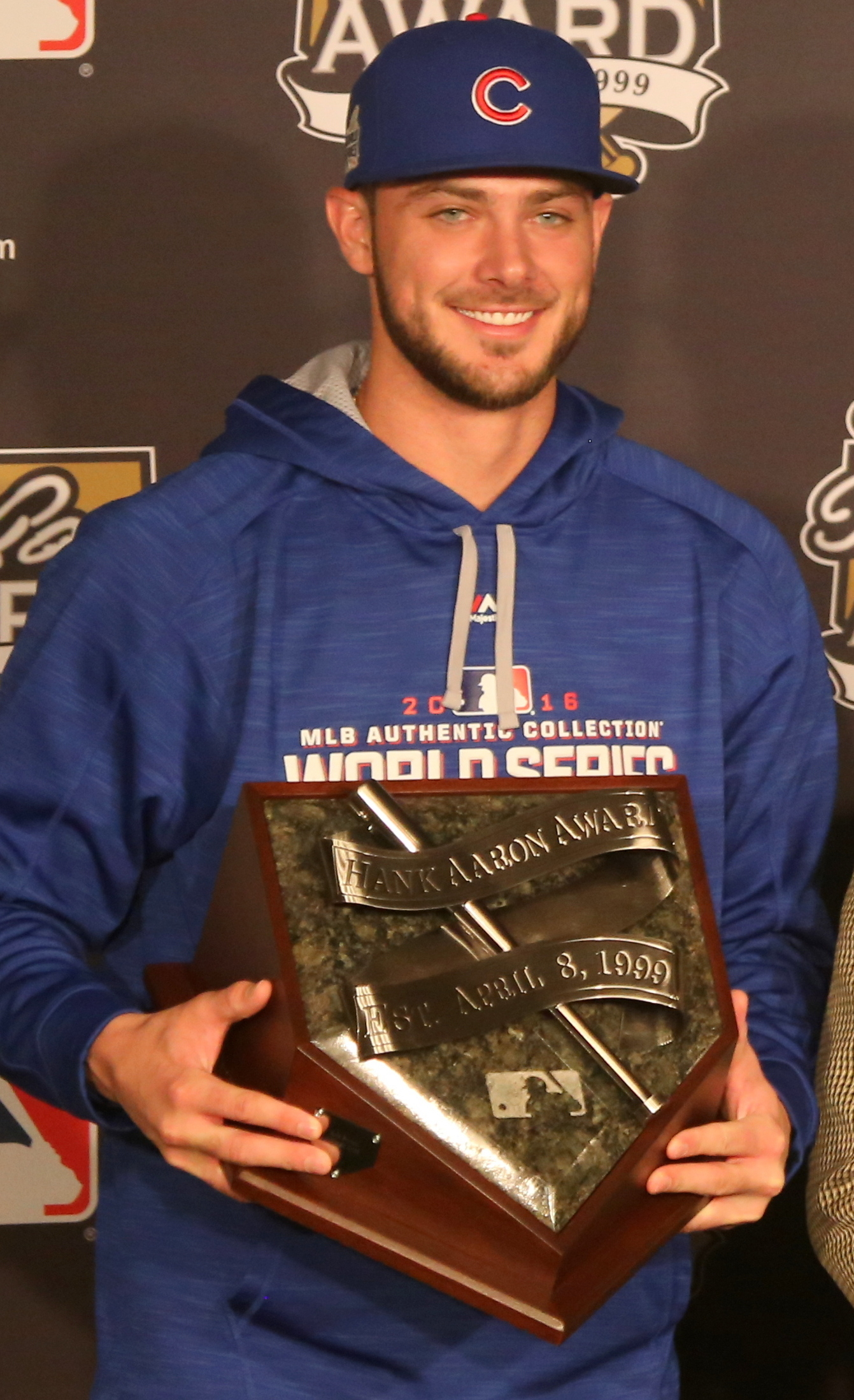
Kris Bryant hit a home run for the Cubs in Game 5.

October 30, 2016 7:17 pm (CDT) at Wrigley Field in Chicago, Illinois, 50 °F (10 °C), cloudy
Team	1	2	3	4	5	6	7	8	9	R	H	E
Cleveland	0	1	0	0	0	1	0	0	0	2	6	1
Chicago	0	0	0	3	0	0	0	0	X	3	7	0
WP: Jon Lester (1–1) LP: Trevor Bauer (0–2) Sv: Aroldis Chapman (1); Home runs: CLE: José Ramírez (1); CHC: Kris Bryant (1); Attendance: 41,711; Boxscore

For Game 5, former Cubs star and Hall of Fame member Ryne Sandberg threw the ceremonial first pitch before the start of the game, former Cubs public address announcer and former Chicago Blackhawks anthem singer Wayne Messmer performed the national anthem, and Pearl Jam lead singer Eddie Vedder (a Chicago native and die hard Cubs fan) sang "Take Me Out to the Ball Game" during the seventh-inning stretch. José Ramírez hit a home run for Cleveland in the second inning off Jon Lester, but the Cubs, facing elimination, scored three runs in the fourth inning off Trevor Bauer. Kris Bryant led off the inning with a home run. After Bryant's home run, Anthony Rizzo doubled and Ben Zobrist singled. Addison Russell's RBI single put the Cubs up 2–1. After Jason Heyward struck out, Javier Baez's bunt single moved Zobrist to third before David Ross's sacrifice fly made it 3–1 Cubs. The Indians cut their deficit to 3–2 off Lester in the sixth on Francisco Lindor's RBI single that scored Rajai Davis from second base. With the tying run on second base in the seventh inning, Maddon brought in Aroldis Chapman, who threw 2 2/3 scoreless innings, earning his first save of the series and fourth overall in the postseason. The win was the first World Series game victory for the Cubs at Wrigley Field since 1945.

=== Game 6 ===
News report by Voice of America about Game 6 and 7 at Progressive Field

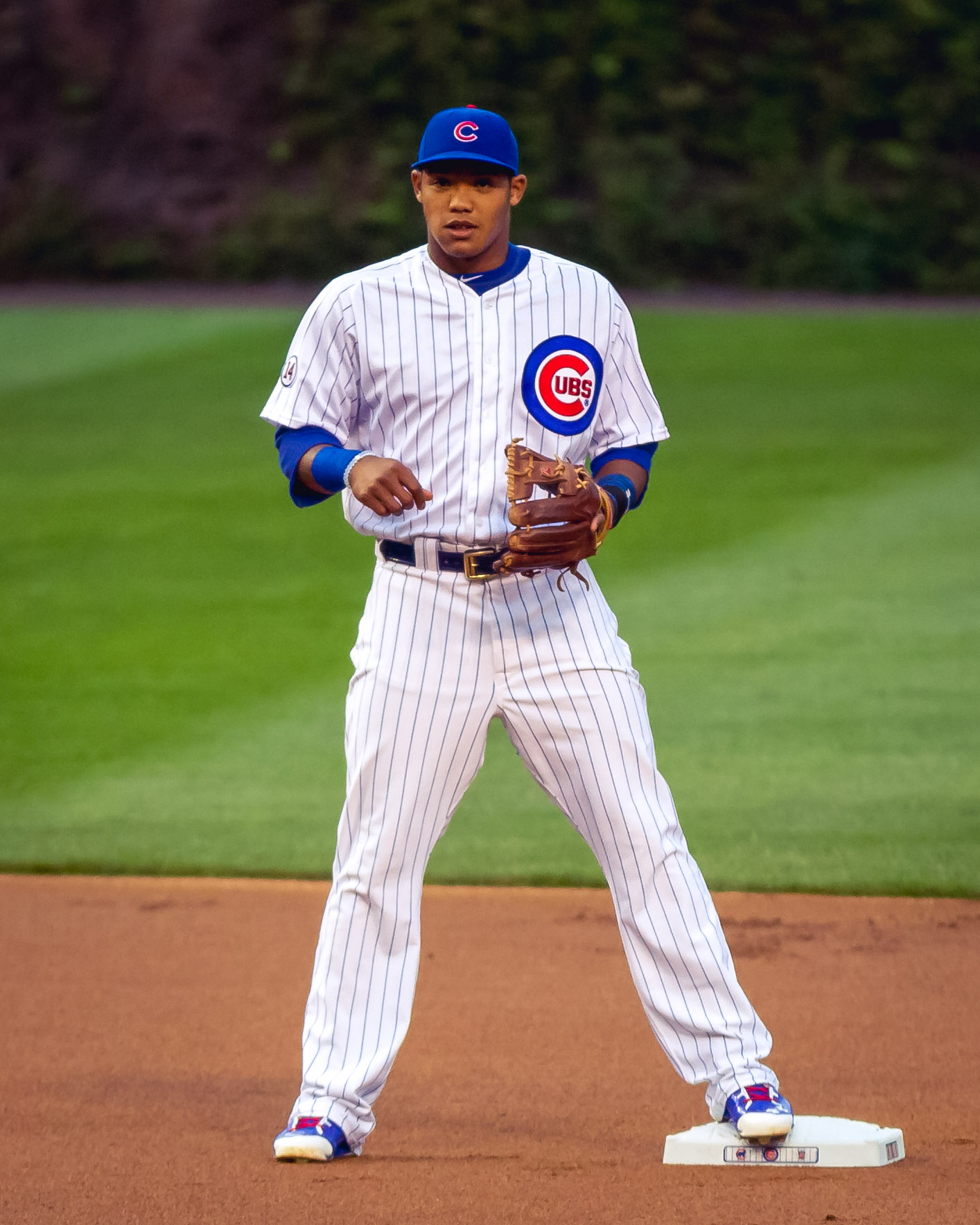
Addison Russell had six runs batted in in Game 6, tying a Series record.

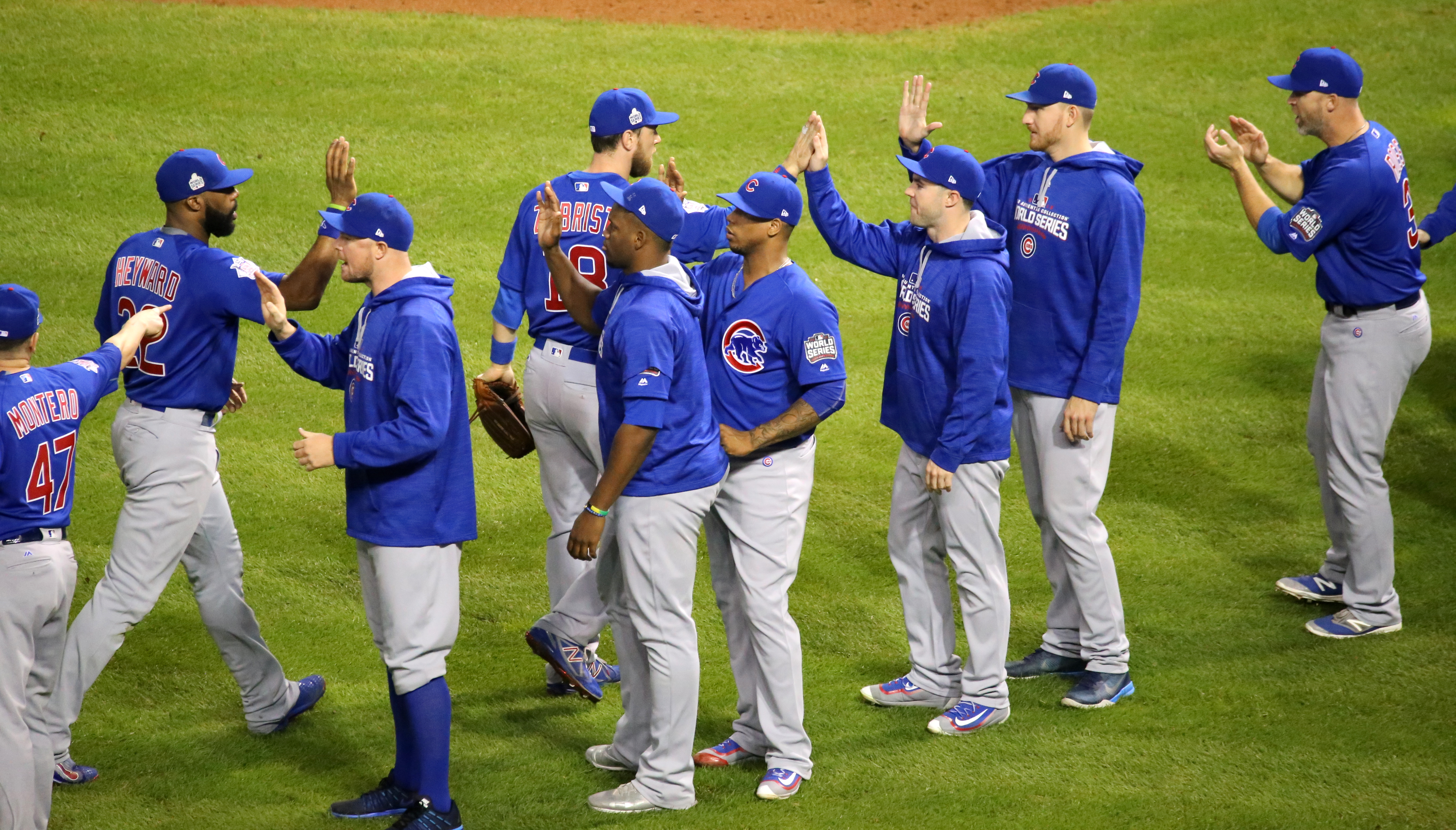
The Cubs celebrate after their 9–3 win over the Indians in World Series Game 6

November 1, 2016 8:10 pm (EDT) at Progressive Field in Cleveland, Ohio, 71 °F (22 °C), partly cloudy
Team	1	2	3	4	5	6	7	8	9	R	H	E
Chicago	3	0	4	0	0	0	0	0	2	9	13	0
Cleveland	0	0	0	1	1	0	0	0	1	3	6	1
WP: Jake Arrieta (2–0) LP: Josh Tomlin (0–1); Home runs: CHC: Kris Bryant (2), Addison Russell (1), Anthony Rizzo (1); CLE: Jason Kipnis (2); Attendance: 38,116; Boxscore

The last living member of Cleveland's 1948 World Series championship team, Eddie Robinson, attended Game 6 at Progressive Field. Former Indians pitcher Dennis Martínez threw out the ceremonial first pitch before the game while country singer Hunter Hayes sang the national anthem.

The Cubs scored three runs in the first inning, all with two outs, on a Kris Bryant home run and a two-run double by Addison Russell after two singles off Josh Tomlin. In the third inning, the Cubs loaded the bases on a walk and two singles off Tomlin, who was relieved by Dan Otero. Following the pitching change, Russell hit the 19th grand slam in World Series history to extend the Cubs lead to 7–0. Russell's grand slam was the first in a World Series game since Paul Konerko of the crosstown Chicago White Sox in 2005, as well as the first by a visiting player since Lonnie Smith in 1992. In the bottom of the fourth, Mike Napoli drove in Jason Kipnis, who doubled to lead off, with an RBI single to cut the deficit to 7–1. In the bottom of the fifth, Kipnis drove a ball over the left field wall for a home run to make it a 7–2 game. In the top of the ninth with a runner on and two outs, Anthony Rizzo hit a two-run home run to right to make it 9–2. In the bottom of the inning, Aroldis Chapman allowed a leadoff walk to Brandon Guyer and was relieved by Pedro Strop, who threw a wild pitch to move Guyer to second and Roberto Perez's RBI single made it 9–3 Cubs with Perez thrown out at second for the second out. After Carlos Santana walked, Travis Wood relieved Strop and got Jason Kipnis to pop out to short to end the game and force a Game 7.

Russell's six RBIs tied a World Series single-game record. Arrieta became the first NL starting pitcher to notch two road wins in a single World Series since Bob Gibson in 1967.

=== Game 7 ===
External videos
- Game 7 Full replay on the MLB's official YouTube channel

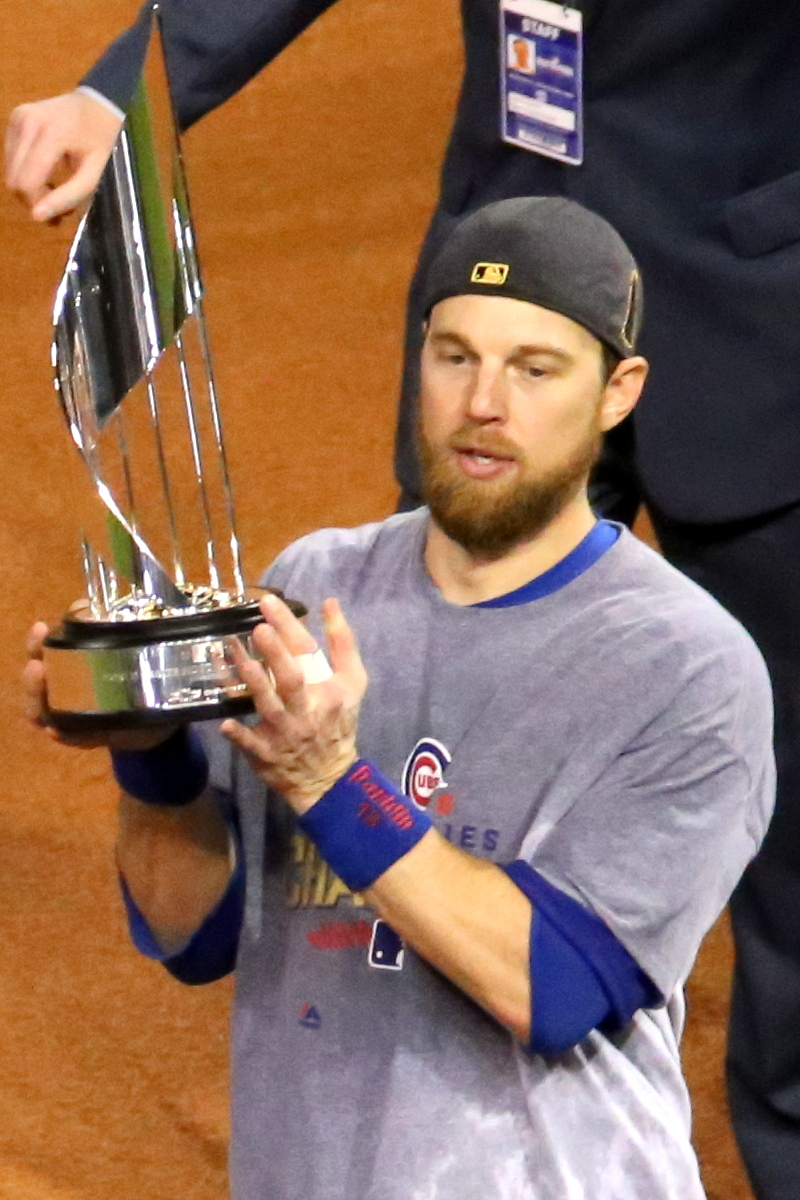
Ben Zobrist won the World Series Most Valuable Player Award.

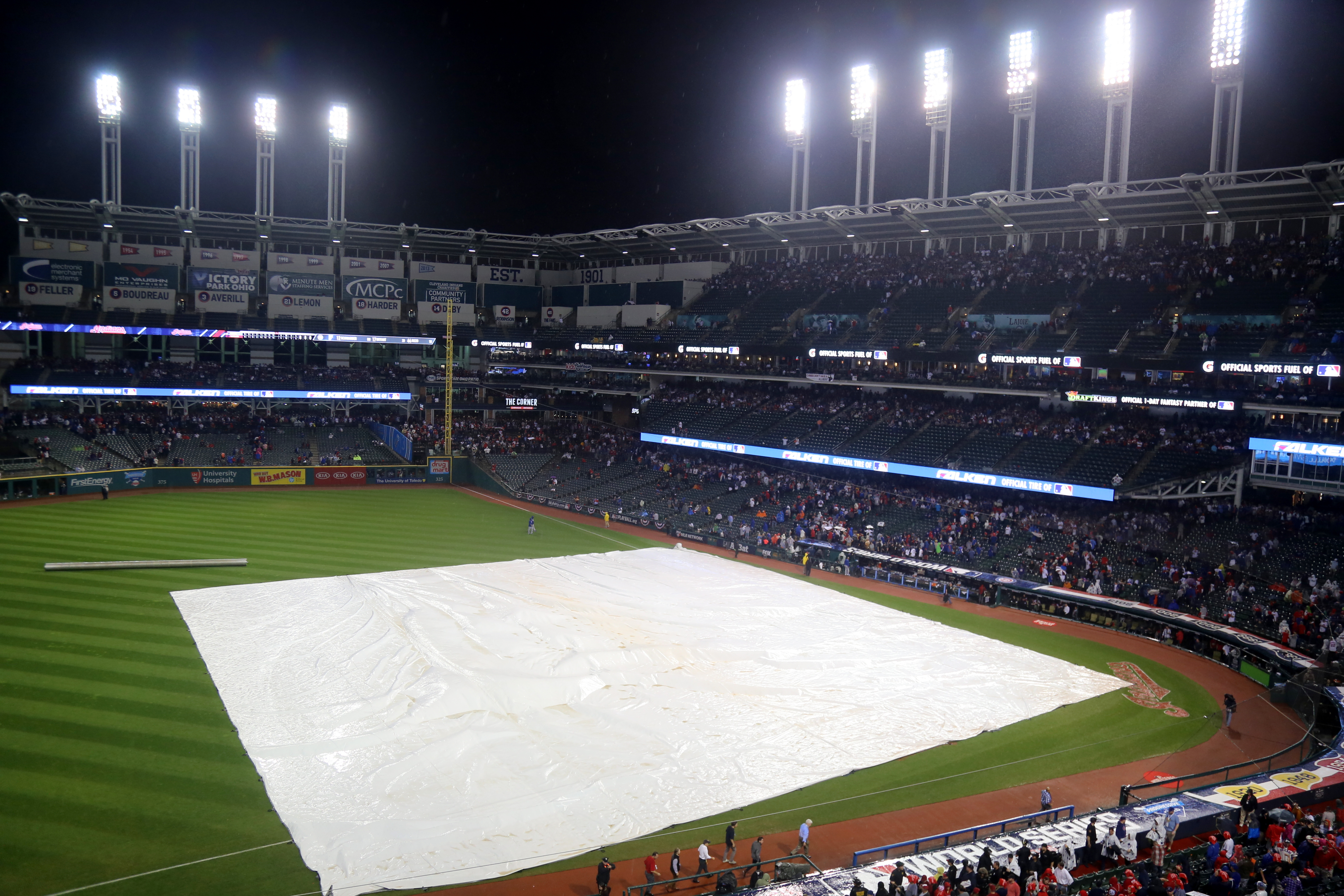
The tarp on the field during the 17 minute rain delay.

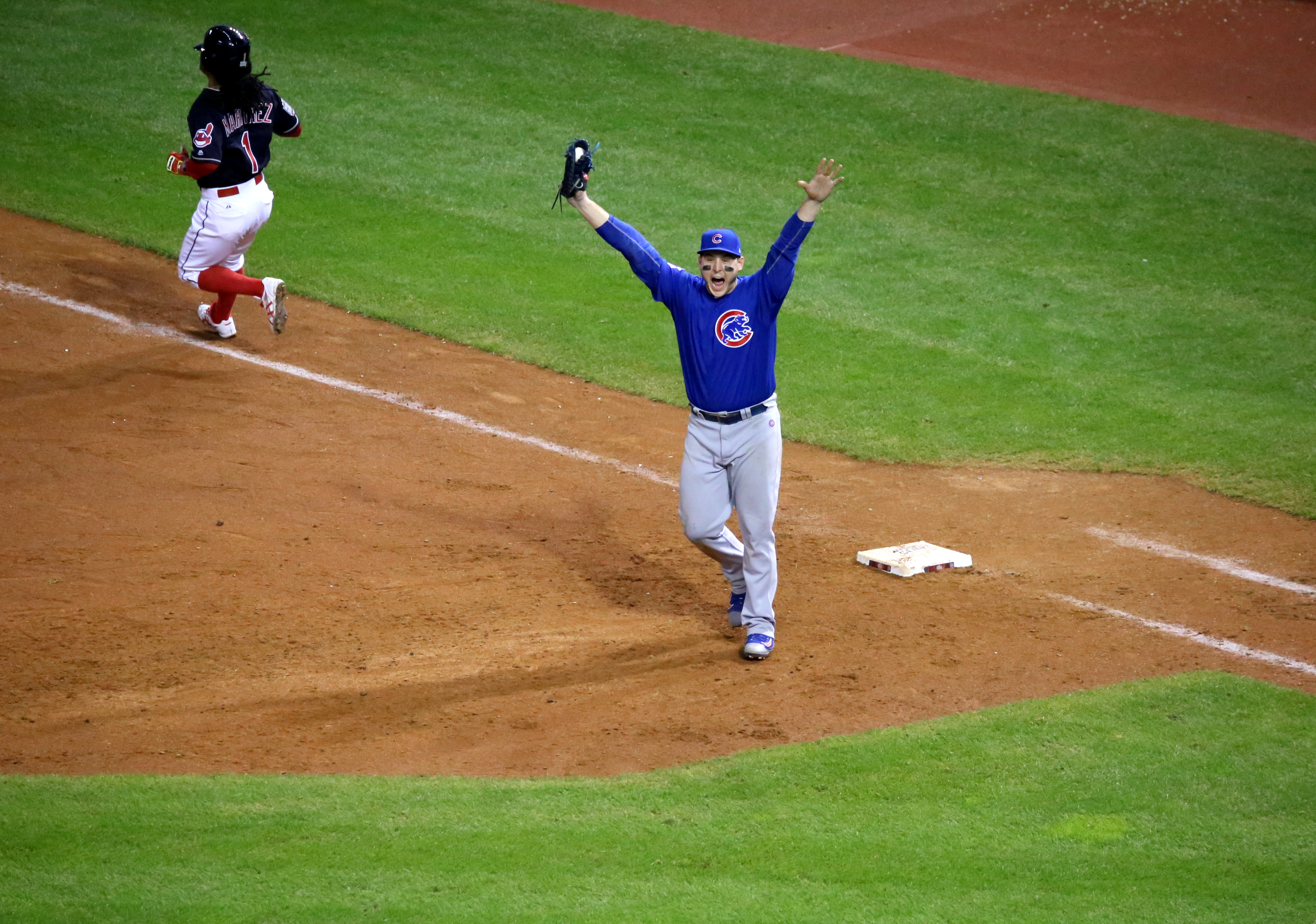
Cubs first baseman Anthony Rizzo celebrates the final out of the 2016 World Series, after his putout.

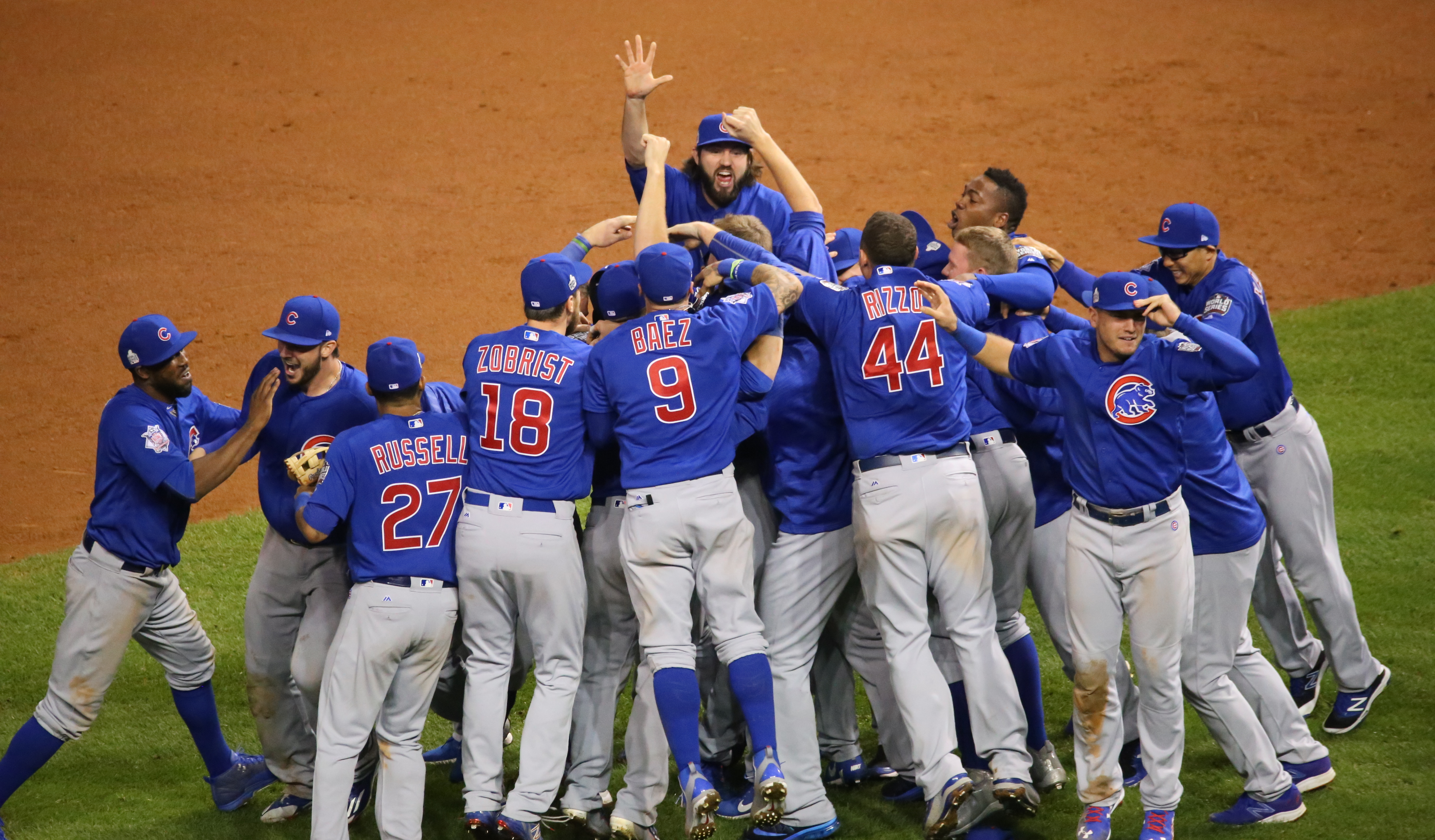
Chicago Cubs celebrate their World Series championship victory.

November 2, 2016 8:02 pm (EDT) at Progressive Field in Cleveland, Ohio, 69 °F (21 °C), partly cloudy
Team	1	2	3	4	5	6	7	8	9	10	R	H	E
Chicago	1	0	0	2	2	1	0	0	0	2	8	13	3
Cleveland	0	0	1	0	2	0	0	3	0	1	7	11	1
WP: Aroldis Chapman (1–0) LP: Bryan Shaw (0–1) Sv: Mike Montgomery (1); Home runs: CHC: Dexter Fowler (2), Javier Báez (1), David Ross (1); CLE: Rajai Davis (1); Attendance: 38,104; Boxscore

Game 7 of the series would go down as a classic, with some calling it the greatest Game 7 in World Series history, comparing it to 1924, 1960, 1991, 1997, and 2001 for its drama and tension. Former Indians player Jim Thome threw the ceremonial first pitch before the game while members of the Cleveland Orchestra string section performed the national anthem. The pitching matchup was between MLB earned run average (ERA) champion Kyle Hendricks, who had started Game 3 for the Cubs, and Corey Kluber, who had won games 1 and 4 and was pitching on three days' rest. Kluber came into the game 4–1 in the postseason with a 0.89 ERA.

Dexter Fowler led off the game with a home run for Chicago off Kluber, becoming the first player ever to hit a lead-off home run in a World Series Game 7. The Indians tied the game in the bottom of the third inning when Coco Crisp doubled, advanced to third on a Roberto Pérez sacrifice bunt, and scored on an RBI single by Carlos Santana. Jason Kipnis then reached when his ground ball was mishandled at second by Javier Báez to put two men on, but Hendricks retired Mike Napoli on a lineout to third. The Cubs scored two runs in the fourth inning. Kris Bryant singled and Anthony Rizzo was hit by a pitch to put men on first and second. Kluber got Ben Zobrist to ground into a fielder's choice with Rizzo out at second for one out, but then allowed a sacrifice fly from Addison Russell (Bryant ran aggressively to tag up from third on the short fly ball and slide under the tag at home) and a double by Willson Contreras to score Zobrist. To start the fifth inning, Baez hit a home run to center making it 4–1 on the first pitch he saw to knock Kluber out of the game. ALCS MVP Andrew Miller came on in relief and gave up a walk to Bryant and RBI single to Anthony Rizzo to push the lead to 5–1 (Bryant's aggressiveness again instrumental as he was attempting to steal second on the hit, allowing him to score all the way from first). In the bottom of the fifth inning, Hendricks retired the first two batters. A two-out walk to Santana, which included a pitch that was called a ball and appeared to be a strike, persuaded Joe Maddon to relieve both his starter and the catcher. This move, along with others throughout the series, would be highly criticized afterward, as it appeared to some that Hendricks was pulled out too soon.

Jon Lester, who had started Games 1 and 5, came on in relief for the first time since the 2007 ALCS, coincidentally also against the Indians. David Ross (who usually caught for Lester and was playing in his final game) committed a throwing error on a Jason Kipnis ground ball, which allowed Santana to reach third and Kipnis to second. A wild pitch that ricocheted off Ross's helmet allowed both Santana and Kipnis to score, narrowing the Cubs' lead to 5–3. To atone for his blunders, the 39-year-old Ross hit a home run to center, in his last official at-bat of his career, in the top of the sixth to make it a 6–3 game, becoming the oldest player to hit a home run in a World Series Game 7. Miller was pulled with one out in the seventh and was replaced with Indians closer Cody Allen.

Lester retired the first two batters in the eighth inning, but was pulled after a José Ramírez single that Russell did not field cleanly at short. Maddon opted to use Aroldis Chapman, who had thrown 42 pitches in Game 5 and had also pitched in Game 6, despite the fact that the Cubs had already built a large lead. Brandon Guyer promptly hit a run-scoring double off Chapman, making the score 6–4. The next batter was Indians center fielder Rajai Davis, who had hit 55 career home runs in 11 seasons entering this game, and who was hitting .132 in the postseason up to that point. Davis hit a dramatic 2-run home run off Chapman, just barely clearing the left field wall and the left field foul pole, scoring Guyer and tying the game, making the score 6–6. Prior to Miguel Rojas's 9th inning game-tying home run in 2025's Game 7, Davis's home run was the latest-occurring game-tying home run in World Series Game 7 history. Many fans and Chapman himself believe he blew the lead due to his unnecessary use in Game 6.

The Cubs squandered a scoring chance in the top of the 9th with Allen still on the mound. Ross led off with a walk and Jason Heyward grounded into a fielder's choice to take pinch runner Chris Coghlan off the bases. Bryan Shaw relieved Allen, and during Javier Baez's at bat, Heyward stole second and advanced to third when Gomes's throw got away from Kipnis and went into the outfield for an error. At this point, Cleveland's Terry Francona made a defensive substitution: Coco Crisp was replaced by inserting Michael Martinez in right and moving Guyer to left. This decision would eventually backfire for the Indians. Shaw retired Baez on a failed squeeze bunt with two strikes—another decision by Maddon which drew criticism—and fouled it off for the second out. Dexter Fowler would eventually ground out on a spectacular game-saving play by shortstop Francisco Lindor to end the top of the ninth. To the shock of many observers, Aroldis Chapman was asked by Maddon to return to the mound for the bottom of the ninth. Despite his exhaustion, he promptly retired the Indians in order, facing Carlos Santana, Jason Kipnis, and Francisco Lindor.

With the game tied 6–6 after nine innings, a sudden cloudburst resulted in a 17-minute rain delay. During the delay, Cubs right fielder Heyward called his teammates into a weight room behind Chicago's dugout and told them, "We're the best team in baseball ... for a reason... Stick together and we're going to win this game." After the game, many of Heyward's teammates credited him with renewing their spirits.

When play resumed in the top of the tenth, Kyle Schwarber promptly led off with a single off Indians pitcher Shaw, who was not relieved during the rain delay. Maddon replaced Schwarber with pinch-runner Albert Almora. Kris Bryant then hit a deep fly ball to center, and Almora tagged up and advanced to second base in what was called the "savviest baserunning play of the season." After an intentional walk to Anthony Rizzo, Ben Zobrist stepped up to the plate. Zobrist had been 0-for-4 in the game, but he delivered a clutch RBI double into the left field corner, scoring Almora and breaking the tie, making the score 7–6. Zobrist later said, "I was just battling, grinding up there. Fortunately, that last one he left over the plate and up to where I could just slap it down the line, and that was all I was trying to do."

After another intentional walk to Addison Russell to re-load the bases, Miguel Montero, who had replaced Ross at catcher and was hitting just .091 in the postseason, delivered another clutch single into left, scoring Rizzo and making the score 8–6. Trevor Bauer, the losing pitcher of Games 2 and 5, relieved Shaw and got out of the bases-loaded jam by striking out Heyward and retiring Baez on a flyout to escape further damage.

Carl Edwards Jr. was called on to finish off the Indians in the bottom of the tenth, but after retiring the first two hitters (Mike Napoli and José Ramírez), he walked Brandon Guyer, who took second base on defensive indifference. Rajai Davis, following up on his eighth-inning home run, lined a single to center, making it a one-run game, and the score 8–7. Maddon then called on midseason trade acquisition Mike Montgomery, who had zero career saves. Montgomery retired Michael Martinez (the replacement for Crisp who had scored the game-winning run in Game 3 but had struck out in his only two at-bats of the Series and a career .194 batting average) with an infield grounder fielded by Bryant, who threw to Rizzo. This ended the game and the World Series, with the Cubs winning the series and ending their 108-year World Series championship drought. Zobrist was awarded the World Series MVP award after hitting .357 in the series and delivering the go-ahead hit. This was the first Game 7 won by the Cubs in franchise history, having previously lost in their last two seventh game appearances, in the 1945 World Series and the NLCS in 2003.

==== After Game 7 ====
Rizzo called the rain delay "the most important thing to happen to the Chicago Cubs in the past 100 years. I don't think there's any way we win the game without it." Cubs president Theo Epstein said that when he heard about the meeting called by Heyward, "Right then I thought, 'We're winning this game.'"

The Cubs became the first team to come back from a 3–1 deficit to win the Series since the 1985 Kansas City Royals. They were also the first since the 1979 Pittsburgh Pirates to do so while winning Games 6 and 7 on the road, and the second team since the 1979 Pirates to win Game 7 as the visiting team, with the 2014 San Francisco Giants also having achieved that feat in Kansas City. With the Game 7 victory, Joe Maddon is 3–0 in postseason series against Terry Francona, having also won the 2008 ALCS and the 2013 Wild Card Game against him. Game 7 was the 60th extra inning game in World Series history, and the fifth time a Game 7 went into extra innings (no World Series would go to extra innings in Game 7 until 2025). This was the first extra inning Game 7 to be won by the visiting team, as the home team won the previous four times in 1912, 1924, 1991, and 1997.

With the Cubs winning, the Indians (now Guardians) became the owners of MLB's longest active championship drought. The most recent World Series title for the Indians/Guardians came in October 1948—a drought of 68 years as of October 2016 and now 78 years ago. Earlier in 2016, the Cleveland sports curse had been broken, with the Cleveland Cavaliers winning the city's first major sports championship since 1964 by defeating the Golden State Warriors in the 2016 NBA Finals, also with a 3–1 series deficit comeback.

Game 7 of the 2016 World Series was nominated for the Best Game award at the 2017 ESPY Awards, but that honor went to Super Bowl LI instead.

This marked the last World Series in which the visiting team's championship presentation took place in the clubhouse instead of the playing field. Following the 2017 World Series, every World Series presentation has taken place on the field, regardless of whether the home or road team won the championship.

Cubs players celebrating on the field moments after winning Game 7 and the World Series.

=== Composite line score ===
2016 World Series (4–3): Chicago Cubs (NL) beat Cleveland Indians (AL).

Team	1	2	3	4	5	6	7	8	9	10	R	H	E
Chicago Cubs	6	0	5	5	5	1	0	1	2	2	27	61	5
Cleveland Indians	2	3	2	2	3	3	4	6	1	1	27	55	6
Home runs: CHC: Kris Bryant (2), Dexter Fowler (2), Javier Baez (1), Anthony Rizzo (1), David Ross (1), Addison Russell (1); CLE: Jason Kipnis (2), Roberto Pérez (2), Rajai Davis (1), José Ramírez (1), Carlos Santana (1); Total attendance: 277,603 Average attendance: 39,658; Winning player's share: $368,871.59 Losing player's share: $261,804.65

== Broadcasting ==
=== Television ===
Fox televised the series in the United States, under contract with Major League Baseball giving it exclusive rights to the World Series through 2021. Joe Buck was the network's play-by-play announcer, with John Smoltz as color commentator and Ken Rosenthal and Tom Verducci as field reporters. Fox Deportes also aired the Series and provided a Spanish-language simulcast over-the-air via Fox's SAP audio, with Carlos Álvarez and Duaner Sánchez announcing.

Sportsnet in English and RDS in French televised the series in Canada. Sportsnet used the MLB International feed produced by the MLB Network; Matt Vasgersian was MLB International's play-by-play announcer with the Toronto Blue Jays' play-by-play announcer Buck Martinez as their color analyst and MLB Network correspondent Lauren Shehadi and analyst Mark DeRosa as field reporters. Alain Usereau and former Montreal Expos player Marc Griffin handled the French-language telecast for RDS. BT Sport televised the series live in the United Kingdom and Ireland. WAPA-TV transmitted the series to Puerto Rico, with Rafael Bracero at the helm of the station's sports commentary of the series.

==== Ratings ====
Initial reports often utilize "fast national" ratings, which are subject to revision. Game 7 had over 40 million viewers, the largest audience for a baseball game since Game 7 of the 1991 World Series, while the series as a whole was the first to average double-digit ratings nationally since 2009.

Game	Ratings (households)	Share (households)	U.S. audience (in millions)	Ref
1	11.3	20	19.37	
2	10.2	18	17.40	
3	11.0	20	19.38	
4	9.3	18	16.71	
5	13.1	21	23.64	
6	13.3	23	23.40	
7	21.8	37	40.05	

=== Radio ===
Cubs fans celebrating in Wrigleyville.

ESPN Radio's national network covered the World Series through affiliated stations, with Dan Shulman providing the play-by-play and Aaron Boone serving as color analyst. Tampa Bay Rays pitcher Chris Archer appeared as a guest analyst for select innings of Games 1 and 2.

Locally, the teams' flagship stations broadcast the series with their regular announcers. In Cleveland, WTAM (1100) and WMMS (100.7) carried the Indians' play-by-play with Tom Hamilton and Jim Rosenhaus, while in Chicago, WSCR (670) carried the Cubs' play-by-play with Pat Hughes, Ron Coomer, and Len Kasper. The affiliate stations of the teams' regional radio networks were contractually obligated to carry the national ESPN Radio feed; even so, since both WSCR and WTAM are clear-channel stations, most of the eastern and midwestern United States was able to hear the local broadcasts.

== Celebration ==
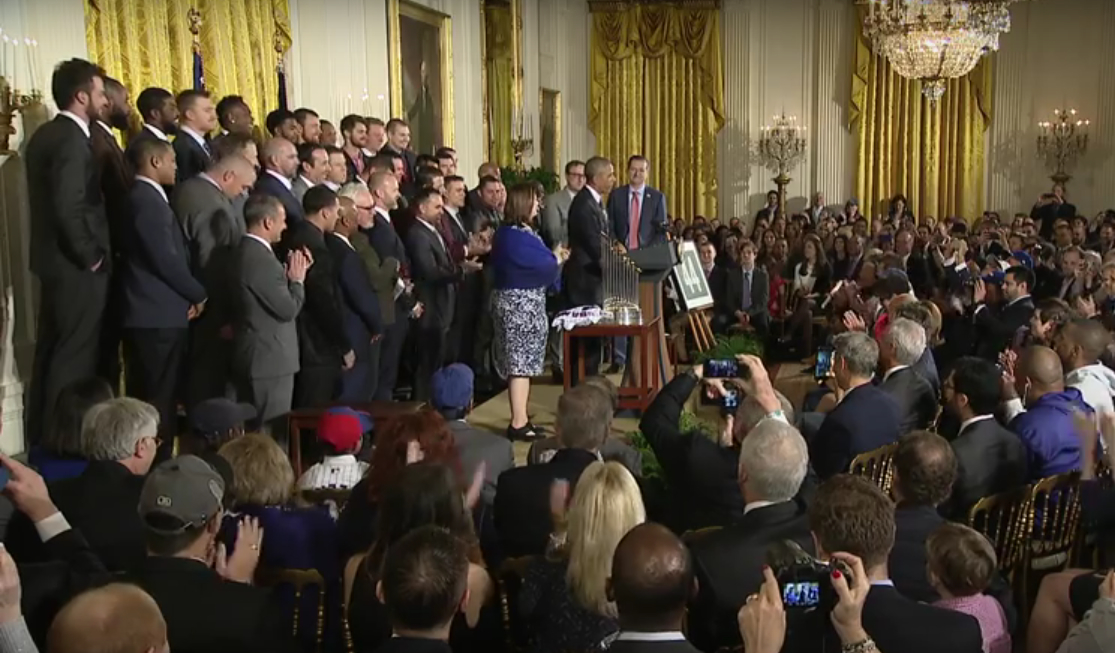
The Chicago Cubs posing with President Barack Obama in the East Room during their January 2017 visit to the White House

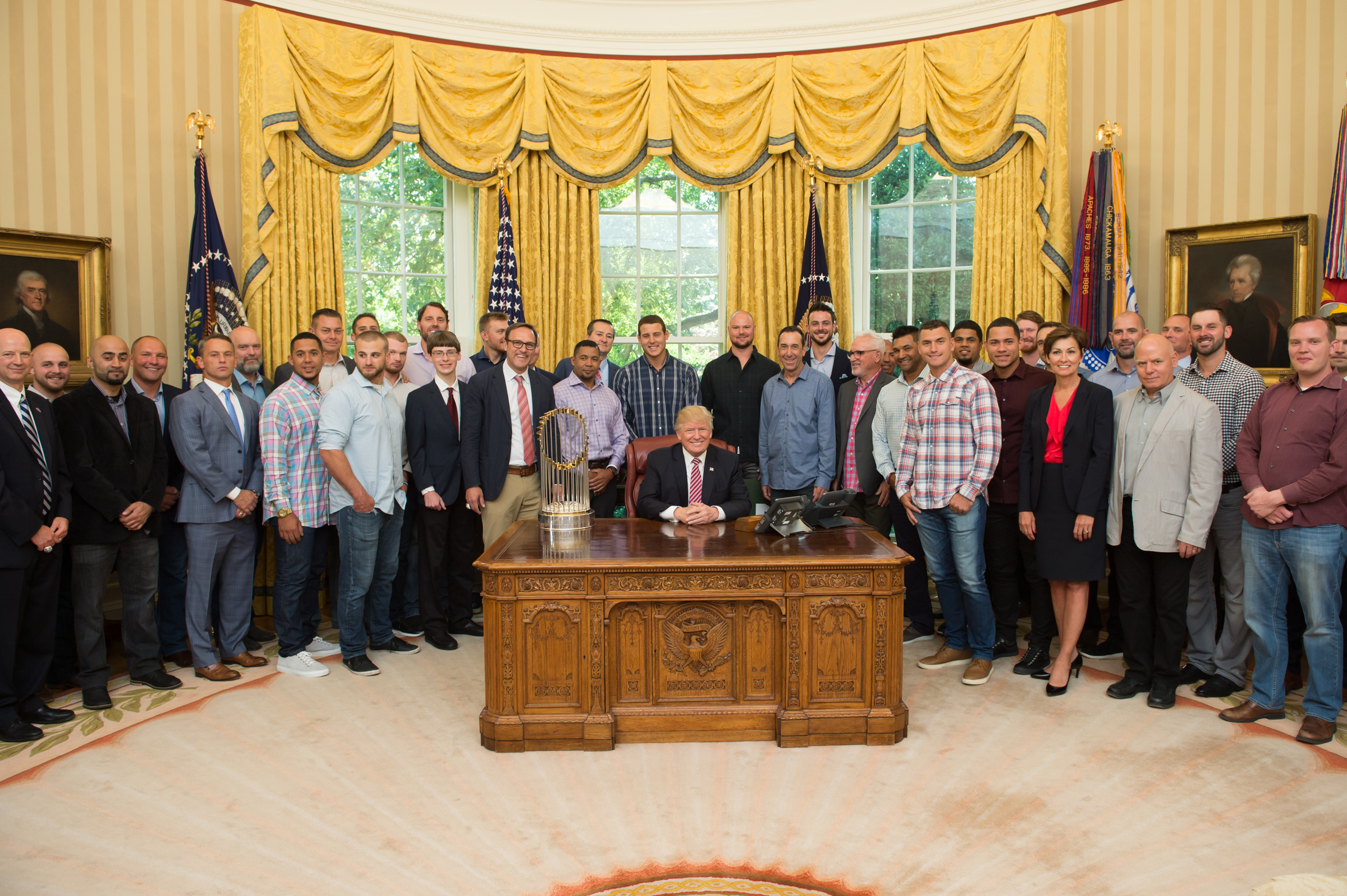
The Chicago Cubs posing with President Donald Trump in the Oval Office during their June 2017 visit to the White House

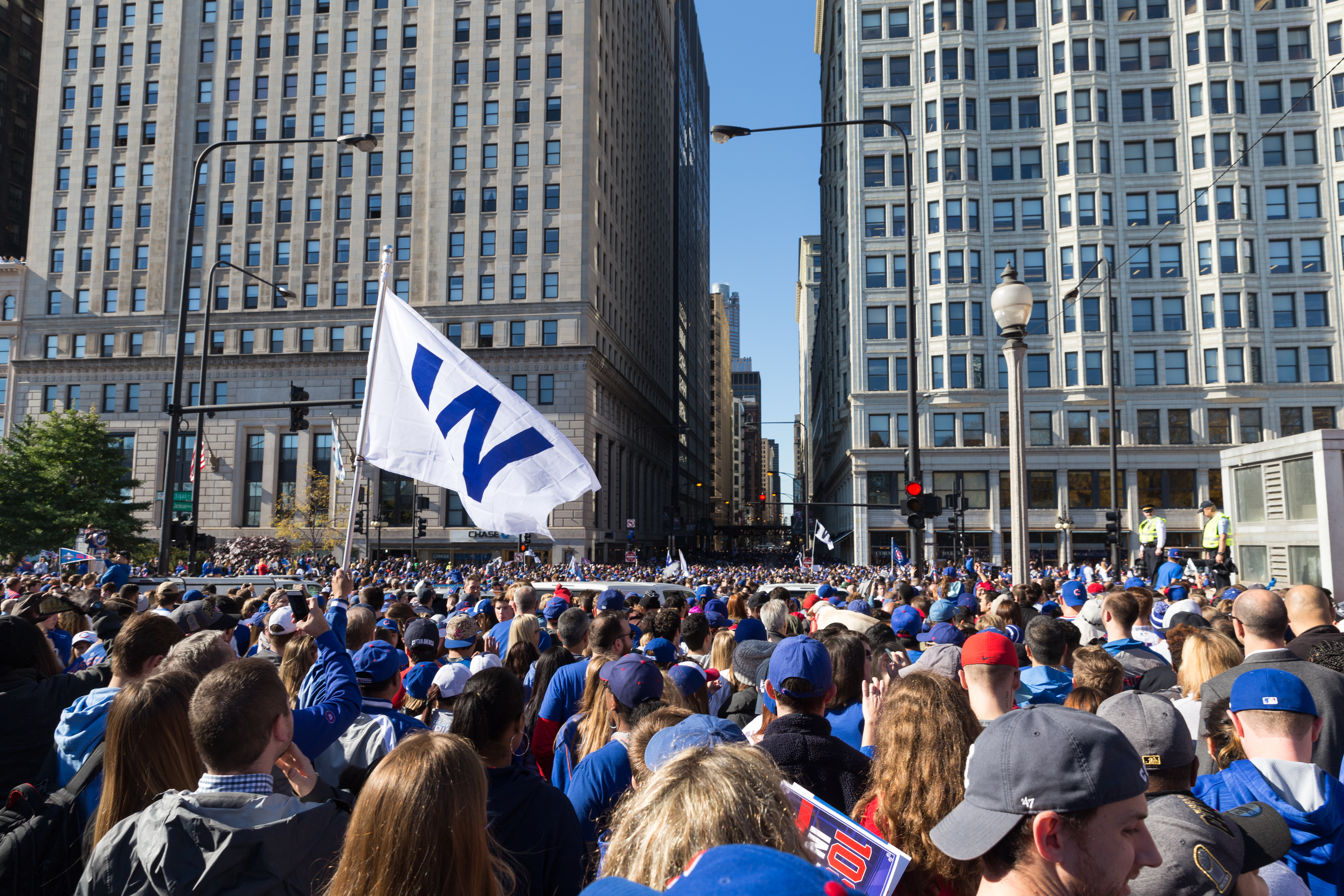
Victory parade (November 4, 2016)

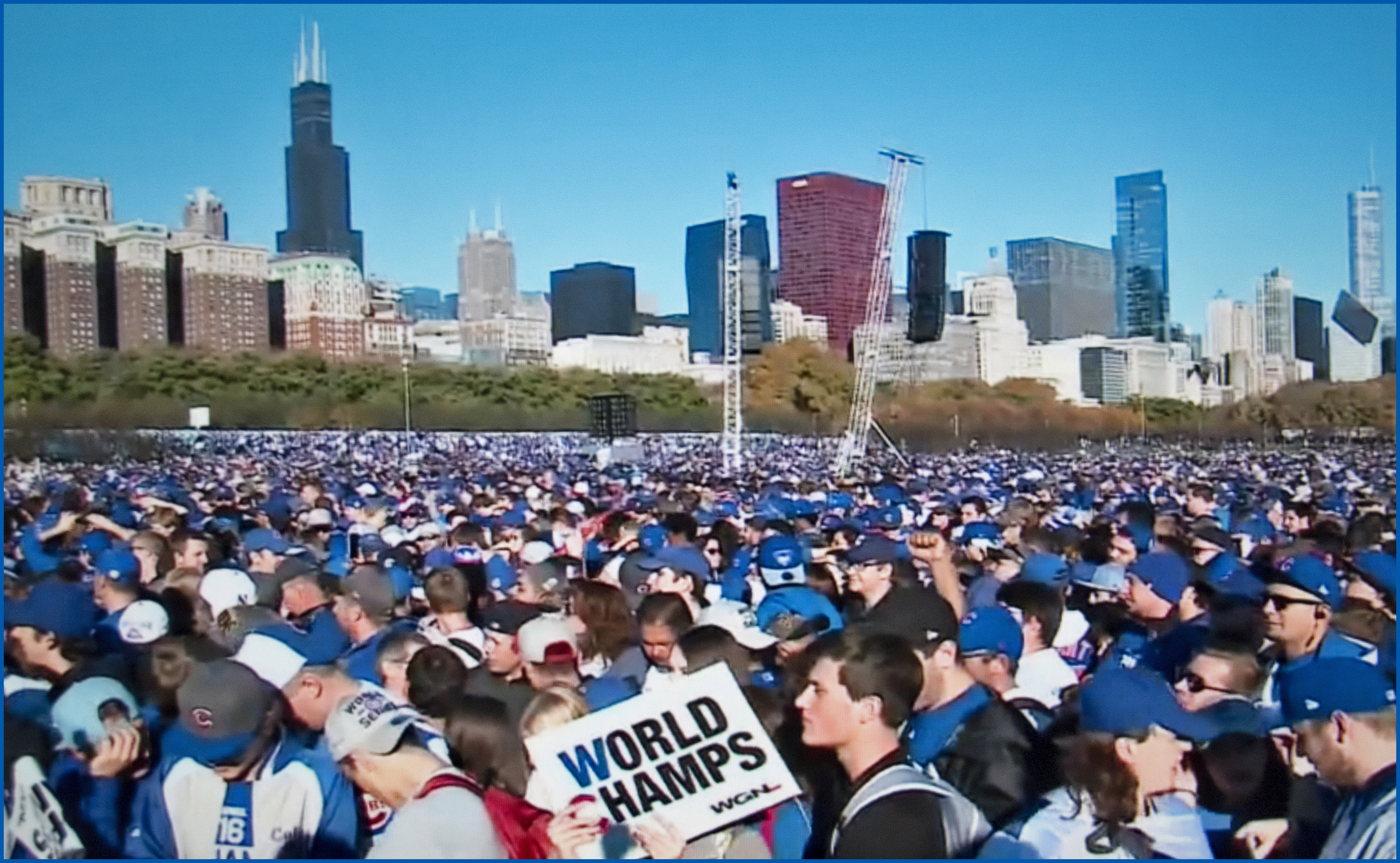
Victory rally in Grant Park (November 4, 2016)

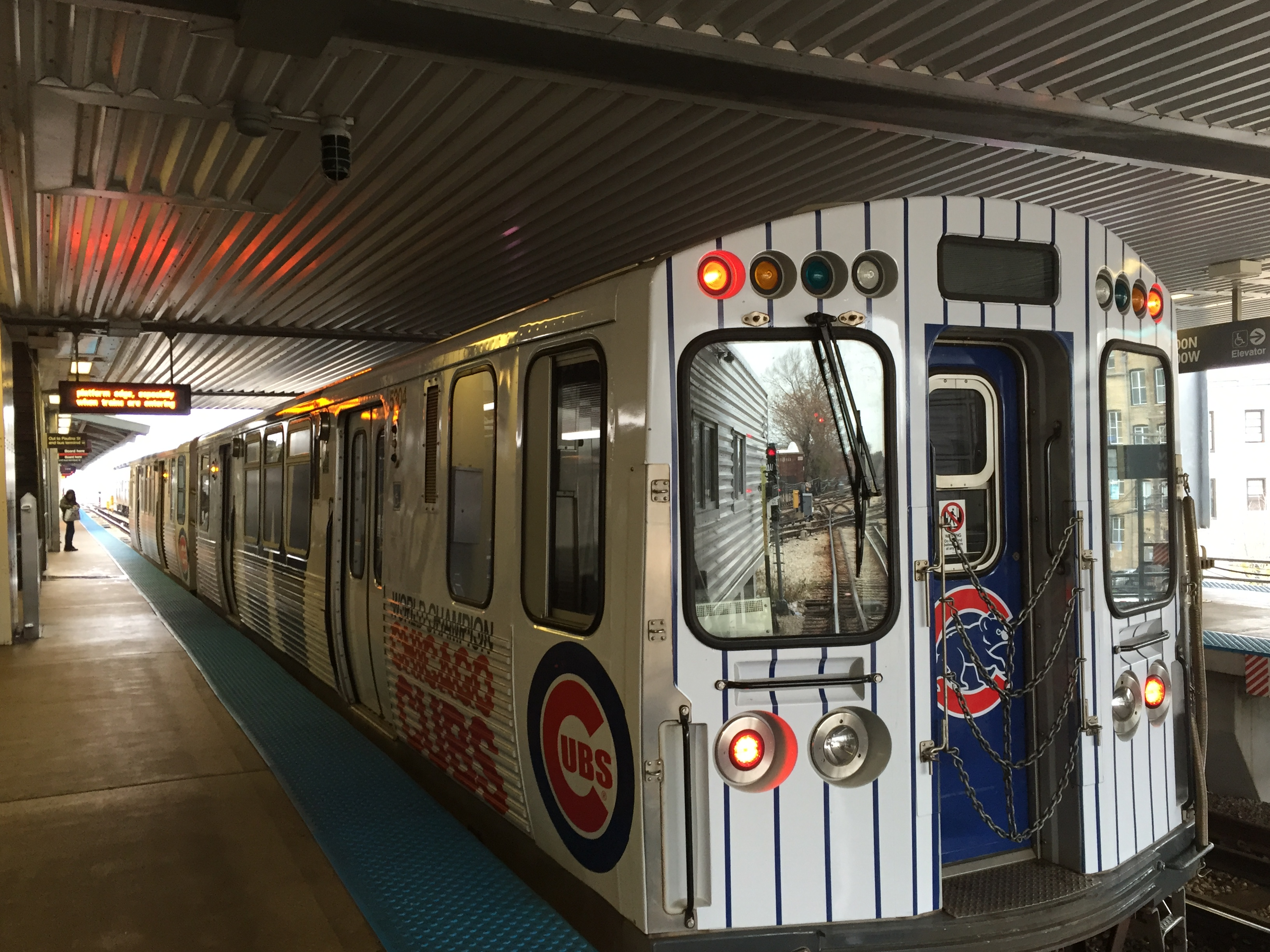
"L" train of the CTA with special livery celebrating the victory

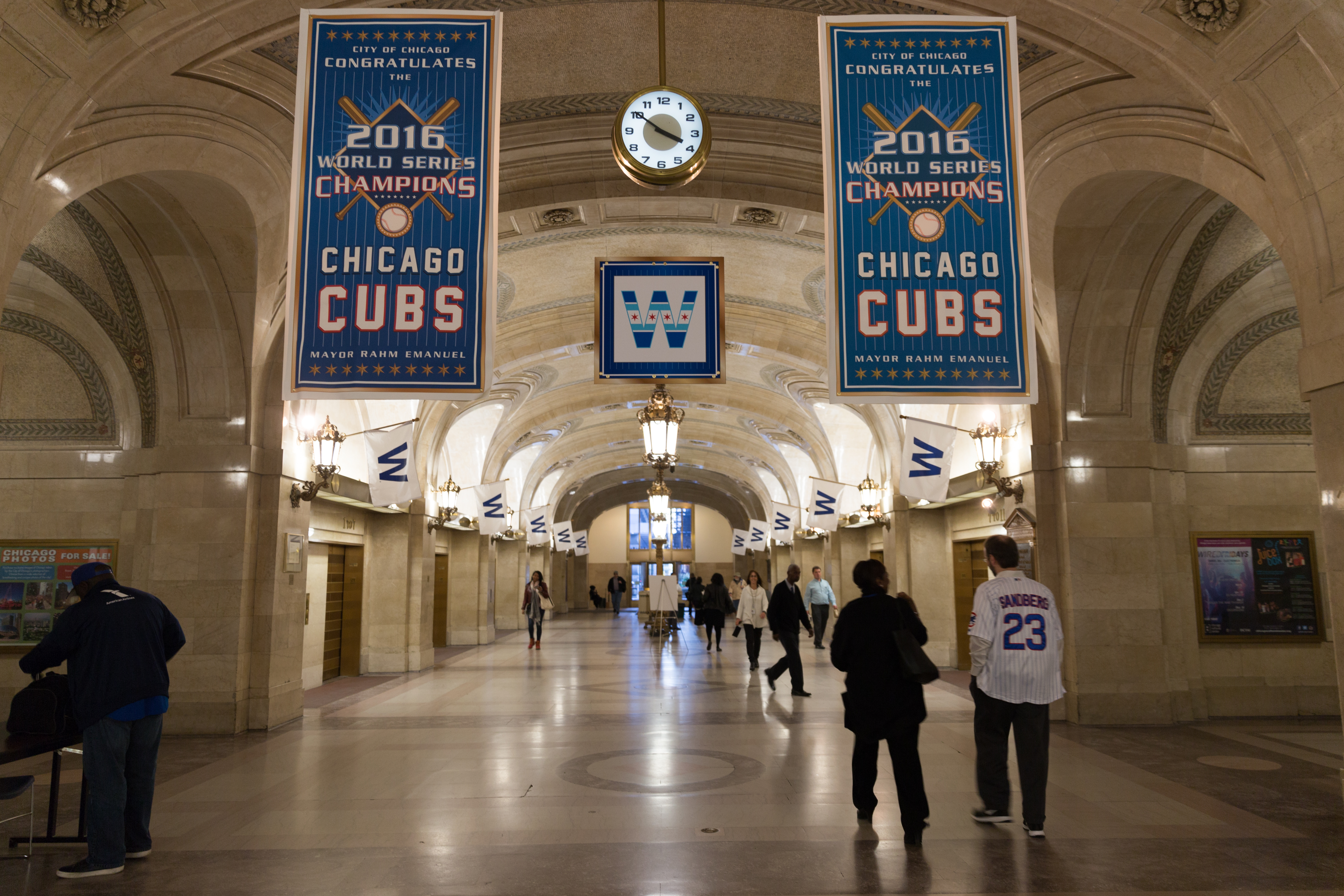
Lobby of Chicago City Hall decorated in celebration of the Cubs victory

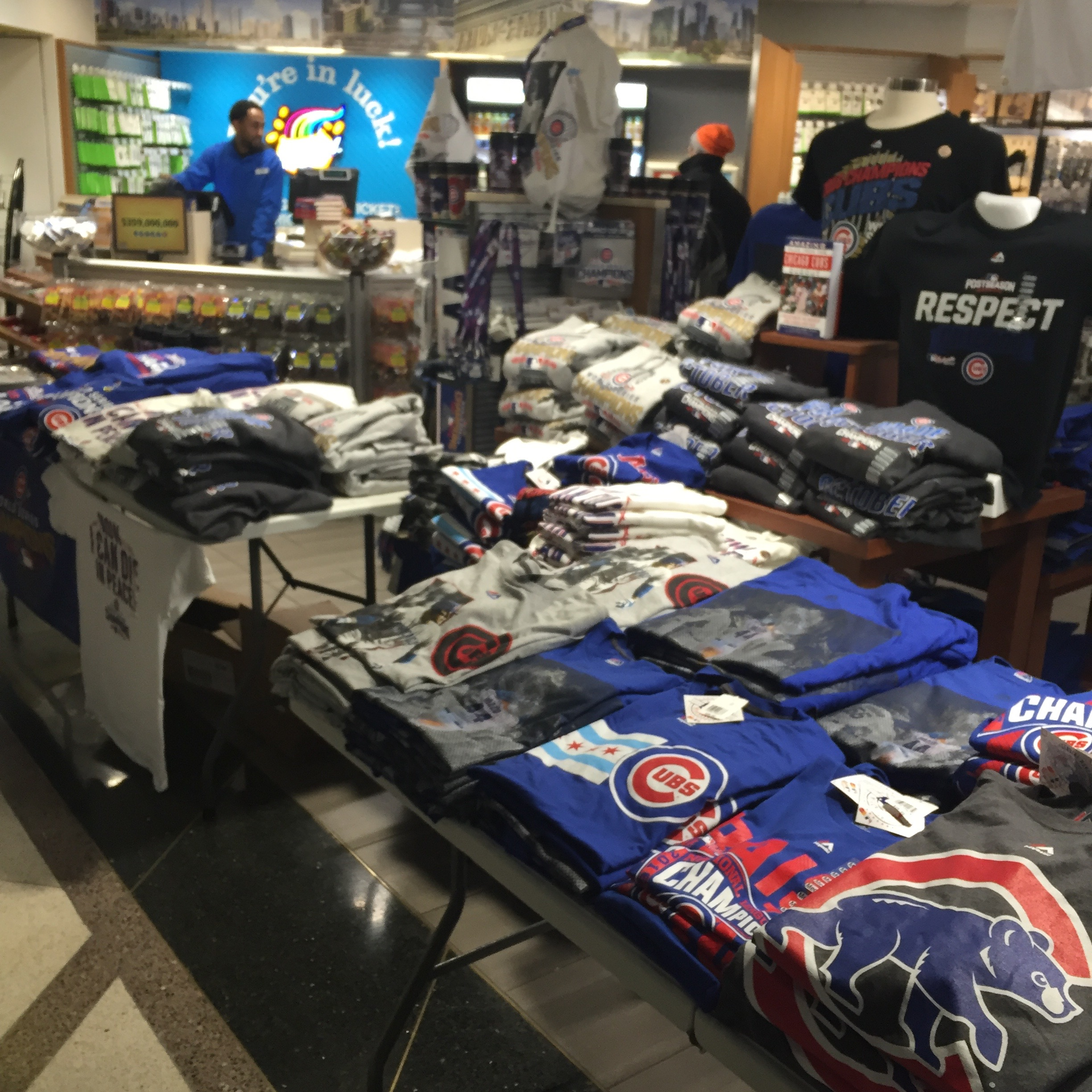
Cubs and World Series merchandise being sold at Chicago Union station several weeks after the end of the series

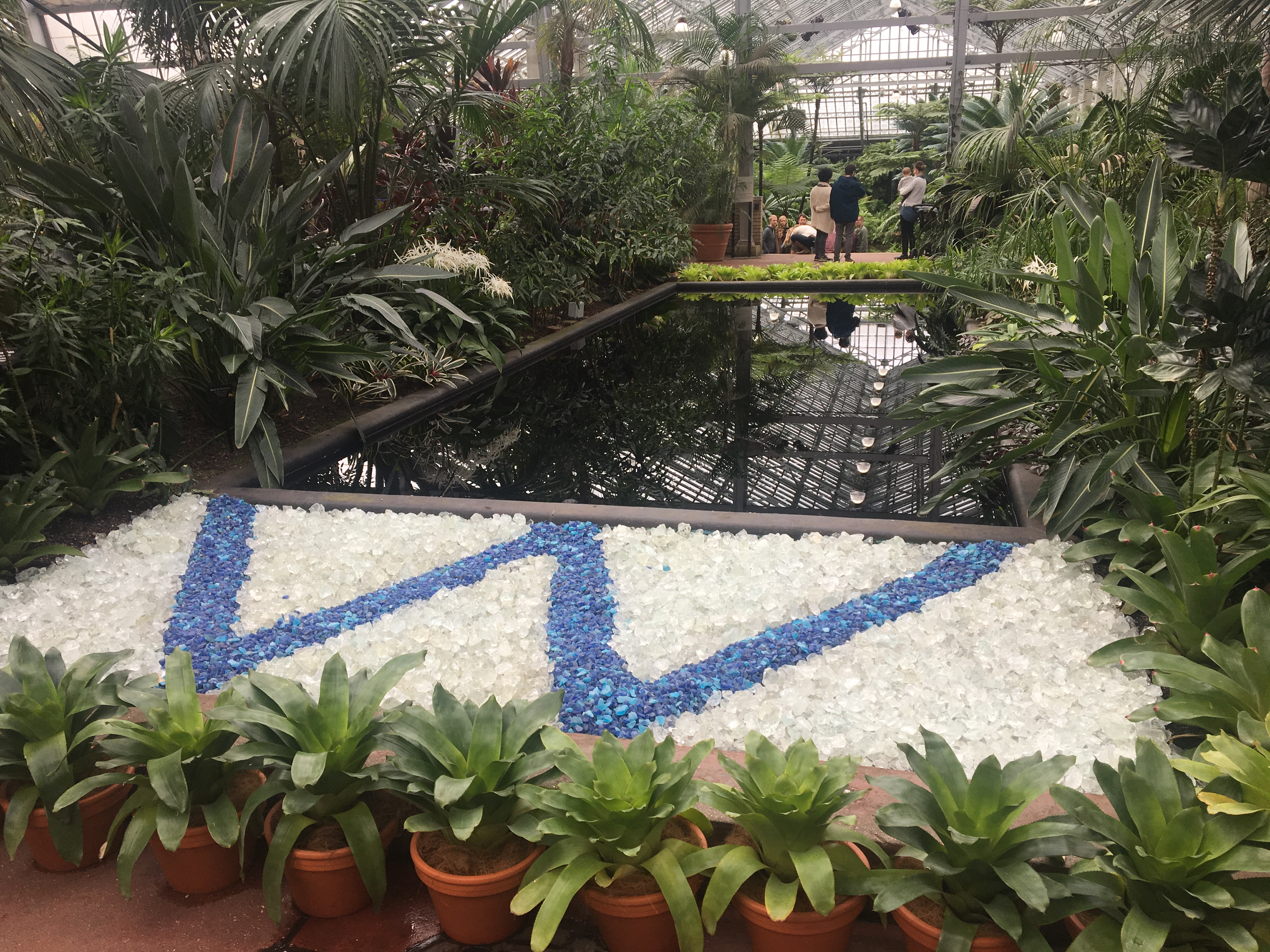
Flower bed at Chicago's Garfield Park Conservatory grown in the pattern of the Cubs Win Flag

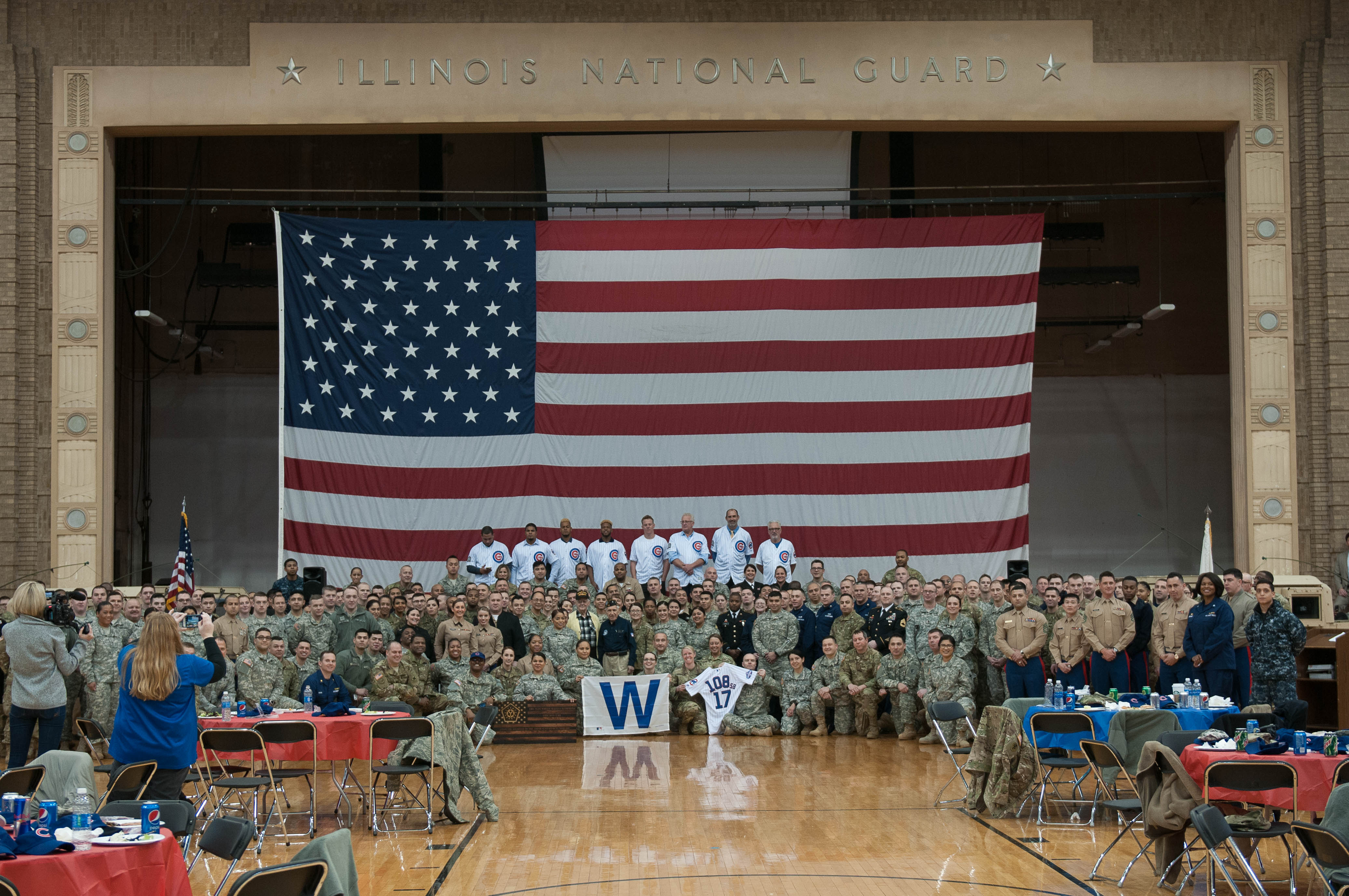
Members of the Cubs celebrate in January 2017 with the 108th Sustainment Brigade of the Illinois National Guard

Following the team's win in Game 7, Cubs fans congregated outside of Wrigley Field and the surrounding Wrigleyville neighborhood to celebrate the championship. On November 4, the team's victory parade began at Wrigley Field and headed down Lake Shore Drive and Michigan Avenue at downtown for a noon rally at Grant Park. Country singer Brett Eldredge sang a cover of "Go, Cubs, Go" during the rally. The city of Chicago estimated that over five million people attended the World Series parade and rally celebration, making it one of the largest gatherings in history, and according to some sources, the largest gathering in the history of the United States. (Note: If verified, the parade crowd would have surpassed the crowd size during the April 1951 visit of General Douglas MacArthur to New York City after being relieved of duty by President Harry S. Truman.) After the season, the Cubs chose to make two traditional White House visits during then-President (and White Sox fan) Barack Obama's final week in office on January 16, 2017, and during President Donald Trump's tenure on June 28, 2017.

== Prior pop culture portrayals of drought-breaking Cubs World Series victories ==
In the decades prior to the 2016 World Series, the prospect of the Cubs eventually breaking their World Series victory drought appeared in pop culture.

=== Back to the Future portrayal of a 2015 victory ===
In the 1989 film Back to the Future Part II, the Chicago Cubs are depicted as the 2015 World Series champions, defeating a fictional American League team from Miami, whose mascot is an alligator, in a sweep. A newspaper shown during the film states that the sweep took five games, implying that the World Series had become a best-of-nine series at some point prior to 2015. The team now known as the Miami Marlins was not formed until four years later, with a billfish as a mascot. Screenwriter Bob Gale, who co-wrote the script of Back to the Future Part II, originally intended it as a joke, saying "Being a baseball fan, I thought, 'OK, let's come up with one of the most unlikely scenarios we can think of", referencing both the Cubs' long championship drought and the fact that Florida did not have a baseball team in 1989. He also explained that the October 21 prediction was based on the postseason structure at the time of the writing of the film, and thus could have been accurate had MLB not added the Division Series in 1994 and Wild Card Game in 2012.

The film's prediction of the Cubs winning the World Series proved to be incorrect by one year, although it did pick the correct date on which the Cubs' 2015 season ended, when they lost to the New York Mets in a four-game sweep of the NLCS. The official Back to the Future Twitter account acknowledged this following the Cubs' win in 2016 by tweeting "Way to go Cubbies" and posting a still image from the film stating the same, and a follow-up tweet that said the 1994 players' strike, in which that year's World Series was canceled, caused a "disruption in the space-time continuum". Following the Cubs win, Michael J. Fox, star of the movie, reacted to the Cubs' win by tweeting "Only off by a year, not bad" and a congratulatory message to the Cubs organization.

=== Parks and Recreation portrayal of a 2016 victory ===
The episode "Ron and Jammy" in the seventh season of the sitcom Parks and Recreation (broadcast in early 2015) portrays the Cubs as having won the 2016 World Series, with a line in that episode mentioning such a victory. Michael Schur (co-creator of the show) took credit for this line. After the World Series, he recalled the prediction as having been informed by observations that promising talent in the Cubs' Minor League Baseball farm system put the team in a position to be competitive in 2016 despite having had a poor 2014 season. In an interview following the World Series, Schur remarked,

It’s not like I was only person who thought the Cubs were going to be good. [In 2014], every baseball writer in America knew the Cubs were going to be good [in 2016]. I can’t emphasize enough how little credit I feel like I should take for that prediction.

== Aftermath ==
This was the last World Series to have home-field advantage determined by the league winner of the All-Star Game. Since 2017, home-field advantage has been determined by best regular-season record.

In February 2024, MLB Network aired a special live commentary of Game 7 with managers Joe Maddon and Terry Francona, and with Bob Costas and Tom Verducci moderating. Later that year, Amazon Prime spotlighted the 2016 World Series in their documentary series 'Game 7'.

=== Cubs ===
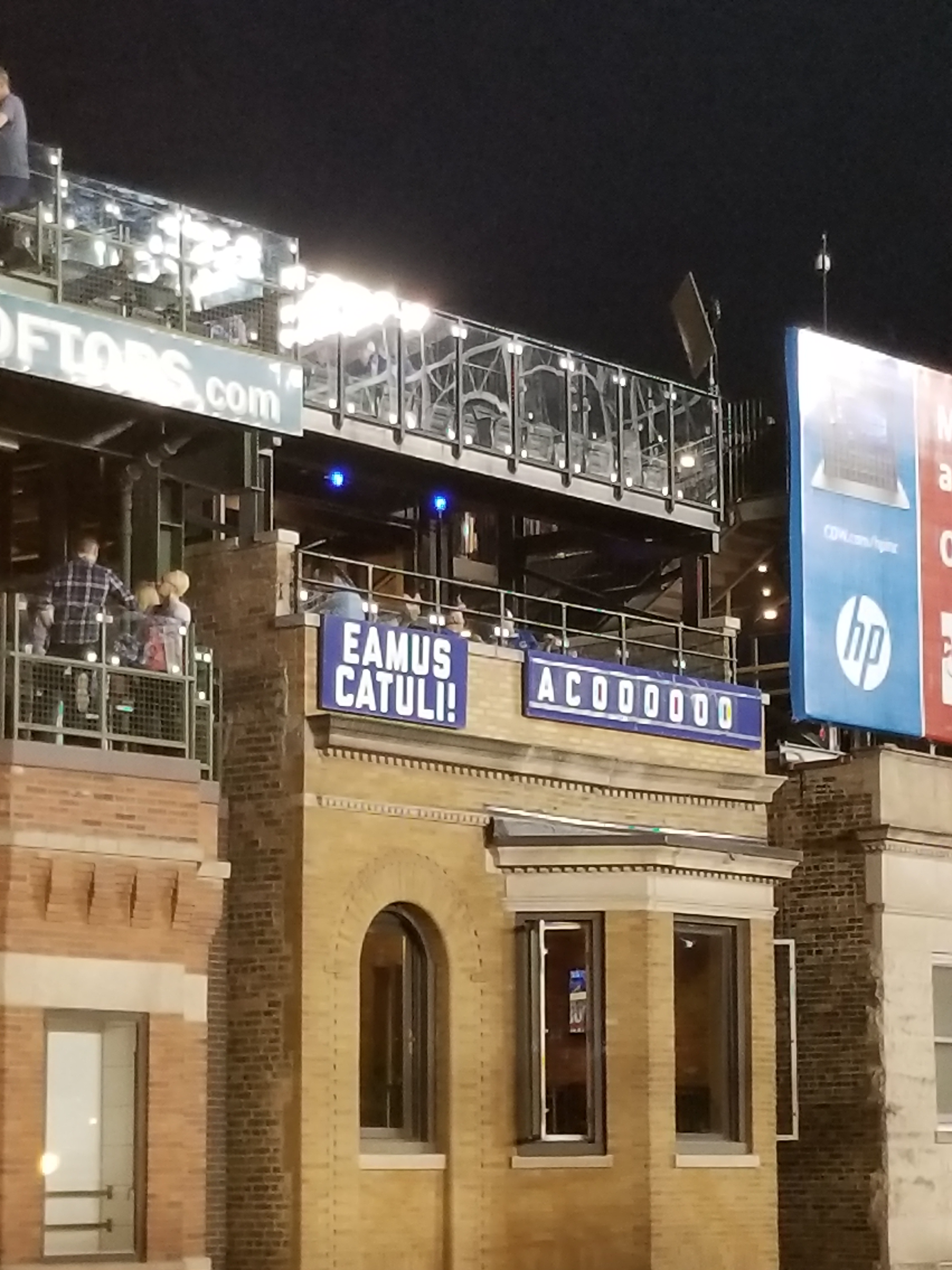
Eamus Catuli sign at "AC0000000" during the 2017 Chicago Cubs season, in recognition of the Cubs victory the previous season

While the 2015–2020 Cubs had the greatest sustained run of success since the dead-ball era, the Cubs only reached one World Series during those six seasons. The 2017 Cubs returned to the NLCS, but lost to the Los Angeles Dodgers in five games. In 2018, the Cubs finished tied with the Milwaukee Brewers for the division, but lost the tie-breaker game and were relegated to the 2018 NL Wild Card Game against the Colorado Rockies, which the Cubs also lost. They failed to qualify in the postseason in 2019 and were upset by the Miami Marlins in 2020. The Cubs appeared set to return to the postseason in 2023, but they lost five of their last six games and lost the last wild card spot to the Marlins by one game, despite having their first winning record since 2020. They did not return to the postseason until the 2025 season.

In addition, the Cubs' 2016 championship core slowly moved on over the course of the next few years:

- Dexter Fowler signed with the rival St. Louis Cardinals during the 2016–17 off-season.
- In the same off-season, Aroldis Chapman returned to the New York Yankees by signing the largest contract ever for a relief pitcher.
- At the 2016 Winter Meetings, Jorge Soler and Travis Wood were traded to the Kansas City Royals for All-Star closer Wade Davis, effectively replacing Chapman. Mike Montgomery, the man who recorded the last out of the World Series, was also traded to Kansas City in 2019.
- Game 7 was also the last game for fan favorite David Ross, who retired. After the 2019 season, Ross replaced Joe Maddon as Cubs manager after Maddon mutually parted ways with the club after five seasons in Chicago.
- Miguel Montero was traded to the Toronto Blue Jays during the 2017 season, due to the emergence of Willson Contreras and a dispute about playing time.
- The 2017 season turned out to be John Lackey's last season, as he retired. In the 2017–18 offseason, Jake Arrieta signed a free-agent contact with the Philadelphia Phillies, though Arrieta would later return to the team in 2021.
- After a serious abuse allegation made by his ex-wife, Addison Russell's career came to an abrupt end after he was non-tendered by the Cubs following the 2019 season. Additionally, World Series MVP Ben Zobrist retired after 2019 after his own marital problems as well.
- Theo Epstein announced that he would step down from his role with the Cubs as President of Baseball Operations, effective November 20, 2020. He was replaced in his position by general manager Jed Hoyer and the Cubs hired Carter Hawkins as their new general manager. A few weeks later, the Cubs non-tendered Kyle Schwarber in a controversial move to cut cost. Later in the off-season, Schwarber and Jon Lester signed one-year free agent contracts with the Washington Nationals. The move to cut Schwarber proved to be ill-advised, as he became one of the premier power hitters of the decade.

By the 2021 trade deadline, the Cubs had fully committed to a re-build, as established players such as Anthony Rizzo, Kris Bryant, and Javier Baez were traded away for young players and prospects. Rizzo would be traded to the Yankees, Bryant went to the Giants, and Baez went to the Mets. Many fans and media drew a comparison with the 2016 Cubs to the 1986 New York Mets, as both teams had a young core when they won a World Series, both had staged thrilling comebacks to win their respective World Series in seven games, and both seemed to have further potential that ended up not materializing. Following the departure of Kyle Hendricks after the 2024 season, no players remained from the Cubs' 2016 World Series team.

=== Indians ===
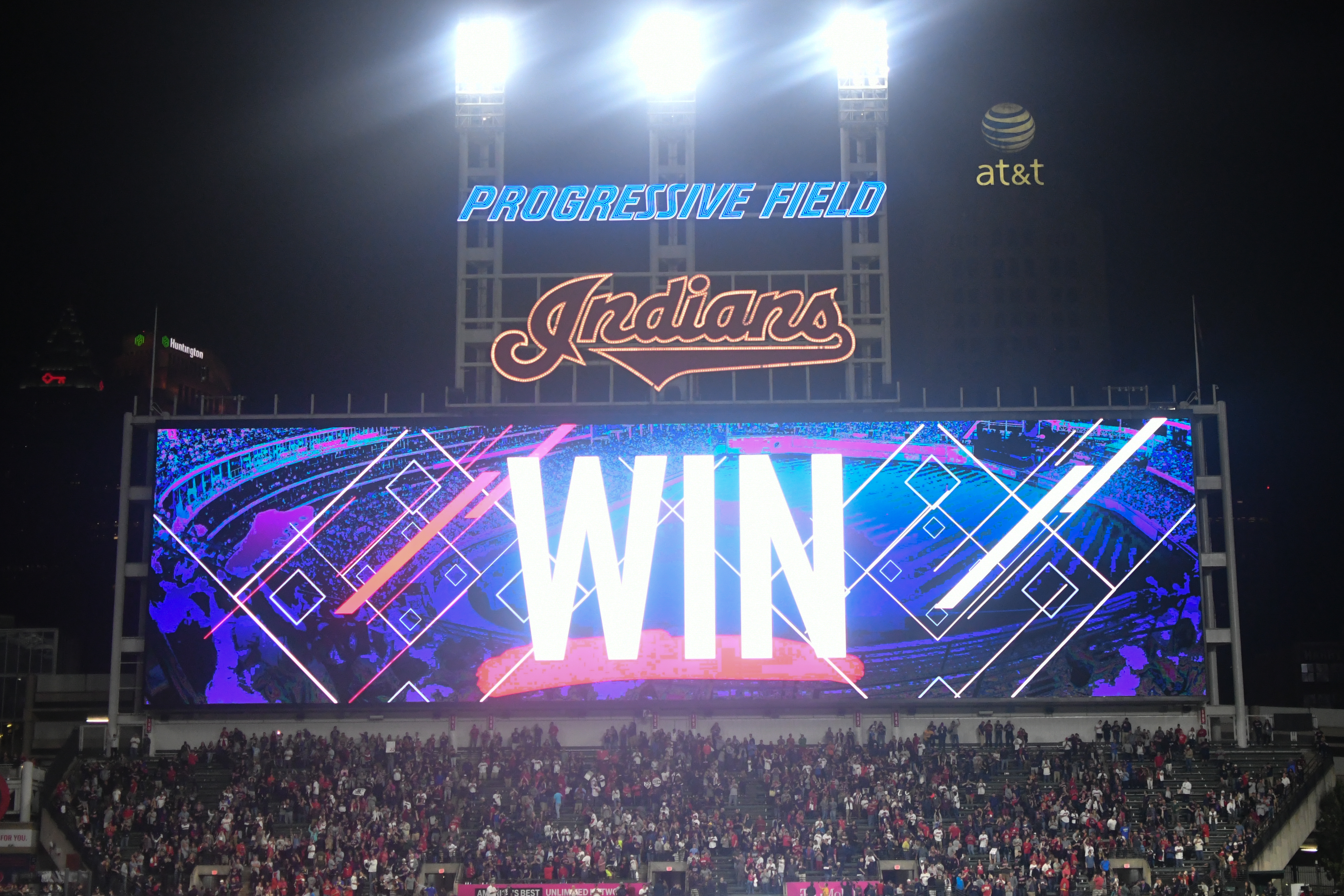
Cleveland Indians' 22nd consecutive win in 2017, just four shy of the MLB record

2016 was also the high point for the Indians. The 2017 Indians won 22 straight games—the second-longest winning streak in major-league history—on their way to a 102–60 record and AL Central title. During their 22-game win streak, they were nicknamed "WIndians" by fans and media. However, their near record winning streak did not translate into postseason success, as they lost to the New York Yankees in five games in the ALDS after taking a 2–0 series lead. The Indians won their division again in 2018, but were swept by the Houston Astros in the ALDS.

During the 2020–21 off-season, the Indians traded star shortstop Francisco Lindor, along with longtime rotation stalwart Carlos Carrasco, to the New York Mets. The final player from Cleveland's 2016 roster to remain with the team had been José Ramírez.

This was the team's final World Series appearance with the Indians nickname, as they changed their nickname to Guardians in 2022.

After the loss, the Indians became the team with the longest World Series title drought as well as the second longest championship drought in North American sports, which stood at 68 years, and is now 78 years. The only team of the four major North American leagues to have a longer championship drought is the National Football League's Arizona Cardinals, who won their last championship in 1947, as the Chicago Cardinals.

== In popular culture ==
The final game of the World Series is a plot point in the fourth episode of the second season of the sitcom Not Dead Yet (aired in 2024).

== See also ==
- List of World Series champions
- Curse of Rocky Colavito
- Curse of the Billy Goat
- 2016 Japan Series
- 2016 Korean Series
- Golden pitch
