= 2016 Cleveland Indians season =

Major League Baseball season

2016 Cleveland Indians
- American League champions American League Central champions
- League: American League
- Division: Central
- Ballpark: Progressive Field
- City: Cleveland, Ohio
- Record: 94–67 (.584)
- Divisional place: 1st
- Owners: Larry Dolan; Paul Dolan
- President of baseball operations: Chris Antonetti
- General managers: Mike Chernoff
- Managers: Terry Francona
- Television: SportsTime Ohio · WKYC (Matt Underwood, Rick Manning)
- Radio: WTAM · WMMS; Cleveland Indians Radio Network (Tom Hamilton, Jim Rosenhaus)

The 2016 Cleveland Indians season was the 116th season of the Cleveland Indians franchise and the 23rd season at Progressive Field. The Indians won the American League Central for the first time since 2007 and also beat the Boston Red Sox in the ALDS for their first playoff win in nine years. They defeated the Toronto Blue Jays in five games in the ALCS before losing to the Chicago Cubs in seven games in the World Series, despite holding a 3–1 series lead. This was their first appearance in the World Series since 1997.

== Regular season ==
=== Opening day starting lineup ===
Tuesday, April 5, 2016, vs Boston Red Sox

Name	Pos.
Rajai Davis	CF
Jason Kipnis	2B
Francisco Lindor	SS
Mike Napoli	1B
Carlos Santana	DH
Yan Gomes	C
Marlon Byrd	LF
Juan Uribe	3B
Collin Cowgill	RF

Starting Pitcher: Corey Kluber

=== April ===
The Cleveland Indians opened up their 2016 season with a three-game series against the Boston Red Sox at Progressive Field. Opening Day was scheduled for April 4, but was postponed due to a mixture of rain and snow until April 5. The Indians lost the opener 6–2. They would get their first win a day later, as newly acquired 1B Mike Napoli hit the go-ahead home run in a 7–6 victory over his former team.

The Indians struggled during the month of April, going just 10-11 during the month. On April 24, SP Carlos Carrasco left a game with a hamstring injury. He would miss the next six weeks. Trevor Bauer, who started the year in the bullpen, would take Carrasco's spot in the rotation. SP Josh Tomlin was a bright spot for April, as he went 3-0 throughout the month.

=== May ===
Outfielder Michael Brantley came back from a shoulder injury he suffered late in 2015. He would only play 11 games before re-aggravating his shoulder. He would not return the rest of the season. The Indians won 12 of 17 games between May 2–20, to close to within two games of the division leading Chicago White Sox. The Indians would take three of four in Chicago later in the month to take the division lead. The team finished the month 16–3.

=== June ===
The Indians continued their success into June, as they would win their first six games of the month. Later in the month, the Indians would win a franchise record 14 straight games from June 17 through July 1. The Indians were a perfect 11–0 at home in June. They spent the month battling with the Detroit Tigers, Kansas City Royals, and fading Chicago White Sox atop the AL Central. The Indians finished the month two games ahead of Kansas City.

SP Danny Salazar, who went 5–0 with a 1.91 ERA and a .177 opponent's batting average, was named the American League Pitcher of the Month for June. OF Tyler Naquin was named the AL Rookie of the Month after batting .338 with an AL-best 1.219 OPS.

=== July ===
The Indians won their game on July 1, 2–1 over the Toronto Blue Jays, in 19 innings - the longest game of the 2016 season - to extend their winning streak to 14 games, but it would end the next day with a 9–6 loss to the Blue Jays. The Indians would maintain a 5–7 game lead over the Detroit Tigers throughout much of July. However the team struggled near the end of the month and the lead slipped down to 4 games. Adding to the struggle was an injury to C Yan Gomes, who would not return until the final game of the season.

On July 5, SP Danny Salazar and SS Francisco Lindor were named to the All Star team. On July 8, SP Corey Kluber was also named to the team as an injury replacement. OF Tyler Naquin was named the AL Rookie of the Month for the second straight month.

The Indians were active at the trade deadline. On July 31, they acquired RP Andrew Miller from the New York Yankees for four prospects including OF Clint Frazier and P Justus Sheffield, widely considered two of the top four prospects in the Indians' farm system. The Indians also had a deal on the table for Milwaukee Brewers C Jonathan Lucroy, but Lucroy exercised his no-trade clause and vetoed the trade to Cleveland. He would later be traded to the Texas Rangers.

=== August ===
The Indians struggled in early August, going just 3–6 in their first nine games. Their lead over the Tigers decreased to just 2 games. However, On August 11, the team opened an 11-game home stand - its longest of the season - that would put them on the winning track. The Indians swept a four-game series from the Anaheim Angels to open up the home stand and took two out of three games from the Toronto Blue Jays to end the home stand. The Blue Jays series, which was believed to be a potential playoff preview, featured three one-run games including a walk-off inside-the-park home run by OF Tyler Naquin. The Indians' lead over Detroit was back to 7 1/2 games by August 22.

The Indians would then go on a west-coast trip that saw them go 2–5, and score one run or less in six of the seven games. However, the team returned home to sweep the Minnesota Twins to end the month. On August 31, the team acquired OF Coco Crisp from the Oakland Athletics for cash considerations. The acquisition of Crisp added outfield depth for the pennant race and postseason run.

=== September/October ===
The Indians won six of their first eight games in September to maintain a sizable lead over the Detroit Tigers. However, the team's rotation, widely believed to be their biggest strength, suffered two major injuries during the month. All-Star SP Danny Salazar left the game on September 9 with a strained elbow, resulting in a 3-4 week recovery time. On September 17, SP Carlos Carrasco left the game with a broken hand as the result of a line-drive. This injury ended Carrasco's season. The Indians would put the Tigers away in September by winning two of three September 16–18. On September 26, the Indians clinched the division title - the team's first since 2007 - with a win over the Tigers.

The Indians would end the season with a record of 94–67, earning the No. 2 seed in the American League.

== Roster ==
2016 Cleveland Indians
**Roster**
**Pitchers**: 49 Austin Adams; 37 Cody Allen; 56 Cody Anderson; 51 Shawn Armstrong; 47 Trevor Bauer; 59 Carlos Carrasco; 62 Joba Chamberlain; 52 Mike Clevinger; 65 Joe Colón; 57 Kyle Crockett; 44 Ross Detwiler; 66 Perci Garner; 33 Tom Gorzelanny; 58 T. J. House; 48 Tommy Hunter; 28 Corey Kluber; 53 Jeff Manship; 34 Zach McAllister; 54 Ryan Merritt; 24 Andrew Miller; 50 Shawn Morimando; 61 Dan Otero; 62 Adam Plutko; 31 Danny Salazar; 27 Bryan Shaw; 43 Josh Tomlin	**Catchers**: 38 Chris Gimenez; 10 Yan Gomes; 45 Adam Moore; 55 Roberto Pérez; **Infielders**: 36 Jesús Aguilar; 9 Erik González; 22 Jason Kipnis; 12 Francisco Lindor; 26 Mike Napoli; 11 José Ramírez; 41 Carlos Santana; 4 Juan Uribe	**Outfielders**: 35 Abraham Almonte; 23 Michael Brantley; 6 Marlon Byrd; 8 Lonnie Chisenhall; 7 Collin Cowgill; 4 Coco Crisp; 20 Rajai Davis; 6 Brandon Guyer; 1 Michael Martínez; 30 Tyler Naquin	**Manager**: 17 Terry Francona; **Coaches**: 15 Sandy Alomar Jr. (first base/catchers); 87 Mike Barnett (replay coordinator); 46 Jason Bere (bullpen); 32 Mickey Callaway (pitching); 64 Armando Camacaro (bullpen catcher); 2 Brad Mills (bench); 82 Ricky Pacione (bullpen catcher); 60 Matt Quatraro (assistant hitting); 16 Mike Sarbaugh (third base/infield); 29 Ty Van Burkleo (hitting)

=== Season standings ===
==== American League Central ====
AL Central
Team	W	L	Pct.	GB	Home	Road
Cleveland Indians	94	67	.584	—	53‍–‍28	41‍–‍39
Detroit Tigers	86	75	.534	8	45‍–‍35	41‍–‍40
Kansas City Royals	81	81	.500	13½	47‍–‍34	34‍–‍47
Chicago White Sox	78	84	.481	16½	45‍–‍36	33‍–‍48
Minnesota Twins	59	103	.364	35½	30‍–‍51	29‍–‍52

==== American League Wild Card ====
Division leaders
Team	W	L	Pct.
Texas Rangers	95	67	.586
Cleveland Indians	94	67	.584
Boston Red Sox	93	69	.574

Wild Card teams (Top 2 teams qualify for postseason)
Team	W	L	Pct.	GB
Toronto Blue Jays	89	73	.549	—
Baltimore Orioles	89	73	.549	—
Detroit Tigers	86	75	.534	2½
Seattle Mariners	86	76	.531	3
New York Yankees	84	78	.519	5
Houston Astros	84	78	.519	5
Kansas City Royals	81	81	.500	8
Chicago White Sox	78	84	.481	11
Los Angeles Angels	74	88	.457	15
Oakland Athletics	69	93	.426	20
Tampa Bay Rays	68	94	.420	21
Minnesota Twins	59	103	.364	30

==== Record against opponents ====
2016 American League record Source: MLB Standings Grid – 2016
Team	BAL	BOS	CWS	CLE	DET	HOU	KC	LAA	MIN	NYY	OAK	SEA	TB	TEX	TOR	NL
Baltimore	—	8–11	4–3	5–1	5–2	1–6	4–2	4–2	5–1	10–9	3–4	1–6	13–6	3–4	9–10	14–6
Boston	11–8	—	3–4	4–2	2–5	5–2	2–4	4–3	4–3	11–8	5–1	4–3	12–7	3–3	9–10	14–6
Chicago	3–4	4–3	—	8–11	7–12	3–3	5–14	2–5	12–7	3–3	5–2	4–3	4–3	4–2	5–1	9–11
Cleveland	1–5	2–4	11–8	—	14–4	3–4	14–5	6–1	10–9	2–5	4–2	3–4	5–1	2–5	4–3	13–7
Detroit	2–5	5–2	12–7	4–14	—	4–2	7–12	2–4	15–4	3–3	4–3	4–3	6–1	2–4	3–4	13–7
Houston	6–1	2–5	3–3	4–3	2–4	—	3–4	13–6	5–2	2–4	13–6	11–8	3–3	4–15	2–5	11–9
Kansas City	2–4	4–2	14–5	5–14	12–7	4–3	—	1–5	15–4	2–5	1–6	3–4	5–2	1–6	2–4	10–10
Los Angeles	2–4	3–4	5–2	1–6	4–2	6–13	5–1	—	2–4	1–6	12–7	8–11	3–4	9–10	4–3	9–11
Minnesota	1–5	3–4	7–12	9–10	4–15	2–5	4–15	4–2	—	2–5	2–4	4–2	3–4	5–2	1–6	8–12
New York	9–10	8–11	3–3	5–2	3–3	4–2	5–2	6–1	5–2	—	4–3	3–3	11–8	3–4	7–12	8–12
Oakland	4–3	1–5	2–5	2–4	3–4	6–13	6–1	7–12	4–2	3–4	—	7–12	5–2	9–10	3–3	7–13
Seattle	6–1	3–4	3–4	4–3	3–4	8–11	4–3	11–8	2–4	3–3	12–7	—	4–2	7–12	3–3	13–7
Tampa Bay	6–13	7–12	3–4	1–5	1–6	3–3	2–5	4–3	4–3	8–11	2–5	2–4	—	4–2	11–8	10–10
Texas	4–3	3–3	2–4	5–2	4–2	15–4	6–1	10–9	2–5	4–3	10–9	12–7	2–4	—	3–4	13–7
Toronto	10–9	10–9	1–5	3–4	4–3	5–2	4–2	3–4	6–1	12–7	3–3	3–3	8–11	4–3	—	13–7

=== Game log ===
2016 Game Log: 94–67 (Home: 53–28; Away: 41–39)
April: 10–11 (Home: 3–5; Away: 7–6)

#	Date	Opponent	Score	Win	Loss	Save	Attendance	Record	Streak
—	April 4	Red Sox	Postponed (rain). Makeup date: April 5.						
1	April 5	Red Sox	2–6	Price (1–0)	**Kluber** (0–1)	–	34,493	0–1	L1
2	April 6	Red Sox	7–6	**McAllister** (1–0)	Tazawa (0–1)	**Allen** (1)	10,298	1–1	W1
—	April 7	Red Sox	Postponed (rain). Makeup date: August 15.						
3	April 8	@ White Sox	7–1	**Salazar** (1–0)	Danks (0–1)	—	38,019	2–1	W2
4	April 9	@ White Sox	3–7	Sale (2–0)	**Shaw** (0–1)	—	20,192	2–2	L1
—	April 10	@ White Sox	Postponed (rain). Makeup date: May 23 (Game 1).						
5	April 12	@ Rays	1–5	Cedeño (1–0)	**Kluber** (0–2)	—	10,283	2–3	L2
6	April 13	@ Rays	4–1	**Carrasco** (1–0)	Smyly (0–2)	**Allen** (2)	10,117	3–3	W1
7	April 14	@ Rays	6–0	**Salazar** (2–0)	Archer (0–3)	—	10,715	4–3	W2
8	April 15	Mets	5–6	Colón (1–1)	**Anderson** (0–1)	Familia (3)	15,365	4–4	L1
9	April 16	Mets	7–5	**Tomlin** (1–0)	Harvey (0–3)	**Allen** (3)	20,165	5–4	W1
10	April 17	Mets	0–6	Matz (1–1)	**Kluber** (0–3)	—	17,621	5–5	L1
11	April 19	Mariners	3–2	**Carrasco** (2–0)	Miley (0–2)	**Allen** (4)	9,393	6–5	W1
12	April 20	Mariners	1–2	Walker (1–0)	**Salazar** (2–1)	Cishek (2)	9,980	6–6	L1
13	April 21	Mariners	7–10 (10)	Zych (1–0)	**Allen** (0–1)	Cishek (3)	11,525	6–7	L2
14	April 22	@ Tigers	2–1	**Tomlin** (2–0)	Verlander (1–2)	**Allen** (5)	25,086	7–7	W1
15	April 23	@ Tigers	10–1	**Kluber** (1–3)	Sánchez (2–2)	—	31,163	8–7	W2
16	April 24	@ Tigers	6–3	**Bauer** (1–0)	Greene (1–2)	**Allen** (6)	31,947	9–7	W3
17	April 25	@ Twins	3–4	Jepsen (1–3)	**McAllister** (1–1)	—	17,503	9–8	L1
18	April 26	@ Twins	5–6	Jepsen (2–3)	**Allen** (0–2)	—	17,493	9–9	L2
19	April 27	@ Twins	6–5	**Tomlin** (3–0)	Berríos (0–1)	**Allen** (7)	17,746	10–9	W1
20	April 29	@ Phillies	3–4 (11)	Hernandez (1–1)	**Allen** (0–3)	—	18,677	10–10	L1
21	April 30	@ Phillies	3–4	Bailey (1–0)	**Hunter** (0–1)	Gómez (8)	23,636	10–11	L2

May: 16–13 (Home: 9–7; Away: 7–6)

#	Date	Opponent	Score	Win	Loss	Save	Attendance	Record	Streak
22	May 1	@ Phillies	1–2	Velasquez (5–2)	**Salazar** (2–2)	Neris (1)	23,809	10–12	L3
23	May 3	Tigers	7–3	**Tomlin** (4–0)	Verlander (2–3)	—	11,022	11–12	W1
24	May 4	Tigers	4–0	**Kluber** (2–3)	Sánchez (3–3)	—	8,766	12–12	W2
25	May 5	Tigers	9–4	**Bauer** (2–0)	Fulmer (1–1)	—	10,350	13–12	W3
26	May 6	Royals	7–1	**Salazar** (3–2)	Ventura (2–2)	—	13,587	14–12	W4
27	May 7	Royals	0–7	Kennedy (4–2)	**Anderson** (0–2)	—	17,302	14–13	L1
28	May 8	Royals	5–4	**Tomlin** (5–0)	Vólquez (3–3)	**Allen** (8)	14,463	15–13	W1
29	May 9	@ Astros	1–7	Fiers (3–1)	**Kluber** (2–4)	—	20,222	15–14	L1
30	May 10	@ Astros	4–0	**Bauer** (3–0)	Devenski (0–2)	—	23,976	16–14	W1
31	May 11	@ Astros	3–5 (16)	Feliz (1–0)	**Anderson** (0–3)	—	24,453	16–15	L1
32	May 13	Twins	7–6	**McAllister** (2–1)	May (0–2)	**Allen** (9)	17,803	17–15	W1
33	May 14	Twins	3–6	Santana (1–2)	**Kluber** (2–5)	—	15,428	17–16	L1
34	May 15	Twins	1–5	Duffey (1–2)	**Bauer** (3–1)	—	13,236	17–17	L2
35	May 16	Reds	15–6	**Hunter** (1–1)	Lamb (0–1)	—	12,184	18–17	W1
36	May 17	Reds	13–1	**Salazar** (4–2)	Simón (1–4)	—	13,095	19–17	W2
37	May 18	@ Reds	8–7 (12)	**Allen** (1–3)	Sampson (0–1)	**Otero** (1)	22,815	20–17	W3
38	May 19	@ Reds	7–2	**Tomlin** (6–0)	Cotham (0–3)	—	21,173	21–17	W4
39	May 20	@ Red Sox	4–2	**Kluber** (3–5)	Buchholz (2–4)	**Allen** (10)	37,354	22–17	W5
40	May 21	@ Red Sox	1–9	Kelly (2–0)	**Bauer** (3–2)	—	37,254	22–18	L1
41	May 22	@ Red Sox	2–5	Porcello (7–2)	**Salazar** (4–3)	Kimbrel (12)	36,021	22–19	L2
42	May 23	@ White Sox	6–7	Latos (6–1)	**Clevinger** (0–1)	Robertson (12)		22–20	L3
43	May 23	@ White Sox	5–1	**Anderson** (1–3)	Johnson (0–2)	—	18,323	23–20	W1
44	May 24	@ White Sox	6–2	**Tomlin** (7–0)	Sale (9–1)	—	21,550	24–20	W2
45	May 25	@ White Sox	4–3	**Kluber** (4–5)	Quintana (5–4)	**Allen** (11)	22,561	25–20	W3
46	May 27	Orioles	4–6	Bundy (1–1)	**McAllister** (2–2)	Britton (13)	21,054	25–21	L1
47	May 28	Orioles	11–4	**Salazar** (5–3)	Jiménez (2–6)	—	21,110	26–21	W1
48	May 29	Orioles	4–6	Tillman (7–1)	**Manship** (0–1)	Britton (14)	18,565	26–22	L1
49	May 30	Rangers	2–9	Holland (4–4)	**Tomlin** (7–1)	Ramos (1)	14,514	26–23	L2
50	May 31	Rangers	3–7	Lewis (5–0)	**Kluber** (4–6)	Dyson (6)	10,428	26–24	L3

June: 22–6 (Home: 11–0; Away: 11–6)

#	Date	Opponent	Score	Win	Loss	Save	Attendance	Record	Streak
51	June 1	Rangers	5–4 (11)	**Gorzelanny** (1–0)	Claudio (1–1)	—	10,524	27–24	W1
52	June 2	Royals	5–4	**Hunter** (2–1)	Soria (2–2)	—	11,131	28–24	W2
53	June 3	Royals	6–1	**Salazar** (6–3)	Vólquez (5–5)	—	24,753	29–24	W3
54	June 4	Royals	7–1	**Tomlin** (8–1)	Kennedy (4–4)	—	23,258	30–24	W4
55	June 5	Royals	7–0	**Kluber** (5–6)	Young (2–6)	—	16,747	31–24	W5
56	June 6	@ Mariners	3–1	**Bauer** (4–2)	Paxton (0–2)	**Allen** (12)	15,824	32–24	W6
57	June 7	@ Mariners	1–7	Miley (6–2)	**Anderson** (1–4)	—	16,944	32–25	L1
58	June 8	@ Mariners	0–5	Walker (3–6)	**Carrasco** (2–1)	—	15,337	32–26	L2
59	June 9	@ Mariners	5–3	**Otero** (1–0)	Benoit (1–1)	**Allen** (13)	19,901	33–26	W1
60	June 10	@ Angels	6–2	**Kluber** (6–6)	Santiago (3–4)	—	39,487	34–26	W2
61	June 11	@ Angels	3–4	Salas (3–2)	**Shaw** (0–2)	—	38,296	34–27	L1
62	June 12	@ Angels	8–3	**Salazar** (7–3)	Huff (0–2)	—	36,383	35–27	W1
63	June 13	@ Royals	1–2	Vólquez (6–6)	**Carrasco** (2–2)	Davis (18)	31,269	35–28	L1
64	June 14	@ Royals	2–3	Soria (3–2)	**Shaw** (0–3)	—	29,293	35–29	L2
65	June 15	@ Royals	4–9	Kennedy (5–5)	**Kluber** (6–7)	—	33,546	35–30	L3
66	June 17	White Sox	3–2	**Allen** (2–3)	Jones (2–2)	—	27,912	36–30	W1
67	June 18	White Sox	13–2	**Salazar** (8–3)	Shields (2–9)	—	31,066	37–30	W2
68	June 19	White Sox	3–2 (10)	**Otero** (2–0)	Robertson (0–1)	—	25,269	38–30	W3
69	June 20	Rays	7–4	**Shaw** (1–3)	Ramírez (7–5)	**Allen** (14)	13,811	39–30	W4
70	June 21	Rays	6–0	**Kluber** (7–7)	Snell (0–2)	—	15,629	40–30	W5
71	June 22	Rays	6–1	**Bauer** (5–2)	Archer (4–10)	—	21,216	41–30	W6
72	June 24	@ Tigers	7–5	**Salazar** (9–3)	Zimmermann (9–4)	—	37,886	42–30	W7
73	June 25	@ Tigers	6–0	**Carrasco** (3–2)	Sánchez (4–8)	—	39,028	43–30	W8
74	June 26	@ Tigers	9–3	**Tomlin** (9–1)	Verlander (7–6)	—	36,502	44–30	W9
75	June 27	@ Braves	8–3	**Bauer** (6–2)	Jenkins (0–1)	—	15,538	45–30	W10
76	June 28	@ Braves	5–3	**Kluber** (8–7)	Vizcaíno (1–3)	**Allen** (15)	19,206	46–30	W11
77	June 29	@ Braves	3–0	**Salazar** (10–3)	De La Cruz (0–1)	**Allen** (16)	16,600	47–30	W12
78	June 30	@ Blue Jays	4–1	**Carrasco** (4–2)	Dickey (5–9)	**Allen** (17)	41,365	48–30	W13

July: 12–12 (Home: 7–5; Away: 5–7)

#	Date	Opponent	Score	Win	Loss	Save	Attendance	Record	Streak
79	July 1	@ Blue Jays	2–1 (19)	**Bauer** (7–2)	Barney (0–1)	—	45,825	49–30	W14
80	July 2	@ Blue Jays	6–9	Grilli (2–2)	**Otero** (2–1)	Osuna (16)	46,197	49–31	L1
81	July 3	@ Blue Jays	1–17	Happ (11–3)	**Kluber** (8–8)	—	45,962	49–32	L2
82	July 4	Tigers	5–3	**Manship** (1–1)	Rondón (2–1)	**Allen** (18)	34,163	50–32	W1
83	July 5	Tigers	12–1	**Carrasco** (5–2)	Sánchez (5–9)	—	19,448	51–32	W2
84	July 6	Tigers	2–12	Fulmer (9–2)	**Tomlin** (9–2)	—	24,098	51–33	L1
85	July 7	Yankees	4–5	Nova (6–5)	**Bauer** (7–3)	Chapman (17)	23,848	51–34	L2
86	July 8	Yankees	10–2	**Kluber** (9–8)	Green (1–2)	—	34,045	52–34	W1
87	July 9	Yankees	6–7 (11)	Chapman (3–0)	**Hunter** (2–2)	—	32,951	52–35	L1
88	July 10	Yankees	7–11	Eovaldi (7–6)	**Carrasco** (5–3)	—	29,089	52–36	L2
**87th All-Star Game in San Diego, California**
89	July 15	@ Twins	5–2	**Carrasco** (6–3)	Santana (3–8)	**Allen** (19)	27,074	53–36	W1
90	July 16	@ Twins	4–5 (11)	May (1–2)	**Colón** (0–1)	—	29,447	53–37	L1
91	July 17	@ Twins	6–1	**Tomlin** (10–2)	Gibson (2–6)	—	25,692	54–37	W1
92	July 18	@ Royals	3–7	Hochevar (2–2)	**Shaw** (1–4)	Davis (20)	38,042	54–38	L1
93	July 19	@ Royals	7–3	**Salazar** (11–3)	Flynn (1–1)	—	31,144	55–38	W1
94	July 20	@ Royals	11–4	**Carrasco** (7–3)	Kennedy (6–8)	—	33,455	56–38	W2
95	July 22	@ Orioles	1–5	Bundy (3–2)	**Bauer** (7–4)	Britton (31)	39,358	56–39	L1
96	July 23	@ Orioles	2–5	Gausman (2–7)	**Tomlin** (10–3)	Britton (32)	31,946	56–40	L2
97	July 24	@ Orioles	3–5	O'Day (3–1)	**Allen** (2–4)	—	37,821	56–41	L3
98	July 26	Nationals	7–6	**Shaw** (2–4)	Papelbon (2–4)	—	23,711	57–41	W1
99	July 27	Nationals	1–4	Strasburg (14–1)	**Carrasco** (7–4)	Treinen (1)	26,607	57–42	L1
100	July 29	Athletics	5–3	**Anderson** (2–4)	Graveman (7–7)	**Allen** (20)	33,134	58–42	W1
101	July 30	Athletics	6–3	**Tomlin** (11–3)	Overton (1–2)	—	32,850	59–42	W2
102	July 31	Athletics	8–0	**Kluber** (10–8)	Gray (5–10)	—	23,739	60–42	W3

August: 16–14 (Home: 12–6; Away: 4–8)

#	Date	Opponent	Score	Win	Loss	Save	Attendance	Record	Streak
103	August 1	Twins	5–12	Berríos (2–1)	**Salazar** (11–4)	—	15,018	60–43	L1
104	August 2	Twins	6–10	Pressly (6–5)	**Carrasco** (7–5)	—	15,835	60–44	L2
105	August 3	Twins	5–13	Duffey (6–8)	**Bauer** (7–5)	—	17,176	60–45	L3
106	August 4	Twins	9–2	**Otero** (3–1)	Santiago (10–5)	—	19,193	61–45	W1
107	August 5	@ Yankees	7–13	Pineda (6–10)	**Tomlin** (11–4)	—	39,252	61–46	L1
108	August 6	@ Yankees	5–2	**Kluber** (11–8)	Sabathia (6–9)	**Miller** (10)	37,264	62–46	W1
109	August 7	@ Yankees	2–3	Tanaka (8–4)	**Carrasco** (7–6)	Betances (2)	39,720	62–47	L1
110	August 9	@ Nationals	3–1	**Bauer** (8–5)	Scherzer (12–7)	**Allen** (21)	30,978	63–47	W1
111	August 10	@ Nationals	4–7	Gonzalez (8–9)	**Tomlin** (11–5)	Melancon (32)	30,185	63–48	L1
112	August 11	Angels	14–4	**Kluber** (12–8)	Chacín (2–6)	—	16,652	64–48	W1
113	August 12	Angels	13–3	**Carrasco** (8–6)	Skaggs (1–1)	—	27,014	65–48	W2
114	August 13	Angels	5–1	**Clevinger** (1–1)	Shoemaker (6–13)	—	30,409	66–48	W3
115	August 14	Angels	5–4	**Bauer** (9–5)	Weaver (8–10)	**Allen** (22)	18,979	67–48	W4
116	August 15	Red Sox	2–3	Pomeranz (9–9)	**Tomlin** (11–6)	Kimbrel (20)	19,174	67–49	L1
117	August 16	White Sox	3–1	**Kluber** (13–8)	Quintana (9–9)	**Allen** (23)	13,857	68–49	W1
118	August 17	White Sox	7–10	Turner (0–2)	**Allen** (2–5)	Robertson (30)	14,371	68–50	L1
119	August 18	White Sox	5–4	**Miller** (7–1)	Turner (1–2)	—	12,982	69–50	W1
120	August 19	Blue Jays	3–2	**Manship** (2–1)	Osuna (2–2)	—	30,665	70–50	W2
121	August 20	Blue Jays	5–6	Biagini (4–2)	**Tomlin** (11–7)	Osuna (28)	33,604	70–51	L1
122	August 21	Blue Jays	3–2	**Clevinger** (2–1)	Cecil (1–7)	**Allen** (24)	26,696	71–51	W1
123	August 22	@ Athletics	1–0	**Carrasco** (9–6)	Dull (5–4)	**Miller** (11)	10,114	72–51	W2
124	August 23	@ Athletics	1–9	Manaea (5–8)	**Salazar** (11–5)	—	13,141	72–52	L1
125	August 24	@ Athletics	1–5	Graveman (10–8)	**Bauer** (9–6)	—	12,795	72–53	L2
126	August 25	@ Rangers	0–9	Hamels (14–4)	**Tomlin** (11–8)	—	23,768	72–54	L3
127	August 26	@ Rangers	12–1	**Kluber** (14–8)	Pérez (8–10)	—	31,853	73–54	W1
128	August 27	@ Rangers	0–7	Griffin (6–3)	**Carrasco** (9–7)	—	44,944	73–55	L1
129	August 28	@ Rangers	1–2	Holland (6–6)	**Salazar** (11–6)	—	35,225	73–56	L2
130	August 29	Twins	1–0 (10)	**McAllister** (3–2)	Kintzler (0–1)	—	11,327	74–56	W1
131	August 30	Twins	5–4	**Otero** (4–1)	Wimmers (0–1)	**Miller** (12)	11,937	75–56	W2
132	August 31	Twins	8–4	**Kluber** (15–8)	Dean (1–5)	**Shaw** (1)	11,811	76–56	W3

September/October: 18–11 (Home: 11–5; Away: 7–6)

#	Date	Opponent	Score	Win	Loss	Save	Attendance	Record	Streak
133	September 2	Marlins	6–2	**Carrasco** (10–7)	Cashner (4–11)	—	24,415	77–56	W4
134	September 3	Marlins	8–3	**Bauer** (10–6)	Fernández (13–8)	—	27,483	78–56	W5
135	September 4	Marlins	6–5	**Allen** (3–5)	Rodney (2–4)	—	25,910	79–56	W6
136	September 5	Astros	2–6	Fiers (10–6)	**Clevinger** (2–2)	—	13,062	79–57	L1
137	September 6	Astros	3–4	Hoyt (1–0)	**Kluber** (15–9)	Giles (9)	11,023	79–58	L2
138	September 7	Astros	6–5	**Carrasco** (11–7)	Fister (12–11)	**Allen** (25)	12,063	80–58	W1
139	September 8	Astros	10–7	**Bauer** (11–6)	Paulino (0–1)	**Allen** (26)	15,275	81–58	W2
140	September 9	@ Twins	5–4	**Colón** (1–1)	Duffey (8–11)	**Allen** (27)	20,173	82–58	W3
141	September 10	@ Twins	1–2 (12)	Chargois (1–1)	**Colón** (1–2)	—	23,584	82–59	L1
142	September 11	@ Twins	7–1	**Kluber** (16–9)	Berríos (2–6)	—	20,301	83–59	W1
143	September 12	@ White Sox	4–11	González (4–6)	**Carrasco** (11–8)	—	12,588	83–60	L1
144	September 13	@ White Sox	1–8	Quintana (12–10)	**Bauer** (11–7)	—	15,588	83–61	L2
145	September 14	@ White Sox	6–1	**Tomlin** (12–8)	Rodon (7–9)	—	15,808	84–61	W1
146	September 15	@ White Sox	1–2	Robertson (5–3)	**Shaw** (2–5)	—	14,190	84–62	L1
147	September 16	Tigers	11–4	**Kluber** (17–9)	Fulmer (10–7)	—	29,137	85–62	W1
148	September 17	Tigers	1–0 (10)	**Miller** (8–1)	Wilson (4–5)	—	26,654	86–62	W2
149	September 18	Tigers	5–9	Norris (3–2)	**Bauer** (11–8)	Rodríguez (43)	21,382	86–63	L1
150	September 20	Royals	2–1	**Miller** (9–1)	Flynn (1–2)	—	13,623	87–63	W1
151	September 21	Royals	4–3	**Kluber** (18–9)	Kennedy (11–10)	**Allen** (28)	13,888	88–63	W2
152	September 22	Royals	5–2	**Otero** (5–1)	Gee (7–9)	**Allen** (29)	15,253	89–63	W3
153	September 23	White Sox	10–4	**Bauer** (12–8)	González (4–8)	—	18,937	90–63	W4
154	September 24	White Sox	1–8	Quintana (13–11)	**Anderson** (2–5)	—	32,088	90–64	L1
155	September 25	White Sox	0–3	Rodon (8–10)	**Tomlin** (8–10)	Robertson (36)	24,118	90–65	L2
156	September 26	@ Tigers	7–4	**Miller** (10–1)	Farmer (0–1)	**Allen** (30)	24,981	91–65	W1
157	September 27	@ Tigers	0–12	Verlander (16–8)	**Clevinger** (2–3)	—	25,696	91–66	L1
158	September 28	@ Tigers	3–6 (5)	Hardy (1–0)	**Colón** (1–3)	—	26,934	91–67	L2
—	September 29	@ Tigers	Cancelled (rain).						
159	September 30	@ Royals	7–2	**Merritt** (1–0)	Ventura (11–12)	—	24,741	92–67	W1
160	October 1	@ Royals	6–3	**Clevinger** (3–3)	Strahm (1–2)	**Allen** (31)	28,569	93–67	W2
161	October 2	@ Royals	3–2	**Tomlin** (13–9)	Kennedy (11–11)	**Allen** (32)	29,475	94–67	W3

Legend: = Win = Loss = Postponement
Bold = Indians team member

== Player stats ==
=== Batting ===
Note: G = Games played; AB = At bats; R = Runs; H = Hits; 2B = Doubles; 3B = Triples; HR = Home runs; RBI = Runs batted in; SB = Stolen bases; BB = Walks; AVG = Batting average; SLG = Slugging average

Player	G	AB	R	H	2B	3B	HR	RBI	SB	BB	AVG	SLG
Jason Kipnis	156	610	91	168	41	4	23	82	15	60	.275	.469
Francisco Lindor	158	604	99	182	30	3	15	78	19	57	.301	.435
Carlos Santana	158	582	89	151	31	3	34	87	5	99	.259	.498
José Ramírez	152	565	84	176	46	3	11	76	22	44	.312	.462
Mike Napoli	150	557	92	133	22	1	34	101	5	78	.239	.465
Rajai Davis	134	454	74	113	23	2	12	48	43	33	.249	.388
Lonnie Chisenhall	126	385	43	110	25	5	8	57	6	23	.286	.439
Tyler Naquin	116	321	52	95	18	5	14	43	6	36	.296	.514
Yan Gomes	74	251	22	42	11	1	9	34	0	9	.167	.327
Juan Uribe	73	238	19	49	9	0	7	25	0	15	.206	.332
Abraham Almonte	67	182	24	48	20	1	1	22	8	8	.264	.401
Roberto Pérez	61	153	14	28	6	1	3	17	0	23	.183	.294
Chris Gimenez	67	139	17	30	4	0	4	11	0	10	.216	.331
Marlon Byrd	34	115	11	31	6	0	5	19	0	11	.270	.452
Michael Martínez	59	95	15	23	4	0	1	4	0	3	.242	.316
Brandon Guyer	38	81	12	27	5	0	2	14	1	7	.333	.469
Coco Crisp	20	53	9	11	3	0	2	8	3	9	.208	.377
Michael Brantley	11	39	5	9	2	0	0	7	1	3	.231	.282
Erik González	21	16	2	5	0	0	0	0	0	1	.313	.313
Collin Cowgill	9	12	0	1	0	0	0	0	0	2	.083	.083
Jesús Aguilar	9	6	0	0	0	0	0	0	0	0	.000	.000
Adam Moore	9	5	0	0	0	0	0	0	0	0	.000	.000
Pitcher totals	161	21	3	3	2	0	0	0	0	0	.143	.238
Team totals	161	5484	777	1435	308	29	185	733	134	531	.262	.430

=== Pitching ===
Note: W = Wins; L = Losses; ERA = Earned run average; G = Games pitched; GS = Games started; SV = Saves; IP = Innings pitched; H = Hits allowed; R = Runs allowed; ER = Earned runs allowed; BB = Walks allowed; SO = Strikeouts

Player	W	L	ERA	G	GS	SV	IP	H	R	ER	BB	SO
Corey Kluber	18	9	3.14	32	32	0	215.1	170	82	75	57	227
Trevor Bauer	12	8	4.26	35	28	0	190.0	179	96	90	70	168
Josh Tomlin	13	9	4.40	30	29	0	174.0	187	97	85	20	118
Carlos Carrasco	11	8	3.32	25	25	0	146.1	134	64	54	34	150
Danny Salazar	11	6	3.87	25	25	0	137.1	121	61	59	63	161
Dan Otero	5	1	1.53	62	0	1	70.2	54	14	12	10	57
Cody Allen	3	5	2.51	67	0	32	68.0	41	23	19	27	87
Bryan Shaw	2	5	3.24	75	0	1	66.2	56	26	24	28	69
Cody Anderson	2	5	6.68	19	9	0	60.2	85	45	45	13	54
Mike Clevinger	3	3	5.26	17	10	0	53.0	50	31	31	29	50
Zach McAllister	3	2	3.44	53	2	0	52.1	53	21	20	23	54
Jeff Manship	2	1	3.12	53	0	0	43.1	40	20	15	22	36
Andrew Miller	4	0	1.55	26	0	3	29.0	14	5	5	2	46
Tommy Hunter	2	2	3.74	21	0	0	21.2	21	10	9	5	17
Joba Chamberlain	0	0	2.25	20	0	0	20.0	12	6	5	11	18
Austin Adams	0	0	9.82	19	0	0	18.1	27	22	20	7	17
Kyle Crockett	0	0	5.06	29	0	0	16.0	16	9	9	7	17
Ryan Merritt	1	0	1.64	4	1	0	11.0	6	2	2	0	6
Shawn Armstrong	0	0	2.53	10	0	0	10.2	9	3	3	5	7
Joe Colón	1	3	7.20	11	0	0	10.0	12	9	8	7	10
Perci Garner	0	0	4.82	8	0	0	9.1	12	6	5	5	12
Ross Detwiler	0	0	5.79	7	0	0	4.2	3	3	3	4	3
Shawn Morimando	0	0	11.57	2	0	0	4.2	9	6	6	5	5
Adam Plutko	0	0	7.36	2	0	0	3.2	5	3	3	2	3
Tom Gorzelanny	1	0	21.00	7	0	0	3.0	4	7	7	5	4
Chris Gimenez	0	0	12.00	2	0	0	3.0	4	4	4	0	0
TJ House	0	0	3.38	4	0	0	2.2	6	1	1	0	2
Team totals	94	67	3.84	161	161	37	1445.0	1330	676	617	461	1398

== Postseason ==
=== American League Division Series ===
By virtue of winning the AL Central, the Indians were placed in the American League Division Series against the AL East champion Boston Red Sox. Because the Indians had the better regular season record, they had home field advantage in the best-of-five series.

The Indians won Game 1, 5–4, thanks in part to a three-run 3rd inning that featured home runs by Roberto Perez, Jason Kipnis, and Francisco Lindor, the first postseason home run in each of their careers. The Indians' pitching was led by starter Trevor Bauer and relievers Andrew Miller and Cody Allen, who each threw over 40 pitches, to clinch the victory. Indians' ace Corey Kluber went seven shutout innings in Game 2, a 6-0 Indians' win. The big blow for the Indians was a Lonnie Chisenhall 3-run home run.

The Indians and Red Sox then had two days off - a regularly scheduled travel day and rainout as the remnants of Hurricane Matthew affected Boston. When the teams got back to baseball on October 10, Josh Tomlin and the Indians' bullpen would lead the team to a 4–3 victory and a sweep of the division series. The Red Sox mounted a rally in the bottom of the 9th, but Cody Allen was able to close out the game. The Indians would advance to the American League Championship Series for the first time since 2007.

=== American League Championship Series ===
The Indians would face the Toronto Blue Jays in the American League Championship Series, again having home-field advantage. The Indians would win a pair of pitchers' duels in Games 1 and 2, 2-0 and 2–1. In Game 1, the Indians scored their only runs on a Francisco Lindor home run in the sixth inning. Indians' starter Corey Kluber went six shutout innings and relievers Andrew Miller and Cody Allen completed the shutout. In Game 2, Carlos Santana's leadoff home run in the second off of Toronto pitcher J. A. Happ gave the Indians a 1−0 lead, but the Blue Jays tied it in the third with a Josh Donaldson RBI double. Cleveland responded with a Lindor RBI single in the third. Starter Josh Tomlin, along with Bryan Shaw, Miller, and Allen, would make that 2–1 lead stand up the rest of the game.

The series shifted to Toronto for Game 3. Indians' starter Trevor Bauer left the game in the bottom of the inning due to a bloody finger as a result of being cut from a drone before the series started. The bullpen answered the call and gave up two runs in more than 8 innings of work. Led by Mike Napoli and Jason Kipnis home runs, the Indians won this game 4–2, to take a 3–0 series lead.

=== Postseason game log ===
2016 Postseason Game Log: 10–5
American League Division Series: 3–0

#	Date	Opponent	Score	Win	Loss	Save	Attendance	Series	Box Score
1	October 6	Red Sox	5–4	**Miller** (1–0)	Porcello (0–1)	**Allen** (1)	37,763	1–0	Box
2	October 7	Red Sox	6–0	**Kluber** (1–0)	Price (0–1)	—	37,842	2–0	Box
—	October 9	@ Red Sox	Postponed (rain). Makeup date: October 10.						
3	October 10	@ Red Sox	4–3	**Tomlin** (1–0)	Buchholz (0–1)	**Allen** (2)	39,530	3–0	Box

American League Championship Series: 4–1

#	Date	Opponent	Score	Win	Loss	Save	Attendance	Series	Box Score
1	October 14	Blue Jays	2–0	**Kluber** (1–0)	Estrada (0–1)	**Allen** (1)	37,727	1–0	Box
2	October 15	Blue Jays	2–1	**Tomlin** (1–0)	Happ (0–1)	**Allen** (2)	37,870	2–0	Box
3	October 17	@ Blue Jays	4–2	**Shaw** (1–0)	Stroman (0–1)	**Miller** (1)	49,507	3–0	Box
4	October 18	@ Blue Jays	1–5	Sanchez (1–0)	**Kluber** (1–1)	—	49,142	3–1	Box
5	October 19	@ Blue Jays	3–0	**Shaw** (2–0)	Estrada (0–2)	**Allen** (3)	48,800	4–1	Box

World Series: 3–4

#	Date	Opponent	Score	Win	Loss	Save	Attendance	Series	Box Score
1	October 25	Cubs	6–0	**Kluber** (1–0)	Lester (0–1)	—	38,091	1–0	Box
2	October 26	Cubs	1–5	Arrieta (1–0)	**Bauer** (0–1)	—	38,172	1–1	Box
3	October 28	@ Cubs	1–0	**Miller** (1–0)	Edwards Jr. (0–1)	**Allen** (1)	41,703	2–1	Box
4	October 29	@ Cubs	7–2	**Kluber** (2–0)	Lackey (0–1)	—	41,706	3–1	Box
5	October 30	@ Cubs	2–3	Lester (1–1)	**Bauer** (0–2)	Chapman (1)	41,711	3–2	Box
6	November 1	Cubs	3–9	Arrieta (2–0)	**Tomlin** (0–1)	–	38,116	3–3	Box
7	November 2	Cubs	7–8 _{(10)}	Chapman (1–0)	**Shaw** (0–1)	Montgomery (1)	38,104	3–4	Box

Legend: = Win = Loss = Postponement
Bold = Indians team member

=== Postseason rosters ===
Playoff rosters
American League Division Series

- Pitchers: 24 Andrew Miller 27 Bryan Shaw 28 Corey Kluber 37 Cody Allen 43 Josh Tomlin 47 Trevor Bauer 52 Mike Clevinger 53 Jeff Manship 56 Cody Anderson 61 Dan Otero
- Catchers: 10 Yan Gomes 38 Chris Gimenez 55 Roberto Pérez
- Infielders: 1 Michael Martínez 11 José Ramírez 12 Francisco Lindor 22 Jason Kipnis 26 Mike Napoli
- Outfielders: 4 Coco Crisp 6 Brandon Guyer 8 Lonnie Chisenhall 20 Rajai Davis 30 Tyler Naquin
- Designated hitters: 41 Carlos Santana

American League Championship Series

- Pitchers: 24 Andrew Miller 27 Bryan Shaw 28 Corey Kluber 34 Zach McAllister 37 Cody Allen 43 Josh Tomlin 47 Trevor Bauer 52 Mike Clevinger 53 Jeff Manship 54 Ryan Merritt 56 Cody Anderson 61 Dan Otero
- Catchers: 10 Yan Gomes 55 Roberto Pérez
- Infielders: 1 Michael Martínez 11 José Ramírez 12 Francisco Lindor 22 Jason Kipnis 26 Mike Napoli
- Outfielders: 4 Coco Crisp 6 Brandon Guyer 8 Lonnie Chisenhall 20 Rajai Davis 30 Tyler Naquin
- Designated hitters: 41 Carlos Santana

World Series

- Pitchers: 24 Andrew Miller 27 Bryan Shaw 28 Corey Kluber 31 Danny Salazar 34 Zach McAllister 37 Cody Allen 43 Josh Tomlin 47 Trevor Bauer 52 Mike Clevinger 53 Jeff Manship 54 Ryan Merritt 61 Dan Otero
- Catchers: 10 Yan Gomes 55 Roberto Pérez
- Infielders: 1 Michael Martínez 11 José Ramírez 12 Francisco Lindor 22 Jason Kipnis 26 Mike Napoli
- Outfielders: 4 Coco Crisp 6 Brandon Guyer 8 Lonnie Chisenhall 20 Rajai Davis 30 Tyler Naquin
- Designated hitters: 41 Carlos Santana

== Farm system ==
Level	Team	League	Manager
AAA	Columbus Clippers	International League	Chris Tremie
AA	Akron RubberDucks	Eastern League	David Wallace
A-Advanced	Lynchburg Hillcats	Carolina League	Mark Budzinski
A	Lake County Captains	Midwest League	Tony Mansolino
A-Short Season	Mahoning Valley Scrappers	New York–Penn League	Edwin Rodríguez
Rookie	AZL Indians	Arizona League	Anthony Medrano
Rookie	DSL Indians	Dominican Summer League	Jose Mejia

LEAGUE CHAMPIONS: Akron
