= 2016 American League Championship Series =

47th edition of Major League Baseball's American League Championship Series

Team (Wins)	Managers	Season
Cleveland Indians (4)	Terry Francona	94–67 (.584), GA: 8
Toronto Blue Jays (1)	John Gibbons	89–73 (.549), GB: 4
- Dates: October 14–19
- MVP: Andrew Miller (Cleveland)
- Umpires: Laz Díaz (Games 1–2), Mike Everitt, Brian Gorman (crew chief), Jeff Nelson, Jim Reynolds, Mark Wegner (Games 3–5) and Jim Wolf

Broadcast
- Television: United States: TBS (English); CNN en Español (Spanish); Canada: Sportsnet (English); RDS (French)
- TV announcers: Ernie Johnson Jr., Ron Darling, Cal Ripken Jr., and Sam Ryan (English); Pete Manzano and Fernando Palacios (Spanish); Alain Usereau and Marc Griffin (French)
- Radio: ESPN (English); ESPN Deportes (Spanish)
- Radio announcers: Jon Sciambi and Chris Singleton (English); Cristián Moreno and Renato Bermúdez (Spanish)
- ALDS: Toronto Blue Jays over Texas Rangers (3–0); Cleveland Indians over Boston Red Sox (3–0)

The 2016 American League Championship Series (ALCS) was a best-of-seven playoff pitting the second-seeded Cleveland Indians against the fourth-seeded Toronto Blue Jays for the American League (AL) pennant and the right to play in the 2016 World Series against the Chicago Cubs. The Indians had home-field advantage for the series because the Blue Jays qualified as a wild-card team. The Indians defeated the Blue Jays four games to one.

The series was the 47th in league history. TBS televised all games in the United States, with Sportsnet, a property of Toronto Blue Jays owner Rogers Communications, airing all games in Canada using the TBS feed.

The Indians would go on to lose to the Chicago Cubs in the World Series in seven games, after squandering a 3–1 series lead.

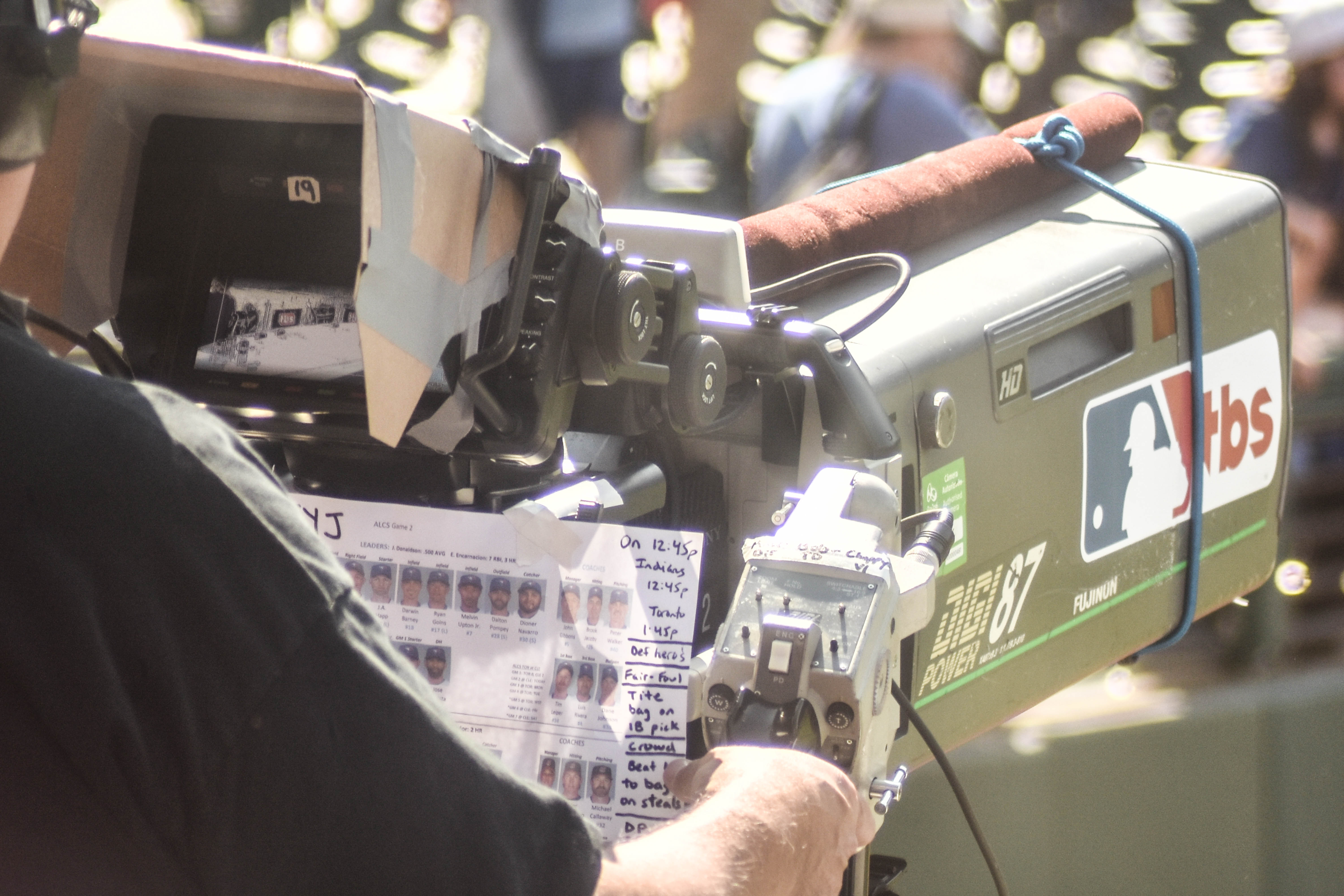
A TBS camera used for Game 2 of the 2016 ALCS. Visible are notes for the camera operator and thumbnail photographs of each player in the game.

== Background ==
This was Toronto's second consecutive ALCS appearance and seventh overall. The team lost the 2015 American League Championship Series to the eventual World Series champion Kansas City Royals. The Blue Jays had previously made consecutive ALCS appearances in 1991, 1992 and 1993, losing in the former but winning both the 1992 and 1993 World Series.

This was Cleveland's fifth appearance in the ALCS. The Indians won the ALCS in 1995 and 1997, but went on to lose the World Series both times. In their other two ALCS appearances, the Indians were defeated in 1998 and 2007.

This was the first postseason meeting between the Blue Jays and the Indians.

The Indians won the regular season series, 4–3. The two teams split a four-game series in Toronto in early July, and the Indians won two of three games in Cleveland in mid-August. Six of the seven games were decided by three runs or less, including four decided by one run. The July 1 game between the two teams at the Rogers Centre lasted 19 innings with the Indians winning that game.

Canadian architect and indigenous activist Douglas Cardinal tried to file an injunction barring the Indians from using their name and logo for Games 3 and 4 in Toronto, but the application was dismissed by an Ontario judge. Incidentally, this would be the last ALCS appearance for Cleveland with 'Indians' moniker, as they would change the name to 'Guardians' in 2022.

== Summary ==
Cleveland won the series, 4–1.

Game	Date	Score	Location	Time	Attendance
1	October 14	Toronto Blue Jays – 0, Cleveland Indians – 2	Progressive Field	2:44	37,727
2	October 15	Toronto Blue Jays – 1, Cleveland Indians – 2	Progressive Field	2:44	37,870
3	October 17	Cleveland Indians – 4, Toronto Blue Jays – 2	Rogers Centre	3:23	49,507
4	October 18	Cleveland Indians – 1, Toronto Blue Jays – 5	Rogers Centre	3:01	49,142
5	October 19	Cleveland Indians – 3, Toronto Blue Jays – 0	Rogers Centre	2:37	48,800

== Game summaries ==
=== Game 1 ===
October 14, 2016 8:08 pm (EDT) at Progressive Field in Cleveland, Ohio 55 °F (13 °C), mostly clear
Team	1	2	3	4	5	6	7	8	9	R	H	E
Toronto	0	0	0	0	0	0	0	0	0	0	7	0
Cleveland	0	0	0	0	0	2	0	0	X	2	6	0
WP: Corey Kluber (1–0) LP: Marco Estrada (0–1) Sv: Cody Allen (1); Home runs: TOR: None; CLE: Francisco Lindor (1); Attendance: 37,727; Boxscore

Corey Kluber pitched 6 1/3 shutout innings, allowing six hits while Andrew Miller struck out five batters in 1 2/3 innings. Toronto's Marco Estrada pitched a complete game, but took the loss when Francisco Lindor's two-run home run in the sixth after a Jason Kipnis walk provided the only runs of the game. Cody Allen pitched a perfect ninth for the save.

=== Game 2 ===
October 15, 2016 4:08 pm (EDT) at Progressive Field in Cleveland, Ohio 77 °F (25 °C), partly cloudy
Team	1	2	3	4	5	6	7	8	9	R	H	E
Toronto	0	0	1	0	0	0	0	0	0	1	3	1
Cleveland	0	1	1	0	0	0	0	0	X	2	4	0
WP: Josh Tomlin (1–0) LP: J. A. Happ (0–1) Sv: Cody Allen (2); Home runs: TOR: None; CLE: Carlos Santana (1); Attendance: 37,870; Boxscore

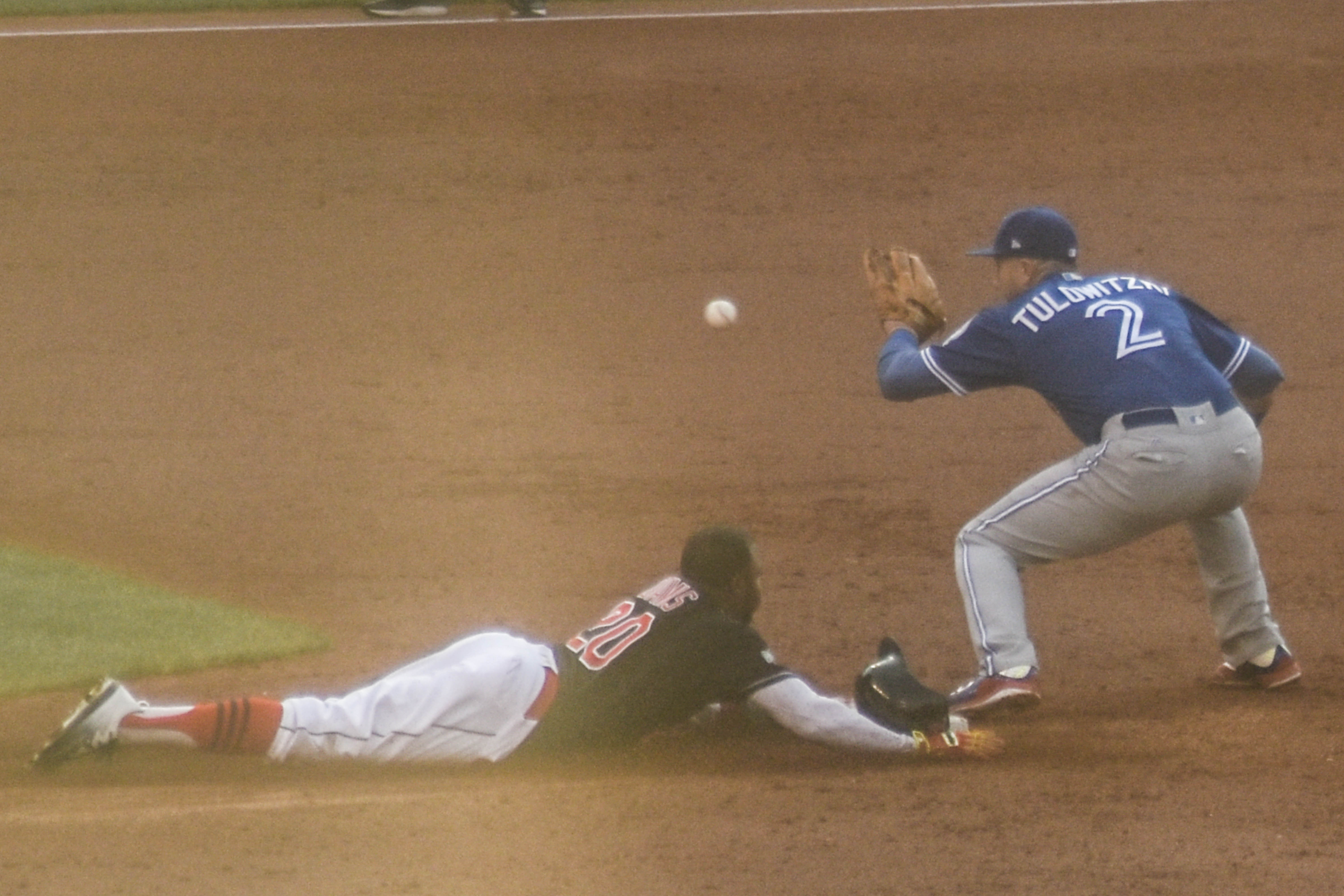
Rajai Davis steals second base in the bottom of the third inning of Game 2

Carlos Santana's leadoff home run in the second off J. A. Happ gave the Indians a 1−0 lead, but the Blue Jays tied it in the third off Josh Tomlin when Darwin Barney singled with one out, moved to second on a groundout and scored on Josh Donaldson's double. In the bottom of the inning, Rajai Davis reached first on a force-out, stole second, moved to third on a wild pitch, and scored on Francisco Lindor's two-out single. Neither team scored for the rest of the game with Andrew Miller striking out five batters in two innings pitched and Cody Allen pitching a perfect ninth for his second consecutive save. The Indians went up a perfect 2−0 in the series heading to Toronto.

=== Game 3 ===
October 17, 2016 8:08 pm (EDT) at Rogers Centre in Toronto, Ontario 73 °F (23 °C), roof closed
Team	1	2	3	4	5	6	7	8	9	R	H	E
Cleveland	1	0	0	1	0	2	0	0	0	4	7	0
Toronto	0	1	0	0	1	0	0	0	0	2	7	0
WP: Bryan Shaw (1–0) LP: Marcus Stroman (0–1) Sv: Andrew Miller (1); Home runs: CLE: Mike Napoli (1), Jason Kipnis (1); TOR: Michael Saunders (1); Attendance: 49,507; Boxscore

The Indians struck first off Marcus Stroman when Carlos Santana drew a leadoff walk in the first and scored on Mike Napoli's two out double, but their starter, Trevor Bauer had to leave the game in the bottom of the inning after allowing two walks and throwing 21 pitches due to a bloody pinkie finger as a result of being cut from a drone a few days earlier. Dan Otero in relief allowed a game-tying home run to Michael Saunders in the second. Napoli's home run in the fourth put the Indians back on top 2−1, but the Blue Jays tied it in the fifth off Zach McAllister when Ezequiel Carrera hit a leadoff triple and scored on Ryan Goins's groundout. Jason Kipnis's leadoff home run in the sixth gave the Indians a 3−2 lead. Stroman was taken out after walking Napoli with one out. Napoli moved to second on a wild pitch by reliever Joe Biagini and scored on José Ramírez's single to make it 4−2 Indians. Cody Allen and Andrew Miller combined to pitch three shutout innings, striking out five batters as the Indians took a 3–0 series lead.

=== Game 4 ===
October 18, 2016 4:08 pm (EDT) at Rogers Centre in Toronto, Ontario 73 °F (23 °C), roof closed
Team	1	2	3	4	5	6	7	8	9	R	H	E
Cleveland	0	0	0	0	1	0	0	0	0	1	2	1
Toronto	0	0	1	1	0	0	2	1	X	5	9	0
WP: Aaron Sanchez (1–0) LP: Corey Kluber (1–1); Home runs: CLE: None; TOR: Josh Donaldson (1); Attendance: 49,142; Boxscore

Josh Donaldson's two-out home run in the third off Corey Kluber gave the Blue Jays their first lead in the series. Kluber walked two straight to lead off the fourth before Ezequiel Carrera's one-out RBI single made it 2−0 Blue Jays. The Indians cut it to 2−1 in the fifth off Aaron Sanchez when Coco Crisp walked with one out, moved to second on a wild pitch, and scored on Roberto Pérez's double. Their only other hit in the game came on Tyler Naquin's leadoff double in the third. In the seventh, the Blue Jays loaded the bases with no outs off reliever Bryan Shaw on a single, Shaw's fielding error, and intentional walk when Edwin Encarnación's single scored two with Josh Donaldson being thrown out at third. Next inning, Carrera tripled with one out off Mike Clevinger and scored on Kevin Pillar's groundout to make it 5−1 Blue Jays. Roberto Osuna retired the Indians in order in the ninth, forcing a Game 5.

=== Game 5 ===
October 19, 2016 4:08 pm (EDT) at Rogers Centre in Toronto, Ontario 73 °F (23 °C), roof closed
Team	1	2	3	4	5	6	7	8	9	R	H	E
Cleveland	1	0	1	1	0	0	0	0	0	3	6	0
Toronto	0	0	0	0	0	0	0	0	0	0	6	1
WP: Bryan Shaw (2–0) LP: Marco Estrada (0–2) Sv: Cody Allen (3); Home runs: CLE: Carlos Santana (2), Coco Crisp (1); TOR: None; Attendance: 48,800; Boxscore

The Indians went up 1−0 in the first when Francisco Lindor singled with two outs off Marco Estrada and scored on Mike Napoli's double. They added to their lead with home runs by Carlos Santana in the third and Coco Crisp in the fourth. Ryan Merritt, Bryan Shaw, Andrew Miller, and Cody Allen shutout the Blue Jays as the Indians' 3−0 win gave them their first trip to the World Series since 1997. Allen earned his fifth save of the postseason as Troy Tulowitzki popped up to first baseman Santana in foul territory to end the game and series.

The Indians middle reliever Andrew Miller was voted the MVP of the series. The Indians also set an MLB record with the lowest batting average by a winning team in a postseason series, hitting just .168 against the Blue Jays.

Cleveland became the first club to lock up the AL pennant on the road since the Chicago White Sox did so at Angel Stadium of Anaheim in 2005.

=== Composite line score ===
2016 ALCS (4–1): Cleveland Indians beat Toronto Blue Jays.

Team	1	2	3	4	5	6	7	8	9	R	H	E
Cleveland Indians	2	1	2	2	1	4	0	0	0	12	25	1
Toronto Blue Jays	0	1	2	1	1	0	2	1	0	8	32	2
Total attendance: 223,046 Average attendance: 44,609

== Aftermath ==
The 2016 World Series between the Cubs and Indians was highly anticipated due to the historical ramifications; the two teams entered their matchup as the two franchises with the longest World Series title droughts, a combined 174 seasons without a championship. The Cubs defeated the Indians 4–3 to win their first World Series since 1908. Game 7, an 8–7 victory in 10 innings at Progressive Field, marked the fifth time that a Game 7 had gone into extra innings and the first since 1997 (which, coincidentally, the Indians also lost).

On December 23, 2016, the Cleveland Indians signed Edwin Encarnación, who had become a free agent after 6 1/2 years with the Toronto Blue Jays, and had declined the team's qualifying offer. At the 2018 trade deadline, Josh Donaldson also joined the Indians for a brief 16-game stint, as he was traded there from Toronto.

Overall, this marked the end of the Blue Jays run from 2015–2016, which was their most successful run as a franchise since the back-to-back championships in 1992 and 1993. By the time of their next postseason appearance in 2020, there were no players from the 2015–2016 teams on the roster. Game 4 was Toronto's last postseason win, until Game 1 of the 2025 American League Division Series against the New York Yankees.

The 2016 ALCS continued a streak of playoff success for Cleveland-based teams against their Toronto counterparts, as the NBA’s Cleveland Cavaliers also defeated the Toronto Raptors in the NBA playoffs in the 2016 Eastern Conference Finals, the Eastern Conference Semifinals in both 2017 and 2018, and first round in 2026.

This was the last American League Championship Series not to feature the Houston Astros (who did not make the playoffs this year) until 2024.
