= Zach McAllister =

American baseball player (born 1987)

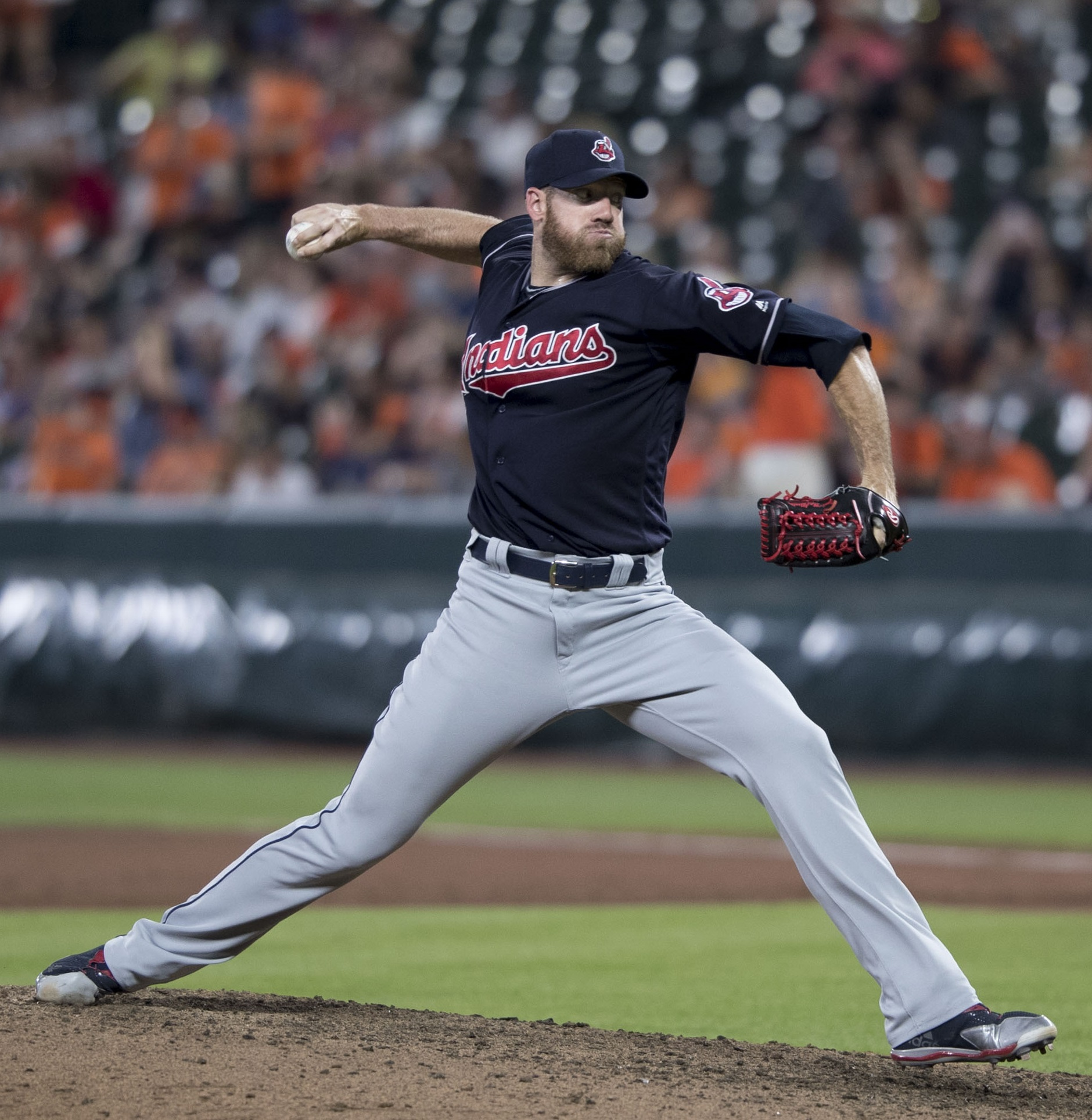
- McAllister pitching for the Cleveland Indians in 2017
- Pitcher
- Born: December 8, 1987 (age 38); Chillicothe, Illinois, U.S.
- Batted: Right Threw: Right

MLB debut
- July 7, 2011, for the Cleveland Indians

Last MLB appearance
- September 29, 2023, for the New York Yankees

MLB statistics
- Win–loss record: 29–35
- Earned run average: 4.15
- Strikeouts: 547
- Stats at Baseball Reference

Teams
- Cleveland Indians (2011–2018); Detroit Tigers (2018); New York Yankees (2023)

Zachary Taylor McAllister (born December 8, 1987) is an American former professional baseball pitcher. He played in Major League Baseball (MLB) for the Cleveland Indians, Detroit Tigers, and New York Yankees. He was drafted out of high school by the Yankees in 2006. After several seasons in the Yankees' minor league system, he was traded to the Indians in 2010. McAllister made his major league debut in July 2011 and earned his first major league win in May 2012.

== High school career ==
In high school, McAllister played soccer, football, basketball and baseball for Illinois Valley Central High School in Chillicothe, Illinois.

In basketball, McAllister was the starting center for IVC during his senior season. He helped lead the Ghosts to their first and only IHSA Class A boys basketball state finals. IVC lost to Seneca, 47–44 in the state championship game on March 11, 2006. He scored 10 points and grabbed six rebounds in the state title game. McAllister averaged 16.8 points and 7.9 rebounds on 61 percent (205–335) shooting from the field and 71 percent accuracy on free throws for the season. The 6-foot-5 center was named Peoria Journal Star first-team All-Area, honorable mention all-state with The Associated Press, third-team Illinois Basketball Coaches Association and first-team all-Mid-Illini Conference.

Three months later, McAllister helped guide the Grey Ghosts to the Class A baseball state finals – for the first time in program history. IVC beat Trenton Wesclin, 8–3, to win the 2006 A state championship on June 3, 2006. He pitched 1/3 inning of relief in the title game – hitting a batter and giving up an RBI single before striking out the final batter to secure the win. IVC finished the season with a 40–2 record and ranked No. 40 in the final 2006 Baseball America High School Top 50 rankings.

McAllister finished his senior season with a 12–1 record, sporting a 1.04 ERA, 116 strikeouts and 13 walks. He also hit .486 with 13 doubles, six home runs and 38 RBIs. He was named the 2006 Peoria Journal Star Baseball Player of the Year along with first-team all-state honors from Illinois Prep Baseball Report, Chicago Tribune and Illinois High School Baseball Coaches Association.

McAllister was named the Illinois Baseball Gatorade Player of the Year for 2005–2006.

== Professional career ==
=== New York Yankees ===
McAllister was drafted by the New York Yankees in the third round of the 2006 Major League Baseball draft. He went 5–2 with a 3.09 ERA in 11 appearances during the 2006 season for the Yankees' Gulf Coast League squad. In 2007, McAllister was in Short Season-A Staten Island. He posted a 4–6 record with a 5.17 ERA and 75 strikeouts in 71.1 innings.

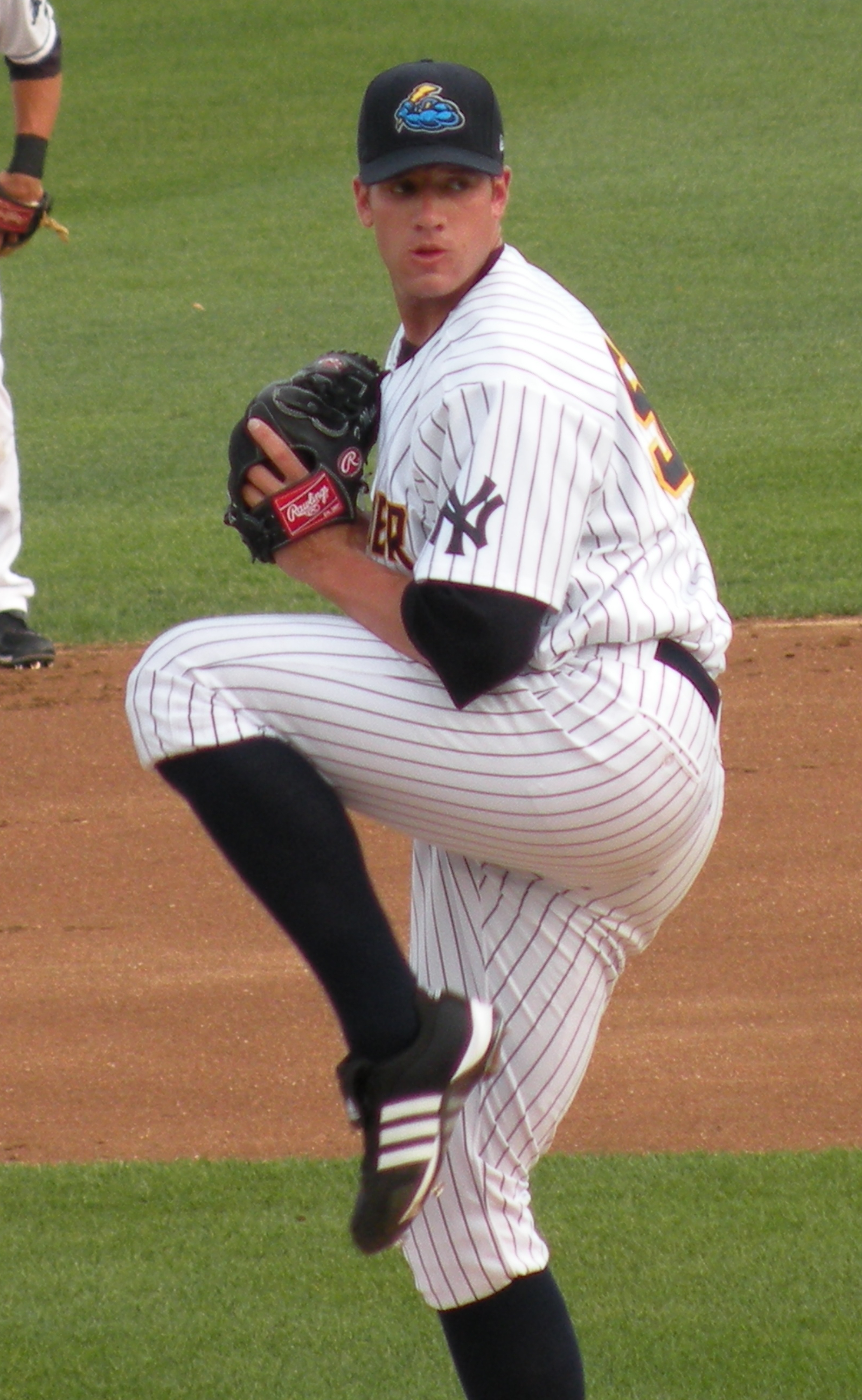
McAllister pitching in the 2009 Eastern League All-Star Game

McAllister was ranked the Yankees' sixth best prospect prior to the 2009 season, according to Baseball America, and their fifth best prospect prior to the 2010 season. He was named the Yankees' Minor League Pitcher of the Year in 2009 for his performance with the Double-A Trenton Thunder. However, he struggled in 2010 with the Triple-A Scranton/Wilkes-Barre Yankees.

At the 2010 MLB trade deadline, the Yankees and Seattle Mariners almost completed a deal that would have sent McAllister, Jesús Montero, and David Adams to the Seattle Mariners for Cliff Lee. When the teams shared medical reports, the Mariners determined that Adams' ankle was broken, not sprained. As a result, they chose to trade Lee to the Texas Rangers in a package centered on Justin Smoak.

=== Cleveland Indians ===
On August 20, McAllister was revealed to be the player to be named later in the July 30 trade between the Yankees and Cleveland Indians for Austin Kearns. After the 2010 season, McAllister was added to the Indians' 40-man roster to protect him from the Rule 5 draft.

After teammate Fausto Carmona was sent to the disabled list, McAllister was activated and made his major league debut against the Toronto Blue Jays on July 7, 2011, at Progressive Field in Cleveland. McAllister earned his first MLB victory on May 7, 2012, against the Chicago White Sox.

In a May 13, 2012, road game against the Boston Red Sox, McAllister started in place of injured pitcher Josh Tomlin and recorded a career-high eight strikeouts in a 4–1 loss. McAllister pitched seven innings and gave up four runs on eight hits. On August 6, McAllister gave up nine runs, but only two earned, in 1 2/3 innings.

McAllister was designated for assignment by the Indians on August 1, 2014. He cleared waivers and was sent outright to the Triple-A Columbus Clippers on August 3. In 2015, he had an ERA of 3 in 61 appearances. He was 4–4 in 69 innings.

At the end of the 2016 regular season, McAllister finished with a 3.44 ERA and would be added to the postseason roster as the Indians clinched its first American League (AL) Central division title since 2007. On October 17, McAllister made his first postseason debut as the fourth pitcher of Game 3 of the AL Championship Series against the Blue Jays. He faced three batters before giving up one run, before being pulled in favor of Bryan Shaw. During Game 2 of the World Series, McAllister made his second postseason appearance relieving Trevor Bauer. McAllister pitched through the fifth inning with two strikeouts before issuing a walk and two earned runs.

In 2017, McAllister appeared in 50 games, posting a 2–2 record, striking out 66 batters, walking 21, while posting a 1.19 WHIP and a 2.61 ERA. He recorded his 500th MLB strikeout on September 11, 2017, as the Indians captured their 19th win in a row. McAllister avoided arbitration with Cleveland on January 12, 2018, agreeing to a one-year, $2.45 million deal. McAllister was designated for assignment by Cleveland on August 3, and, after clearing waivers, was released on August 7.

=== Detroit Tigers ===
On August 10, 2018, McAllister signed a major league contract with the Detroit Tigers. Eight days later, McAllister was designated for assignment by the Tigers after playing in three games and giving up eight runs. On August 21, McAllister elected free agency after clearing waivers.

=== Los Angeles Dodgers ===
On August 27, 2018, the Los Angeles Dodgers signed McAllister to a minor league contract and assigned him to the Triple-A Oklahoma City Dodgers. He appeared in five games, pitching six innings and allowing six earned runs. McAllister elected free agency following the season on November 2.

On January 22, 2019, McAllister signed a one-year contract with the Texas Rangers. However, on March 25, the Rangers released McAllister. McAllister signed a minor league contract with the Dodgers organization on April 4. In 9 appearances for Triple-A Oklahoma City, he struggled to an 8.03 ERA with 19 strikeouts and 2 saves over 12 1/3 innings of work.

McAllister was invited to spring training with the Dodgers for the 2020 season. In April 2020, McAllister was playing catch with fellow professional pitcher Pat Venditte, when he felt his arm snap. He was later diagnosed with a fractured right humerus and underwent surgery. He became a free agent on November 2.

=== Philadelphia Phillies ===
On August 10, 2021, McAllister signed a minor league deal with the Philadelphia Phillies organization. He made 11 appearances, split between the Rookie-League FCL Phillies and Triple-A Lehigh Valley IronPigs. He pitched to a 1-1 record with a 4.22 ERA and 10 strikeouts. On September 22, McAllister was released by the Phillies.

=== St. Louis Cardinals ===
On March 15, 2022, McAllister signed a minor league contract with the St. Louis Cardinals. He appeared in 56 contests for the Triple-A Memphis Redbirds, recording a 3.99 ERA with 90 strikeouts in 67 2/3 innings pitched. He elected free agency following the season on November 10.

=== Arizona Diamondbacks ===
On December 15, 2022, McAllister signed a minor league deal with the Arizona Diamondbacks. He made 37 appearances for the Triple-A Reno Aces, posting a 4.93 ERA with 54 strikeouts and 3 saves in 38 1/3 innings of work. On August 2, 2023, McAllister was released by the Diamondbacks organization.

=== New York Yankees (second stint) ===
On August 5, 2023, McAllister signed a minor league contract with the New York Yankees organization. In 11 appearances for the Triple-A Scranton/Wilkes-Barre RailRiders, he recorded a 1.62 ERA with 20 strikeouts in 16 2/3 innings pitched. On September 12, the Yankees selected McAllister's contract, adding him to the major league roster. He made his Yankees debut on September 13, 17 years after the Yankees originally drafted him. McAllister became a free agent after the season.

== Coaching career ==
On January 22, 2026, McAllister was announced as a pitching consultant within the player development department of the Chicago White Sox.

== Pitching style ==
From 2010 to 2014, McAllister threw a four-seam and two-seam fastball in the low 90s, a cut fastball in the mid-high 80s, a changeup averaging about 80, and a curveball in the high 70s. Some sources also list him as throwing a slider. Since being converted into a reliever in 2015, McAllister relied on three pitches only.

== Personal life ==
McAllister hosted the inaugural Zach McAllister Baseball Camp on January 16, 2017, in Peoria, Illinois. All proceeds from the camp benefited St. Jude Children’s Research Hospital and Advocates for Access. He also held a silent auction dinner in collaboration with the baseball camp. A few items in the auction were Ben Zobrist's autographed and game-worn cleats and batting gloves, a Shaun Livingston autographed jersey, and a baseball bat signed by Jim Thome. McAllister also auctioned off a pair of autographed game-worn cleats as well as one of his World Series jerseys. A check presentation to Advocates for Access from McAllister for $7,500 occurred on August 10, 2017.

In his second year hosting his baseball camp, McAllister raised over $40,000 for Advocates for Access on January 15, 2018. The camp featured 105 campers – 3rd through 8th graders. He once again hosted a silent auction dinner the night before the baseball camp. There were close to 200 people in attendance. Silent auction items included autographed jerseys from soon-to-be Hall of Famer Jim Thome, Clayton Kershaw, and Derek Jeter.

McAllister's father, Steve played college baseball at Bradley University and was drafted by the Houston Astros in the 5th round of the 1981 Major League Baseball draft. He played in the minor league systems of the Astros and Pittsburgh Pirates from 1981–1986. He is currently a scout for the Arizona Diamondbacks.

Zach is married. He met his wife in Peoria, where they both are from.
