= Michael Martínez (baseball) =

Dominican baseball player (born 1982)

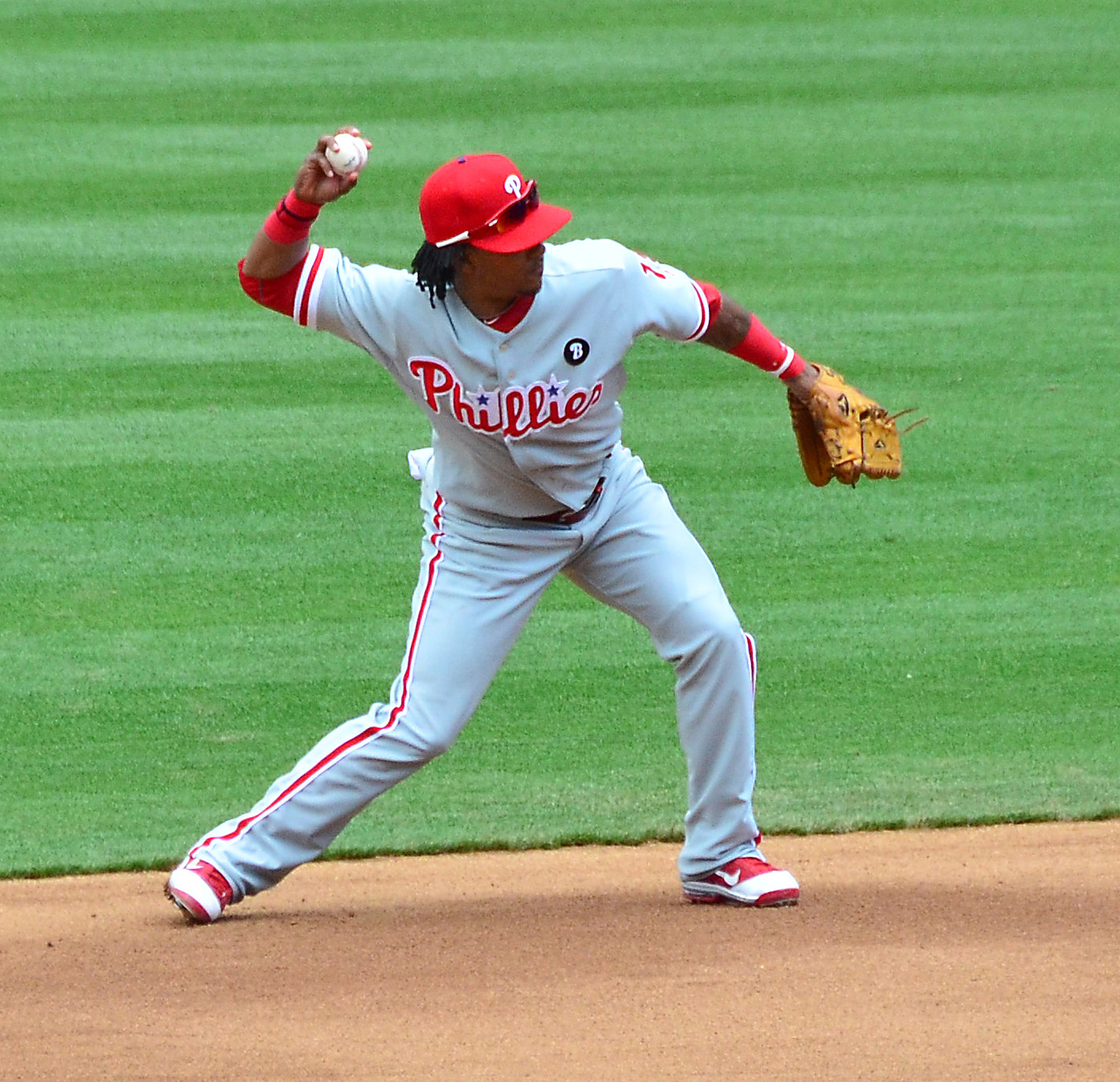
- Martínez with the Philadelphia Phillies in 2011

Free agent
- Utility player
- Born: September 16, 1982 (age 43); Santo Domingo, Dominican Republic
- Bats: Switch Throws: Right

MLB debut
- April 3, 2011, for the Philadelphia Phillies

MLB statistics (through 2017 season)
- Batting average: .194
- Home runs: 6
- Runs batted in: 42
- Stats at Baseball Reference

Teams
- Philadelphia Phillies (2011–2013); Pittsburgh Pirates (2014); Cleveland Indians (2015–2016); Boston Red Sox (2016); Cleveland Indians (2016–2017); Tampa Bay Rays (2017)

Michael Gabriel Martínez Tiburcio (born September 16, 1982) is a Dominican professional baseball utility player who is a free agent. He has previously played in Major League Baseball (MLB) for the Philadelphia Phillies, Pittsburgh Pirates, Cleveland Indians, Boston Red Sox, and Tampa Bay Rays. In a seven-year MLB career, Martínez played every position except catcher and first baseman.

== Early life and amateur career ==
Martínez was born in Santo Domingo, Dominican Republic, to a family of modest means. His mother worked as a domestic worker, washing and ironing clothes, while his father was a construction foreman who built numerous houses throughout the Dominican Republic.

Initially, Martínez focused primarily on basketball rather than baseball. He played professionally in the Dominican basketball league, appearing as a reinforcement player for teams including Bonao and other clubs in the superior tournament. He was a member of Club 29 de Junio in Los Minas, where he won a championship alongside players such as Kikima.

From 2004 to 2005, Martínez served in the Dominican National Police, where he also played amateur baseball. Despite having participated in several baseball tryouts with major league organizations, including sessions with Detroit Tigers scouts Ramón Peña and others, he had not secured a professional contract by age 22, an unusually advanced age for a baseball prospect.

In 2005, following a police league championship game, Martínez was spotted by Washington Nationals scout Pablo Neftalí Cruz. After initially hesitating due to concerns about leaving his stable position with the police force, Martínez ultimately decided to sign his first professional baseball contract with Washington for $7,000. The decision required him to leave the National Police, as he could not maintain both positions simultaneously.

== Professional career ==
=== Washington Nationals ===
Martínez began his professional baseball career in the Washington Nationals organization in 2006 at the age of 23, following his signing the previous year. His late entry into professional baseball, combined with his background in law enforcement and professional basketball, made him an unconventional prospect. That year, he played for the Vermont Lake Monsters, Savannah Sand Gnats and Potomac Nationals, hitting a combined .265 with 11 stolen bases in 82 games. In 2007, he played for the Hagerstown Suns and hit .250 with 13 stolen bases in 116 games. He played for the Potomac Nationals and Harrisburg Senators in 2009, posting a .259 batting average with 10 steals. In 2010, he played for the Senators and Syracuse Chiefs, hitting a combined .272 with 11 home runs and 23 stolen bases.

=== Philadelphia Phillies ===
The Philadelphia Phillies selected Martínez from the Nationals after the 2011 season as a Rule 5 draft pick. He made the Phillies' Opening Day roster as a reserve player. He made his major league debut on April 3 against the Houston Astros and recorded his first major league hit and RBI. He hit his first major league career home run on July 17 against the New York Mets. He spent the season acting as a utility infielder and outfielder, recording a .196 batting average with 3 home runs and 24 RBI in 89 games. Due to his remaining on the club's roster for the entire regular season, he remained in the organization thereafter per Rule 5 regulations.

Martínez opened the 2012 year on the Disabled List due to a broken foot suffered during Spring Training. He joined the Lehigh Valley IronPigs, the Phillies' Triple-A affiliate, in early June. After playing only one game with Lehigh Valley, Martínez returned to the Phillies' 25-man roster following an injury to second baseman Freddy Galvis. On June 27, Martínez was optioned to Lehigh Valley to make room for Chase Utley. Martínez was called up again when Mike Fontenot was designated for assignment.

Martínez began 2013 at Triple-A, but his contract was purchased on May 24 because Chase Utley was placed on the 15-day DL. He was designated for assignment on June 22, and outrighted off the roster on October 3. He elected free agency on October 8. In 29 games for the Phillies in 2013, he hit .175 with 3 RBI.

=== Pittsburgh Pirates ===
On December 18, 2013, the Pittsburgh Pirates signed Martínez to a minor league deal. His contract was selected from the Triple-A Indianapolis Indians on June 12, and he was optioned back to Indianapolis on August 19. He was designated for assignment on September 2, 2014, when the contract of Chase d'Arnaud was selected and was added to the 40-man roster. Martínez elected free agency in October 2014.

=== Cleveland Indians ===
Martínez signed a minor league deal with the Cleveland Indians on February 11, 2015. On April 9, 2015, he was assigned to the Triple-A Columbus Clippers. The Indians purchased his contract from Columbus on September 4, 2015, and added him to the major-league roster. On July 2, 2016, Martínez was designated for assignment to make room on the 25-man roster for Shawn Morimando after a 19-inning game the day before that exhausted the entire bullpen. He hit .283 in 60 at-bats for the Indians.

=== Boston Red Sox ===
On July 8, 2016, Martínez was traded to the Boston Red Sox in exchange for cash. During his time with Boston, Martínez hit .167/.286/.167 with no home runs and no RBI in 6 at bats. Martínez appeared in 4 games and started in one, playing right field.

=== Cleveland Indians (second stint) ===
After being designated for assignment by the Red Sox on August 2, 2016, Martínez was claimed by the Cleveland Indians off waivers on August 4. Martínez is best known for hitting into the final out to Kris Bryant in the Indians' Game 7 loss in the 2016 World Series to the Chicago Cubs, which was their first World Series championship in 108 years. On November 23, 2016, he was outrighted to Triple-A.

He signed a new minor league contract with the Indians organization on December 1.

The Indians purchased Martínez's contract on April 2, 2017, adding him to their 2017 opening day roster. Martínez was designated for assignment on May 14. He elected free agency following the season on November 6.

=== Tampa Bay Rays ===
On May 18, 2017, the Tampa Bay Rays acquired Martínez in exchange for cash considerations. He was designated for assignment on June 19 to create room for Trevor Plouffe. He became a free agent on June 23, 2017.

=== Cleveland Indians (third stint) ===
Martínez signed a minor league contract with the Cleveland Indians on June 25, 2017. He elected free agency on November 6, 2017.

On December 2, 2017, Martínez re–signed with the Indians on a new minor league contract that included an invitation to spring training. However, he did not appear for the organization in 2018 and elected free agency following the season on November 2, 2018.

=== Lancaster Barnstormers ===
On March 11, 2019, Martínez signed with the Lancaster Barnstormers of the independent Atlantic League of Professional Baseball. He became a free agent after the 2020 season.

=== High Point Rockers ===
On March 9, 2021, Martínez signed with the High Point Rockers of the Atlantic League of Professional Baseball. He made 51 appearances for High Point, batting .287/.354/.422 with 4 home runs and 30 RBI. He became a free agent following the season.

On February 8, 2022, Martínez re-signed with the Rockers for the 2022 season. He played in 75 games for High Point, hitting .304/.370/.424 with 5 home runs, 35 RBI, and 6 stolen bases. He became a free agent following the 2022 season.

On February 15, 2023, Martínez re-signed with the Rockers for the 2023 season. In 89 games for the club, he hit .249/.288/.357 with four home runs and 62 RBI.

On April 10, 2024, Martínez re–signed with High Point for a fourth consecutive season. In 34 appearances for the team, he slashed .279/.315/.412 with two home runs and 19 RBI.

On January 6, 2025, Martínez re-signed with the Rockers for a fifth consecutive season. However he did not appear in a game with them during the season.

== Personal life ==
Martínez's cousin Ángel Martínez currently plays in Major League Baseball for the Cleveland Guardians. His uncle, Sandy Martínez, played in MLB from 1995 to 2004.
