= Ryan Merritt =

American baseball player (born 1992)

- Starting pitcher
- Born: February 21, 1992 (age 34); McKinney, Texas, U.S.
- Batted: Left Threw: Left

MLB debut
- May 30, 2016, for the Cleveland Indians

Last MLB appearance
- August 30, 2017, for the Cleveland Indians

MLB statistics
- Win–loss record: 3–0
- Earned run average: 1.71
- Strikeouts: 13
- Stats at Baseball Reference

Teams
- Cleveland Indians (2016–2017)

Ryan Adam Merritt (born February 21, 1992) is an American former professional baseball pitcher who played in Major League Baseball (MLB) for the Cleveland Indians in 2016 and 2017.

== Career ==
Merritt was raised in Celina, Texas, and is a graduate of Celina High School, where he lettered in baseball and football. He then attended McLennan Community College.

=== Cleveland Indians ===
The Cleveland Indians selected Merritt in the 16th round of the 2011 Major League Baseball draft. Merritt spent the next five seasons in the Indians' farm system. In 2014, he had a 13–3 win–loss record and a 2.58 earned run average (ERA) for the Carolina Mudcats, and followed that up with 12 wins in 2015 between the Columbus Clippers and the Akron Aeros, the Indians' Triple–A and Double–A affiliates.

The Indians added him to their 40-man roster on November 20, 2014. Merritt started Game 5 of the 2016 American League Championship Series, just his second major league start; he pitched 4 1/3 shutout innings against Toronto, giving up two hits and striking out three. Merritt is one of only two pitchers in MLB history to have started just one game in the regular season before pitching in the postseason, the other being Matt Moore.

On July 13, 2018, Merritt was designated for assignment by the Indians. After clearing waivers, he was outrighted to the minor leagues on July 21. He elected free agency following the season on November 2.

=== Tampa Bay Rays ===
On November 14, 2018, Merritt signed a minor league deal with the Tampa Bay Rays. He spent the 2019 season with the Durham Bulls, the Rays' Triple–A affiliate, and had a 7.04 ERA in 27 games. Merritt elected free agency following the season on November 4, 2019.
