= Cody Allen =

American baseball player (born 1988)

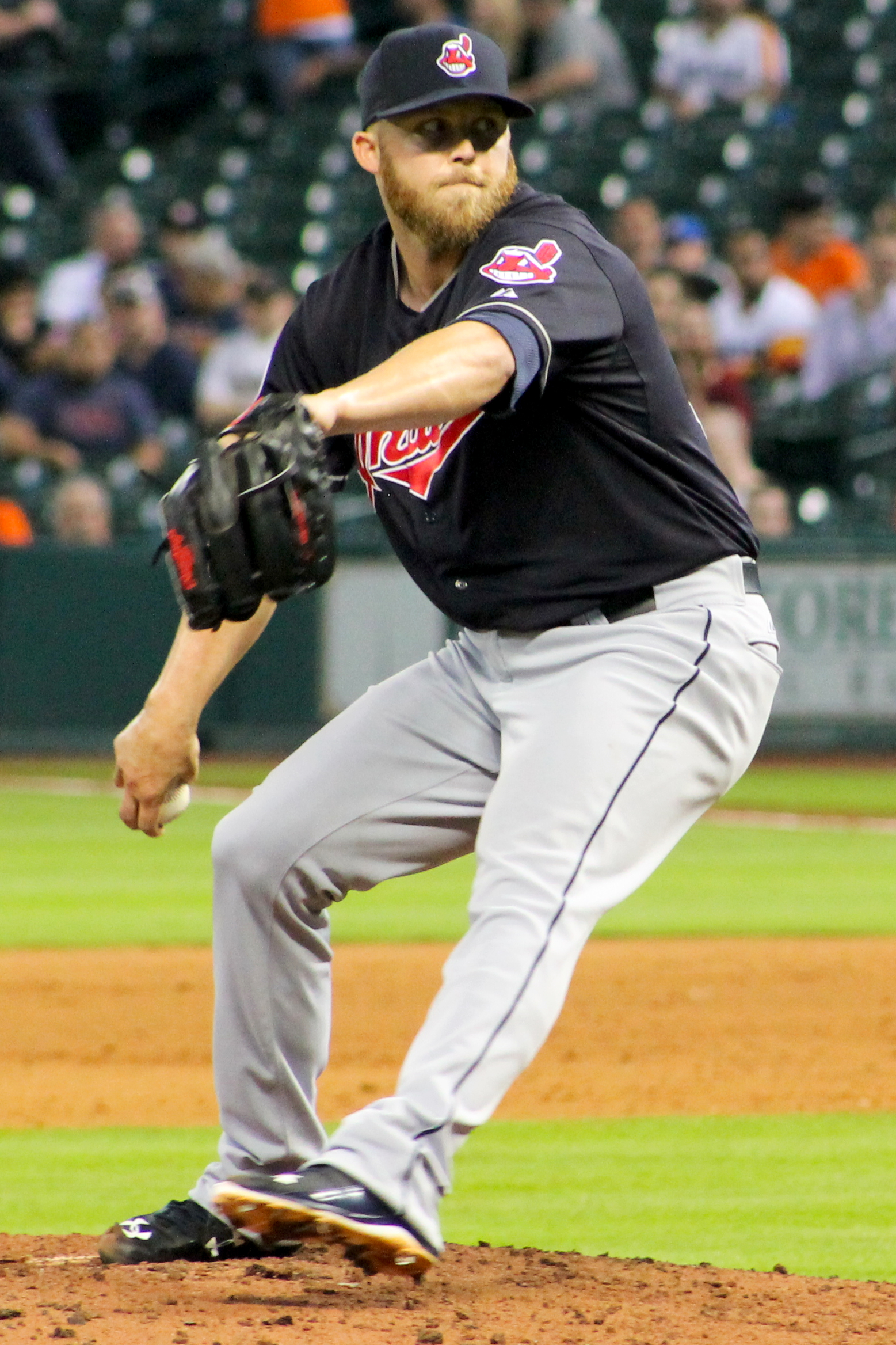
- Allen with the Cleveland Indians in 2015
- Pitcher
- Born: November 20, 1988 (age 37); Orlando, Florida, U.S.
- Batted: Right Threw: Right

MLB debut
- July 20, 2012, for the Cleveland Indians

Last MLB appearance
- June 14, 2019, for the Los Angeles Angels

MLB statistics
- Win–loss record: 24–31
- Earned run average: 3.14
- Strikeouts: 593
- Saves: 153
- Stats at Baseball Reference

Teams
- Cleveland Indians (2012–2018); Los Angeles Angels (2019)

Cody Edward Allen (born November 20, 1988) is an American former professional baseball relief pitcher. He played in Major League Baseball (MLB) for the Cleveland Indians from 2012 to 2018 and the Los Angeles Angels in 2019.

== Early life ==
Allen is the son of Craig and Billie Allen. He played high school baseball and was the quarterback on the football team at William R. Boone High School in Orlando, Florida.

== College career ==
He played college baseball for the University of Central Florida, St. Petersburg College, and High Point University. He played summer college baseball for the Bethesda Big Train in 2008 and 2010. The Cleveland Indians selected him in the 16th round of the 2010 MLB draft, but he opted not to sign.

== Professional career ==
=== Draft and minor leagues ===
The Indians selected Allen in the 23rd round of the 2011 MLB draft. Allen signed with Cleveland and spent 2011 with four teams in the Indians' farm system, but spent the majority of the season with the Mahoning Valley Scrappers of the Class A-Short Season New York-Penn League, pitching to a 3–1 win–loss record with a 2.14 earned run average (ERA) in 14 games. Between the four teams, he was 5–1 with a 1.65 ERA, and 75 strikeouts in 54.2 innings, averaging 12.3 strikeouts per 9 innings.

The following year he spent most of the season with the Columbus Clippers of the Class AAA International League, going 3–2 with a 2.27 ERA in 24 games. Pitching for three minor league teams, he was 3–2 with three saves and a 1.87 ERA, and 53 strikeouts in 43.1 innings, averaging 11.0 strikeouts per 9 innings. He was named the Cleveland Indians' Minor League Pitcher of the Year after the season. After the 2012 season Baseball America ranked him the 5th-best prospect and best curveball in the Indians organization, and the 13th best-prospect in the International League.

=== Cleveland Indians (2012–2018) ===
On July 20, 2012, Allen made his Major League debut for the Cleveland Indians after being called up from Columbus He pitched an inning of relief giving up two walks, no runs, no hits, and one strikeout. He struck out Baltimore Orioles third baseman Mark Reynolds for his first career strikeout.

In 2013, Allen went 6–1 with a 2.43 ERA and 88 strikeouts in 70.1 innings, averaging 11.3 strikeouts per 9 innings. His 77 games pitched was second in the American League, trailing only Joel Peralta's 80 (and 2nd all-time for any Indians pitcher), and he was 2nd in the league in errors committed by a pitcher (3), and 8th in wild pitches (9). He tied for 6th in the 2013 BBWAA AL Rookie of the Year voting.

After multiple struggles by closer John Axford early in the 2014 season, Allen was moved into the closer role. Allen finished the season with 76 appearances (again 2nd in the American League; tied for 4th all-time for any Indians pitcher), a 6–4 record with a 2.07 ERA, 91 strikeouts (8th-most in a single-season by an Indians reliever), and 24 saves (9th) in 69 2/3 innings, averaging 11.8 strikeouts per 9 innings.

For the 2015 season, Allen pitched in 70 games (8th in the AL), leading the American League with 58 games finished, while recording 34 saves (6th), 99 strikeouts (2nd among AL relievers), and a 2.99 ERA in 69 1/3 innings, averaging 12.9 strikeouts per 9 innings.

In 2016, he had 32 saves (7th in the AL) in 35 save opportunities, going 3–5 with a 2.51 ERA. He struck out 87 batters (8th among AL relievers) in 68 innings, averaging 11.5 strikeouts per 9 innings. Allen did not allow a run throughout 13 2/3 innings that postseason, and recorded 6 saves.

In 2017, he had 30 saves (6th in the AL) in 34 save opportunities, finishing the season with a 3–7 record and a 2.94 ERA. He struck out 92 batters (9th-most by an AL reliever) in 67 1/3 innings, averaging 12.3 strikeouts per 9 innings.

With his 141st career save in July 2018, Allen broke Bob Wickman's franchise record for saves. Allen lost his closer role to Brad Hand after struggling in the month of August. He ended the season with 27 saves (6th in the AL) in 32 save chances in 70 appearances, as he was 4–6 with a 4.70 ERA, with 80 strikeouts in 67 innings, averaging 10.7 strikeouts per 9 innings. He gave up the longest home runs of any pitcher in major league baseball in 2018, at 495 feet. Through 2018, his 149 career saves were 9th of all major league active pitchers, topped all major league pitchers under 30 years of age, and topped all Cleveland Indians pitchers ever. He became a free agent after the 2018 season.

=== Los Angeles Angels (2019) ===
On January 20, 2019, Allen signed a one-year, $8.5 million contract with the Los Angeles Angels. He began the season as the Angels closer, going 4/4 for the first couple of weeks of the season despite control issues. He was removed of the closer role on April 24 and later was placed on the injured list with a lumbar strain. He was designated for assignment on June 15 after compiling a 6.26 ERA in 25 games, and was released on June 18.

=== Later career ===
On June 22, 2019, the Minnesota Twins signed Allen to a $500,000 minor league contract for the remainder of the 2019 season. He was released on July 31, 2019. In 11 games, two starts, 12 innings pitched between High-A Fort Myers Miracle and Triple-A Rochester Red Wings he went 0–2 with a 2.25 ERA and 11 strikeouts.

On February 7, 2020, Allen signed a minor league deal with the Texas Rangers. The Rangers released Allen on July 24. On July 31, Allen signed a minor league contract with the Chicago Cubs. He was released by the organization on September 3, 2020.

On February 17, 2021, Allen announced his retirement from professional baseball.

== Personal life ==
Allen married Mallory Rundquist in November 2015. The couple have a son, who was born in 2017. His twin brother, Chad, played baseball for the University of West Florida.
