= Shawn Morimando =

American baseball player (born 1992)

Fubon Guardians – No. 44
- Pitcher
- Born: November 20, 1992 (age 33); Canandaigua, New York, U.S.
- Bats: Left Throws: Left

Professional debut
- MLB: July 2, 2016, for the Cleveland Indians
- CPBL: October 31, 2021, for the CTBC Brothers
- KBO: July 27, 2022, for the SSG Landers

MLB statistics (through 2021 season)
- Win–loss record: 0–0
- Earned run average: 10.20
- Strikeouts: 14

CPBL statistics (through 2025 season)
- Win–loss record: 18-17
- Earned run average: 2.88
- Strikeouts: 219

KBO statistics (through 2022 season)
- Win–loss record: 7–1
- Earned run average: 1.67
- Strikeouts: 67
- Stats at Baseball Reference

Teams
- Cleveland Indians (2016); Miami Marlins (2021); CTBC Brothers (2021–2022); SSG Landers (2022); CTBC Brothers (2023–2024); Fubon Guardians (2025–present)

Career highlights and awards
- CPBL: Taiwan Series champion (2021); KBO: Korean Series champion (2022)

Shawn Peter Morimando (born November 20, 1992) is an American professional baseball pitcher for the Fubon Guardians of the Chinese Professional Baseball League (CPBL). He has previously played in Major League Baseball (MLB) for the Cleveland Indians and Miami Marlins, in the CPBL for the CTBC Brothers, and in the KBO League for the SSG Landers.

== Career ==
=== Cleveland Indians ===
Morimando was drafted by the Cleveland Indians in the 19th round of the 2011 Major League Baseball draft out of Ocean Lakes High School in Virginia Beach, Virginia. He signed with the Indians and made his professional debut with the rookie-level Arizona League Indians. He spent 2012 with the Single-A Lake County Captains, posting a 7–6 record and 3.59 ERA with 69 strikeouts. For the 2013 season, Morimando played with the High-A Carolina Mudcats, recording an 8–13 record and 3.73 ERA with 102 strikeouts in 27 appearances. Morimando split the 2014 season between Carolina and Double-A Akron RubberDucks, accumulating a 10–9 record and 3.30 ERA with 108 strikeouts in 28 games between the two affiliates. He returned to Akron for the 2015 season, registering a 10-12 record and 3.18 ERA with 128 strikeouts in 158 2/3 innings of work. On November 20, 2015, the Indians added Morimando to their 40-man roster to protect him from the Rule 5 draft.

On July 2, 2016, Morimando was promoted to the major leagues for the first time, and made his MLB debut. He made two appearances for the Indians, pitching on July 2 against the Toronto Blue Jays and August 5 against the New York Yankees, allowing 6 runs in 4 2/3 innings. Morimando spent the 2017 season with the Triple-A Columbus Clippers, posting a 10–9 record with a 4.41 earned run average (ERA) with 128 strikeouts. After posting a 7.03 ERA through the first five games of the 2018 season, Morimando was released by Cleveland on July 1, 2018.

=== Toronto Blue Jays ===
Morimando signed a minor league deal with the Toronto Blue Jays on July 9, 2018, and pitched in four games for the Buffalo Bisons. He spent the full 2019 season with Buffalo, winning two games and losing five with a 6.01 ERA in 16 games. On November 4, 2019, he elected free agency.

=== Lancaster Barnstormers ===
On May 8, 2020, Morimando signed with the Lancaster Barnstormers of the Atlantic League of Professional Baseball. He did not play a game for the team because of the cancellation of the 2020 ALPB season due to the COVID-19 pandemic and became a free agent after the year.

=== Miami Marlins ===
On February 16, 2021, Morimando signed a minor league contract with the Miami Marlins organization. On May 22, Morimando was selected to the active roster. He was designated for assignment on May 26 after allowing 4 earned runs in 2/3 of an inning. He was outrighted to the Triple-A Jacksonville Jumbo Shrimp on May 31. On July 9, Morimando was re-selected to the active roster. Morimando tossed 5 scoreless innings against the Atlanta Braves, notching five strikeouts and walking four, but he was designated for assignment the next day. He was again outrighted to Jacksonville on July 13. On August 9, Morimando's contract was once again selected by the Marlins. On August 14, Morimando was designated for assignment by the Marlins again. On September 29, the Marlins released Morimando.

=== CTBC Brothers ===
On September 29, 2021, Morimando signed with the CTBC Brothers of the Chinese Professional Baseball League (CPBL). On December 28, 2021, he agreed to a contract with the Brothers for the 2022 season. On July 10, 2022, he was released.

=== SSG Landers ===
On July 11, 2022, Morimando signed with the SSG Landers of the Korea Baseball Organization. He became a free agent following the 2022 season.

=== CTBC Brothers (second stint) ===
On December 25, 2022, Morimando signed with the CTBC Brothers of the CPBL. Morimando made one start for the Brothers in 2023, tossing six scoreless innings with four strikeouts and one walk. On April 20, it was announced that Morimando would undergo season-ending elbow surgery, later specified as Tommy John surgery. The Brothers subsequently extend his contract through 2024.

Morimando spent much of the 2024 campaign in rehabilitation, making one appearance for the Brothers, in which he allowed one run on six hits with three strikeouts over four innings pitched. On August 31, 2024, the Brothers released Morimando.

=== Fubon Guardians ===
On January 10, 2025, Morimando signed with the Fubon Guardians of the Chinese Professional Baseball League. In 23 starts for Fubon, he compiled a 10-10 record and 2.98 ERA with 111 strikeouts over 139 innings of work.

On December 16, 2025, Morimando re-signed with the Guardians on a one-year contract.
