= Bryan Shaw (baseball) =

American baseball player (born 1987)

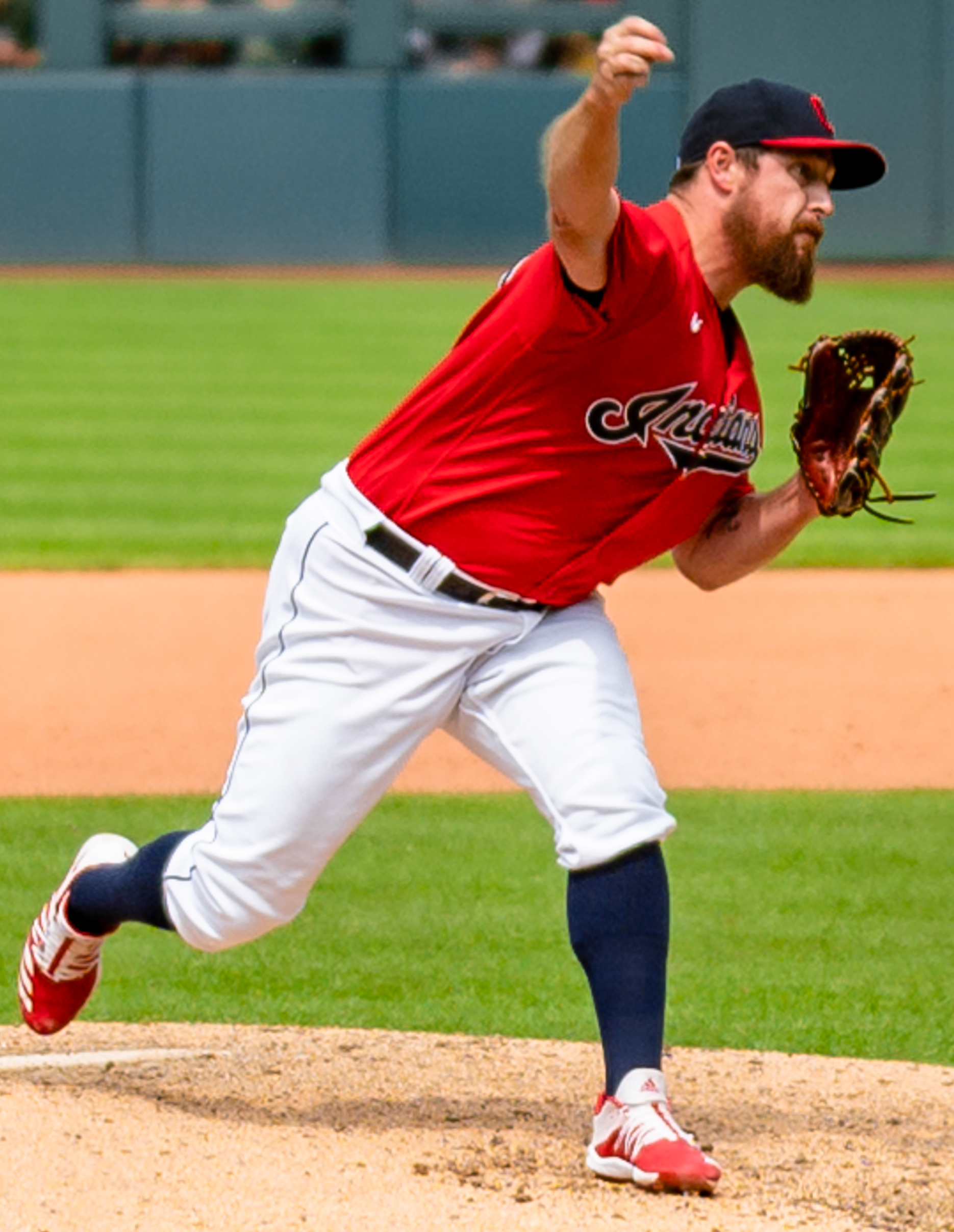
- Shaw with the Cleveland Indians in 2021

Long Island Ducks – No. 39
- Pitcher
- Born: November 8, 1987 (age 38); Livermore, California, U.S.
- Bats: Right Throws: Right

MLB debut
- June 10, 2011, for the Arizona Diamondbacks

MLB statistics (through 2024 season)
- Win–loss record: 43–46
- Earned run average: 3.96
- Strikeouts: 681
- Stats at Baseball Reference

Teams
- Arizona Diamondbacks (2011–2012); Cleveland Indians (2013–2017); Colorado Rockies (2018–2019); Seattle Mariners (2020); Cleveland Indians / Guardians (2021–2022); Chicago White Sox (2023–2024)

Bryan Anthony Shaw (born November 8, 1987) is an American professional baseball pitcher for the Long Island Ducks of the Atlantic League of Professional Baseball. He has previously played in Major League Baseball (MLB) for the Arizona Diamondbacks, Colorado Rockies, Seattle Mariners, Cleveland Indians/Guardians, and Chicago White Sox.

== Early life ==
Shaw was born to Richard, a member of the California Highway Patrol, and Michelle (Shelli) Shaw. He attended Livermore High School in Livermore, California where he played baseball, football, and basketball.

== Career ==
=== Amateur ===
Shaw attended California State University, Long Beach. He played college baseball for the Long Beach State Dirtbags baseball team. Shaw's roommate in college was teammate Vance Worley. In 2007, Shaw played collegiate summer baseball with the Chatham A's of the Cape Cod Baseball League.

=== Arizona Diamondbacks ===
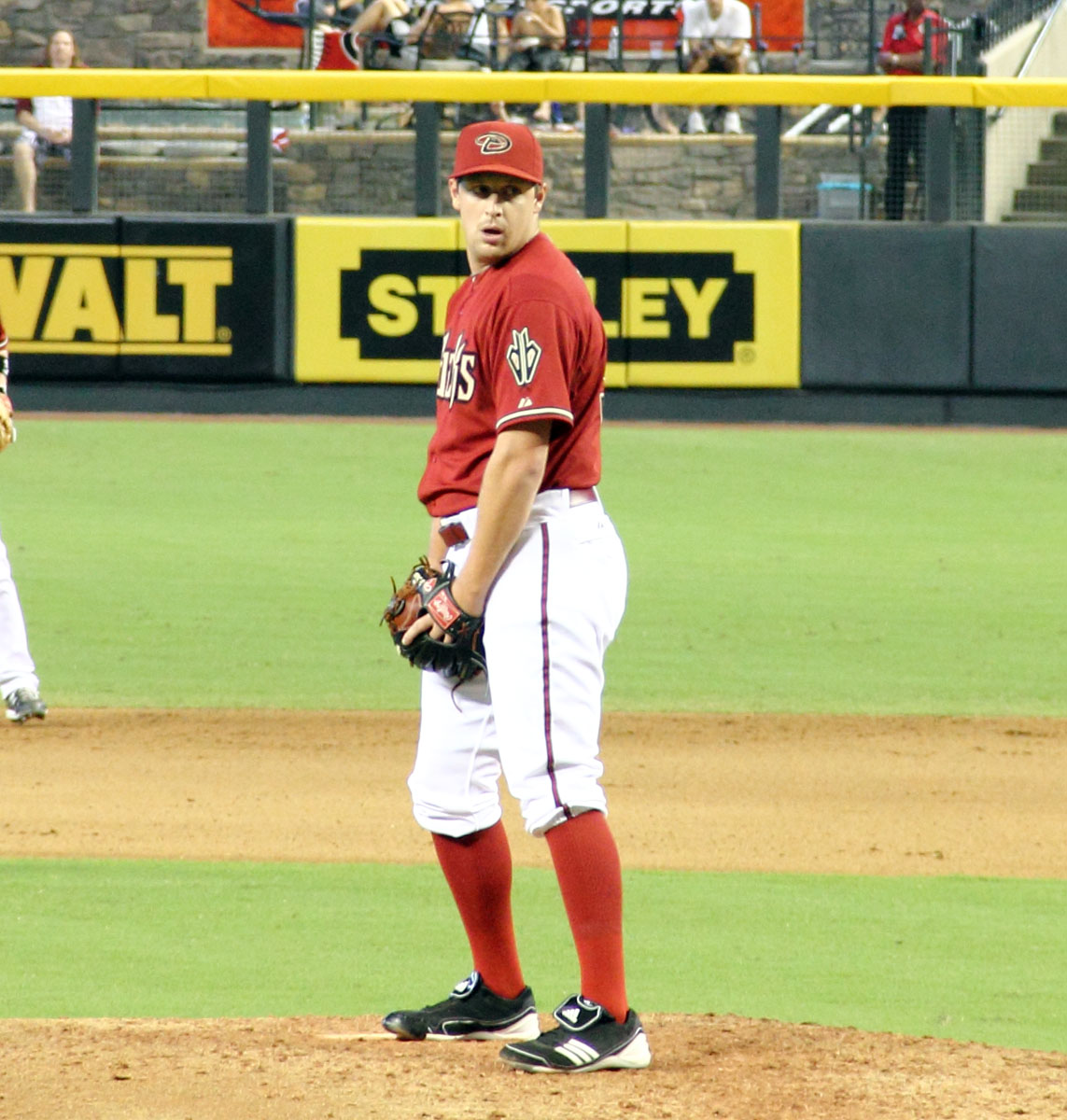
Shaw with the Diamondbacks in 2011

Shaw was selected in the second round of the 2008 Major League Baseball draft by the Arizona Diamondbacks. He was called up by Arizona on June 10, 2011. Shaw made his major league debut that day, coming in for Esmerling Vásquez, who had just given up a leadoff double. Shaw pitched one scoreless inning against the Florida Marlins, giving up two walks and one strikeout, coming against Scott Cousins.

Shaw was recalled from the Diamondbacks' Triple-A affiliate, the Reno Aces on August 11, 2012.

=== Cleveland Indians ===
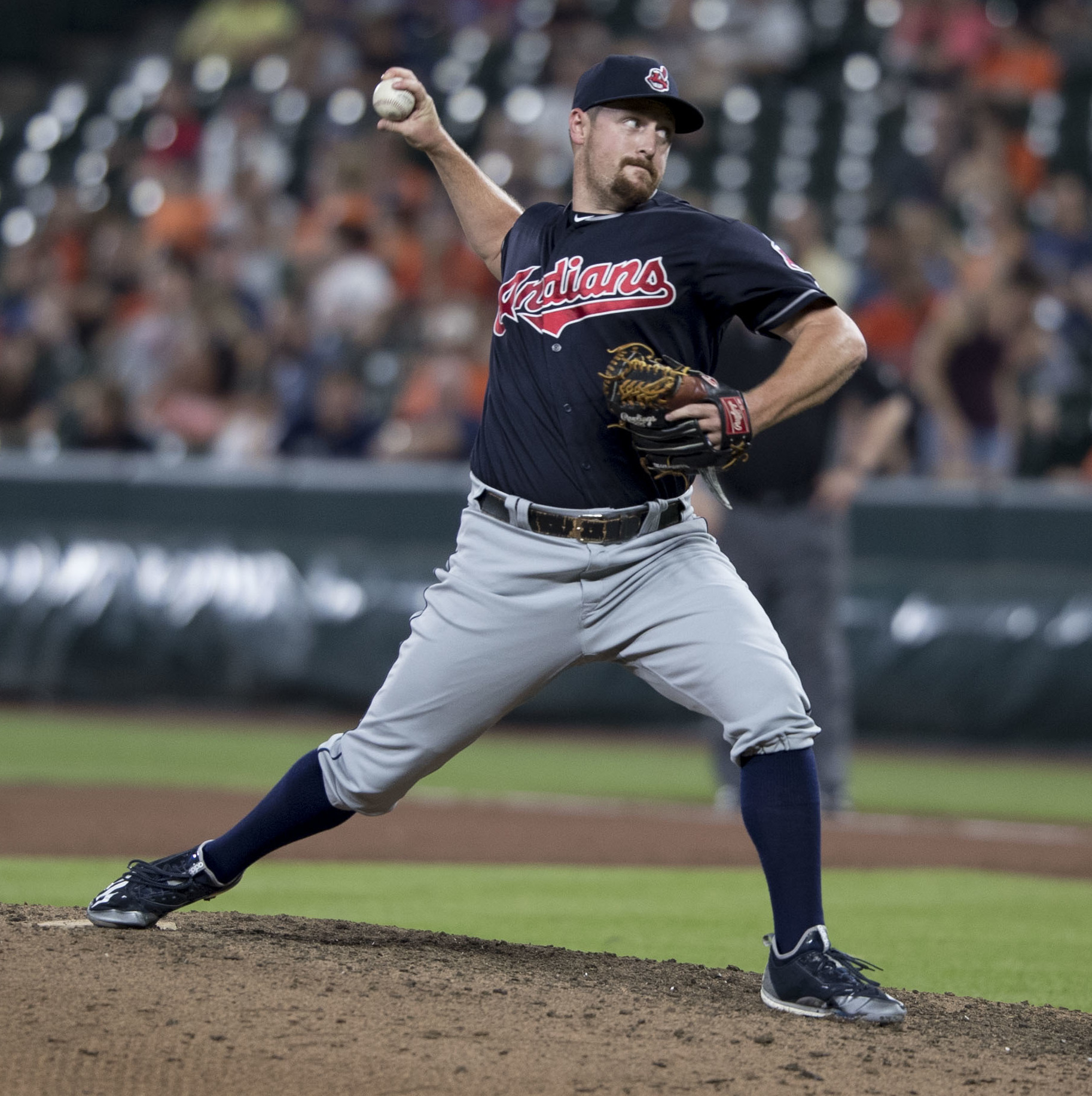
Shaw with the Indians in 2017

On December 11, 2012, Shaw was traded to the Cleveland Indians in a three-team deal involving Trevor Bauer and Shin-Soo Choo. Shaw and his wife, Kristen, had bought a house in Arizona the day before the trade. Shaw made 70 appearances for Cleveland during the 2013 season, compiling a 7-3 record and 3.24 ERA with 73 strikeouts and one save over 75 innings of work.

Shaw made 80 appearances for the Indians in 2014, and in 76 1/3 innings, he finished 5–5 with a 2.59 earned run average (ERA), 64 strikeouts, and two saves. Shaw appeared in more games than any other big league pitcher that year.

Shaw made 74 relief appearances for the Indians during the 2015 campaign, registering a 3-3 record and 2.95 ERA with 54 strikeouts and two saves over 64 innings of work. In 2016, he led the American League (AL) in games pitched again, with 75. Shaw went 2–5 with a 3.24 ERA and helped Cleveland win the pennant. Shaw gave up the game-winning run to the Chicago Cubs in Game 7 of the 2016 World Series, in extra innings.

In 2017, Shaw was 4–6 with a 3.52 ERA in 79 games, and he threw a cutter 87.1% of the time, tops in MLB.

=== Colorado Rockies ===
On December 12, 2017, Shaw signed a three-year, $27 million deal, with the Colorado Rockies. Through 41 appearances in the first half of the season, Shaw endured the worst start to his career, posting an ERA of 7.57 in 35 2/3 innings, surrendering 50 hits. He was placed on the disabled list on June 25 with a calf injury. For the season, Shaw was 4–6 with a 5.93 ERA and 54 strikeouts over 54 2/3 total innings. He threw a cutter 84.36% of the time, tops in MLB.

Shaw made 70 appearances out of the bullpen for the Rockies during the 2019 campaign, registering a 3-2 record and 5.38 ERA with 58 strikeouts and one save across 72 innings of work. As a result of the truncated 2020 campaign due to the COVID-19 pandemic, Shaw did not appear for the Rockies prior to his removal from the roster. He was released alongside Jake McGee prior to the start of the regular season on July 17, 2020.

=== Seattle Mariners ===
Shaw signed a one-year deal with the Seattle Mariners on July 22, 2020. He was optioned to the alternate site on August 7. Shaw was designated for assignment by Seattle on August 15, following the promotions of Taylor Guilbeau and Ljay Newsome. He cleared waivers and was sent outright to the alternate site on August 19. Shaw elected free agency on October 14.

=== Cleveland Indians / Guardians (second stint) ===
On February 3, 2021, Shaw signed a minor league contract with the Cleveland Indians organization and was invited to spring training. The Indians selected Shaw's contract on March 31. In 2021, he led the majors with 81 games pitched and recorded a 3.49 ERA with 71 strikeouts in 77 1/3 innings. Shaw became a free agent on November 3.

On March 25, 2022, Shaw signed a one-year major league contract with the newly named Cleveland Guardians. On July 27, Shaw made the first start of his career, allowing 2 runs on 3 hits with one walk and 2 strikeouts in 2 1/3 innings pitched against the Boston Red Sox. His 732 appearances prior to the start marked the most games pitched prior to a player making his first career start in AL/NL history, surpassing the previous record held by David Robertson (with 670 relief outings). Shaw appeared in 60 games for Cleveland in 2022, posting a 6–2 record and 5.40 ERA with 52 strikeouts in 58 1/3 innings pitched. He was designated for assignment on October 1. After clearing waivers, Shaw cleared waivers and was sent outright to Triple-A Columbus on October 3. He elected free agency following the season on November 10.

=== Chicago White Sox ===
On February 21, 2023, Shaw signed a minor league contract with the Chicago White Sox organization. On March 26, Shaw was released by the White Sox after being informed he would not make the Opening Day roster.

Shaw re-signed with Chicago on a new minor league contract on April 28. In 21 relief appearances with the Triple-A Charlotte Knights, he pitched to a 2–0 record with a 4.03 ERA and 24 strikeouts over 22 1/3 innings. On July 2, his contract was selected by the White Sox following an injury to starter Michael Kopech. In 6 games, he struggled to a 9.39 ERA with 4 strikeouts in 7 2/3 innings of work. On July 22, Shaw was designated for assignment by the White Sox. He cleared waivers and was sent outright to Triple–A Charlotte on July 24. On July 28, Shaw had his contract selected back to the active roster. He became a free agent after the season.

On February 17, 2024, Shaw re–signed with the White Sox on a minor league contract that included an invitation to spring training. On March 27, the White Sox selected Shaw's contract after he made the team's Opening Day roster. He made five appearances for Chicago, posting a 9.00 ERA with four strikeouts across four innings pitched. On April 12, the White Sox designated Shaw for assignment. He elected free agency the following day.

=== Los Angeles Angels ===
On April 17, 2024, Shaw signed a minor league contract with the Los Angeles Angels. In 39 appearances for the Triple–A Salt Lake Bees, he recorded a 4.14 ERA with 34 strikeouts and 7 saves across 41 1/3 innings pitched. Shaw was released by the Angels organization on August 14.

=== Cincinnati Reds ===
On December 20, 2024, Shaw signed a minor league contract with the Cincinnati Reds. In four appearances for the Triple-A Louisville Bats, he struggled to 27.00 ERA with one strikeout over 1 2/3 innings pitched. Shaw was released by the Reds organization on April 18, 2025.

=== Seattle Mariners (second stint) ===
On April 29, 2025, the Seattle Mariners signed Shaw to a minor league contract. In 15 appearances for the Triple-A Tacoma Rainiers, he logged an 0-2 record and 3.29 ERA with 11 strikeouts and one save across 13 2/3 innings pitched. Shaw was released by the Mariners organization on June 17.

=== Long Island Ducks ===
On May 27, 2026, Shaw signed with the Long Island Ducks of the Atlantic League of Professional Baseball.

== Personal life ==
Shaw and his wife, Kristen, have one son together.
