= Josh Tomlin =

American baseball player (born 1984)

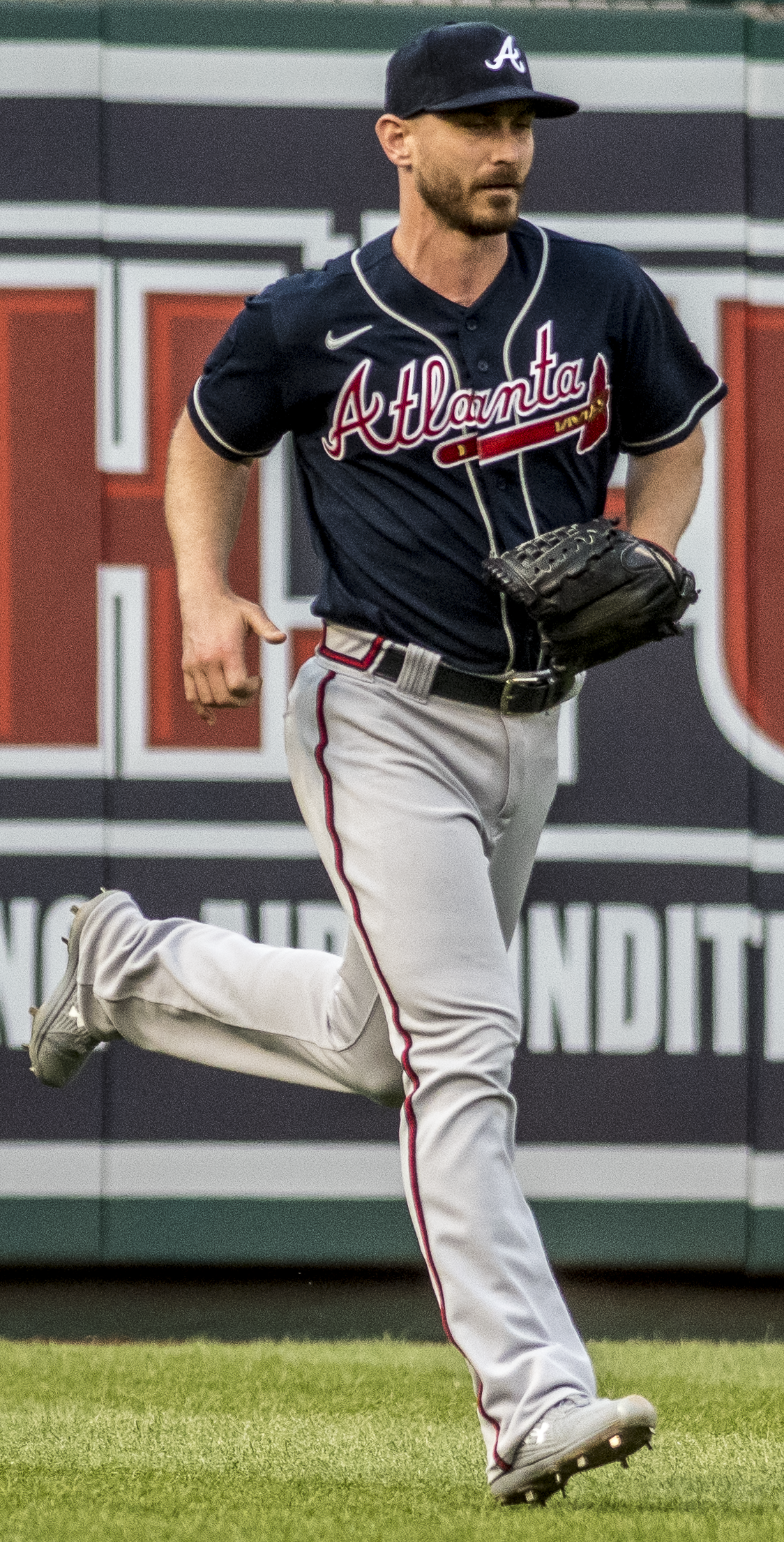
- Tomlin with the Atlanta Braves in 2021
- Pitcher
- Born: October 19, 1984 (age 41); Tyler, Texas, U.S.
- Batted: Right Threw: Right

MLB debut
- July 27, 2010, for the Cleveland Indians

Last MLB appearance
- August 18, 2021, for the Atlanta Braves

MLB statistics
- Win–loss record: 69–56
- Earned run average: 4.77
- Strikeouts: 736
- Stats at Baseball Reference

Teams
- Cleveland Indians (2010–2018); Atlanta Braves (2019–2021)

Joshua Aubry Tomlin (born October 19, 1984) is an American former professional baseball pitcher. He has played in Major League Baseball (MLB) for the Cleveland Indians and Atlanta Braves. Tomlin was drafted by the Indians in the 19th round of the 2006 Major League Baseball draft. He made his MLB debut in 2010. He is known for his low walk rate. He has been to the World Series twice, winning one with the 2021 Atlanta Braves, and losing one with the 2016 Cleveland Indians.

== Career ==
Tomlin was coached by his father until he began playing high school baseball. Tomlin attended Whitehouse High School, Angelina College, and Texas Tech University. He was drafted by the San Diego Padres in the 11th round of the 2005 Major League Baseball draft, but did not sign.

=== Cleveland Indians ===
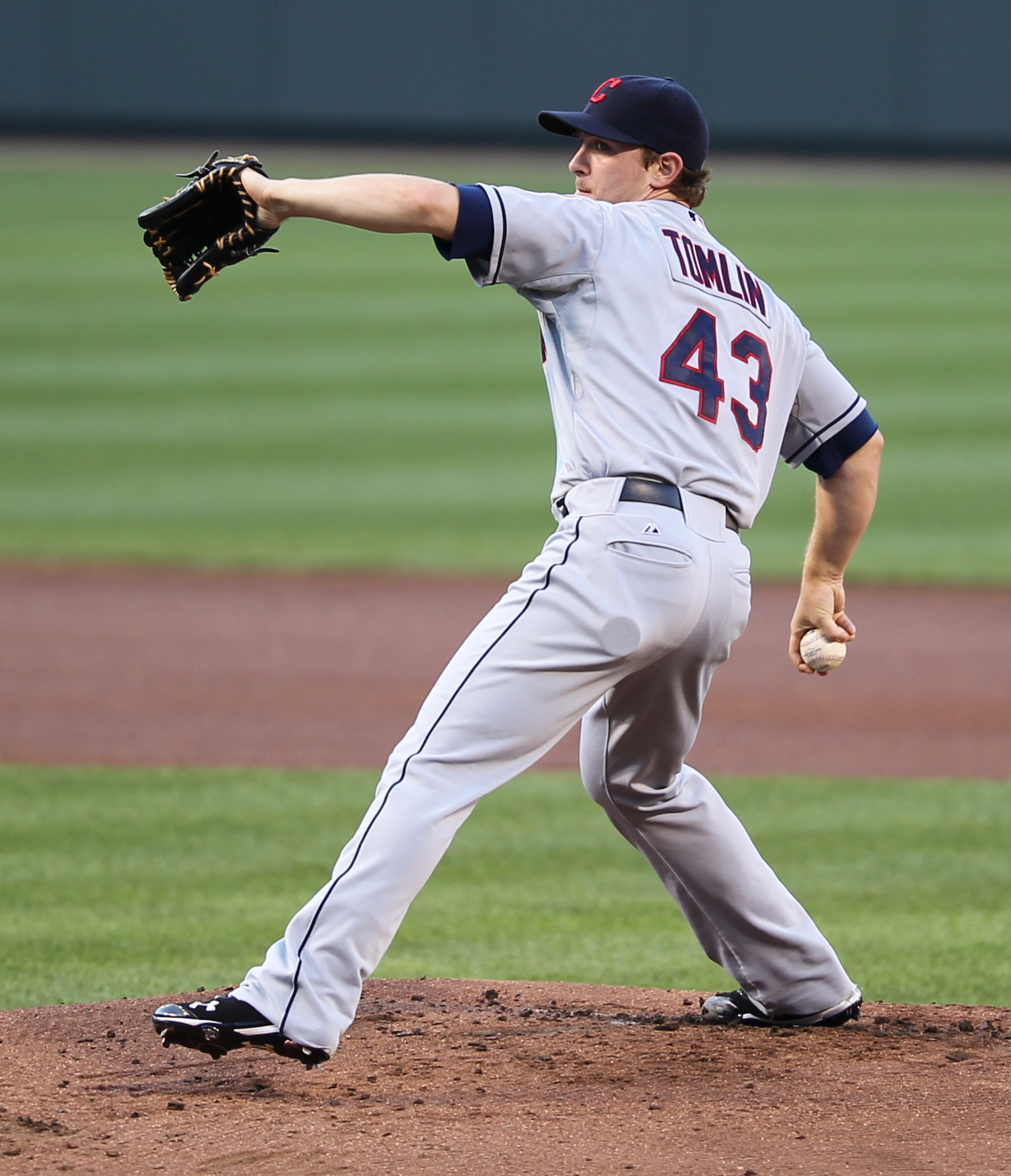
Tomlin with the Cleveland Indians

Tomlin was drafted again by the Cleveland Indians in the 19th round of the 2006 Major League Baseball draft, and did sign. Since 2006, he has played with various minor league baseball teams including the Mahoning Valley Scrappers, Lake County Captains, Kinston Indians, Buffalo Bisons, and Columbus Clippers.

At Columbus, Tomlin went 8–4 with a 2.68 ERA in 20 appearances, including 17 starts. He has an overall minor-league record of 51–24 with a 3.20 ERA.

Tomlin was promoted to the Indians to make his major league debut against the New York Yankees on July 27, 2010, where he outpitched the Yankees' CC Sabathia, earning a 4–1 win. In 12 starts for the Indians, Tomlin went 6-4 with a 4.56 ERA in 73 innings. In 2011, Tomlin pitched most of the season in the Indians rotation, finishing with a record of 12-7 in 26 starts.

On May 7, 2012, Tomlin pitched a no-decision with a career-high eight strikeouts in a win versus the White Sox. The following day Tomlin reported soreness in his wrist and was placed on the 15-day disabled list after undergoing an MRI which revealed inflammation to soft tissue. In July, holding a 5-5 record and 5.45 ERA and recording at least six innings in just 7 of 13 starts (compared to 23 of 26 in all of 2011), Tomlin stated, "Last year, they could count on me to save the bullpen. It's bothered me that I've been like that. It's frustrating." On August 21, 2012, Tomlin underwent Tommy John surgery and was eliminated for the rest of the 2012 season and was expected to miss the entire 2013 season. However, he did pitch in one game on September 12, 2013, when he pitched two shutout innings against the Chicago White Sox in a relief appearance.

Tomlin was called up from AAA Columbus on May 5, 2014, and placed on the Cleveland Indians starting rotation, replacing Carlos Carrasco. On June 28, Tomlin pitched a near perfect game against the Seattle Mariners, striking out 11, walking none, and giving up one hit. The only player to reach base was Kyle Seager, getting a lead off single in the fifth. Tomlin went on to get a complete-game shutout, leading the Indians to a 5-0 victory. He finished the 2014 season appearing in 25 games, 16 of them starts, with a record of 6-9 in 104 innings.

The following season, Tomlin underwent shoulder surgery in April 2015, and started just 10 games for the Indians.

On January 15, 2016, he and the Indians agreed to a one-year deal for the 2016 season worth $2.5 million. Negotiations continued, and 11 days later, another year was added to the contract, for the same $2.5 million base salary. A team option, worth $3 million, was available for the 2018 season. The Indians exercised Tomlin's 2018 option on November 3, 2017. He finished the regular season starting 29 games for the Indians, establishing career highs in every statistical pitching category. He had a very low walk rate, leading the majors with only 1.03 bases on balls per 9 innings pitched. He also started 4 games for the Indians in their postseason route to the World Series, going 2–1 with a 4.58 ERA.

In 2017, he had a record of 10-9 with a 4.98 ERA in 26 starts.

In 2018, Tomlin began the season as the Indians fourth starter, but after struggling through six starts, he was moved to the bullpen. Tomlin finished with a career-worst 6.14 ERA in 32 appearances, 9 starts. He elected free agency on October 29, 2018.

=== Atlanta Braves ===
In January 2019, Tomlin trained at Driveline Baseball to improve his pitching delivery. On February 7, Tomlin signed a minor league deal with the Milwaukee Brewers that included an invitation to spring training. Tomlin signed a minor league contract with the Atlanta Braves on March 21, a day after the Brewers released him.

Tomlin served mainly as a multi-inning reliever for the Braves, going 2–1 with a 3.74 ERA and 37 strikeouts over 79 1/3 innings (51G, 1GS). His 0.79 BB/9 was the lowest in MLB (min. 30 IP). Tomlin pitched in two games in the NLDS against the St. Louis Cardinals. Tomlin retired 10 of the 12 batters he faced, not allowing a run over 2 2/3 innings. Tomlin signed a minor league deal to return to the organization on February 12, 2020. Tomlin had his contract selected to the 40-man roster on July 18. In 2020, he was 2-2 with a 4.76 ERA, in 39.2 innings that included five starts.

On November 11, 2020, Tomlin and the Braves agreed on a one-year contract worth $1 million that included a team option for the following season. Tomlin struggled to a 6.57 ERA in 35 appearances for Atlanta in 2021, but won his first ever World Series ring when the Braves defeated the Houston Astros in 2021 World Series. On November 6, 2021, the Braves declined the option on Tomlin's contract for the 2022 season, and became a free agent.

=== Pitching style ===
Tomlin threw five pitches. He had a four-seam fastball (87–91 mph), a two-seam fastball (86–90), a cut fastball (83–88), a curveball (74–77), and a changeup (low 80s). The changeup was used against left-handed hitters, and Tomlin used his curveball often in two-strike counts. Tomlin walked very few hitters, averaging only 1.6 walks per 9 innings through his first 333 innings. He had the lowest walk rate, 1.1 per 9 innings, in the Major Leagues in 2011. From 2013 through September 8, 2017, Tomlin had the lowest walk rate among all major league pitchers, walking only 1.07 batters per 9 innings.

== Personal life ==
Josh Tomlin's mother Elana owned a barbershop. His father Jerry was a plumber and later worked at power plants. Jerry was diagnosed with arteriovenous malformation in August 2016.

Tomlin and his wife Carlie married in January 2014. The couple has two daughters. They reside in Tyler, Texas.

== See also ==
- List of World Series starting pitchers
