= 2011 Cleveland Indians season =

2011 Cleveland Indians
- League: American League
- Division: Central
- Ballpark: Progressive Field
- City: Cleveland, Ohio
- Record: 80–82 (.494)
- Divisional place: 2nd
- Owners: Larry Dolan
- General managers: Chris Antonetti
- Managers: Manny Acta
- Television: SportsTime Ohio · WKYC (Matt Underwood, Rick Manning, Mike Hargrove)
- Radio: WTAM · WMMS; Cleveland Indians Radio Network (Tom Hamilton, Jim Rosenhaus, Mike Hegan)

The 2011 Cleveland Indians season marked the 111th season for the franchise, with the Indians improving on their fourth-place finish in the American League Central in 2010 by finishing in second place in 2011. The team played all of its home games at Progressive Field.

During the offseason, franchise legend and Hall of Fame pitcher Bob Feller died on December 15, 2010. In honor of Feller, the Indians implemented many tributes to their former ace, including all players wearing No. 19 (Feller's jersey number retired by the club in 1957) during pre-game introductions on Opening Day, an outline patch of Feller's pitching motion sewn onto the team's jerseys and to be worn throughout the season, and the press-box seat used by Feller upon retirement made into a memorial.

The 2011 season started off promising for the Cleveland Indians, as they raced out to a 30–15 start (7 games ahead of 2nd place Detroit), but would go 50-67 the rest of the season to slip out of first place, postseason contention, and to another losing record. Still, the Indians' win–loss record improved 11 games from the year before.

== Season standings ==
=== American League Central ===
AL Central
Team	W	L	Pct.	GB	Home	Road
Detroit Tigers	95	67	.586	—	50‍–‍31	45‍–‍36
Cleveland Indians	80	82	.494	15	44‍–‍37	36‍–‍45
Chicago White Sox	79	83	.488	16	36‍–‍45	43‍–‍38
Kansas City Royals	71	91	.438	24	40‍–‍41	31‍–‍50
Minnesota Twins	63	99	.389	32	33‍–‍48	30‍–‍51

=== American League Wild Card ===
Division winners
Team	W	L	Pct.
New York Yankees	97	65	.599
Texas Rangers	96	66	.593
Detroit Tigers	95	67	.586

Wild Card team (Top team qualifies for postseason)
Team	W	L	Pct.	GB
Tampa Bay Rays	91	71	.562	—
Boston Red Sox	90	72	.556	1
Los Angeles Angels of Anaheim	86	76	.531	5
Toronto Blue Jays	81	81	.500	10
Cleveland Indians	80	82	.494	11
Chicago White Sox	79	83	.488	12
Oakland Athletics	74	88	.457	17
Kansas City Royals	71	91	.438	20
Baltimore Orioles	69	93	.426	22
Seattle Mariners	67	95	.414	24
Minnesota Twins	63	99	.389	28

== Record vs opponents ==
2011 American League record Source: MLB Standings Grid – 2011
Team	BAL	BOS	CWS	CLE	DET	KC	LAA	MIN	NYY	OAK	SEA	TB	TEX	TOR	NL
Baltimore	–	8–10	4–4	2–5	5–5	5–4	3–6	6–2	5–13	4–5	4–2	9–9	1–5	6–12	7–11
Boston	10–8	–	2–4	4–6	5–1	5–3	6–2	5–2	12–6	6–2	5–4	6–12	4–6	10–8	10–8
Chicago	4–4	4–2	–	11–7	5–13	7–11	2–6	9–9	2–6	6–4	7–2	4–4	4–4	3–4	11–7
Cleveland	5–2	6–4	7–11	–	6–12	12–6	3–6	11–7	3–4	5–2	5–4	2–4	1–9	3–4	11–7
Detroit	5–5	1–5	13–5	12–6	–	11–7	3–4	14–4	4–3	5–5	4–6	6–1	6–3	4–2	7–11
Kansas City	4–5	3–5	11–7	6–12	7–11	–	7–3	8–10	3–3	4–5	5–3	2–5	2–6	4–3	5–13
Los Angeles	6–3	2–6	6–2	6–3	4–3	3–7	–	6–3	4–5	8–11	12–7	4–4	7–12	5–5	13–5
Minnesota	2–6	2–5	9–9	7–11	4–14	10–8	3–6	–	2–6	4–4	3–5	3–7	5–3	1–5	8–10
New York	13–5	6–12	6–2	4–3	3–4	3–3	5–4	6–2	–	6–3	5–4	9–9	7–2	11–7	13–5
Oakland	5–4	2–6	4–6	2–5	5–5	5–4	11–8	4–4	3–6	–	9–10	5–2	6–13	5–5	8–10
Seattle	2–4	4–5	2–7	4–5	6–4	3–5	7–12	5–3	4–5	10–9	–	4–6	4–15	3–6	9–9
Tampa Bay	9–9	12–6	4–4	4–2	1–6	5–2	4–4	7–3	9–9	2–5	6–4	–	4–5	12–6	12–6
Texas	5–1	6–4	4–4	9–1	3–6	6–2	12–7	3–5	2–7	13–6	15–4	5–4	–	4–6	9–9
Toronto	12–6	8–10	4–3	4–3	2–4	3–4	5–5	5–1	7–11	5–5	6–3	6–12	6–4	–	8–10

- Source: MLB Standings Grid – 2011

== Roster ==
2011 Cleveland Indians
Roster
Pitchers: 55 Fausto Carmona; 59 Carlos Carrasco; 37 Chad Durbin; 39 Justin Germano; 58 Jeanmar Gómez; 50 Nick Hagadone; 56 Frank Herrmann; 31 David Huff; 30 Ubaldo Jiménez; 45 Josh Judy; 34 Corey Kluber; 63 Justin Masterson; 57 Zach McAllister; 54 Chris Perez; 53 Rafael Pérez; 52 Vinnie Pestano; 44 Zach Putnam; 46 Tony Sipp; 38 Joe Smith; 51 Mitch Talbot; 43 Josh Tomlin; 32 Alex White	Catchers: 6 Lou Marson; 41 Carlos Santana; Infielders: 13 Asdrúbal Cabrera; 20 Orlando Cabrera; 27 Lonnie Chisenhall; 16 Jason Donald; 8 Adam Everett; 9 Jack Hannahan; 22 Jason Kipnis; 7 Matt LaPorta; 35 Cord Phelps; 25 Jim Thome; 1,2 Luis Valbuena	Outfielders: 23 Michael Brantley; 28 Travis Buck; 12 Ezequiel Carrera; 17 Shin-Soo Choo; 4 Trevor Crowe; 47 Shelley Duncan; 1 Kosuke Fukudome; 32 Jerad Head; 26 Austin Kearns; 24 Grady Sizemore; Other batters: 48 Travis Hafner	Manager: 11 Manny Acta; Coaches: 15 Sandy Alomar Jr. (first base); 49 Tim Belcher (pitching); 64 Armando Camacaro (bullpen catcher); 40 Bruce Fields (hitting); 44 Jon Nunnally (hitting); 36 Scott Radinsky (bullpen); 10 Steve Smith (third base); 29 Tim Tolman (bench)

== Game log ==
2011 Game Log
April: 18–8 (Home: 12–2, Road: 6–6)

#	Date	Opponent	Score	Win	Loss	Save	Attendance	Record
1	April 1	White Sox	15–10	Buehrle (1–0)	Carmona (0–1)		41,721	0–1
2	April 2	White Sox	8–3	Jackson (1–0)	Carrasco (0–1)		9,853	0–2
3	April 3	White Sox	7–1	Masterson (1–0)	Danks (0–1)		8,726	1–2
4	April 5	Red Sox	3–1	Tomlin (1–0)	Beckett (0–1)	C. Perez (1)	9,025	2–2
5	April 6	Red Sox	8–4	R. Pérez (1–0)	Matsuzaka (0–1)		9,523	3–2
6	April 7	Red Sox	1–0	R. Pérez (2–0)	Bard (0–2)	C. Perez (2)	10,594	4–2
7	April 8	@ Mariners	12–3	Carrasco (1–1)	Vargas (0–1)		45,727	5–2
8	April 9	@ Mariners	2–1	Masterson (2–0)	Fister (0–2)	C. Perez (3)	30,309	6–2
9	April 10	@ Mariners	6–4	Tomlin (2–0)	Bédard (0–2)	C. Perez (4)	21,128	7–2
10	April 11	@ Angels	4–0	Talbot (1–0)	Chatwood (0–1)		32,864	8–2
11	April 12	@ Angels	2–0	Haren (3–0)	Carmona (0–2)		43,529	8–3
12	April 13	@ Angels	4–3 (12)	Takahashi (1–0)	Durbin (0–1)		31,049	8–4
13	April 15	Orioles	8–2	Masterson (3–0)	Britton (2–1)		16,346	9–4
14	April 16	Orioles	8–3	Tomlin (3–0)	Guthrie (1–2)		10,714	10–4
15	April 17	Orioles	4–2	Carmona (1–2)	Bergesen (0–2)	C. Perez (5)	13,017	11–4
16	April 18	@ Royals	7–3 (10)	Smith (1–0)	Collins (1–1)		12,214	12–4
17	April 19	@ Royals	5–4	Chen (3–0)	Gómez (0–1)	Soria (5)	10,506	12–5
18	April 20	@ Royals	7–5	Masterson (4–0)	Hochevar (2–2)	C. Perez (6)	10,080	13–5
19	April 21	@ Royals	3–2	Crow (2–0)	C. Perez (0–1)		9,279	13–6
	April 22	@ Twins	Postponed (rain); Makeup: July 18 (Game 1)					
20	April 23	@ Twins	10–3	Duensing (2–0)	Carmona (1–3)		39,459	13–7
21	April 24	@ Twins	4–3	Pavano (2–2)	R. Pérez (2–1)	Capps (4)	39,388	13–8
22	April 26	Royals	9–4	Masterson (5–0)	Hochevar (2–3)		9,650	14–8
23	April 27	Royals	7–2	Tomlin (4–0)	Francis (0–3)		9,722	15–8
24	April 28	Royals	8–2	Carmona (2–3)	Davies (1–3)		9,076	16–8
25	April 29	Tigers	9–5	C. Perez (1–1)	Benoit (0–1)		15,568	17–8
26	April 30	Tigers	3–2 (13)	Sipp (1–0)	Villarreal (1–1)		26,433	18–8

May: 14–12 (Home: 7–4, Road: 7–8)

#	Date	Opponent	Score	Win	Loss	Save	Attendance	Record
27	May 1	Tigers	5–4	Durbin (1–1)	Benoit (0–2)	C. Perez (7)	14,164	19–8
28	May 3	@ Athletics	4–1	Carmona (3–3)	Fuentes (1–3)	C. Perez (8)	10,135	20–8
29	May 4	@ Athletics	3–1	Cahill (5–0)	Tomlin (4–1)	Balfour (1)	13,872	20–9
30	May 5	@ Athletics	4–3 (12)	Durbin (2–1)	Breslow (0–2)	C. Perez (9)	14,353	21–9
31	May 6	@ Angels	2–1 (11)	Rodney (1–1)	Germano (0–1)		36,447	21–10
32	May 7	@ Angels	4–3	White (1–0)	Weaver (6–2)	C. Perez (10)	37,684	22–10
33	May 8	@ Angels	6–5	Rodney (2–1)	Smith (1–1)	Walden (6)	40,124	22–11
34	May 10	Rays	5–4	C. Perez (2–1)	Peralta (1–2)		13,551	23–11
35	May 11	Rays	8–2	Price (5–3)	Carrasco (1–2)		17,741	23–12
36	May 12	Rays	7–4	Shields (4–1)	Masterson (5–1)		18,107	23–13
37	May 13	Mariners	5–4	Sipp (2–0)	League (0–4)		33,774	24–13
	May 14	Mariners	Postponed (rain); Makeup: August 23 (Game 1)					
	May 15	Mariners	Postponed (rain); Makeup: September 19					
38	May 16	@ Royals	19–1	Tomlin (5–1)	Davies (1–6)		12,242	25–13
39	May 17	@ Royals	7–3	Carrasco (2–2)	O'Sullivan (2–3)		17,712	26–13
40	May 18	@ White Sox	1–0	Peavy (1–0)	Masterson (5–2)		18,580	26–14
41	May 19	@ White Sox	8–2	Floyd (5–3)	Carmona (3–4)		22,077	26–15
42	May 20	Reds	5–4	Pestano (1–0)	Bray (1–1)	C. Perez (11)	31,622	27–15
43	May 21	Reds	2–1	Tomlin (6–1)	Bailey (3–1)	C. Perez (12)	40,631	28–15
44	May 22	Reds	12–4	Carrasco (3–2)	Vólquez (3–2)		26,833	29–15
45	May 23	Red Sox	3–2	Smith (2–1)	Bard (1–4)	C. Perez (13)	19,225	30–15
46	May 24	Red Sox	4–2	Beckett (4–1)	Carmona (3–5)	Papelbon (9)	23,752	30–16
47	May 25	Red Sox	14–2	Lester (7–1)	Talbot (1–1)		26,408	30–17
48	May 27	@ Rays	5–0	Price (6–4)	Tomlin (6–2)		16,800	30–18
49	May 28	@ Rays	7–3	Carrasco (4–2)	Shields (5–3)	C. Perez (14)	24,717	31–18
50	May 29	@ Rays	7–0	Hellickson (6–3)	Masterson (5–3)		23,898	31–19
51	May 30	@ Blue Jays	11–1	Reyes (1–4)	Carmona (3–6)		12,902	31–20
52	May 31	@ Blue Jays	6–3	Talbot (2–1)	Morrow (2–3)		14,556	32–20

June: 10–17 (Home: 5–8, Away: 5–9)

#	Date	Opponent	Score	Win	Loss	Save	Attendance	Record
53	June 1	@ Blue Jays	13–9	Tomlin (7–2)	Drabek (3–4)		15,397	33–20
54	June 2	Rangers	7–4	Kirkman (1–0)	Carrasco (4–3)	Feliz (12)	15,336	33–21
55	June 3	Rangers	11–2	Ogando (6–0)	Masterson (5–4)		27,458	33–22
56	June 4	Rangers	4–0	Holland (5–1)	Carmona (3–7)		30,130	33–23
57	June 5	Rangers	2–0	Wilson (6–3)	Talbot (2–2)	Feliz (13)	20,621	33–24
58	June 6	Twins	6–4	Baker (3–4)	Tomlin (7–3)	Capps (8)	15,278	33–25
59	June 7	Twins	1–0	Carrasco (5–3)	Liriano (3–6)	C. Perez (15)	15,498	34–25
60	June 8	Twins	3–2 (10)	Capps (2–3)	C. Perez (2–2)	Dumatrait (1)	15,849	34–26
61	June 10	@ Yankees	11–7	Nova (5–4)	Carmona (3–8)		45,679	34–27
62	June 11	@ Yankees	4–0	Colón (5–3)	Talbot (2–3)		47,048	34–28
63	June 12	@ Yankees	9–1	García (5–5)	Tomlin (7–4)		46,791	34–29
64	June 13	@ Yankees	1–0	Carrasco (6–3)	Burnett (6–5)	C. Perez (16)	43,551	35–29
65	June 14	@ Tigers	4–0	Verlander (8–3)	Masterson (5–5)		28,128	35–30
66	June 15	@ Tigers	6–4	Carmona (4–8)	Furbush (1–1)	C. Perez (17)	26,711	36–30
67	June 16	@ Tigers	6–2	Scherzer (9–2)	Talbot (2–4)		37,437	36–31
68	June 17	Pirates	5–1	Tomlin (8–4)	Correia (8–6)		38,549	37–31
69	June 18	Pirates	5–1	Carrasco (7–3)	Maholm (3–8)		31,865	38–31
70	June 19	Pirates	5–2 (11)	Sipp (3–0)	Wood (0–1)		30,023	39–31
71	June 20	Rockies	8–7	Lindstrom (2–1)	Carmona (4–9)	Street (21)	15,224	39–32
72	June 21	Rockies	4–3	Belisle (5–2)	C. Perez (2–3)	Street (22)	15,877	39–33
73	June 22	Rockies	4–3	Tomlin (9–4)	Hammel (4–7)	C. Perez (18)	17,568	40–33
74	June 24	@ Giants	4–3	Casilla (1–1)	Carrasco (7–4)	Wilson (22)	41,690	40–34
75	June 25	@ Giants	1–0	Cain (7–4)	Masterson (5–6)	Wilson (23)	42,130	40–35
76	June 26	@ Giants	3–1	Bumgarner (4–9)	Carmona (4–10)	Affeldt (2)	41,978	40–36
77	June 27	@ Diamondbacks	5–4	R. Pérez (3–1)	Putz (1–2)	C. Perez (19)	25,726	41–36
78	June 28	@ Diamondbacks	6–4	Castillo (1–0)	Sipp (3–1)		27,076	41–37
79	June 29	@ Diamondbacks	6–2	Carrasco (8–4)	Duke (1–3)		26,876	42–37

July: 11–15 (Home: 5–10, Road: 6–5)

#	Date	Opponent	Score	Win	Loss	Save	Attendance	Record
80	July 1	@ Reds	8–2	Masterson (6–6)	Arroyo (7–7)		40,440	43–37
81	July 2	@ Reds	3–1	Herrmann (1–0)	Bailey (3–3)	Pestano (1)	41,580	44–37
82	July 3	@ Reds	7–5	Leake (8–4)	Talbot (2–5)	Cordero (17)	34,948	44–38
83	July 4	Yankees	6–3	Tomlin (10–4)	Burnett (8–7)	C. Perez (20)	40,676	45–38
84	July 5	Yankees	9–2	Sabathia (12–4)	Carrasco (8–5)		30,100	45–39
85	July 6	Yankees	5–3	Masterson (7–6)	Hughes (0–2)	C. Perez (21)	31,926	46–39
86	July 7	Blue Jays	5–4	Sipp (4–1)	Pérez (1–2)		18,816	47–39
87	July 8	Blue Jays	11–7	Reyes (4–7)	Talbot (2–6)		25,835	47–40
88	July 9	Blue Jays	5–4 (10)	Rauch (3–3)	C. Perez (2–4)	Camp (1)	27,661	47–41
89	July 10	Blue Jays	7–1	Cecil (2–4)	Carrasco (8–6)		21,148	47–42
90	July 14	@ Orioles	8–4	Masterson (8–6)	Guthrie (3–13)		22,780	48–42
91	July 15	@ Orioles	6–5	Tomlin (11–4)	Johnson (5–3)	C. Perez (22)	27,352	49–42
92	July 16	@ Orioles	6–5	Simón (2–2)	Carrasco (8–7)	Gonzalez (1)	24,835	49–43
93	July 17	@ Orioles	8–3	Hendrickson (1–0)	Gómez (0–2)		17,754	49–44
94	July 18	@ Twins	5–2	Huff (1–0)	Swarzak (2–3)	Pestano (2)	39,768	50–44
95	July 18	@ Twins	6–3	Carmona (5–10)	Diamond (0–1)		38,491	51–44
96	July 19	@ Twins	2–1	Perkins (2–1)	C. Perez (2–5)		38,473	51–45
97	July 20	@ Twins	7–5	Capps (3–5)	Sipp (4–2)	Nathan (6)	39,167	51–46
98	July 22	White Sox	3–0	Floyd (8–9)	Carrasco (8–8)	Santos (19)	27,477	51–47
	July 23	White Sox	Postponed (rain); Makeup: September 20 (Game 1)					
99	July 24	White Sox	4–2	Jackson (7–7)	Masterson (8–7)	Santos (20)	20,252	51–48
100	July 25	Angels	3–2	Sipp (5–2)	Walden (2–3)		19,384	52–48
101	July 26	Angels	2–1	Weaver (14–4)	Tomlin (11–5)	Walden (24)	19,430	52–49
102	July 27	Angels	3–1	Santana (6–8)	Huff (1–1)		21,546	52–50
103	July 29	Royals	12–0	Francis (4–11)	Carrasco (8–9)		35,390	52–51
104	July 30	Royals	5–2	Sipp (6–2)	Soria (5–4)		31,436	53–51
105	July 31	Royals	5–3	Duffy (3–4)	Carmona (5–11)	Soria (20)	21,101	53–52

August: 15–13 (Home: 10–5, Road: 5–8)

#	Date	Opponent	Score	Win	Loss	Save	Attendance	Record
106	August 1	@ Red Sox	9–6	R. Pérez (4–1)	Bard (1–5)		37,943	54–52
107	August 2	@ Red Sox	3–2	Papelbon (3–0)	Pestano (1–1)		38,101	54–53
108	August 3	@ Red Sox	4–3	Papelbon (4–0)	Smith (2–2)		38,172	54–54
109	August 4	@ Red Sox	7–3	Masterson (9–7)	Morales (0–2)		38,477	55–54
110	August 5	@ Rangers	8–7 (11)	Feliz (1–2)	R. Pérez (4–2)		37,842	55–55
111	August 6	@ Rangers	7–5	Herrmann (2–0)	Feliz (1–3)	C. Perez (23)	38,210	56–55
112	August 7	@ Rangers	5–3	Oliver (4–5)	Smith (2–3)	Adams (1)	37,431	56–56
113	August 9	Tigers	3–2 (14)	Herrmann (3–0)	Pauley (5–5)		25,317	57–56
114	August 10	Tigers	10–3	Jiménez (1–0)	Porcello (11–7)		23,258	58–56
115	August 11	Tigers	4–3	Verlander (17–5)	Carmona (5–12)	Valverde (33)	30,988	58–57
116	August 12	Twins	3–2	R. Pérez (5–2)	Perkins (4–3)	C. Perez (24)	31,364	59–57
117	August 13	Twins	3–1	Tomlin (12–5)	Duensing (8–11)	C. Perez (25)	30,619	60–57
	August 14	Twins	Postponed (rain); Makeup: September 24 (Game 1)					
118	August 16	@ White Sox	8–7 (14)	Frasor (3–2)	Durbin (2–2)		24,695	60–58
119	August 17	@ White Sox	4–1	Carmona (6–12)	Buehrle (10–6)	C. Perez (26)	25,029	61–58
120	August 18	@ White Sox	4–2	Masterson (10–7)	Ohman (0–3)	C. Perez (27)	27,079	62–58
121	August 19	@ Tigers	4–1	Scherzer (13–7)	Tomlin (12–6)	Valverde (36)	44,222	62–59
122	August 20	@ Tigers	10–1	Fister (5–13)	Huff (1–2)		44,629	62–60
123	August 21	@ Tigers	8–7	Coke (2–8)	Jiménez (1–1)	Valverde (37)	43,388	62–61
124	August 22	Mariners	3–2	Ruffin (1–0)	C. Perez (2–6)	League (31)	21,582	62–62
125	August 23	Mariners	7–5	C. Perez (3–6)	League (1–5)		22,805	63–62
126	August 23	Mariners	12–7	Vasquez (1–0)	McAllister (0–1)	Gray (1)	22,590	63–63
127	August 24	Mariners	9–2	Hernández (12–11)	Tomlin (12–7)		16,037	63–64
128	August 26	Royals	2–1	Jiménez (2–1)	Paulino (2–10)	C. Perez (28)	41,337	64–64
129	August 27	Royals	8–7	Smith (3–3)	Coleman (1–4)	C. Perez (29)	35,370	65–64
130	August 28	Royals	2–1	Chen (10–5)	Masterson (10–8)	Soria (24)	27,908	65–65
131	August 29	Athletics	2–1	Huff (2–2)	McCarthy (7–7)	C. Perez (30)	18,201	66–65
132	August 30	Athletics	6–2	Gómez (1–2)	Cahill (9–13)		20,372	67–65
133	August 31	Athletics	4–3 (16)	Herrmann (4–0)	Outman (3–4)		15,202	68–65

September 12–17 (Home: 5–8, Road: 7–9)

#	Date	Opponent	Score	Win	Loss	Save	Attendance	Record
134	September 1	Athletics	7–0	Gonzalez (12–11)	Carmona (6–13)		14,192	68–66
135	September 2	@ Royals	5–4	Masterson (11–8)	Chen (10–6)	C. Perez (31)	27,251	69–66
136	September 3	@ Royals	5–1	Hochevar (10–10)	Huff (2–3)		27,126	69–67
137	September 4	@ Royals	9–6	Gómez (2–2)	Francis (5–15)	C. Perez (32)	34,015	70–67
138	September 5	Tigers	4–2	Fister (7–13)	Jiménez (2–2)	Valverde (41)	39,824	70–68
139	September 6	Tigers	10–1	Porcello (13–8)	Carmona (6–14)		27,544	70–69
140	September 7	Tigers	8–6	Verlander (22–5)	Masterson (11–9)	Valverde (42)	16,783	70–70
141	September 8	@ White Sox	8–1	Thornton (1–4)	Huff (2–4)		22,063	70–71
142	September 9	@ White Sox	8–4	Gómez (3–2)	Buehrle (11–8)		26,711	71–71
143	September 10	@ White Sox	7–3 (10)	Santos (4–4)	C. Perez (3–7)		26,719	71–72
144	September 11	@ White Sox	7–3	Jiménez (3–2)	Stewart (2–4)		22,319	72–72
145	September 13	@ Rangers	10–4	Harrison (12–9)	Masterson (11–10)		30,107	72–73
146	September 14	@ Rangers	9–1	Holland (14–5)	Huff (2–5)		38,710	72–74
147	September 15	@ Rangers	7–4	Ogando (13–8)	Carmona (6–15)		44,242	72–75
148	September 16	@ Twins	7–6	Jiménez (4–2)	Slowey (0–6)	C. Perez (33)	37,942	73–75
149	September 17	@ Twins	10–4	Gómez (4–2)	Swarzak (3–7)		38,805	74–75
150	September 18	@ Twins	6–5	Masterson (12–10)	Pavano (8–13)	C. Perez (34)	37,012	75–75
151	September 19	Mariners	12–6 (7)	Furbush (4–9)	Huff (2–6)		15,354	75–76
152	September 20	White Sox	4–3	Carmona (7–15)	Floyd (12–12)	C. Perez (35)	28,603	76–76
153	September 20	White Sox	5–4	Thornton (2–5)	Putnam (0–1)	Sale (7)	19,582	76–77
154	September 21	White Sox	8–4	Buehrle (12–9)	Jiménez (4–3)		12,400	76–78
155	September 22	White Sox	11–2	Gómez (5–2)	Humber (9–9)		21,487	77–78
156	September 23	Twins	6–5	C. Perez (4–7)	Capps (4–7)		36,807	78–78
157	September 24	Twins	8–2	Putnam (1–1)	Liriano (9–10)		26,197	79–78
158	September 24	Twins	7–6	Hagadone (1–0)	Mijares (0–2)	C. Perez (36)	30,748	80–78
159	September 25	Twins	6–4 (10)	Waldrop (1–0)	Sipp (6–3)	Nathan (14)	22,539	80–79
160	September 26	@ Tigers	14–0	Fister (11–13)	Jiménez (4–4)		29,886	80–80
161	September 27	@ Tigers	9–6	Scherzer (15–9)	Gómez (5–3)	Valverde (48)	31,132	80–81
162	September 28	@ Tigers	5–4	Perry (2–0)	Pestano (1–2)	Valverde (49)	31,645	80–82

== Player stats ==
=== Batting ===
Note: G = Games played; AB = At bats; R = Runs scored; H = Hits; 2B = Doubles; 3B = Triples; HR = Home runs; RBI = Runs batted in; AVG = Batting average; SB = Stolen bases

Player	G	AB	R	H	2B	3B	HR	RBI	AVG	SB
Michael Brantley	114	451	63	120	24	4	7	46	.266	13
Travis Buck	50	149	18	34	11	0	2	18	.228	1
Asdrúbal Cabrera	151	604	87	165	32	3	25	92	.273	17
Orlando Cabrera	91	324	35	79	13	0	4	38	.244	6
Fausto Carmona	2	3	0	0	0	0	0	0	.000	0
Carlos Carrasco	2	5	0	0	0	0	0	0	.000	0
Ezequiel Carrera	68	202	27	49	8	3	0	13	.243	10
Lonnie Chisenhall	66	211	27	54	13	0	7	22	.255	1
Shin-Soo Choo	85	313	37	81	11	3	8	36	.259	12
Trevor Crowe	15	28	6	6	1	0	0	2	.214	3
Jason Donald	39	132	13	42	6	1	1	8	.318	3
Shelley Duncan	76	223	29	58	17	0	11	47	.260	0
Chad Durbin	3	0	0	0	0	0	0	0	—	0
Adam Everett	34	60	9	13	1	0	0	1	.217	1
Kosuke Fukudome	59	237	26	59	12	1	5	22	.249	2
Travis Hafner	94	325	41	91	16	0	13	57	.280	0
Jack Hannahan	110	320	38	80	16	2	8	40	.250	2
Jerad Head	10	24	2	3	1	0	0	1	.125	1
Frank Herrmann	1	1	0	0	0	0	0	0	.000	0
Josh Judy	1	0	0	0	0	0	0	0	—	0
Austin Kearns	57	150	18	30	5	1	2	7	.200	0
Jason Kipnis	36	136	24	37	9	1	7	18	.272	5
Matt LaPorta	107	352	34	87	24	1	11	53	.247	1
Lou Marson	79	243	26	56	9	2	1	19	.230	4
Justin Masterson	2	6	0	1	0	0	0	0	.167	0
Chris Perez	2	0	0	0	0	0	0	0	—	0
Rafael Perez	4	0	0	0	0	0	0	0	—	0
Vinnie Pestano	4	0	0	0	0	0	0	0	—	0
Cord Phelps	35	71	10	11	2	1	1	6	.155	1
Carlos Santana	155	552	84	132	35	2	27	79	.239	5
Tony Sipp	4	0	0	0	0	0	0	0	—	0
Grady Sizemore	71	268	34	60	21	1	10	32	.224	0
Joe Smith	5	0	0	0	0	0	0	0	—	0
Mitch Talbot	2	2	0	0	0	0	0	0	.000	0
Jim Thome	22	71	11	21	4	0	3	10	.296	0
Josh Tomlin	2	2	1	2	0	0	0	0	1.000	0
Luis Valbuena	17	43	4	9	0	0	1	1	.209	1
Team Totals	162	5508	704	1380	290	26	155	667	.250	89

=== Pitching ===
Note: W = Wins; L = Losses; ERA = Earned run average; G = Games pitched; GS = Games started; SV = Saves; IP = Innings pitched; H = Hits allowed; R = Runs allowed; ER = Earned runs allowed; BB = Walks allowed; K = Strikeouts

Player	W	L	ERA	G	GS	SV	IP	H	R	ER	BB	K
Fausto Carmona	7	15	5.25	32	32	0	188.2	205	125	110	60	109
Carlos Carrasco	8	9	4.62	21	21	0	124.2	130	68	64	40	85
Chad Durbin	2	2	5.53	56	0	0	68.1	86	45	42	26	59
Justin Germano	0	1	5.68	9	0	0	12.2	15	8	8	5	5
Jeanmar Gómez	5	3	4.47	11	10	0	58.1	73	31	29	15	31
Nick Hagadone	1	0	4.09	9	0	0	11.0	4	6	5	6	11
Frank Herrmann	4	0	5.11	40	0	0	56.1	71	35	32	16	34
David Huff	2	6	4.09	11	10	0	50.2	55	35	23	17	36
Ubaldo Jiménez	4	4	5.10	11	11	0	65.1	68	43	37	27	62
Josh Judy	0	0	7.07	12	0	0	14.0	18	11	11	4	10
Corey Kluber	0	0	8.31	3	0	0	4.1	6	4	4	3	5
Justin Masterson	12	10	3.21	34	33	0	216.0	211	89	77	65	158
Zach McAllister	0	1	6.11	4	4	0	17.2	26	16	12	7	14
Chris Perez	4	7	3.32	64	0	36	59.2	46	24	22	26	39
Rafael Perez	5	2	3.00	71	0	0	63.0	59	27	21	19	33
Vinnie Pestano	1	2	2.32	67	0	2	62.0	41	16	16	24	84
Zach Putnam	1	1	6.14	8	0	0	7.1	10	5	5	0	9
Tony Sipp	6	3	3.03	68	0	0	61.1	45	22	21	22	55
Joe Smith	3	3	2.01	71	0	0	67.0	52	16	15	21	45
Mitch Talbot	2	6	6.64	12	12	0	63.2	90	47	47	28	36
Josh Tomlin	12	7	4.25	26	26	0	165.1	157	80	78	21	89
Alex White	1	0	3.60	3	3	0	15.0	14	7	6	9	13
Team Totals	80	82	4.23	162	162	36	1453.1	1482	760	684	463	1024

== Notes/records ==
- The crowd of 9,853 on April 2 set a Progressive Field record for lowest attendance in the stadium's history. This record was broken a day later with an attendance of 8,726.
- On April 29, the Indians set a franchise record with their 17 April win. They broke the record again the next day, ending April with 18 wins.
- The Indians tied a franchise record best start thru 30 games, going 21–9.
- The Indians had their best start at home in franchise history, going 14–2.
- Shortstop Asdrúbal Cabrera and pitcher Chris Perez were selected for the 2011 Major League Baseball All-Star Game, the first selection for both players. Cabrera was named the starting shortstop when Derek Jeter pulled out due to injury.
- On July 27, Ervin Santana of the Los Angeles Angels of Anaheim pitched a no-hitter against the Indians, allowing an unearned run in a 3–1 win. He struck out 10 and allowed one walk. It is the first no-hitter thrown in the history of Progressive Field since it opened in 1994.
- On August 3, second baseman Jason Kipnis became the first player in MLB history to hit a home run in four consecutive games within two weeks of his major league debut.
- On August 4, Justin Masterson struck out four batters in the second inning against the Boston Red Sox, the 56th occurrence in MLB history.
- On August 31, the Indians and Oakland Athletics combined for 39 strikeouts, a Progressive Field record.

== Farm system ==
Level	Team	League	Manager
AAA	Columbus Clippers	International League	Mike Sarbaugh
AA	Akron Aeros	Eastern League	Chris Tremie
A	Kinston Eagles	Carolina League	Aaron Holbert
A	Lake County Captains	Midwest League	Ted Kubiak
A-Short Season	Mahoning Valley Scrappers	New York–Penn League	David Wallace
Rookie	AZL Indians	Arizona League	Tony Medrano

LEAGUE CHAMPIONS: Columbus
