= Mahoning Valley Scrappers =

- Founded in 1999; Niles, Ohio
Team logo
Cap insignia

Minor league affiliations
- Class: Collegiate summer (2021–present)
- Previous classes: Class A Short-Season (1999–2020)
- League: MLB Draft League (2021–present)
- Previous leagues: New York–Penn League (1999–2020)

Major league affiliations
- Team: Unaffiliated (2021–present)
- Previous teams: Cleveland Indians (1999–2020)

Minor league titles
- League titles (1): 2004
- Division titles (6): 1999; 2000; 2004; 2009; 2017; 2018

Team data
- Name: Mahoning Valley Scrappers (1999–present)
- Colors: Navy blue, cardinal, light gray, dark gray, gold
- Ballpark: 7 17 Credit Union Field at Eastwood (1999–present)
- Owner/ Operator: HWS Group
- General manager: Heather Sahli
- Manager: Raul Gonzalez
- Website: mlbdraftleague.com/mahoning-valley

The Mahoning Valley Scrappers are a collegiate summer baseball team of the MLB Draft League. They are located in Niles, Ohio, a city in the valley of the Mahoning River and play their home games at 7 17 Credit Union Field at Eastwood. From 1999 to 2020, they were a Minor League Baseball team that played as members of the New York–Penn League. The club was the Class A Short Season affiliate of the Cleveland Indians from its inception until Major League Baseball's reorganization of the minors following the 2020 season.

In 2004, the Scrappers won the New York–Penn League championship.

== History ==
The Mahoning Valley Scrappers were established in 1999 in Niles, Ohio, as a Class A Short-Season franchise in the New York–Penn League. The team originated when the New York–Penn League’s Erie SeaWolves franchise relocated to the Mahoning Valley following expansion in the Eastern League. The Scrappers were affiliated with the Cleveland Indians (now Cleveland Guardians), serving as a developmental team for newly drafted players entering professional baseball.

The franchise made an immediate impact in its inaugural 1999 season, finishing with a 43–33 record and winning its division before advancing to the league finals. Early success helped establish strong local support, with the team drawing over 200,000 fans in its first season.

The team transitioned into a founding member of the MLB Draft League in 2021, a collegiate summer league designed to showcase draft-eligible players.

Today, the Scrappers continue to operate in Niles, Ohio, playing at 7 17 Credit Union Field at Eastwood (formerly known as Eastwood Field)

== Season-by-season results ==
=== Regular season ===
Season	Affiliation	Manager	Record
1999	Indians	Ted Kubiak	43–33, 1st place McNamara
2000	Indians	Ted Kubiak	48–28, 1st place Pinckney
2001	Indians	Dave Turgeon	26–49, 7th place Pinckney-Stedler
2002	Indians	Chris Bando	46–30, 2nd place Pinckney
2003	Indians	Ted Kubiak	38–36, 2nd place Pinckney
2004	Indians	Mike Sarbaugh	42–34, 2nd place Pinckney
2005	Indians	Rouglas Odor	33–43, 3rd place Pinckney
2006	Indians	Rouglas Odor	36–34, 3rd place Pinckney
2007	Indians	Tim Laker	37–37, 2nd place Pinckney
2008	Indians	Travis Fryman	31–44, 5th place Pinckney
2009	Indians	Travis Fryman	49–27, 1st place Pinckney
2010	Indians	Travis Fryman	30–46, 6th place Pinckney
2011	Indians	David Wallace	41–34, 3rd place Pinckney
2012	Indians	Ted Kubiak	30–45, 5th place Pinckney
2013	Indians	Ted Kubiak	30–44, 5th place Pinckney
2014	Indians	Ted Kubiak	33-42, 5th place Pinckney
2015	Indians	Travis Fryman	31-44, 6th place Pinckney
2016	Indians	Edwin Rodriguez	37-38, 4th place Pinckney
2017	Indians	Luke Carlin	44-29, 1st place Pinckney
2018	Indians	Jim Pankovits	42-33, 1st place Pinckney
2019	Indians	Jim Pankovits	37-39, 4th place Pinckney
2020	Season cancelled due to COVID-19 pandemic		
2021	None	Coco Crisp	27-28-2, 3rd place League
2022	None	Homer Bush	32-47, 6th place League
2023	None	Dmitri Young	30-42, 5th place League
2024	None	Quinton McCraken	37-38, 4th place League
2025	None	Quinton McCraken	38-38, 3rd place League
2026	None	Raul Gonzalez	34-45 6th place League)

=== Post-season ===
- 1999: Defeated Batavia Muckdogs, 2 games to 0; lost to Hudson Valley Renegades, 2 games to 1, in NYPL Championship Series
- 2000: Defeated Batavia Muckdogs, 2 games to 0; lost to Staten Island Yankees, 2 games to 1, in NYPL Championship Series
- 2004: Defeated Auburn Doubledays, 2 games to 0; defeated Tri-City ValleyCats, 2 games to 0, in NYPL Championship Series
- 2009: Defeated Brooklyn Cyclones, 2 games to 0; lost to Staten Island Yankees, 2 games to 1 in NYPL Championship Series
- 2017: Lost to Vermont Lake Monsters, 2 games to 0
- 2018: Lost to Tri-City ValleyCats, 2 games to 0

== Roster ==
Mahoning Valley Scrappers roster
Players	Coaches/Other
Pitchers: 1 Jeremiah Newman; 15 Eli Edds; 16 Blake Barker; 17 Nick Anello; 23 Alexander Llinas; 27 David Johnson; 37 Reagan Rivera; 39 Jacob Faulkner; 40 Justin Abercrombie; 41 Lynden Bruegman; 43 Matt Davis; 44 Alex Kanipe; Catchers: 24 Julian Hernandez; 26 Mike Young; Infielders: 11 Cooper Vance; 22 Kaikea Harrison; 28 Jayden Hylton; 30 Maddox Mihalakis; 33 Jason Torres; 34 Cayden Evans; 50 Josiah Seguin; Outfielders: 2 Jordan Taylor; 4 Davis Mauzy; 7 Tervell Johnson; 36 Zion Williams	Manager: 9 Raúl González; Coaches: 52 Jason Standford (hitting); 6 Orlando Merced (hitting); 7-day injured list; ~ Development list; # Rehab assignment; ∞ Reserve list; ‡ Restricted list; § Suspended list; † Temporarily inactive list; Roster updated August 12, 2026; → More MiLB rosters

== Broadcasters and radio affiliations ==
The Youngstown, Ohio radio station WBBW (1240 AM) originally broadcast Scrappers games from 1999 to 2001 with John Batcho calling the games. In 2002, WNIO (1390 AM) took over broadcasting Scrappers games from 2002 to 2009. Mike Pilch called their games in 2006 and 2007 while the broadcasts right were with Clear Channel. WHTX (1570 AM) took over in 2010, followed by WHKZ (1440 AM The Word) broadcast Scrappers games in 2013, both radio stations from Warren, Ohio. Austin Pollack was named the play-by-play broadcaster in January 2015. Pollack will broadcast all 76 games for the Scrappers. In 2015, the Scrappers switched back to WBBW (Sportsradio 1240 AM). All of the games were carried live. From 2021 until 2022, local sports broadcasting network Your Sports Network, commonly referred to as YSNn began broadcasting Scrappers games on their website. Ron Potesta covered play by play duties in 2021 before Richie Juliano assumed the responsibilities of the "Voice of the Scrappers" in 2022.

Former Channel 27 news anchor Robb Schmidt, is the current P.A. announcer. Schmidt took over the position from John Brown, who was a communications student at Youngstown State University and served as announcer in 2009 and 2010. Brown replaced current Cleveland Indians announcer Ryan Pritt.

== Alumni ==
- Greg Allen (Indians)
- Josh Bard (Mariners)
- Shane Bieber (Indians)
- Jordan Brown (Indians)
- Asdrúbal Cabrera (Indians)
- Fausto Carmona (Indians)
- Lonnie Chisenhall (Indians)
- Ryan Church (Diamondbacks)
- José Constanza (Braves)
- Trevor Crowe (Indians)
- Chad Durbin (Indians)
- Ben Francisco (Phillies)
- Ryan Garko (Rangers)
- Chris Gimenez (Indians)
- Erik González (Indians)
- David Huff (Indians)
- Joe Inglett (Astros)
- Josh Judy (Indians)
- Jason Kipnis (Indians)
- Kevin Kouzmanoff (Athletics)
- Aaron Laffey (Mariners)
- Jensen Lewis (Indians)
- Francisco Lindor (Mets)
- Héctor Luna (Marlins)
- Víctor Martinez (Tigers)
- John McDonald (Blue Jays)
- Francisco Mejía (Indians)
- Eli Morgan (Indians)
- Tyler Naquin (Indians)
- Cord Phelps (Indians)
- José Ramírez (Indians)
- CC Sabathia (Yankees)
- Anthony Santander (Toronto Blue Jays)
- Tony Sipp (Indians)
- Mitch Talbot (Indians)
- Brian Tallet (Cardinals)
- Josh Tomlin (Indians)
- Wyatt Toregas (Pirates)
- Joey Wendle (Athletics)
- Tony Wolters (Rockies)
- Bradley Zimmer (Indians)
