= Frank Herrmann =

American baseball player (born 1984)

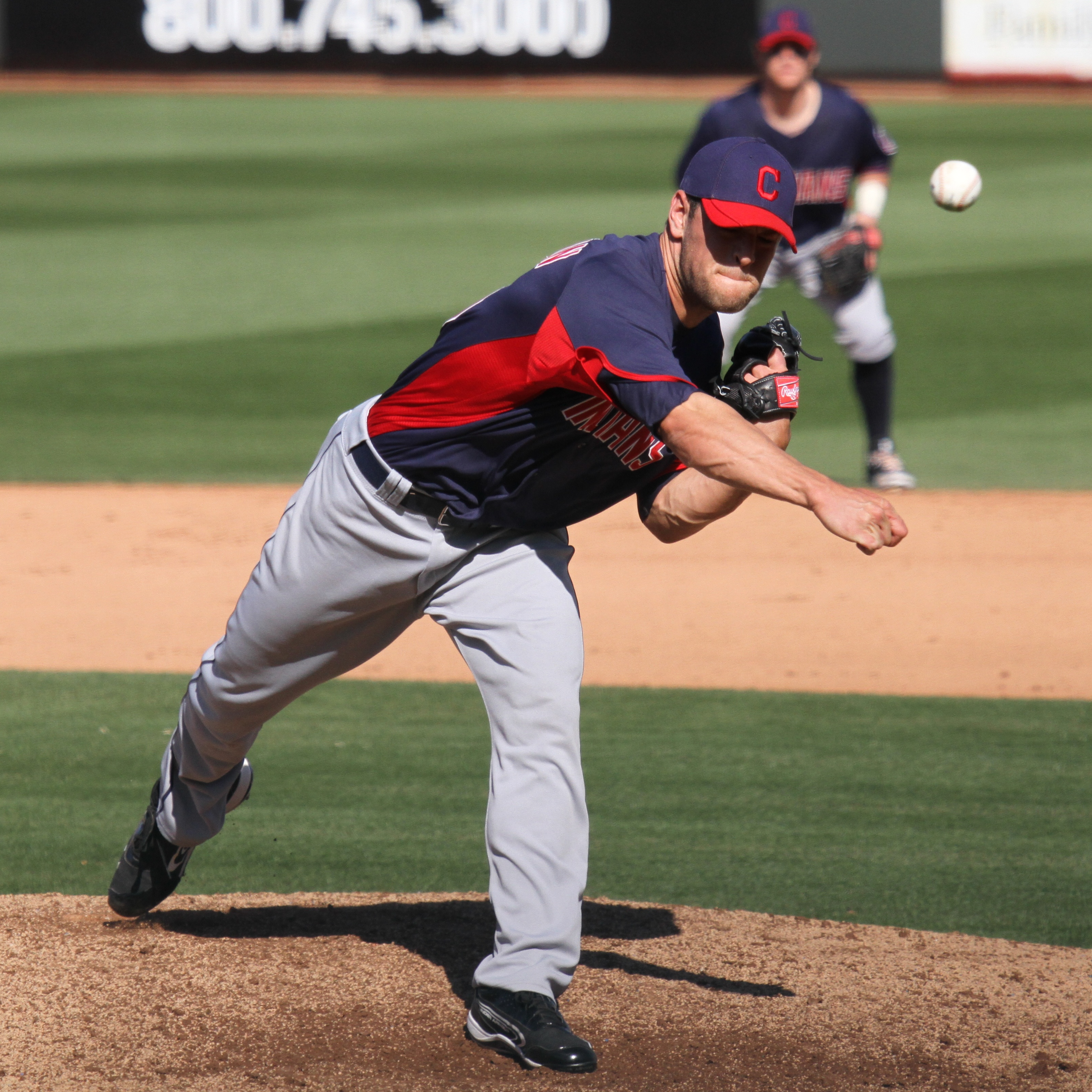
- Herrmann with the Cleveland Indians
- Pitcher
- Born: May 30, 1984 (age 42); Rutherford, New Jersey, U.S.
- Batted: Left Threw: Right

Professional debut
- MLB: June 4, 2010, for the Cleveland Indians
- NPB: March 31, 2017, for the Tohoku Rakuten Golden Eagles

Last appearance
- MLB: October 1, 2016, for the Philadelphia Phillies
- NPB: October 16, 2021, for the Chiba Lotte Marines

MLB statistics
- Win–loss record: 5–3
- Earned run average: 4.72
- Strikeouts: 86

NPB statistics
- Win–loss record: 14-10
- Earned run average: 3.00
- Strikeouts: 231
- Saves: 20
- Stats at Baseball Reference

Teams
- Cleveland Indians (2010–2012); Philadelphia Phillies (2016); Tohoku Rakuten Golden Eagles (2017–2019); Chiba Lotte Marines (2020–2021)

Frank Joseph Herrmann (born May 30, 1984), is an American former professional baseball pitcher. He played in Major League Baseball (MLB) for the Cleveland Indians and Philadelphia Phillies, and in Nippon Professional Baseball (NPB) for the Tohoku Rakuten Golden Eagles and Chiba Lotte Marines.

== Amateur career ==
=== High school ===
Herrmann attended Montclair Kimberley Academy, where he played baseball, football, and basketball. He was one of the school's few thousand point scorers in basketball. In 2011, he was inducted into the MKA Athletic Hall of Fame.

=== College ===
For parts of the Spring and Fall 2006 semesters, Herrmann authored a column for The Harvard Crimson. He penned nine stories. The column functioned as a diary of his first year as a professional athlete. Though the editor's note before each article describes him as a "former Harvard" pitcher, the stories were written and published before he graduated from Harvard.

Herrmann received his degree in economics from Harvard University in the fall of 2006. He is the fifteenth player to play in the majors after going to Harvard. Jeff Musselman had been the last. As a junior, he pitched a two-hitter against Yale and a one-hitter against Cornell. At the time of his signing with Cleveland, he was not finished with his studies at Harvard, so the Indians allowed him to return to complete his requirements and finish his degree.

== Professional career ==
=== Cleveland Indians ===
Herrmann was signed as an undrafted free agent by the Cleveland Indians in 2006. He made his professional debut with the Single-A Lake County Captains, where he pitched to a 3.90 ERA and 4–6 record in 26 games. In 2007, he played for the High-A Kinston Indians, recording an 11–5 record and 4.01 ERA in 26 appearances. The next year, Herrmann split the season between the Triple-A Buffalo Bisons, the Double-A Akron Aeros and Kinston, accumulating an 11–8 record and 4.14 ERA between the three teams. With the Aeros in 2008, Herrmann made 23 starts and, with his 11–6 regular season record and helped lead the team to the 2008 Eastern League championship series. In 2009, he split the season between the Triple-A Columbus Clippers and Akron, posting a 4–4 record and 2.95 ERA in 49 games.

Hermann was promoted to the major leagues for the first time and made his major league debut with the Indians on June 4, 2010. In a game against the Chicago White Sox, he pitched 1.1 innings and gave up no hits, runs, or walks. He was credited with his first career hold, retiring all four batters he faced: Gordon Beckham, Juan Pierre, Omar Vizquel, and Alex Ríos. He struck out Vizquel for the first strikeout of his major league career. He finished his rookie season with a 4.03 ERA in 40 major league appearances, also notching a minuscule 0.31 ERA in 19 Columbus games. In 2011, Herrmann appeared in 40 major league games, and pitched to a 4–0 record and a 5.11 ERA. He spent the majority of the 2012 season in Columbus, but posted a 2.33 ERA in 15 major league games for the Indians.

On March 13, 2013, Herrmann underwent Tommy John surgery, causing him to miss the entire 2013 season. On December 2, 2013, Herrmann signed a one-year deal with the Indians, avoiding arbitration. He was designated for assignment on March 30, 2014. He was outrighted to Triple-A Columbus on April 8, where he spent the season, pitching to a 6.37 ERA in 28 games. He was released by the Indians organization on August 11, 2014.

=== Los Angeles Angels ===
On January 27, 2015, Herrmann signed a minor league contract with the Los Angeles Angels organization that included an invitation to Spring Training. He was assigned to the Triple-A Salt Lake Bees to begin the season. After recording a 4.05 ERA in 37 games in Salt Lake, Herrmann was released on August 11, 2015.

=== Pittsburgh Pirates ===
On August 16, 2015, Herrmann signed a minor league deal with the Pittsburgh Pirates organization. He finished the season with the Triple-A Indianapolis Indians, pitching to a 1.50 ERA in 7 appearances. He elected free agency on November 6, 2015.

=== Philadelphia Phillies ===
On November 18, 2015, Herrmann signed a minor league deal with the Philadelphia Phillies that included an invitation to Spring Training. He was assigned to the Triple-A Lehigh Valley IronPigs to begin the year, where he pitched to a 6–1 record and 1.72 ERA in 27 games. On August 17, 2016, Herrmann was selected to the active roster. Herrman recorded an 8.40 ERA in 14 games for Philadelphia, but was outrighted off of the 40-man roster on October 7. He elected free agency on October 13.

=== Tohoku Rakuten Golden Eagles ===
On November 29, 2016, Herrmann signed with the Tohoku Rakuten Golden Eagles of Nippon Professional Baseball. Herrmann appeared in 56 games for Rakuten in 2017, pitching to a 2.72 ERA with 58 strikeouts in 53.0 innings of work. The next year, he recorded a stellar 1.99 ERA with 44 strikeouts in 47 appearances. In 2019, Herrmann pitched to a 5–3 record and 3.04 ERA with 49 strikeouts in 50 games. On December 2, 2019, he became a free agent.

=== Chiba Lotte Marines ===
On December 19, 2019, Herrmann signed with the Chiba Lotte Marines of NPB. In 38 games for the club, Herrmann recorded a neat 2.15 ERA with 37 strikeouts in 38 appearances. On December 2, 2020, Herrmann became a free agent. On December 15, 2020, he re-signed with the Marines. Herrmann worked to a 5.19 ERA with 41 strikeouts in 45 appearances for Lotte in 2021.

== Post-playing career ==
On February 18, 2022, Herrmann joined the Toronto Blue Jays' front office in a scouting, player development, and baseball operations role.

== Personal ==
Hermann married Johanna Nicole Rangel at the Harvard Memorial Chapel on November 6, 2010.
