= Jason Kipnis =

American baseball player (born 1987)

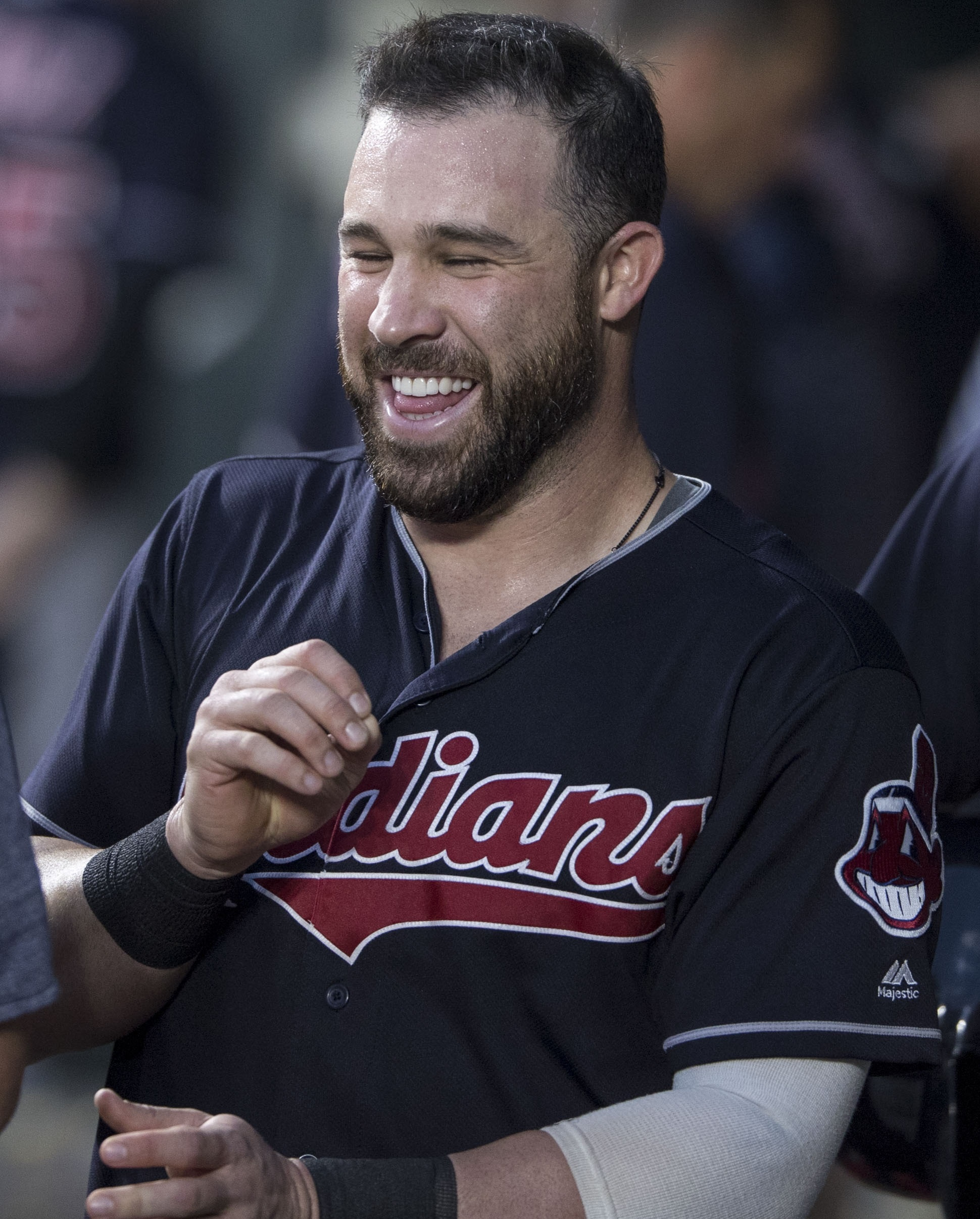
- Kipnis with the Cleveland Indians in 2017
- Second baseman
- Born: April 3, 1987 (age 39); Northbrook, Illinois, U.S.
- Batted: Left Threw: Right

MLB debut
- July 22, 2011, for the Cleveland Indians

Last MLB appearance
- September 27, 2020, for the Chicago Cubs

MLB statistics
- Batting average: .260
- Home runs: 126
- Runs batted in: 545
- Stats at Baseball Reference

Teams
- Cleveland Indians (2011–2019); Chicago Cubs (2020)

Career highlights and awards
- 2× All-Star (2013, 2015)

Jason Michael Kipnis (born April 3, 1987; nicknamed "Kip") is an American former professional baseball second baseman. He played in Major League Baseball (MLB) for the Cleveland Indians and Chicago Cubs. He attended Glenbrook North High School in the suburbs of Chicago where he earned three letters playing baseball for the Glenbrook North Spartans. He attended the University of Kentucky, but transferred to Arizona State University after two years. In college, Kipnis was an All-American and the 2009 Pacific-10 Conference Player of the Year for the Sun Devils.

The Indians selected Kipnis in the second round of the 2009 Major League Baseball draft. In 2010, he was named the Indians' Minor League Player of the Year, and a Baseball America Minor League All Star. Prior to the 2011 season, Baseball Prospectus ranked him as the top Indians prospect and the 28th-highest prospect in baseball. At mid-season, Baseball America rated him as baseball's 31st-best prospect. He was called up from the minor leagues on July 22, 2011. In 2012, he became the starting second baseman for the Indians.

== Early life ==
Jason Michael Kipnis was born on April 3, 1987, in Northbrook, Illinois, a suburb of Chicago. He was the fourth child born to Kay and Mark Kipnis. He has two older brothers, Blair and Todd. His older sister Amanda played softball at the University of Maryland. When he was a child, his father played an important role in his baseball life. He played Little League and American Legion Baseball. Though Kipnis played baseball, football, and soccer while growing up, he said there was never any question that his goal was to become a professional baseball player. He grew up a Chicago Cubs fan, and was neighbors with Steve Bartman.

== High school ==
Kipnis attended Glenbrook North High School in Northbrook, graduating in 2005. He earned three letters in baseball for the Glenbrook North Spartans and was selected as team captain twice. He played shortstop, center field and pitcher. As an all-conference junior, Kipnis batted .455 with a, at the time, school-record of 11 home runs. As a senior, Kipnis batted .521 with a .690 on-base percentage and 32 stolen bases in 32 attempts; he was named first-team all-state and the Central Suburban League Most Valuable Player. He was named all-conference in both his junior and senior seasons.

As a freshman at Glenbrook North, Kipnis played soccer, setting the school's single-season goal scoring record with 41. He also played football there in 2003 and 2004. An All-Conference wide receiver, Kipnis set single-season school records for receptions, yards, and touchdowns. He also established school records for career receptions and receiving yards. As a senior in 2004, Kipnis had 49 pass receptions for 956 yards and 10 touchdowns. His 2004 totals remain Glenbrook North single-season records for receptions, receiving yards, and receiving touchdowns. Kipnis still holds the school's career record with 1,247 receiving yards. In December 2004, the Pioneer Press sports staff selected Kipnis as a member of its "2004 North Stars", the all-star football team for the Central Suburban League's North Division. In announcing its selection, the Pioneer Press noted: "Quite simply one of the top receivers in the state, a player who piled up impressive numbers despite the fact the Spartans averaged barely 15 passing attempts per game."

== College ==
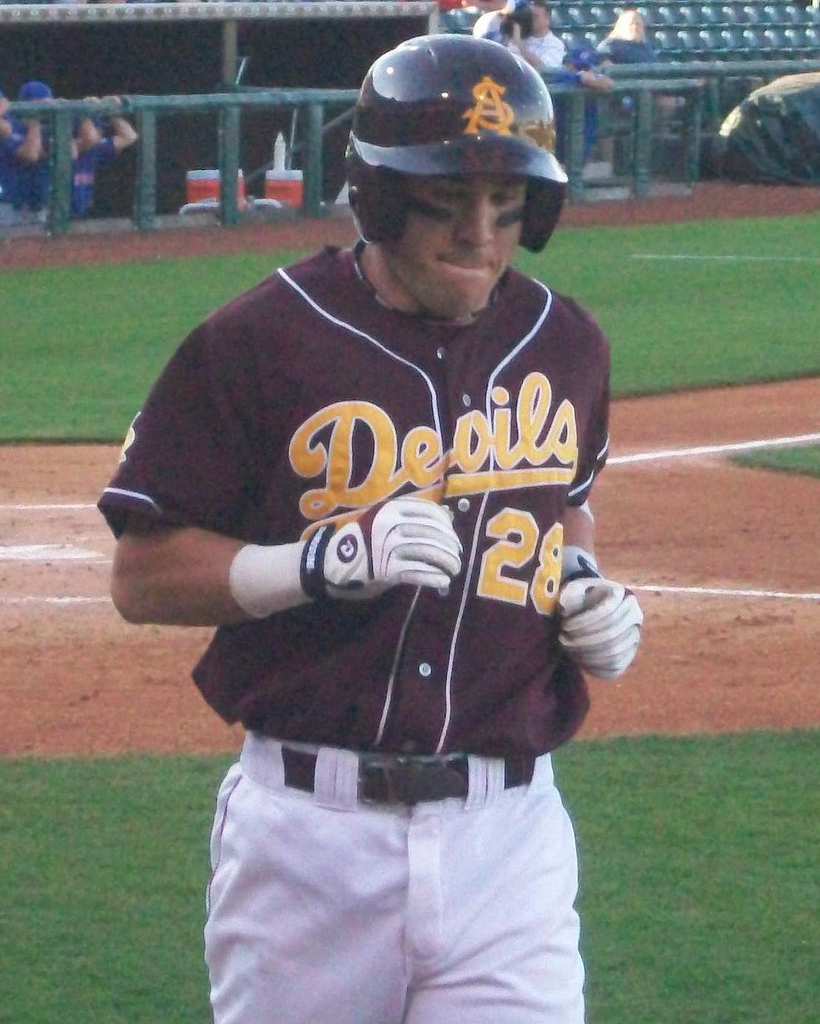
Kipnis with the Arizona State Sun Devils, in 2009

After graduating from high school in 2005, Kipnis attended the University of Kentucky and then Arizona State University. At the University of Kentucky, Kipnis redshirted during the 2006 baseball season. In the spring of 2007, Kipnis batted .337 for the Wildcats with a .450 on-base percentage as an outfielder while stealing 11 bases in 12 attempts in 34 games. In February of that year, Kipnis was awarded Southeastern Conference Freshman of the Week honors. In the summer before his sophomore year, Kipnis played for the Covington Lumberjacks of the Valley Baseball League, an NCAA-sanctioned collegiate summer baseball league in the Shenandoah Valley region of Virginia. He batted .318 with a .505 on-base percentage and 24 stolen bases.

After two years at the University of Kentucky, Kipnis transferred to Arizona State University. He played baseball for the Sun Devils and double-majored in psychology and sociology. In an interview, Kipnis stated that the University of Kentucky wasn't the right fit for him and that ASU's college baseball reputation would make it a better fit.

In 2008, Kipnis batted .371 with 14 home runs and 73 runs batted in. He finished second in the league with 24 stolen bases in 28 attempts. Kipnis primarily played center field, but played all outfield positions and second base; he batted leadoff part of the time. In 2008, Kipnis became the second Arizona State player to win the American Baseball Coaches Association (ABCA) Pacific-10 Conference Newcomer of the Year. (Teammate Ike Davis earned the award two years earlier.) Kipnis was named second-team All-America by the ABCA and named third-team All-American outfielder by Baseball America. In May 2008, he won the Pacific-10 Player of the Week award. In June, the San Diego Padres drafted Kipnis during the fourth round of the 2008 Major League Baseball draft. However, Kipnis opted to remain in college at Arizona State, becoming the seventh-highest player in the draft who chose not to sign. He decided not to sign with the Padres because he felt he hadn't fully matured and accomplished everything in college. Regarding Kipnis' success, Arizona State coach Pat Murphy observed: "I love that kid. He's tough as nails, and really hard on himself." Moreover, Paul DePodesta, San Diego Padres front office assistant and former Los Angeles Dodgers general manager, described him as "a pesky player who is a very tough out, hitting the ball to all fields and running the bases aggressively ... [who] plays very hard and is surprisingly strong." In the summer of 2008, Kipnis played for the Cotuit Kettleers in the Cape Cod League, a collegiate summer baseball league located on Cape Cod in Massachusetts.

In 2009, Kipnis was the team's leadoff hitter and batted .384 with a .500 on-base percentage and a .709 slugging percentage. He finished with 16 home runs, 71 RBIs, 27 steals in 33 attempts, 51 walks and 32 strikeouts. The National Collegiate Baseball Writers Association (NCBWA), Baseball America, and Collegiate Baseball named Kipnis the Pac-10 Conference Player of the Year, a Pac-10 Conference All-Star outfielder, and a First Team College All-American outfielder. Rivals.com rated Kipnis the number one outfielder in the nation.

Over two seasons, Kipnis batted .378 with 30 home runs, 144 RBIs, 142 runs, 37 doubles, 10 triples, and 51 stolen bases in 474 at bats for the Sun Devils.

== Professional career ==
=== Minor leagues ===
The Cleveland Indians drafted Kipnis in the second round (63rd overall) of the 2009 Major League Baseball draft, and he received a signing bonus of $575,000. In 2009, the first-year minor leaguer batted .306 for the Mahoning Valley Scrappers of the Short-Season A classification New York–Penn League, playing left and center field. While Kipnis appeared to be a good prospect as an outfielder, the Indians saw his potential as a second baseman. Kipnis felt he would have more success in the majors at second base, particularly because of Cleveland's difficulties at that position in recent years. Baseball America ranked him the fifth-best player in the league. During this time, Baseball Prospectus rated him the Indians' eighth-best prospect, describing Kipnis as "fitting great baseball intelligence, a lot of intensity, and surprising tools into a small package. He works the count extremely well and makes consistently hard contact, and he has some surprising pop for his size."

In 2010, Kipnis batted .300 for the Kinston Indians of the Carolina League. Kipnis was promoted from Kinston to the Akron Aeros of the AA Eastern League on June 10, 2010. He hit .311 for the Aeros and won the Aeros Player of the Week Award twice. Baseball America ranked Kipnis the ninth-best prospect in the Eastern League. At the same time, Kipnis made a successful conversion to second base.

He joined the AAA Columbus Clippers for their playoffs. Kipnis batted .455 in five games, and hit for the cycle on September 17 in the Clippers’ victory that clinched the International League title. His big game was voted second in the 2010 Fans Choice "Best Game" Minor League Baseball Yearly Awards. Veteran catcher Luke Carlin said:

They bring up Kipnis from Akron, and we look at this little guy and say, 'Where did he come from, and what is he doing here?' We were teasing him, and all he does is go out and hit about a million. I mean, here's this little infielder and they put him in the fifth spot ... What's that about? He goes out and hits for the cycle.

For 2010, Kipnis led the Indians minor league system in hits (159) and runs (96). He finished tied for third in triples (8), fourth in doubles (32), and tied for fifth in both home runs (16) and RBIs (74). He batted a combined .313. He was named the Indians' 2010 Minor League Player of the Year (the "Lou Boudreau Award"), and was named a 2010 Baseball America Minor League All-Star.

After the 2010 season, Kipnis played for the Peoria Javelinas in the Arizona Fall League. He batted .296 and tied for fifth in the league in RBIs (19). He was named to the Arizona Fall League Rising Stars Game, and he wrote a blog for MLB.com during his time in the league. Baseball Prospectus ranked him as Cleveland's top prospect.

Baseball Prospectus 2011 reported that Kipnis was "a compact athlete who works the count, and consistently barrels up balls with enough power for 15–20 home runs annually in the big leagues." Indians Manager Manny Acta described him as: "a blue collar, dirt bag, run-through-a-wall, relentless type of guy." Writer John Sickels said Kipnis is "quite strong and has plenty of bat speed. His feel for the strike zone is impressive, and he has no problem generating power. He seems to handle both fastballs and breaking stuff well, makes adjustments, and can handle left-handed pitching just fine."

Baseball Prospectus ranked him as the 28th-highest prospect in baseball (".300 hitter, with 12–18 home runs") and the best in the organization. Jim Bowden ranked him the 39th-best prospect in baseball, saying, "He made great progress defensively this past year, and there is no doubt he should be a .300, 15 HR, 70 RBI type offensive 2B in the future". Baseball America initially ranked him as the 54th-best prospect in baseball, the second-best second base prospect and the second-best prospect in the Indians organization. By midseason, the publication ranked him 31st-best in the minors.

In 2011, Kipnis was named the Indians Minor League Player of the Week for June 26 – July 2, after batting .500 with two home runs and a .581 on-base percentage. At that point in the season, Kipnis was 11-for-11 in stolen base attempts and was leading the International League in runs scored (60) and triples (9). At that time he was also second in OPS (.914), fourth in slugging percentage (.525), fifth in on-base percentage (.389), tied for sixth in RBIs (50), tied for seventh in hits (90), twelfth in average (.305), tied for fifteenth in stolen bases (11), and tied for nineteenth in home runs (11). On July 4, Kipnis was named the International League Player of the Week.

Kipnis represented the Cleveland Indians in the 2011 All-Star Futures Game on July 10, hitting a 95-mph fastball for a home run when he led off the bottom of the first inning for the United States. Kipnis also was named to the International League All-Star team, and he doubled and walked in the game on July 13.

On July 22, 2011, Kipnis was called up from the Clippers to the Cleveland Indians. At the time, he was leading the International league in triples (9), was second in runs scored (64), seventh in total bases (164), tied for tenth in walks (44), twelfth in RBIs (55), and seventeenth in stolen bases (12 in 13 attempts).

=== Cleveland Indians ===
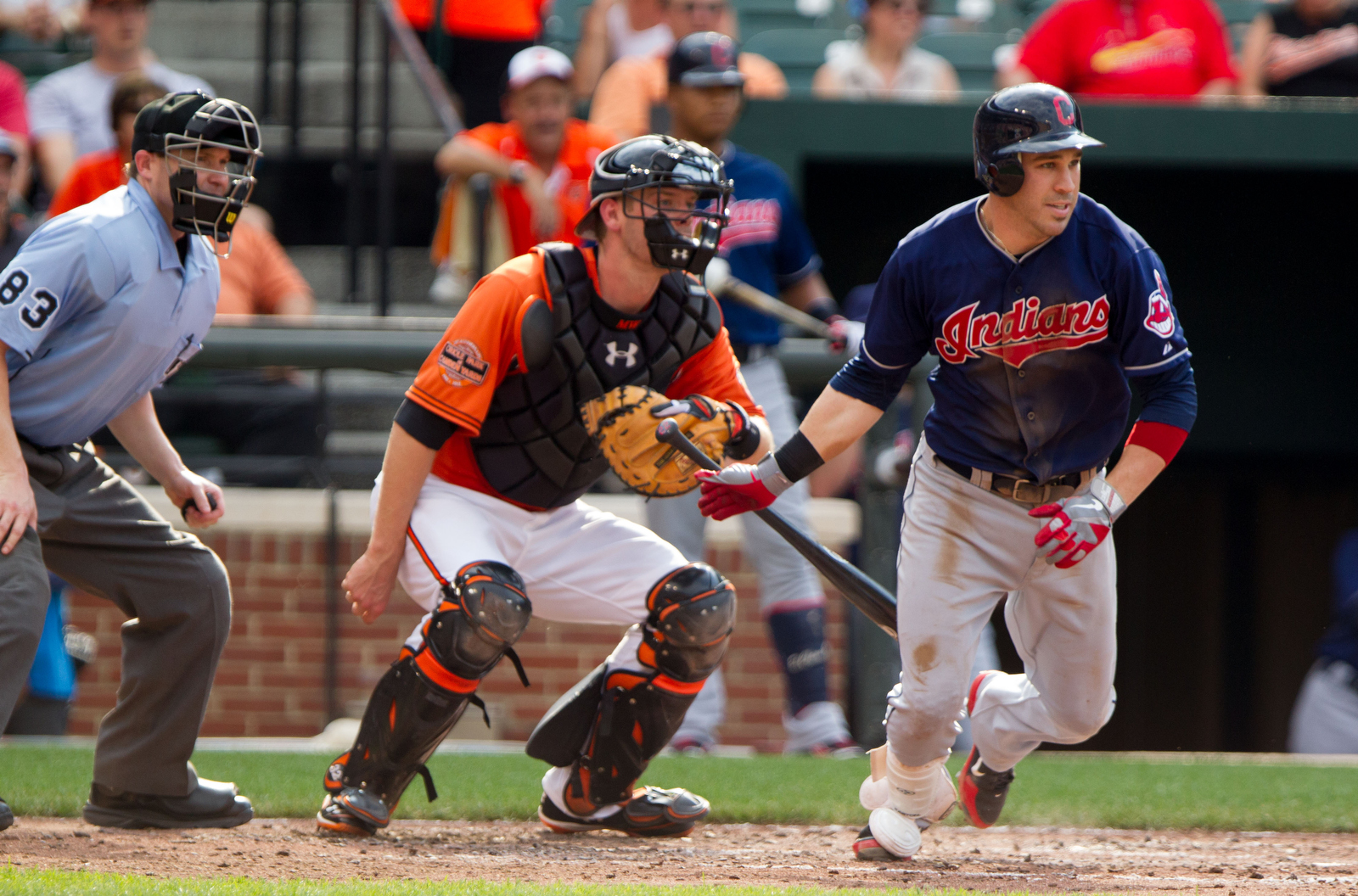
Kipnis in a game against the Baltimore Orioles in 2012

Kipnis made his major league debut on July 22, 2011, starting at second base against the Chicago White Sox. His first career hit came in his next game three days later on July 25, 2011 – a game-winning walk-off single with the bases loaded and two outs in the ninth inning against the Los Angeles Angels of Anaheim. On August 3, 2011, Kipnis became the first Indians second baseman to hit a home run in four consecutive games, and the only Indian other than former Indians MVP Al Rosen to do so in his rookie year. It was the first time in major league history that a player had homered in four consecutive games within two weeks of his major league debut. On August 10, Kipnis had a five-hit, four-run game, the first time a rookie had done so since Jim Fridley in 1952. In 2011, he played 36 games in the major leagues and batted .272 with seven home runs and 19 RBIs.

Jason Kipnis got the Opening Day starting job at second base for 2012. On May 3, 2012, in a game against the Chicago White Sox, Kipnis had a triple, home run, and a career-high four RBIs in a 7–5 Indians victory. On June 1, Kipnis hit his first major league grand slam off Minnesota Twins' starting pitcher Carl Pavano. Kipnis played 152 games in 2012, batting .257 with 14 home runs and 76 RBIs, and finished tied for 6th in the American League in steals (with 31).

In the 2013 season Kipnis continued to improve over his 2012 performance, winning the Player of the Week honor twice in the month of June. Kipnis batted .419 in June, with an OPS of 1.216, in addition to stealing 9 bases in 10 attempts. He was also named the American League Player of the Month for June. Kipnis was later named a member of the 2013 American League All Star team. In 2013, he finished among AL leaders in sacrifice flies (tied for 2nd, with 10), walks (tied for 7th, with 76), and steals (tied for 9th, with 30).

Kipnis signed a 6-year, $52.5 million contract with the Indians on April 4, 2014.

In May 2015 Kipnis broke the Indians team record for the most hits in a single month with 51 total hits. He also ended the month with 30 runs which made him one of three people ever in the MLB to have 50+ hits and 30+ runs in the month of May. He was only behind Ty Cobb and Al Simmons.

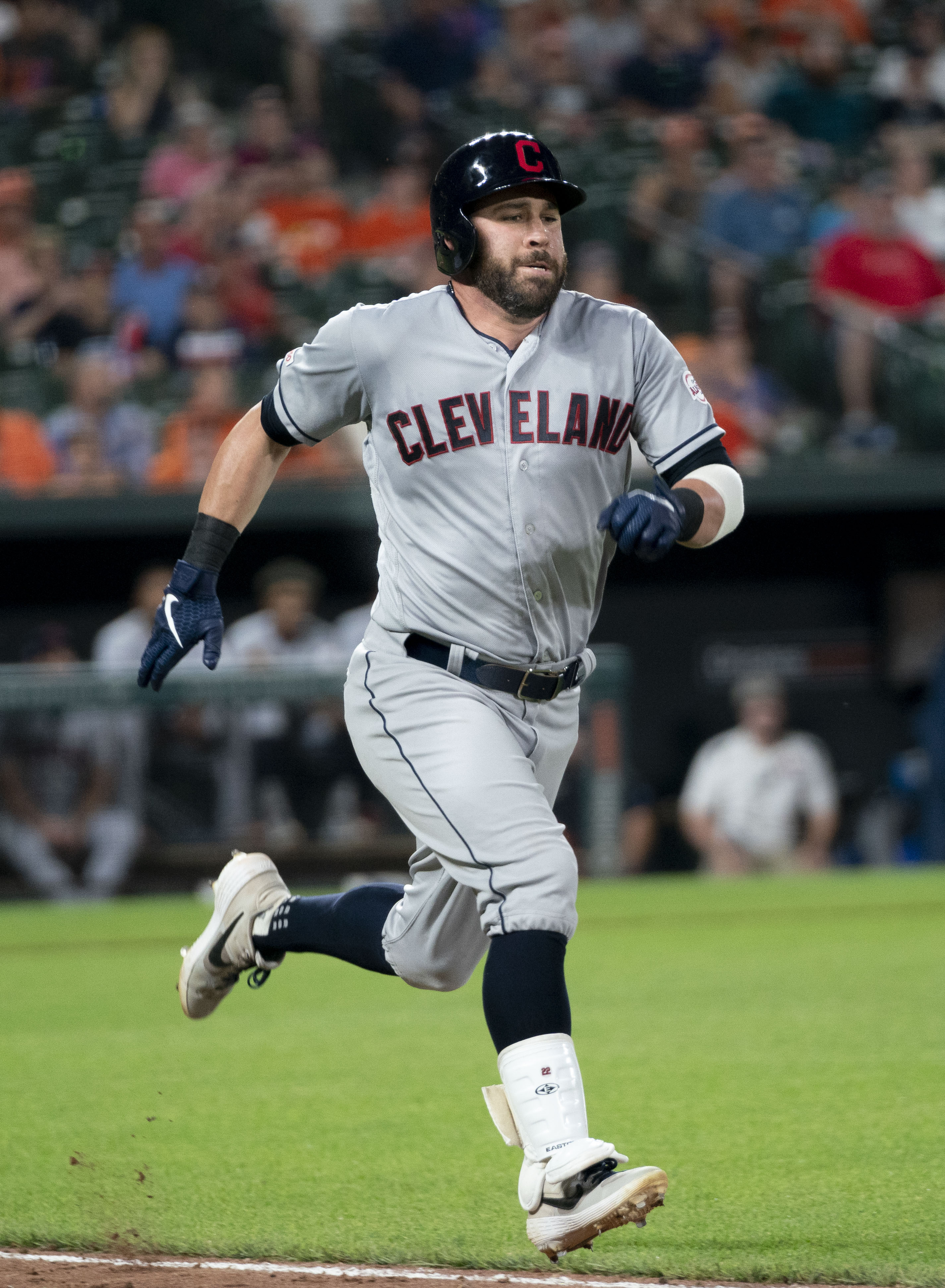
Kipnis in 2019

On June 1, Kipnis was voted the AL Player of the Month for May.

On July 9, Kipnis was placed on the disabled list with a hamstring injury. He would be activated on August 6 but would continue to feel discomfort in the hamstring. On August 23, 2017, Kipnis was placed back on the 10-day disabled list due to a hamstring injury.

On September 19, 2018, Kipnis hit a walk-off grand slam for his 1,000th career hit against the Chicago White Sox. With that hit, Kipnis became the first Cleveland Indians player to have 1,000 hits, 100 homeruns, and 100 stolen bases for his career.

On September 17, 2019, the Indians announced that Kipnis suffered a broken right hamate bone which required surgery to remove. The injury ended his season after hitting .245/.304/.410/.715 with 17 home runs and 65 RBI.

On October 31, 2019, the Indians announced they had declined their club option on Kipnis' contract for the 2020 season, making Kipnis a free agent.

=== Chicago Cubs ===
On February 18, 2020, Kipnis signed a minor league contract with the Chicago Cubs. The deal included an invitation to the Cubs' 2020 major league spring training camp. On July 17, 2020, Kipnis was selected to the 40-man roster. During the shortened 2020 season, Kipnis hit .237/.341/.404 in 44 games.

=== Atlanta Braves ===
On February 15, 2021, Kipnis signed a minor league contract with the Atlanta Braves organization that included an invitation to Spring Training. On March 27, 2021, Kipnis was released by the Braves. On March 29, Kipnis re-signed with the Braves on a new minor league contract. Kipnis played in 59 games for the Triple-A Gwinnett Stripers, hitting .290/.390/.518 with 10 home runs and 32 RBI's. On November 11, 2021, Kipnis was released by the Braves.

On February 20, 2023, Kipnis announced his retirement from professional baseball.

On August 10, 2024, Kipnis appeared in a Savannah Bananas game, as an honorary Banana in front of a sold-out Progressive Field, and received a standing ovation. He hit a single in the third inning.

== Personal life ==
Kipnis is a practicing Catholic, though he self-identifies as Jewish due to his father's Jewish ancestry.

Kipnis is in a relationship with Ohio native, Alyssa Huntzinger, as seen most recently on his social media posts. They have been linked together since late 2025.

Kipnis has been nicknamed "Dirtbag", since he is prone to getting his uniform dirty during the course of a game. Former Indians manager Manny Acta affectionately used the term when speaking about Kipnis in public.
