= Raúl González (baseball) =

Puerto Rican baseball player (born 1973)

- Outfielder
- Born: December 27, 1973 (age 52); Santurce, Puerto Rico
- Batted: Right Threw: Right

MLB debut
- May 25, 2000, for the Chicago Cubs

Last MLB appearance
- June 21, 2004, for the Cleveland Indians

MLB statistics
- Batting average: .233
- Home runs: 5
- Runs batted in: 33
- Stats at Baseball Reference

Teams
- Chicago Cubs (2000); Cincinnati Reds (2001–2002); New York Mets (2002–2003); Cleveland Indians (2004)

Victor Raúl González (born December 27, 1973) is a Puerto Rican former professional baseball outfielder, and current manager for the Mahoning Valley Scrappers. He batted and threw right-handed.

== Professional career ==
Drafted by the Kansas City Royals in the 17th round of the 1990 Major League Baseball draft, González made his major league debut for the Chicago Cubs on May 25, 2000. In 2007, he played for the New York Mets' Triple-A affiliate, the New Orleans Zephyrs where he batted .279 in 17 games before being released. He then signed with the independent Newark Bears of the Atlantic League. He hit .313 with Newark with 8 home runs and 35 RBI.

Following the arrest of Major League Baseball player, Miguel Cabrera, on February 15, 2010, González was chosen as Cabrera's "companion" in order to help the slugger abstain from alcohol and other such activities detrimental to his baseball career. González was reported by Fox Sports to be going to be with Cabrera "all year long" to ensure he stays on track.

== Coaching career ==
On May 19, 2026, the Mahoning Valley Scrappers, an MLB Draft League team, and former Cleveland Indians affiliate based out of Niles, Ohio hired Gonzalez as their new manager.
