= Lonnie Chisenhall =

American baseball player (born 1988)

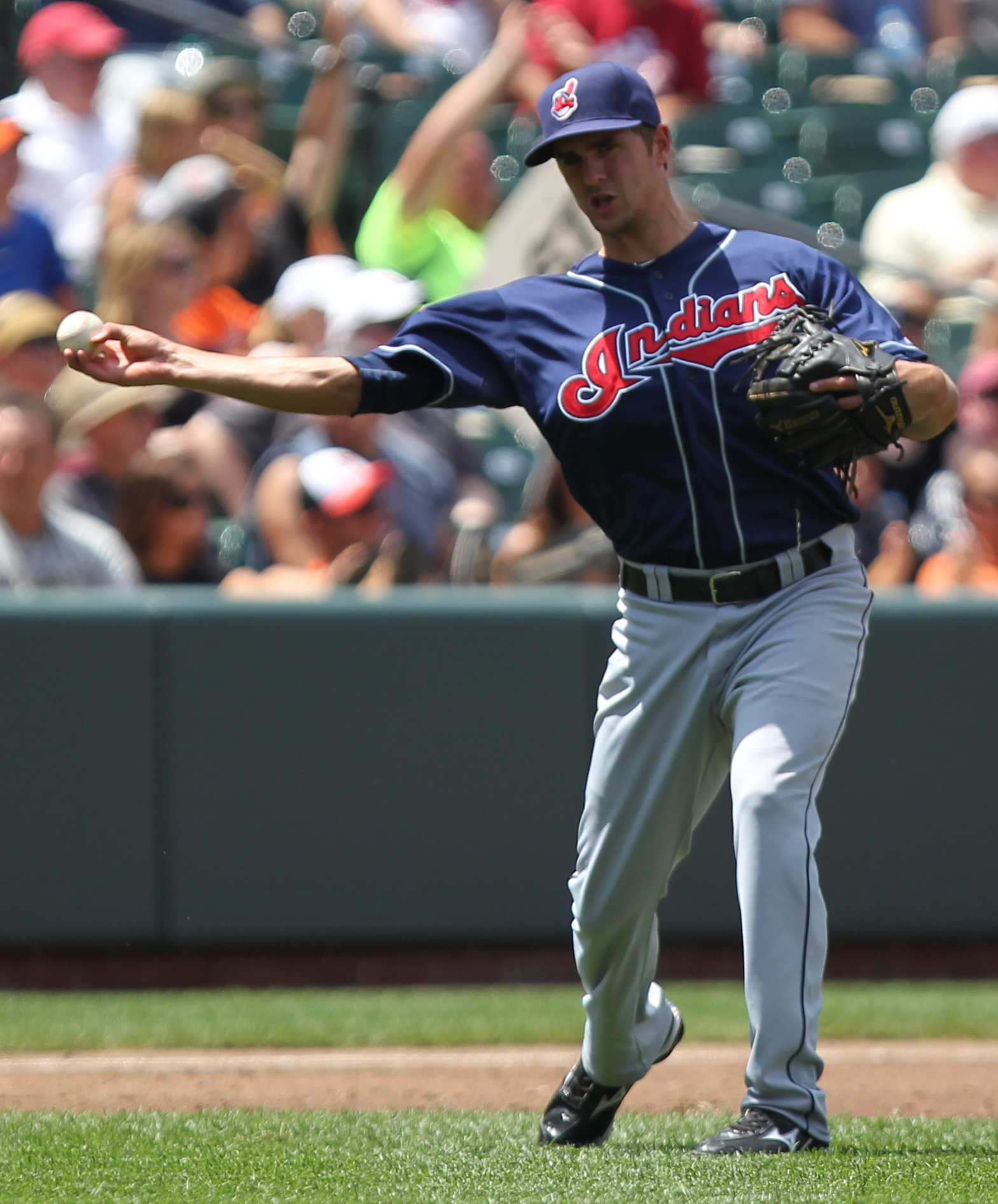
- Chisenhall with the Cleveland Indians in 2011
- Third baseman / Right fielder
- Born: October 4, 1988 (age 37); Morehead City, North Carolina, U.S.
- Batted: Left Threw: Right

MLB debut
- June 27, 2011, for the Cleveland Indians

Last MLB appearance
- July 1, 2018, for the Cleveland Indians

MLB statistics
- Batting average: .268
- Home runs: 64
- Runs batted in: 296
- Stats at Baseball Reference

Teams
- Cleveland Indians (2011–2018)

Lonnie David Chisenhall (born October 4, 1988) is an American former professional baseball third baseman and outfielder. He played in Major League Baseball (MLB) for the Cleveland Indians. He made his MLB debut with the Indians in June 2011 while playing third base. Chisenhall transitioned to right field later in his career.

== Amateur career ==
Chisenhall attended West Carteret High School in Morehead City, North Carolina, graduating in 2006. He was drafted by the Pittsburgh Pirates in the 11th round of the 2006 Major League Baseball draft but chose to attend the University of South Carolina. Chisenhall played for the South Carolina Gamecocks baseball team in his freshman year, but was dismissed from the team after being charged with breaking into a dorm room and stealing electronic equipment. He then transferred to Pitt Community College.

== Professional career ==
=== Cleveland Indians ===
The Cleveland Indians chose Chisenhall with the 29th overall pick in the 2008 MLB draft. He played 68 games in 2008 for the Indians Class A Short Season Affiliate the Mahoning Valley Scrappers posting a .290 AVG with 5 HR and 45 RBI. In 2009 and 2010, he played with the AA Akron Aeros.

On June 27, 2011, Chisenhall was promoted from the Class AAA Columbus Clippers, and went 2-for-4 in his major league debut against the Arizona Diamondbacks. On July 6, 2011, Chisenhall hit his first major league home run off of Boone Logan of the New York Yankees. On July 7, 2011, Chisenhall was hit with a fastball thrown by Toronto Blue Jays pitcher Carlos Villanueva and had to leave the game with facial contusions.

In 2012, he finished with a .260 batting average, 12 home runs, and 38 runs batted in. On May 13, 2013, Chisenhall was sent down to the Class AAA Columbus Clippers. He was recalled on May 18. On June 9, 2014, Chisenhall became the first player in MLB history to have 5 hits, 3 home runs, and 9 RBI in 5 plate appearances. He is no longer the only such player. On June 6, 2017, Scooter Gennett had a better performance with 5 hits, 4 home runs, and 10 RBI in 5 plate appearances.

In 2015, Chisenhall started out as the Indians everyday third baseman. On June 10, after poor offensive output, Lonnie was again optioned to Cleveland's Class AAA Columbus Clippers. Giovanny Urshela was called on to play third base for the Indians. While in Columbus, Chisenhall transitioned to right field. On July 29, Chisenhall was recalled to the Indians roster. Called on as a full-time right fielder, his transition was deemed a success by many.

In Game 2 of the 2017 American League Division Series, with the Indians down 8–3 in the 6th inning with two outs and runners on 2nd and 3rd against the Yankees and the count 0–2 on Chisenhall, Yankees reliever Chad Green threw an inside pitch that grazed the bottom of Chisenhall's bat. The home plate umpire called it a hit by pitch, awarding Chisenhall 1st base and bringing up Indians slugger Francisco Lindor with the bases loaded. Replay showed that the ball did not actually hit Chisenhall, but Yankees manager Joe Girardi decided not to challenge the call. On the second pitch he saw, Lindor hit a grand slam to right field, bringing the Indians within a run. The Indians would go on to tie the game in the 8th and walk off in the 13th. He began the 2018 season on the disabled list and was activated on June 5, 2018. He was placed back on the disabled list less than a month later. Chisenhall became a free agent following the 2018 season.

=== Pittsburgh Pirates ===
On November 27, 2018, Chisenhall signed a one-year contract with the Pittsburgh Pirates worth $2.75 million. He was placed on the injured list at the end of Spring training after sustaining an injury to his finger. He never played a game for the Pirates.

On February 21, 2020, Chisenhall announced his retirement from professional baseball.

== Personal life ==
Chisenhall and his wife, Meredith, have two sons and one daughter.
