= David Wallace (catcher) =

American baseball player and manager (born 1979)

David Huggins Wallace (born October 17, 1979 in Brentwood, Tennessee), is an American former professional baseball catcher and coach. He was the manager of the Akron RubberDucks, the Double-A level minor-league affiliate of then Cleveland Indians. He was also the catching coordinator within then Indians system, working on the major league staff in 2009 and 2010.

From 1998 to 2000, Wallace was a two-sport athlete at Vanderbilt University, playing both football, as a backup quarterback, and baseball, as a catcher. Wallace decided to concentrate on baseball in 2001 and did not play football. From 2002 to 2008, Wallace played in Minor League Baseball with the Mahoning Valley Scrappers, Lake County Captains, Kinston Indians, Akron Aeros, Buffalo Bisons all within the Cleveland Indians' farm system. He also played for the Columbus Clippers, then affiliated with the Washington Nationals.
