= Tony Sipp =

American baseball player (born 1983)

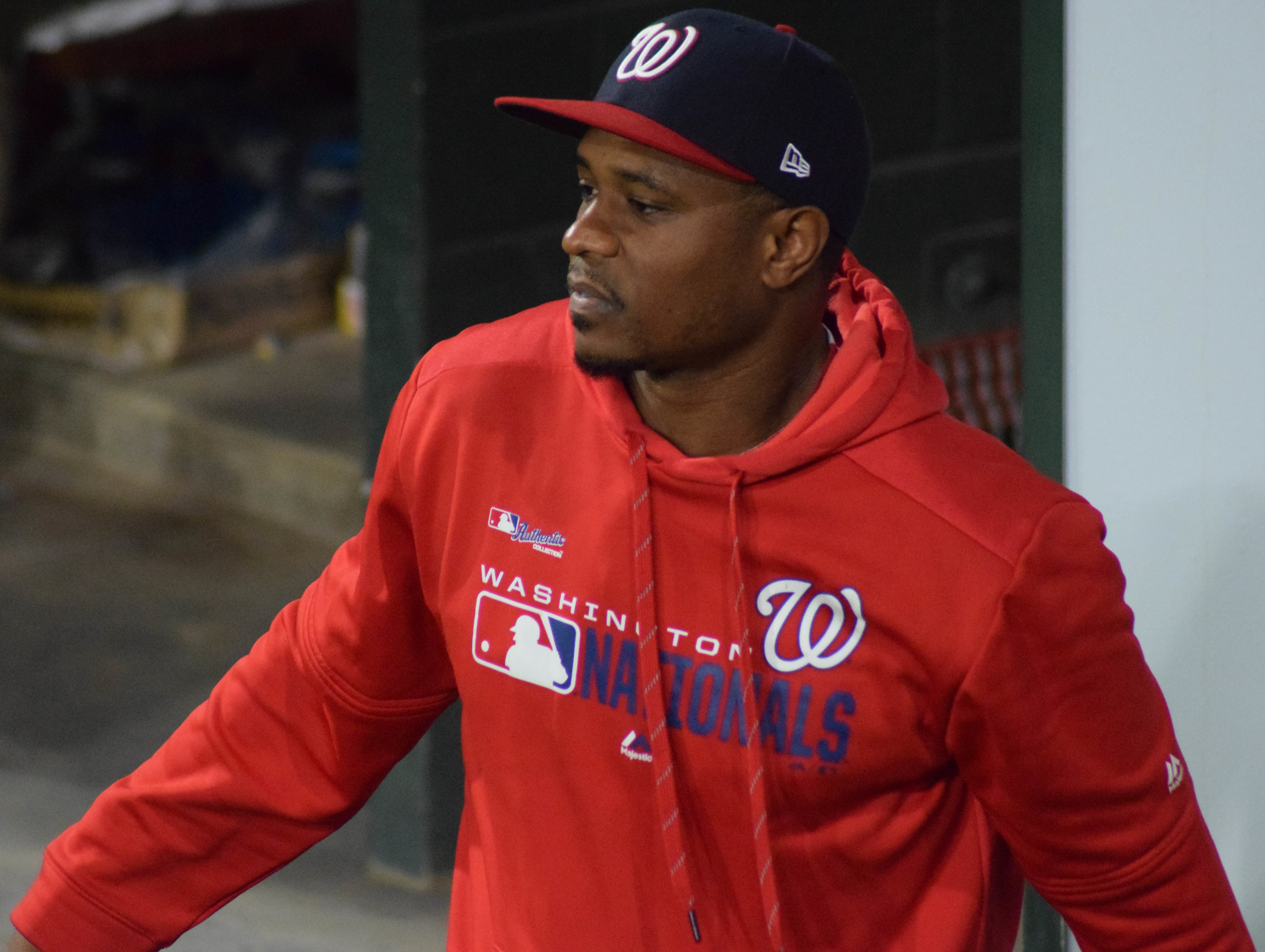
- Sipp with the Nationals in 2019
- Pitcher
- Born: July 12, 1983 (age 43); Pascagoula, Mississippi, U.S.
- Batted: Left Threw: Left

MLB debut
- April 22, 2009, for the Cleveland Indians

Last MLB appearance
- July 30, 2019, for the Washington Nationals

MLB statistics
- Win–loss record: 26–22
- Earned run average: 3.72
- Strikeouts: 531
- Stats at Baseball Reference

Teams
- Cleveland Indians (2009–2012); Arizona Diamondbacks (2013); Houston Astros (2014–2018); Washington Nationals (2019)

Tony Marcel Sipp (born July 12, 1983) is an American former professional baseball relief pitcher. He played in Major League Baseball (MLB) for the Cleveland Indians, Arizona Diamondbacks, Houston Astros, and Washington Nationals.

== Amateur career ==
Born in Pascagoula, Mississippi, Sipp graduated from Moss Point High School in Moss Point, Mississippi, where he also competed in football, winning a state title with the team in 2000. In baseball, Sipp also helped Moss Point High reach the state championship in baseball. Sipp and fellow major leaguer Joey Butler formerly played against one another, as they are both from Jackson County, Mississippi. Sipp played for Mississippi Gulf Coast Community College, and also attended Okaloosa-Walton College, before transferring to Clemson University. In 2003, he played collegiate summer baseball with the Wareham Gatemen of the Cape Cod Baseball League, and returned to the league in 2004 to play for the Cotuit Kettleers.

== Professional career ==
=== Cleveland Indians ===
After being drafted by the Cleveland Indians in the 45th round of the 2004 Major League Baseball draft. Sipp made his professional debut in 2004 with the Low-A Mahoning Valley Scrappers, logging a 3–1 record and 3.16 ERA in 10 appearances. He split the 2005 season between the Single-A Lake County Captains and the High-A Kinston Indians, posting a 6–3 record and 2.40 ERA in 35 games between the two teams. In 2006, he played for the Double-A Akron Aeros, recording a 4–2 record and 3.13 ERA with 80 strikeouts.

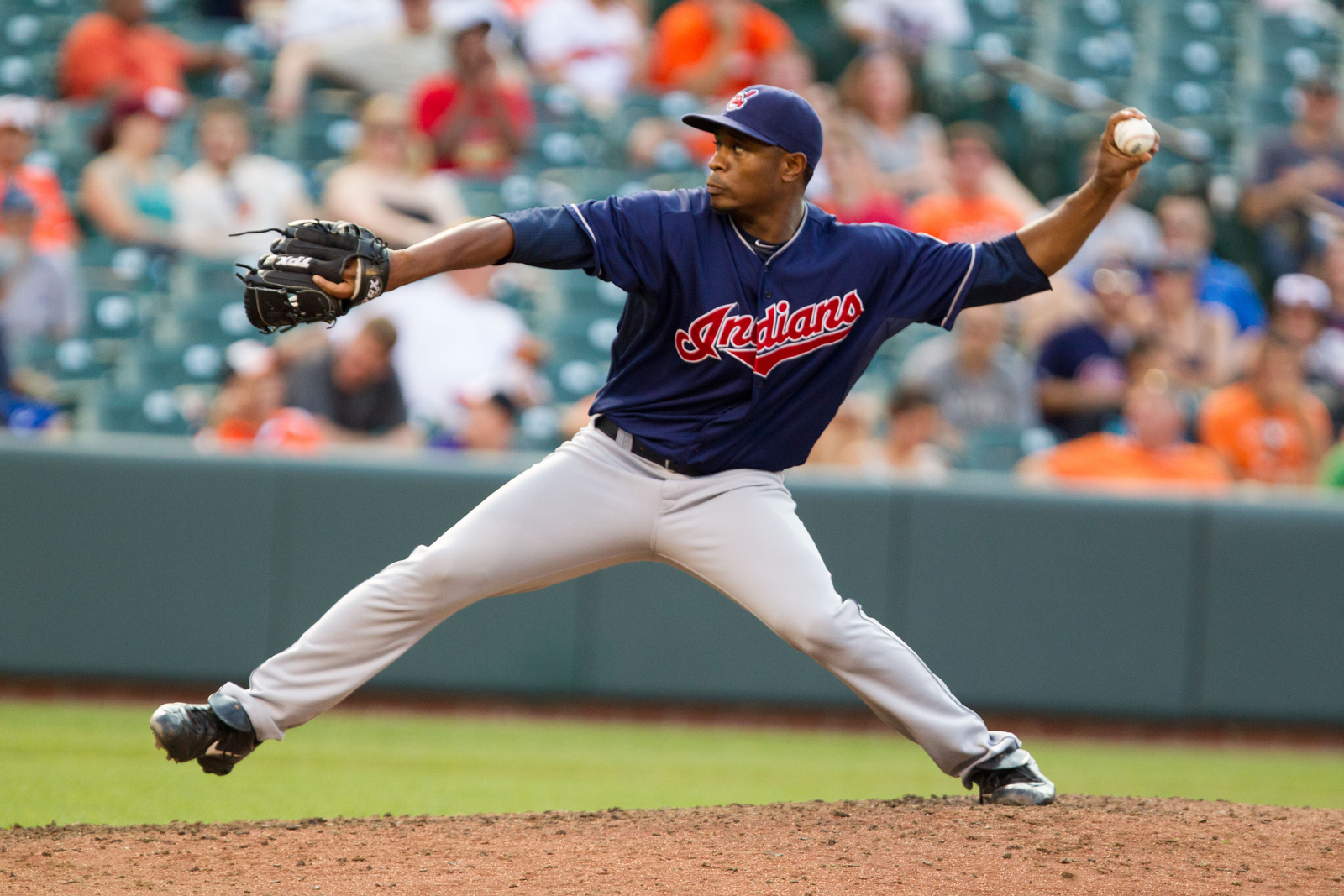
Sipp with the Cleveland Indians in 2012

He made his major league debut on April 22, 2009. Coming out of the bullpen, Sipp went 2–0 with an ERA of 2.92, recording 48 strikeouts. In 2010, Sipp pitched to a 2–2 record and 4.14 ERA in 70 appearances with Cleveland. The next year, he logged a 6–3 record and 3.03 ERA in 69 games. He pitched in 63 games for Cleveland in 2012, recording a 1–2 record and 4.42 ERA with 51 strikeouts in 55.0 innings of work.

In 4 years in the Indians bullpen, he appeared in 248 games and recorded 167 holds, striking out 225 batters and recording a 3.68 ERA.

=== Arizona Diamondbacks ===
On December 12, 2012, Sipp was acquired by the Arizona Diamondbacks in a nine-player three-team blockbuster trade that sent Shin-Soo Choo to the Cincinnati Reds. He was designated for assignment on August 4, 2013, after pitching to a 3–2 record and 4.78 ERA in 56 games. He became a free agent on November 27, 2013.

=== San Diego Padres ===
On February 7, 2014, Sipp signed a minor league deal with the San Diego Padres organization. He was assigned to the Triple-A El Paso Chihuahuas to begin the season but was released on May 1 after pitching to a 4.30 ERA in 11 appearances.

=== Houston Astros ===
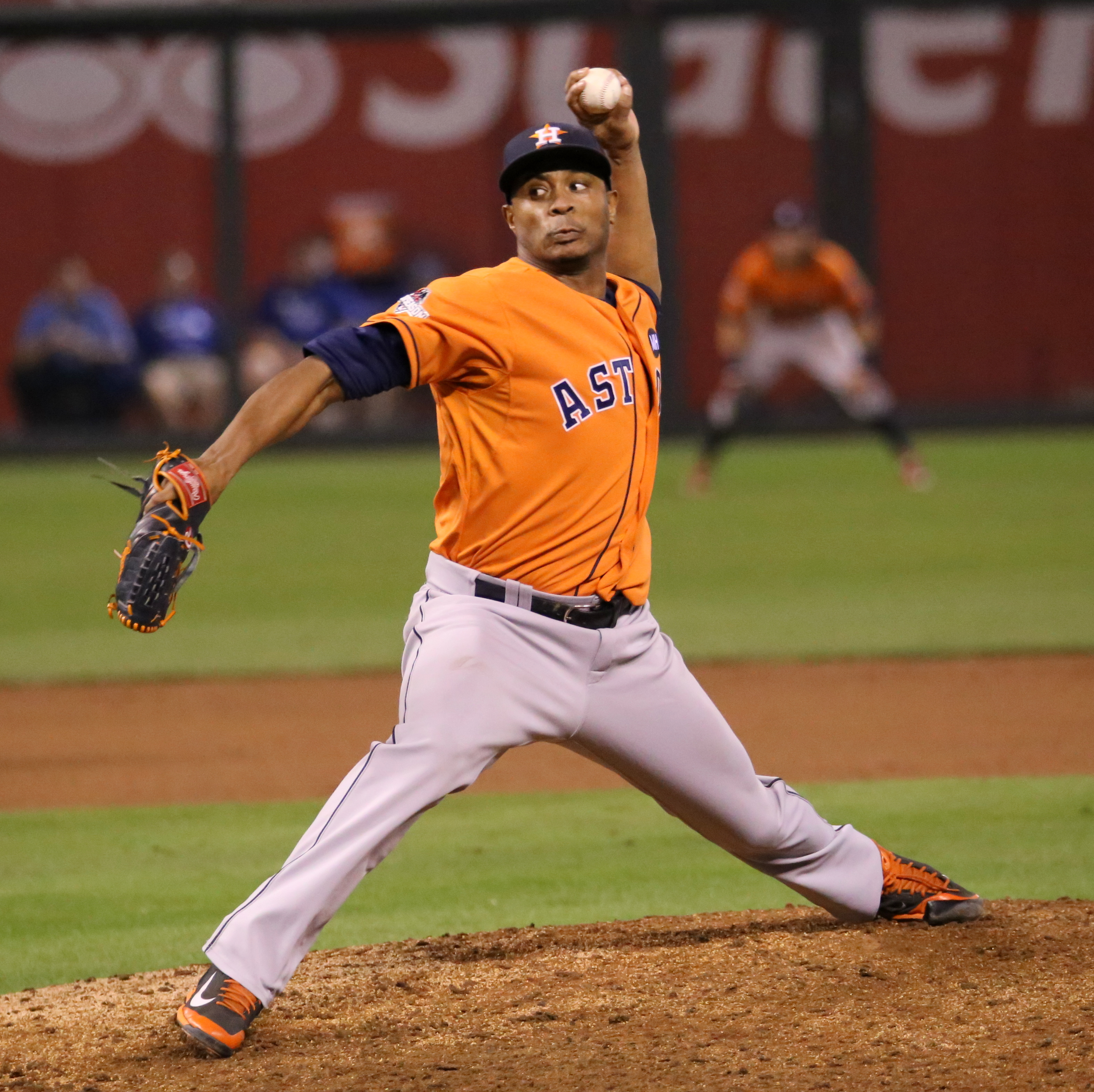
Sipp pitching for the Houston Astros in 2015 American League Division Series Game 1

On May 2, 2014, Sipp signed a major league deal with the Houston Astros. Sipp became a key component of the Astros' bullpen for the remainder of the 2014 season, posting a 2.94 xFIP and striking out 11.19 batters per nine innings of work.

On December 11, 2015, the Astros re-signed Sipp to a 3-year, $18 million contract. Sipp made 60 appearances for the Astros in 2016, pitching to a 4.95 ERA with 40 strikeouts in 43.2 innings of work.

In 2017, Sipp made 46 appearances out of the bullpen and finished the season 0–1 with a 5.79 ERA. The Astros finished 2017 with a 101–61 record, giving them an AL West pennant clincher. Sipp did not see any sort of postseason action, but was still on the 40-man roster at the time, as the Astros won the 2017 World Series. In 2018 with Houston, Sipp posted a 3–1 record and stellar 1.86 ERA with 42 strikeouts in 38.2 innings pitched. He became a free agent following the season.

=== Washington Nationals ===
On March 14, 2019, Sipp signed a one-year, $1 million deal with the Washington Nationals. The deal included a mutual option for the 2020 season. On June 7, Sipp hit 10 years of major league service time. He was designated for assignment on August 2 after posting an ERA of 4.71 in 36 appearances. He was released shortly afterwards. Reports involving the Houston Astros sign stealing scandal state that prior to the 2019 World Series Nationals ace Max Scherzer reached out to Sipp and asked if the Nationals needed to be concerned about the Astros even with no runners on base, to which Sipp replied yes.

== Pitching style ==
Sipp throws four pitches: a four-seam fastball (91-94 mph), a two-seam fastball (89–91), a slider (79–82), and a changeup to right-handed hitters (78–81). The slider is his most common two-strike pitch.
