= Mike Sarbaugh =

American baseball coach (born 1967)

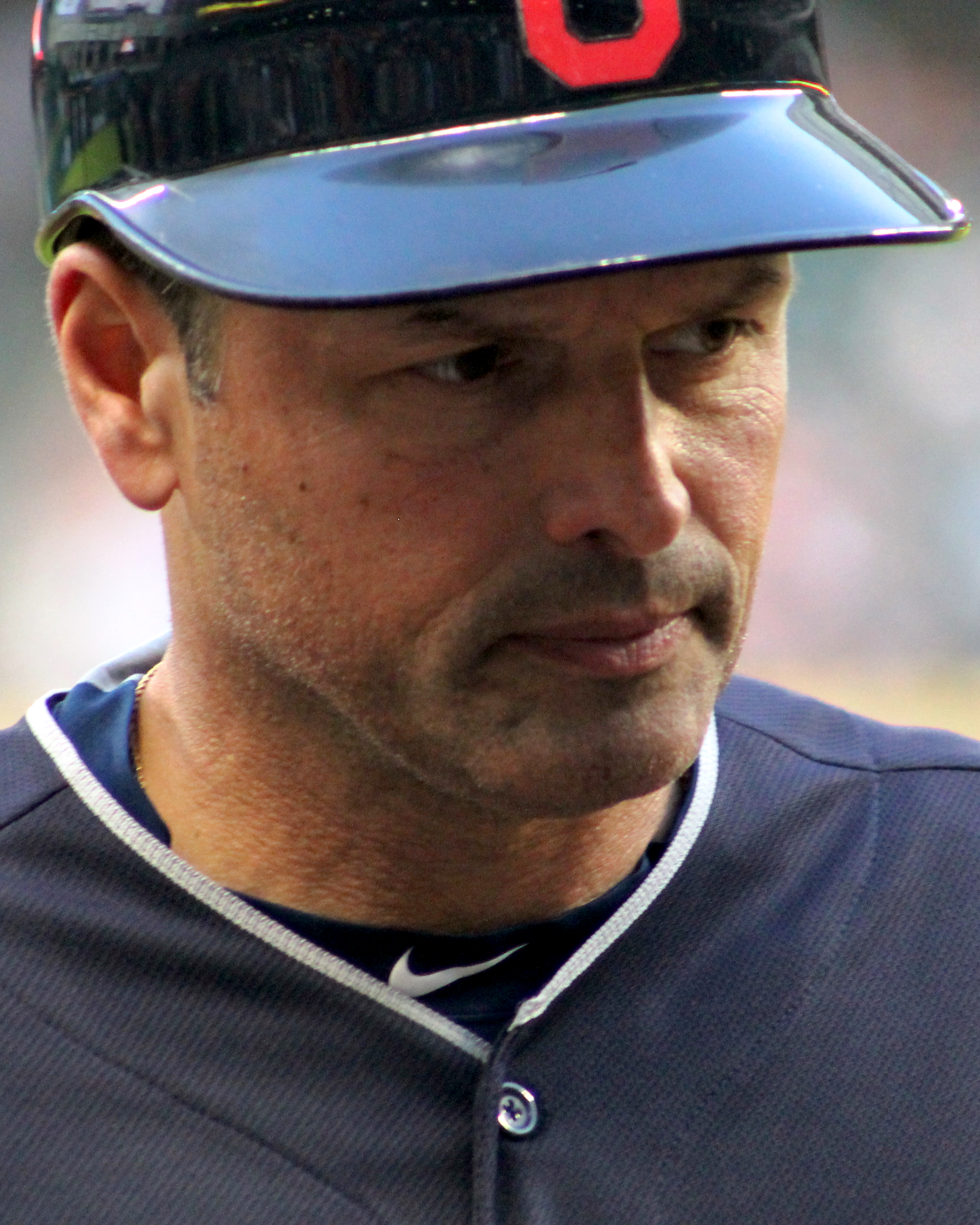
- Sarbaugh with the Cleveland Guardians
- Third base coach
- Born: April 25, 1967 (age 59); Lancaster, Pennsylvania, U.S.
- Bats: Right Throws: Right
- Stats at Baseball Reference

Teams
- Cleveland Indians / Guardians (2013–2023); New York Mets (2024–2025)

James Michael Sarbaugh (born April 25, 1967) is an American baseball coach who most recently served as the third base coach for the New York Mets of Major League Baseball (MLB). He is a former minor league baseball player and minor league manager for the Columbus Clippers, the Triple-A farm team of the Guardians. He also served as the third base/infielders coach for the Cleveland Indians/Guardians from 2013 to 2023.

== Career ==
=== Playing ===
Sarbaugh attended Lamar University, where he was an all-conference shortstop, graduating with a degree in kinesiology.

Sarbaugh played six seasons in the minors, beginning with the Helena Brewers in 1989, then was in the Cleveland Indians' system from 1990 to 1994, where he won a Carolina League championship as a member of the 1991 Kinston Indians. In 1995, he was a replacement player during the ongoing strike for Cleveland during spring training.

=== Coaching ===
Sarbaugh later became a minor league coach, being named the hitting coach for the Kinston Indians in 1995, when the "K-Tribe" won the Carolina League championship. He next moved on to the Columbus RedStixx of the South Atlantic League in 1996 and 1997, then was back to Kinston in 1998 and 1999. He also served as the hitting coach for the Akron Aeros from 2000 to 2003.

In 2004, he was named manager of the Mahoning Valley Scrappers, leading them to a New York–Penn League championship. The next season, he managed the Lake County Captains.

In 2006, he became skipper of the Kinston Indians and won the league championship, making him a Carolina League champion as a player, coach, and manager. His 2006 team was named the Advanced Class A Team of the Year by both Minor League Baseball and Baseball America. He remained the manager in Kinston for the 2007 season and managed the Carolina League team in the California League/Carolina League All-Star Game.

On December 1, 2009, Sarbaugh was named the manager of the Columbus Clippers for the 2010 season. Sarbaugh won both the 2010 and 2011 Triple-A championships with Columbus.

=== Cleveland Indians/Guardians ===
Sarbaugh was named the third base coach/infielders coach for the Cleveland Indians in 2013. During the 2020 season, Sarbaugh filled in as Cleveland's bench coach as Sandy Alomar Jr., the bench coach, filled in for manager Terry Francona, who was away from the team due to a medical condition.

On August 5, 2023, Sarbaugh was ejected for the first time in his MLB career by Mark Wegner for his role in the infamous Jose Ramirez and Tim Anderson fight. The Chicago White Sox defeated their division rivals, 7-4.

On October 31, 2023, the Guardians announced that Sarbaugh would not return for the 2024 season.

=== New York Mets ===
In November 2023, the New York Mets hired Sarbaugh to be their third base coach for the 2024 season. He coached two seasons for the Mets. On October 3, 2025, it was announced that Sarbaugh would not return for the 2026 season.

== Personal life ==
Sarbaugh and his wife Nicole live in Shillington, Pennsylvania, with their three children.

Sarbaugh appeared in the 1994 movie, Major League II (as J Michael Sarbaugh), playing a shortstop for the Pirates.
