= Cord Phelps =

American baseball player (born 1987)

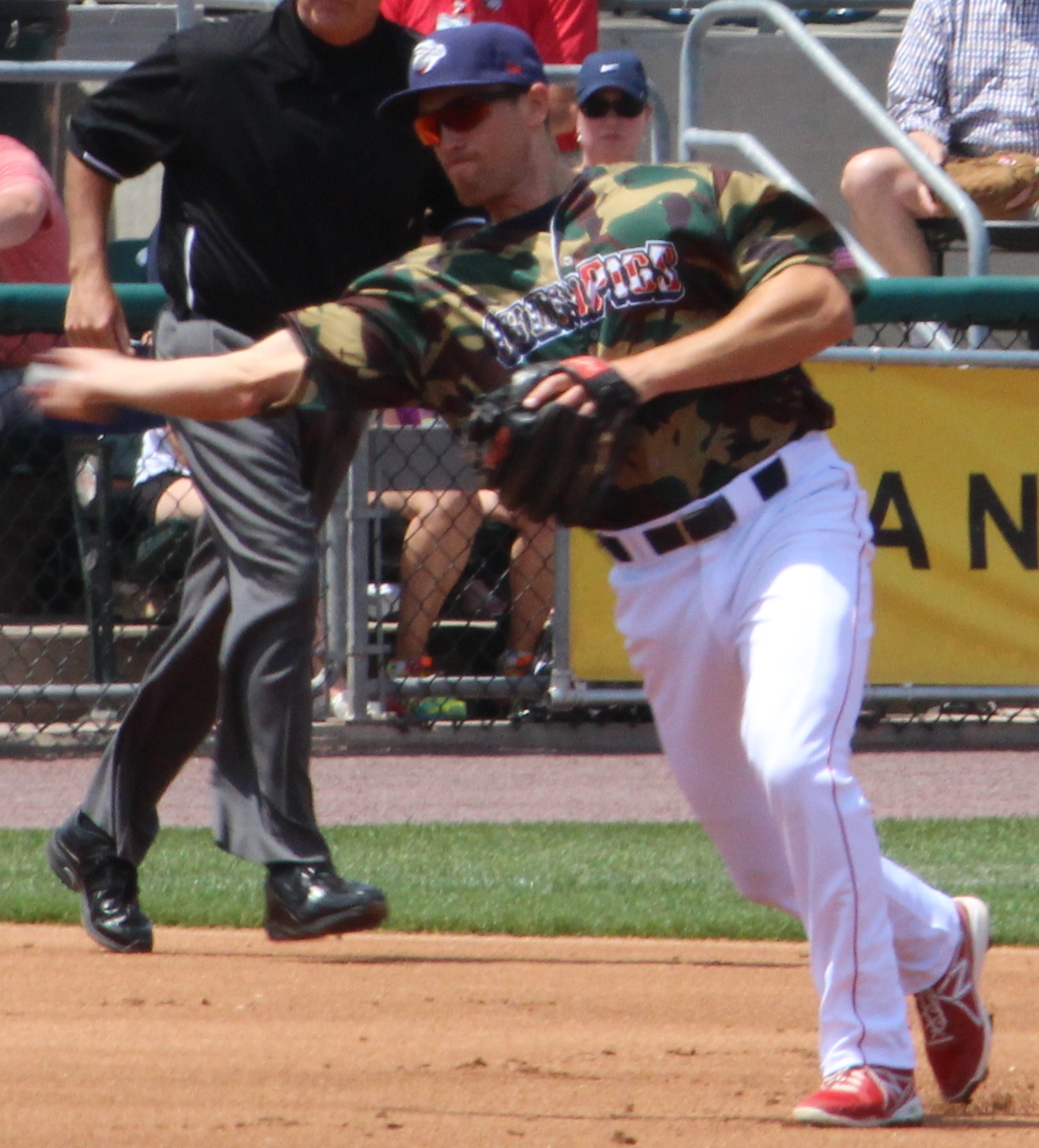
- Phelps with the Lehigh Valley IronPigs in 2015
- Second baseman
- Born: January 23, 1987 (age 39); Stanford, California, U.S.
- Batted: Switch Threw: Right

MLB debut
- June 8, 2011, for the Cleveland Indians

Last appearance
- August 23, 2014, for the Baltimore Orioles

MLB statistics
- Batting average: .155
- Home runs: 2
- Runs batted in: 11
- Stats at Baseball Reference

Teams
- Cleveland Indians (2011–2013); Baltimore Orioles (2014)

Robert Cord Phelps (born January 23, 1987) is an American former professional baseball infielder. He has played in Major League Baseball (MLB) for the Cleveland Indians and Baltimore Orioles.

== Early life ==
Phelps attended Santa Barbara High School and played collegiate baseball for the Stanford Cardinal and spent three years with them. He finished his college career with a .307 batting average and 115 runs scored. The Cleveland Indians selected him in the third round of the 2008 Major League Baseball draft.

== Professional career ==
=== Cleveland Indians ===
Phelps began his professional career with the Mahoning Valley Scrappers for 25 games in 2008, then spent the 2009 season with the Kinston Indians. In 130 games for them, he had a .261 batting average and 17 stolen bases. Phelps split the 2010 season between the Akron Aeros and Columbus Clippers, and had a .317 average with the Clippers in 66 games. He started 2011 with the Clippers, and in 97 games had a .294 average.

Phelps was called up to the majors for the first time on June 8, 2011. On June 19, Phelps hit his first career major league home run, a walk-off in the 11th inning against Pittsburgh Pirates reliever Tim Wood. Phelps played a total of 53 games during his three seasons with the Indians, primarily spending that time with the Clippers. He was designated for assignment on November 20, 2013.

=== Baltimore Orioles ===
Phelps was claimed off waivers by the Baltimore Orioles on November 25, 2013, as part of their attempt to replace Brian Roberts and give themselves depth in the infield. He was slated to begin the 2014 season with the Triple–A Norfolk Tides. On August 24, 2014, after playing in three games for the Orioles, they designated Phelps for assignment, and he returned to Norfolk, where he had spent the 2014 season.

=== Philadelphia Phillies ===
Phelps signed a minor league deal with the Philadelphia Phillies on November 25, 2014. He became a free agent on November 6, 2015.
