= 2008 Eastern League season =

The 2008 Eastern League season began on April 3 and the regular season ended on September 1. The All Star Game was played on July 16 at Merchantsauto.com Stadium in Manchester, New Hampshire. The Playoffs began on September 3 with the Divisional Series. The Akron Aeros defeated the Bowie Baysox in the Southern Division Championship Series and the Trenton Thunder defeated the Portland Sea Dogs in the Northern Division Championship Series. The Trenton Thunder defeated the Akron Aeros to win the Eastern League Championship Series.

== Standings ==
Eastern League North	W	L	Pct.	GB
@ Trenton Thunder	86	54	.614	—
# Portland Sea Dogs	74	66	.529	12
Binghamton Mets	73	69	.514	14
Connecticut Defenders	68	73	.482	18½
New Britain Rock Cats	64	77	.454	22½
New Hampshire Fisher Cats	61	81	.430	26

Eastern League South	W	L	Pct.	GB
# Bowie Baysox	84	58	.592	-
@ Akron Aeros	80	62	.563	4
Harrisburg Senators	73	69	.514	11
Erie SeaWolves	68	74	.479	16
Altoona Curve	65	77	.458	19
Reading Phillies	53	89	.373	31

== Stats ==
=== Batting leaders ===
Stat	Player	Total
AVG	Lou Montañez (BOW)	.335
HR	Lou Montañez (BOW)	26
RBI	Lou Montañez (BOW)	97
R	Lou Montañez (BOW)	90
H	William Rhymes (ERI)	154
SB	Antoan Richardson (CT)	29

=== Pitching leaders ===
Stat	Player	Total
W	Bradley Bergesen (BOW)	15
L	Brandan Magee (NHP)	13
ERA	Michael Bowden (POR)	2.33
SO	David Hernandez (BOW)	156
IP	Lukas French (ERI)	165.0
SV	Julio Manon (BOW)	30

== Regular season ==
=== Opening Day ===
April 3 was the Opening Day of the 2008 Eastern League season. The following games are scheduled.

- Akron Aeros @ Harrisburg Senators – Senators won 8–5
- Erie SeaWolves @ Bowie Baysox – Postponed (rain)
- New Hampshire Fisher Cats @ Connecticut Defenders – Defenders won 3–2
- Portland Sea Dogs @ New Britain Rock Cats – Sea Dogs won 3–0
- Reading Phillies @ Altoona Curve – Phillies won 8–3
- Trenton Thunder @ Binghamton Mets – Mets won 2–0

=== All-star game ===
The 2008 Eastern League All-Star Game was the 6th midseason exhibition between the all-stars of the Northern Division and the Southern Division, the two divisions comprising the Eastern League. The game was played on July 16, 2008 at Merchantsauto.com Stadium in Manchester, New Hampshire, home of the New Hampshire Fisher Cats of the Northern Division. The North All-Stars defeated the South All-Stars, 5–3.

== Playoffs ==
=== Divisional Series ===
==== Northern Division ====
The Trenton Thunder defeated the Portland Sea Dogs in the Northern Division playoffs 3 games to 0.

==== Southern Division ====
The Akron Aeros defeated the Bowie Baysox in the Southern Division playoffs 3 games to 1. The Akron Aeros won their fourth consecutive Southern Division Championship in a row and four of the last five years

=== Championship series ===
For the second straight season, the Trenton Thunder defeated the Akron Aeros in the ELCS 3 games to 1.
