= Josh Judy =

American baseball player (born 1986)

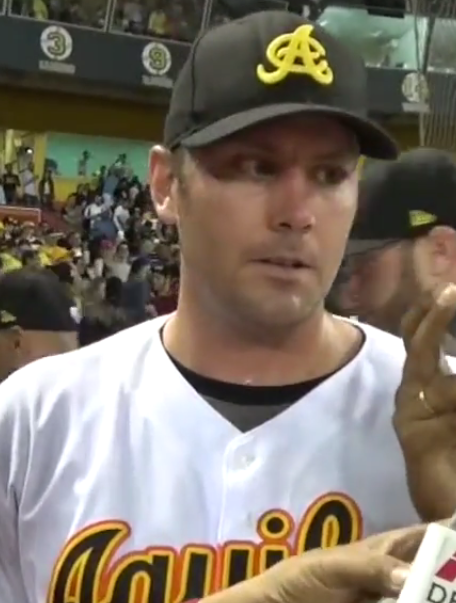
- Judy with Águilas Cibaeñas in 2017
- Pitcher
- Born: February 9, 1986 (age 40); Morgantown, West Virginia
- Batted: Right Threw: Right

MLB debut
- May 22, 2011, for the Cleveland Indians

Last MLB appearance
- September 26, 2011, for the Cleveland Indians

MLB statistics
- Win–loss record: 0–0
- Earned run average: 7.07
- Strikeouts: 10
- Stats at Baseball Reference

Teams
- Cleveland Indians (2011)

Josh Steven Judy (born February 9, 1986) is an American former professional baseball pitcher. He has played in Major League Baseball (MLB) for the Cleveland Indians.

== Amateur career ==
Judy played his high school baseball for University High School in Morgantown, West Virginia, leading them to the West Virginia State Baseball tournament for the first time in over 40 years. He also helped lead Morgantown Post 2 American Legion team to the Mid-Atlantic Regional in his final season with the club.

Judy was discovered as a collegiate prospect while participating in an off-season developmental program with MVP Baseball Academy in Morgantown. While working with pitching coach Joe Testa, Josh attended a workout for several college programs. He eventually signed to play his collegiate baseball at Indiana Tech, where he was coached by former Cincinnati Reds farmhand, Randy Stegall. After a 2007 NAIA All-American season, Josh was selected in the 34th round (1034 pick overall) of the 2007 Major League Baseball draft.

== Professional career ==
=== Cleveland Indians ===
After the 2010 season, Judy was added to the Indians' 40 man roster to protect him from the Rule 5 draft.

On May 21, 2011, Judy was called up to replace Alex White, who went on the 15-day disabled list with right middle finger soreness.

Judy made his Major League debut a day later in the Indians' 12–4 home victory over the Cincinnati Reds. He pitched a scoreless ninth inning, allowing two hits and striking out one batter. On May 25, 2011, Judy was sent back to Columbus.

Judy was recalled up to replace Chris Perez on July 1, 2011, when Perez was placed on the bereavement list. Judy made his second appearance against the Cincinnati Reds, where he gave up his first run, a home run to Édgar Rentería. In 12 games with the Indians, he was 0–4 with a 7.07 ERA.

=== Cincinnati Reds ===
Judy was designated for assignment on December 16, 2011, and was claimed off of waivers by the Cincinnati Reds on December 23, 2011. In 2012 with the Louisville Bats he was 2–2 with a 6.99 ERA in 40 games. He was released on November 5, 2012.

=== Los Angeles Angels of Anaheim ===
After beginning 2013 with the York Revolution of the Atlantic League of Professional Baseball, Judy signed a minor league contract with the Los Angeles Angels of Anaheim on May 5, 2013. He split the season between the AA Arkansas Travelers and the AAA Salt Lake Bees.

=== Los Angeles Dodgers ===
Judy signed a minor league contract with the Los Angeles Dodgers for 2014 and was assigned to the AAA Albuquerque Isotopes. In 23 games, he was 2–2 with a 5.79 ERA.

=== Tigres de Quintana Roo ===
Judy signed with the Tigres de Quintana Roo of the Mexican Baseball League for the 2016 season. He appeared in 50 games, finishing with a record of 3–4 with a 1.20 ERA.

=== Seattle Mariners ===
Judy signed a Triple-A contract with the Seattle Mariners in January 2017. He was released on March 30, 2017.

=== Sultanes de Monterrey ===
On April 18, 2017, Judy signed with the Sultanes de Monterrey of the Mexican Baseball League. He was released on May 6, 2017.

=== Olmecas de Tabasco ===
On May 16, 2017, Judy signed with the Olmecas de Tabasco of the Mexican Baseball League. He was released on July 6, 2017.

=== Aguilas Cibaeñas ===
Judy began playing with the Aguilas Cibaeñas in the Winter League of the Dominican Republic starting in 2016. In January 2018, Judy received the Pitcher of the Year award for the 2017-18 winter league season for Aguilas Cibaeñas.

=== Guerreros de Oaxaca ===
On February 28, 2018, Judy signed with the Guerreros de Oaxaca of the Mexican Baseball League. He became a free agent following the season.

=== York Revolution ===
On March 19, 2019, Judy signed with the York Revolution of the Atlantic League of Professional Baseball. In October, 2019, Judy was named a Downtown Fan Favorite by Revs fans for his fierce play on the field and his friendly, almost "Disney-like" interaction with fans off the field. He became a free agent following the season.

On March 9, 2020, Judy signed with the High Point Rockers of the Atlantic League. He did not play a game for the team because of the cancellation of the ALPB season due to the COVID-19 pandemic and became a free agent after the year. On February 22, 2021, Judy re-signed with the Rockers for the 2021 season. He was released prior to the season.
