= Mitch Talbot =

American baseball player (born 1983)

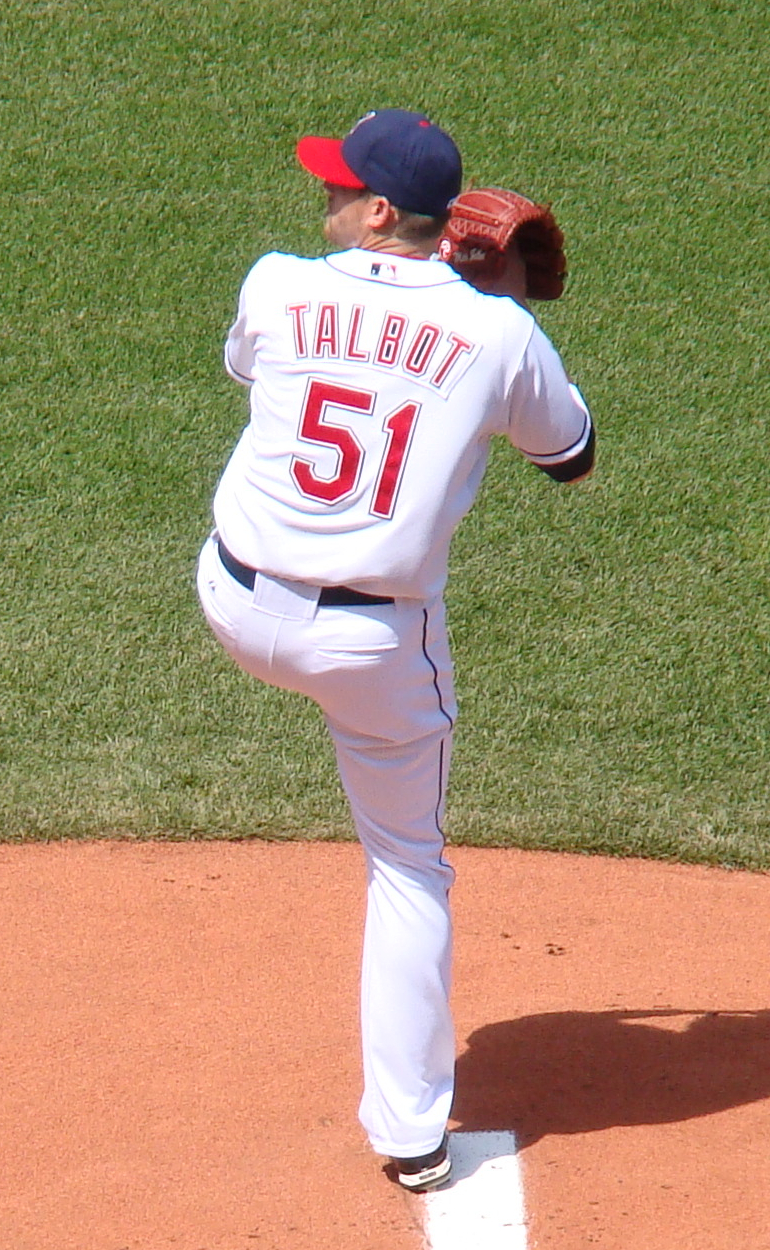
- Talbot with the Cleveland Indians in 2010
- Pitcher
- Born: October 17, 1983 (age 42); Cedar City, Utah, U.S.
- Batted: Right Threw: Right

Professional debut
- MLB: September 15, 2008, for the Tampa Bay Rays
- KBO: April 12, 2012, for the Samsung Lions
- CPBL: September 2, 2014, for the Lamigo Monkeys

Last appearance
- MLB: September 24, 2011, for the Cleveland Indians
- KBO: October 1, 2015, for the Hanwha Eagles
- CPBL: September 6, 2016, for the Lamigo Monkeys

MLB statistics
- Win–loss record: 12–19
- Earned run average: 5.30
- Strikeouts: 129

KBO statistics
- Win–loss record: 24–14
- Earned run average: 4.37
- Strikeouts: 188

CPBL statistics
- Win–loss record: 5–8
- Earned run average: 4.30
- Strikeouts: 88
- Stats at Baseball Reference

Teams
- Tampa Bay Rays (2008); Cleveland Indians (2010–2011); Samsung Lions (2012); Lamigo Monkeys (2014); Hanwha Eagles (2015); Lamigo Monkeys (2016)

Career highlights and awards
- Korean Series champion (2012); Taiwan Series champion (2014)

Mitchell R. Talbot (born October 17, 1983) is an American former professional baseball pitcher. He played in Major League Baseball (MLB) for the Tampa Bay Rays and Cleveland Indians, the KBO League for the Samsung Lions and Hanwha Eagles and in the Chinese Professional Baseball League (CPBL) for the Lamigo Monkeys.

== Amateur career ==
The youngest of six siblings, Talbot graduated from Canyon View High School in Cedar City, Utah and was a member of the Salt Lake Tribune's All-State second team during his senior season. Talbot committed to play college baseball for the Dixie State.

== Professional career ==
=== Houston Astros ===
Talbot was drafted by the Houston Astros in the second round (70th overall) in the 2002 Major League Baseball draft out of high school. He did not sign immediately and as a result did not begin his professional career until 2003.

In 2005, Talbot was rated to have the best changeup in the Astros' organization by Baseball America. He pitched for Single-A Salem and went 8-11 with a 4.34 ERA. Talbot was the Carolina League Pitcher of the Week for the week of July 25 to 31.

=== Tampa Bay Devil Rays ===
On July 12, 2006, during the All-Star break, Talbot and shortstop Ben Zobrist were traded to the Tampa Bay Devil Rays for outfielder Aubrey Huff. Pitching for two Double-A teams (Corpus Christi and Montgomery), Talbot went a combined 10–7 with a 2.76 ERA. Talbot earned the Devil Rays Minor League pitcher of August after he went 2–1 with a 1.96 ERA and led all of Double-A baseball with 47 strikeouts. He played for the Montgomery Biscuits during their 2006 league championship season and was named minorleaguebasell.com's best Double-A playoff performer.

In 2007, Talbot began the year for the Triple-A Durham Bulls. Talbot was called up to the majors on July 1, 2008. Talbot made his major league debut on September 15, in relief of Scott Kazmir, and pitched 3 innings, giving up 4 earned runs and striking out two batters while walking three Boston Red Sox. Talbot made his first major league start against the Baltimore Orioles on September 23, during the second game of a double header and did not earn a decision. He allowed three earned runs on six hits while walking three and striking out two over 4 1/3 innings.

Talbot returned to the minors in 2009, pitching mostly for Durham. He pitched in only 14 games, missing time due to an elbow injury.

=== Cleveland Indians ===
On December 21, 2009, Talbot was traded to the Cleveland Indians as a player to be named later in the Kelly Shoppach trade.

In 2010, Talbot was a regular in Cleveland's starting rotation, going 10–13 with a 4.41 ERA and 88 strikeouts in 28 starts.

Talbot was designated for assignment on July 31, 2011, to make room on the 40-man roster for Ubaldo Jiménez. He accepted his assignment and was sent to the Triple-A Columbus Clippers on August 5. Talbot returned to the Indians' roster again on September 24 and made his final MLB start that day. On October 18, he was removed from the 40-man roster and sent outright to Columbus, but he rejected the assignment and elected free agency. In 12 total starts for Cleveland in 2011, Talbot compiled a 2–6 record and 6.64 ERA with 36 strikeouts across 63 2/3 innings pitched.

=== Samsung Lions ===
On December 1, 2011, Talbot signed with the Samsung Lions of the KBO League. In 25 starts for Samsung, Talbot compiled a 14–3 record and 3.97 ERA with 68 strikeouts across 138 1/3 innings pitched. He became a free agent following the 2012 season.

=== Miami Marlins ===
On January 23, 2013, Talbot signed a minor league contract with the Miami Marlins. He made three rehab assignments split between the rookie-level Gulf Coast League Marlins and Triple-A New Orleans Zephyrs. Talbot was released by the Marlins organization on August 5.

=== New York Mets ===
On August 20, 2013, Talbot signed a minor league contract with the New York Mets organization and was assigned to the Triple-A Las Vegas 51s. He became a free agent on November 4.

=== Long Island Ducks ===
On June 30, 2014, Talbot signed with the Long Island Ducks of the Atlantic League of Professional Baseball. In nine appearances (seven starts) for Long Island, Talbot posted a 3-2 record and 4.14 ERA with 26 strikeouts over 37 innings of work.

=== Lamigo Monkeys ===
On August 25, 2014, Talbot signed with the Lamigo Monkeys of the Chinese Professional Baseball League. In six starts for the Monkeys, he posted a 3-3 record and 2.60 ERA with 30 strikeouts across 34 2/3 innings pitched. Talbot became a free agent following the season.

=== Hanwha Eagles ===
On December 5, 2014, Talbot signed with the Hanwha Eagles of the KBO League. Talbot made 30 starts for the Eagles during the 2015 season, compiling a 10-11 record and 4.72 ERA with 120 strikeouts across 156 1/3 innings pitched. He became a free agent following the season.

=== Lamigo Monkeys (second stint) ===
On April 8, 2016, Talbot signed with the Rieleros de Aguascalientes of the Mexican League. He never appeared in a game before returning to Taiwan.

On June 10, 2016, Talbot announced that he would return to the Lamigo Monkeys of the Chinese Professional Baseball League. In 14 starts for Lamigo, he logged a 2-5 record and 5.07 ERA with 58 strikeouts over 76 1/3 innings of work. Talbot became a free agent following the season.

=== Sugar Land Skeeters ===
On May 20, 2017, Talbot signed with the Sugar Land Skeeters of the Atlantic League of Professional Baseball. In 21 appearances (19 starts) for Sugar Land, he registered a 9-3 record and 3.03 ERA with 108 strikeouts over 110 innings of work.

Talbot made five starts for the Skeeters in 2018, compiling a 3-1 record and 1.93 ERA with 19 strikeouts across 28 innings pitched.

=== Cleveland Indians (second stint) ===
On May 23, 2018, Talbot's contract was purchased by the Cleveland Indians organization. In 18 games (17 starts) for the Triple-A Columbus Clippers, he logged a 4–5 record and 2.52 ERA with 64 strikeouts across 103 2/3 innings pitched. Talbot elected free agency following the season on November 2.

=== Sugar Land Skeeters (second stint) ===
On March 6, 2019, Talbot signed with the Sugar Land Skeeters of the Atlantic League of Professional Baseball. In seven starts for the Skeeters, Talbot compiled a 1-3 record and 3.93 ERA with 28 strikeouts across 34 1/3 innings pitched.

=== Cleveland Indians (third stint) ===
On June 5, 2019, the Cleveland Indians again purchased Talbot's contract from the Skeeters. He returned to the Triple-A Columbus Clippers, where he logged a 3–3 record and 5.37 ERA with 37 strikeouts across 12 games (11 starts). Talbot elected free agency following the season on November 4.
