= 2016 Chicago White Sox season =

2016 Chicago White Sox
- League: American League
- Division: Central
- Ballpark: U.S. Cellular Field
- City: Chicago, Illinois
- Record: 78–84 (.481)
- Divisional place: 4th
- Owners: Jerry Reinsdorf
- General managers: Rick Hahn
- Managers: Robin Ventura
- Television: CSN Chicago; CSN+ WGN-TV; WPWR-TV (Ken Harrelson, Steve Stone, Jason Benetti, Chuck Swirsky)
- Radio: WLS; Chicago White Sox Radio Network (Ed Farmer, Darrin Jackson); WRTO-AM (Spanish) (Hector Molina, Billy Russo)

The 2016 Chicago White Sox season was the club's 117th season in Chicago and 116th in the American League. The White Sox wore a black diamond patch on the uniform in honor of the late Eddie Einhorn, minority owner of the team. Despite a strong start by the team, they finished the season in fourth place in the American League Central.

The White Sox tied a major league record for most home runs by a losing team when they hit seven homers in a 10–8 defeat to Toronto on June 25.

== Regular season ==
=== Season standings ===
==== American League Central ====
AL Central
Team	W	L	Pct.	GB	Home	Road
Cleveland Indians	94	67	.584	—	53‍–‍28	41‍–‍39
Detroit Tigers	86	75	.534	8	45‍–‍35	41‍–‍40
Kansas City Royals	81	81	.500	13½	47‍–‍34	34‍–‍47
Chicago White Sox	78	84	.481	16½	45‍–‍36	33‍–‍48
Minnesota Twins	59	103	.364	35½	30‍–‍51	29‍–‍52

==== American League Wild Card ====
Division leaders
Team	W	L	Pct.
Texas Rangers	95	67	.586
Cleveland Indians	94	67	.584
Boston Red Sox	93	69	.574

Wild Card teams (Top 2 teams qualify for postseason)
Team	W	L	Pct.	GB
Toronto Blue Jays	89	73	.549	—
Baltimore Orioles	89	73	.549	—
Detroit Tigers	86	75	.534	2½
Seattle Mariners	86	76	.531	3
New York Yankees	84	78	.519	5
Houston Astros	84	78	.519	5
Kansas City Royals	81	81	.500	8
Chicago White Sox	78	84	.481	11
Los Angeles Angels	74	88	.457	15
Oakland Athletics	69	93	.426	20
Tampa Bay Rays	68	94	.420	21
Minnesota Twins	59	103	.364	30

==== Record against opponents ====
2016 American League record Source: MLB Standings Grid – 2016
Team	BAL	BOS	CWS	CLE	DET	HOU	KC	LAA	MIN	NYY	OAK	SEA	TB	TEX	TOR	NL
Baltimore	—	8–11	4–3	5–1	5–2	1–6	4–2	4–2	5–1	10–9	3–4	1–6	13–6	3–4	9–10	14–6
Boston	11–8	—	3–4	4–2	2–5	5–2	2–4	4–3	4–3	11–8	5–1	4–3	12–7	3–3	9–10	14–6
Chicago	3–4	4–3	—	8–11	7–12	3–3	5–14	2–5	12–7	3–3	5–2	4–3	4–3	4–2	5–1	9–11
Cleveland	1–5	2–4	11–8	—	14–4	3–4	14–5	6–1	10–9	2–5	4–2	3–4	5–1	2–5	4–3	13–7
Detroit	2–5	5–2	12–7	4–14	—	4–2	7–12	2–4	15–4	3–3	4–3	4–3	6–1	2–4	3–4	13–7
Houston	6–1	2–5	3–3	4–3	2–4	—	3–4	13–6	5–2	2–4	13–6	11–8	3–3	4–15	2–5	11–9
Kansas City	2–4	4–2	14–5	5–14	12–7	4–3	—	1–5	15–4	2–5	1–6	3–4	5–2	1–6	2–4	10–10
Los Angeles	2–4	3–4	5–2	1–6	4–2	6–13	5–1	—	2–4	1–6	12–7	8–11	3–4	9–10	4–3	9–11
Minnesota	1–5	3–4	7–12	9–10	4–15	2–5	4–15	4–2	—	2–5	2–4	4–2	3–4	5–2	1–6	8–12
New York	9–10	8–11	3–3	5–2	3–3	4–2	5–2	6–1	5–2	—	4–3	3–3	11–8	3–4	7–12	8–12
Oakland	4–3	1–5	2–5	2–4	3–4	6–13	6–1	7–12	4–2	3–4	—	7–12	5–2	9–10	3–3	7–13
Seattle	6–1	3–4	3–4	4–3	3–4	8–11	4–3	11–8	2–4	3–3	12–7	—	4–2	7–12	3–3	13–7
Tampa Bay	6–13	7–12	3–4	1–5	1–6	3–3	2–5	4–3	4–3	8–11	2–5	2–4	—	4–2	11–8	10–10
Texas	4–3	3–3	2–4	5–2	4–2	15–4	6–1	10–9	2–5	4–3	10–9	12–7	2–4	—	3–4	13–7
Toronto	10–9	10–9	1–5	3–4	4–3	5–2	4–2	3–4	6–1	12–7	3–3	3–3	8–11	4–3	—	13–7

== Game log ==
Legend
	White Sox win
	White Sox loss
	Postponement
**Bold**	White Sox team member

2016 White Sox Game Log: 78–84 (Home: 45–36; Away: 32–45)
April 17–8 (Home: 6–3; Road 11–5)

#	Date	Opponent	Time	Score	Win	Loss	Save	Record	Attendance	Streak/ Box
1	April 4	@ Athletics	9:05 pm	4–3	**Sale** (1–0)	Hill (0–1)	**Robertson** (1)	1–0	35,067	W1
2	April 5	@ Athletics	9:05 pm	5–4	**Jones** (1–0)	Doolittle (0–1)	**Robertson** (2)	2–0	10,478	W2
3	April 6	@ Athletics	9:05 pm	1–2	Gray (1–0)	**Rodon** (0–1)	Madson (1)	2–1	16.468	L1
4	April 7	@ Athletics	2:35 pm	6–1	**Latos** (1–0)	Graveman (0–1)	—	3–1	12,577	W1
5	April 8	Indians	3:10 pm	1–7	Salazar (1–0)	**Danks** (0–1)	—	3–2	38,019	L1
6	April 9	Indians	1:10 pm	7–3	**Sale** (2–0)	Shaw (0–1)	—	4–2	20,192	W1
—	April 10	Indians	1:10 pm	**Postponed (rain)** (Rescheduled for May 23)						
7	April 11	@ Twins	3:10 pm	4–1	**Quintana** (1–0)	Gibson (0–2)	**Robertson** (3)	5–2	40,638	W2
8	April 13	@ Twins	7:10 pm	3–0	**Rodon** (1–1)	Hughes (0–2)	**Robertson** (4)	6–2	21,008	W3
9	April 14	@ Twins	12:10 pm	3–1	**Latos** (2–0)	Santana (0–1)	**Robertson** (5)	7–2	19,736	W4
10	April 15	@ Rays	6:10 pm	1–0	**Sale** (3–0)	Colomé (1–1)	—	8–2	16,801	W5
11	April 16	@ Rays	5:10 pm	2–7	Ramírez (2–0)	**Danks** (0–2)	—	8–3	30,451	L1
12	April 17	@ Rays	12:10 pm	2–3	Moore (1–0)	**Quintana** (1–1)	Colomé (1)	8–4	21,810	L2
13	April 18	Angels	7:10 pm	0–7	Santiago (1–0)	**Rodon** (1–2)	—	8–5	14,706	L3
14	April 19	Angels	7:10 pm	5–0	**Latos** (3–0)	Shoemaker (1–2)	**Jones** (1)	9–5	12,093	W1
15	April 20	Angels	1:10 pm	2–1	**Sale** (4–0)	Richards (0–3)	**Robertson** (6)	10–5	12,785	W2
16	April 21	Angels	1:10 pm	2–3	Weaver (2–0)	**Danks** (0–3)	Street (4)	10–6	11,418	L1
17	April 22	Rangers	7:10 pm	5–0	**Quintana** (2–1)	Pérez (0–2)	—	11–6	15,486	W1
18	April 23	Rangers	1:10 pm	4–3 (11)	**Albers** (1–0)	Martinez (0–1)	—	12–6	20,182	W2
19	April 24	Rangers	1:10 pm	4–1	**Latos** (4–0)	Holland (2–1)	**Robertson** (7)	13–6	26,058	W3
20	April 25	@ Blue Jays	6:07 pm	7–5	**Putnam** (1–0)	Cecil (0–4)	**Robertson** (8)	14–6	24,333	W4
21	April 26	@ Blue Jays	6:07 pm	10–1	**Sale** (5–0)	Dickey (1–3)	—	15–6	23,726	W5
22	April 27	@ Blue Jays	6:07 pm	4–0	**Quintana** (3–1)	Estrada (1–2)	—	16–6	28,759	W6
23	April 28	@ Orioles	6:05 pm	2–10	Givens (2–0)	**Danks** (0–4)	—	16–7	14,568	L1
24	April 29	@ Orioles	6:05 pm	3–6	Brach (3–0)	**Rodon** (1–3)	Britton (6)	16–8	19,912	L2
25	April 30	@ Orioles	6:05 pm	8–7	**Jones** (2–0)	Britton (1–1)	—	17–8	29,152	W1

May 11–17 (Home: 7–9; Road: 4–8)

#	Date	Opponent	Time	Score	Win	Loss	Save	Record	Attendance	Streak/ Box
26	May 1	@ Orioles	12:35 pm	7–1	**Sale** (6–0)	Jiménez (1–3)	—	18–8	28,803	W2
27	May 3	Red Sox	7:10 pm	4–1	**Quintana** (4–1)	Wright (2–3)	**Robertson** (9)	19–8	15,025	W3
28	May 4	Red Sox	7:10 pm	2–5	Buchholz (1–3)	**Rodon** (1–4)	Kimbrel (9)	19–9	14,383	L1
29	May 5	Red Sox	7:10 pm	3–7	Barnes (2–1)	**Johnson** (0–1)	—	19–10	20,126	L2
30	May 6	Twins	7:10 pm	10–4	**Latos** (5–0)	Nolasco (1–1)	—	20–10	23,054	W1
31	May 7	Twins	6:10 pm	7–2	**Sale** (7–0)	Santana (0–2)	—	21–10	28,049	W2
32	May 8	Twins	1:10 pm	3–1	**Quintana** (5–1)	Duffey (0–2)	**Robertson** (10)	22–10	23,801	W3
33	May 9	@ Rangers	7:05 pm	8–4 (12)	**Jennings** (1–0)	Ramos (0–2)	—	23–10	22,958	W4
34	May 10	@ Rangers	7:05 pm	11–13	Claudio (1–0)	**Albers** (1–1)	Tolleson (11)	23–11	25,804	L1
35	May 11	@ Rangers	1:05 pm	5–6	Barnette (2–2)	**Jennings** (1–1)	Dyson (1)	23–12	29,023	L2
36	May 13	@ Yankees	6:05 pm	7–1	**Sale** (8–0)	Severino (0–6)	—	24–12	34,264	W1
37	May 14	@ Yankees	12:05 pm	1–2	Nova (2–1)	**Quintana** (5–2)	Chapman (2)	24–13	39,691	L1
38	May 15	@ Yankees	12:05 pm	5–7	Betances (1–2)	**Albers** (1–2)	Chapman (3)	24–14	41,979	L2
39	May 17	Astros	7:10 pm	5–6 (11)	Neshek (1–0)	**Albers** (1–3)	Sipp (1)	24–15	13,481	L3
40	May 18	Astros	7:10 pm	3–5	Fister (4–3)	**Latos** (5–1)	Gregerson (9)	24–16	14,936	L4
41	May 19	Astros	7:10 pm	2–1	**Sale** (9–0)	McHugh (4–4)	—	25–16	20,096	W1
42	May 20	Royals	7:10 pm	1–4	Gee (1–1)	**Quintana** (5–3)	Davis (10)	25–17	24,020	L1
43	May 21	Royals	1:10 pm	1–2	Soria (2–1)	**González** (0–1)	Davis (11)	25–18	27,631	L2
44	May 22	Royals	1:10 pm	3–2	**Rodon** (2–4)	Ventura (4–3)	**Robertson** (11)	26–18	34,526	W1
45	May 23	Indians	4:10 pm	7–6	**Latos** (6–1)	Clevinger (0–1)	**Robertson** (12)	27–18	—	W2
46	May 23	Indians	7:10 pm	1–5	Anderson (1–3)	**Johnson** (0–2)	—	27–19	18,323	L1
47	May 24	Indians	7:10 pm	2–6	Tomlin (7–0)	**Sale** (9–1)	—	27–20	21,550	L2
48	May 25	Indians	1:10 pm	3–4	Kluber (4–5)	**Quintana** (5–4)	Allen (11)	27–21	22,561	L3
—	May 26	@ Royals	7:15 pm	**Postponed (rain)** (Rescheduled for Sept 19, 2016)						
49	May 27	@ Royals	7:15 pm	5–7	Moylan (2–0)	**Albers** (1–4)	Davis (13)	27–22	28,508	L4
50	May 28	@ Royals	1:15 pm	7–8	Chien-Ming Wang (3–0)	**Kahnle** (0–1)	—	27–23		L5
51	May 29	@ Royals	1:15 pm	4–5	Young (2–5)	**Jones** (2–1)	Davis (14)	27–24	36,624	L6
52	May 30	@ Mets	12:10 pm	0–1	Harvey (4–7)	**Quintana** (5–5)	Familia (17)	27–25	38,339	L7
53	May 31	@ Mets	6:10 pm	6–4	**Jennings** (2–1)	Robles (0–3)	**Robertson** (13)	28–25	32,781	W1

June 12–14 (Home: 8–7; Road: 4–7)

#	Date	Opponent	Time	Score	Win	Loss	Save	Record	Attendance	Streak/ Box
54	June 1	@ Mets	12:10 pm	2–1 (13)	**Albers** (2–4)	Verrett (3–3)	—	29–25	34,160	W2
55	June 3	@ Tigers	6:10 pm	3–10	Zimmermann (8–2)	**Rodon** (2–5)	—	29–26	31,184	L1
56	June 4	@ Tigers	3:10 pm	4–7	Pelfrey (1–5)	**Sale** (9–2)	Rodríguez (16)	29–27	32,916	L2
57	June 5	@ Tigers	12:10 pm	2–5	Verlander (5–5)	**Quintana** (5–6)	Rodríguez (17)	29–28	29,086	L3
58	June 7	Nationals	7:10 pm	5–10	Treinen (4–1)	**Latos** (6–2)	—	29–29	18,812	L4
59	June 8	Nationals	7:10 pm	4–11	Scherzer (7–4)	**Shields** (2–8)	—	29–30	15,273	L5
60	June 9	Nationals	7:10 pm	3–1	**González** (1–1)	González (3–5)	**Robertson** (14)	30–30	20,014	W1
61	June 10	Royals	7:10 pm	7–5	**Sale** (10–2)	Kennedy (4–5)	**Robertson** (15)	31–30	23,900	W2
62	June 11	Royals	1:10 pm	1–4	Duffy (2–1)	**Quintana** (5–7)	—	31–31	31,183	L1
63	June 12	Royals	1:10 pm	1–3	Ventura (5–4)	**Rodon** (2–6)	Davis (17)	31–32	30,363	L2
64	June 13	Tigers	7:10 pm	10–9 (12)	**Duke** (1–0)	Sánchez (3–7)	—	32–32	16,314	W1
65	June 14	Tigers	7:10 pm	8–11	Zimmermann (9–3)	**González** (1–2)	—	32–33	17,403	L1
66	June 15	Tigers	7:10 pm	5–3	**Sale** (11–2)	Pelfrey (1–7)	**Robertson** (16)	33–33	20,292	W1
67	June 17	@ Indians	6:10 pm	2–3	Allen (2–3)	**Jones** (2–2)	—	33–34	27,912	L1
68	June 18	@ Indians	5:10 pm	2–13	Salazar (8–3)	**Shields** (2–9)	—	33–35	31,066	L2
69	June 19	@ Indians	12:10 pm	2–3	Otero (2–0)	**Robertson** (0–1)	—	33–36	25,269	L3
70	June 20	@ Red Sox	6:10 pm	3–1	**Duke** (2–0)	Kimbrel (0–3)	**Robertson** (17)	34–36	36,291	W1
71	June 21	@ Red Sox	6:10 pm	3–1	**Sale** (12–2)	Buchholz (3–7)	**Robertson** (18)	35–36	36,554	W2
72	June 22	@ Red Sox	6:10 pm	8–6	**Jennings** (3–1)	Uehara (2–2)	**Duke** (1)	36–36	37,413	W3
73	June 23	@ Red Sox	12:35 pm	7–8 (10)	Kimbrel (1–3)	**Purke** (0–1)	—	36–37	37,790	L1
74	June 24	Blue Jays	7:10 pm	3–2	**Jones** (3–2)	Chavez (0–2)	**Robertson** (19)	37–37	27,196	W1
75	June 25	Blue Jays	1:10 pm	8–10	Dickey (5–8)	**González** (1–3)	Osuna (15)	37–38	25,776	L1
76	June 26	Blue Jays	1:10 pm	5–2	**Sale** (13–2)	Stroman (6–4)	**Robertson** (20)	38–38	28,345	W1
77	June 28	Twins	7:10 pm	0–4	Gibson (1–5)	**Quintana (5–8)**	—	38–39	22,072	L1
78	June 29	Twins	7:10 pm	6–9	**Shields** (3–9)	Nolasco (3–6)	**Jones** (2)	39–39	18,571	W1
79	June 30	Twins	1:10 pm	5–6	**Jones** (4–2)	Abad (1–2)	**Robertson** (21)	40–39	26,158	W2

July 11–15 (Home: 7–5; Road: 4–10)

#	Date	Opponent	Time	Score	Win	Loss	Save	Record	Attendance	Streak/ Box
80	July 1	@ Astros	7:10 pm	0–5	Mike Fiers (6–3)	**Miguel González** (1–4)	—	40–40	31,965	L1
81	July 2	@ Astros	3:10 pm	7–6	**Sale** (14–2)	Fister (8–5)	—	41–40	35,116	W1
82	July 3	@ Astros	1:10 pm	4–1	**Quintana** (6–8)	McHugh (5–6)	**Robertson** (23)	42–40	30,379	W2
83	July 4	Yankees	1:10 pm	8–2	**Shields** (4–9)	Sabathia (5–6)	—	43–40	30,955	W3
84	July 5	Yankees	7:10 pm	0–9	Tanaka (6–2)	**Rodon** (2–7)	—	43–41	20,773	L1
85	July 6	Yankees	7:10 pm	5–0	**González** (2–4)	Pineda (3–8)	—	44–41	21,144	W1
86	July 8	Braves	7:10 pm	8-11	Wisler (4–8)	**Sale** (14–3)	—	44–42	26,199	L1
87	July 9	Braves	1:10 pm	5–4	**Quintana** (7–8)	Teherán (3–8)	**Jones** (3)	45–42	23,888	W1
88	July 10	Braves	1:10 pm	0–2	Foltynewicz (3–3)	**Shields** (4–10)	Johnson (2)	45–43	29,156	L1
**87th All-Star Game in San Diego, California**
89	July 15	@ Angels	9:05 pm	0–7	Santiago (7–4)	**González** (2–5)	—	45–44	42,031	L2
90	July 16	@ Angels	8:05 pm	0–1	Shoemaker (5–9)	**Shields** (4–11)	—	45–45	39,620	L3
91	July 17	@ Angels	2:35 pm	1–8	Weaver (8–7)	**Turner** (0–1)	—	45–46	36,834	L4
92	July 18	@ Mariners	9:10 pm	3–4	Rollins (1–0)	**Robertson** (0–2)	—	45–47	20,598	L5
93	July 19	@ Mariners	9:10 pm	6–1	**Quintana** (8–8)	Miley (6–7)	—	46–47	24,851	W1
94	July 20	@ Mariners	2:40 pm	5–6 (11)	Nuño (1–1)	**Jennings** (3–2)	—	46–48	39,985	L1
95	July 21	Tigers	7:10 pm	1–2 (7)	Pelfrey (3–9)	**Shields** (4–12)	—	46–49	24,938	L2
96	July 22	Tigers	7:10 pm	5–7	Ryan (4–2)	**Fulmer** (0–1)	Rodríguez (27)	46–50	22,611	L3
97	July 23	Tigers	6:10 pm	4–3	**Robertson** (1–2)	Wilson (2–3)	—	47–50	32,527	W1
98	July 24	Tigers	1:10 pm	5–4	**Robertson** (2–2)	Rondón (3–2)	—	48–50	30,281	W2
99	July 25	Cubs	7:10 pm	5–4	**Jennings** (4–2)	Montgomery (3–5)	—	49–50	39,510	W3
100	July 26	Cubs	7:10 pm	3–0	**Shields** (5–12)	Hendricks (9–7)	**Robertson** (24)	50–50	39,553	W4
101	July 27	@ Cubs	7:05 pm	1–8	Hammel (10–5)	**Ranaudo** (1–1)	—	50–51	41,166	L1
102	July 28	@ Cubs	7:05 pm	1–3	Lackey (8–7)	**Sale** (14–4)	Chapman (21)	50–52	41,157	L2
103	July 29	@ Twins	7:10 pm	1–2	May (2–2)	**Jennings** (3–4)	—	50–53	23,983	L3
104	July 30	@ Twins	6:10 pm	6–5 (10)	**Ynoa** (1–0)	Abad (1–4)	**Robertson** (25)	51–53	27,914	W1
105	July 31	@ Twins	1:10 pm	4–6	Santana (4–9)	**Rodon** (2–8)	Pressly (1)	51–54	29,670	L1

August 12–15 (Home: 7–5; Road: 5–10)

#	Date	Opponent	Time	Score	Win	Loss	Save	Record	Attendance	Streak/ Box
106	August 2	@ Tigers	6:10 pm	5–11	Sánchez (6–11)	**Shields** (5–13)	—	51–55	30,316	L2
107	August 3	@ Tigers	6:10 pm	1–2	Greene (2–2)	**Sale** (14–5)	Rodríguez (30)	51–56	32,546	L3
108	August 4	@ Tigers	12:10 pm	6–3	**Quintana** (9–8)	Zimmerman (9–5)	**Robertson** (26)	52–56	33,023	W1
109	August 5	Orioles	7:10 pm	5–7	Gallardo (4–3)	**González** (2–6)	Britton (34)	52–57	26,553	L1
110	August 6	Orioles	6:10 pm	4–2	**Jones** (5–2)	Tillman (14–4)	**Robertson** (27)	53–57	28,941	W1
111	August 7	Orioles	1:10 pm	2–10	Bundy (5–3)	**Shields** (5–14)	Jiménez (1)	53–58	31,040	L1
112	August 9	@ Royals	7:15 pm	7–5 (10)	**Robertson** (3–2)	Herrera (1–4)	**Jennings** (1)	54–58	27,134	W1
113	August 10	@ Royals	7:15 pm	2–3 (14)	Gee (4–5)	**Albers** (2–5)	—	54–59	25,188	L1
114	August 11	@ Royals	7:15 pm	1–2	Duffy (9–1)	**Fulmer** (0–2)	—	54–60	34,310	L2
115	August 12	@ Marlins	6:10 pm	4–2	**Rodon** (3–8)	Cashner (4–9)	**Robertson** (28)	55-60	21,090	W1
116	August 13	@ Marlins	6:10 pm	9–8	**Beck** (1–0)	Barraclough (6–3)	**Robertson** (29)	56–60	20,006	W2
117	August 14	@ Marlins	12:10 pm	4–5	Dunn (3–1)	**Sale** (14–6)	Rodney (20)	56–61	21,401	L1
118	August 16	@ Indians	6:10 pm	1–3	Kluber (13–8)	**Quintana** (9–9)	Allen (23)	56–62	13,857	L2
119	August 17	@ Indians	6:10 pm	10–7	**Turner** (1–1)	Allen (2–5)	**Robertson** (30)	57–62	14,371	W1
120	August 18	@ Indians	6:10 pm	4–5	Miller (7–1)	**Turner** (1–2)	—	57–63	12,982	L1
121	August 19	Athletics	7:10 pm	0–9	Graveman (9–8)	**Shields** (5–15)	—	57–64	20,001	L2
122	August 20	Athletics	6:10 pm	6–2	**Sale** (15–6)	Detwiler (1–2)	**Robertson** (31)	58–64	21,178	W1
123	August 21	Athletics	1:10 pm	4–2	**Quintana** (10–9)	Neal (2–3)	**Robertson** (32)	59–64	23,030	W2
124	August 23	Phillies	7:10 pm	9–1	**Rodon** (4–8)	Thompson (1–3)	—	60–64	18,843	W3
125	August 24	Phillies	7:10 pm	3–5	Eickhoff (9–12)	**Shields** (5–16)	Gómez (34)	60–65	15,630	L1
126	August 25	Mariners	7:10 pm	7–6	**Robertson** (4–2)	Vincent (3–4)	—	61–65	19,072	W1
127	August 26	Mariners	7:10 pm	1–3	Hernández (9–4)	**Sale** (15–7)	Díaz (11)	61–66	25,651	L1
128	August 27	Mariners	6:10 pm	9–3	**Quintana** (11–9)	Miranda (1–1)	—	62–66	27,318	W1
129	August 28	Mariners	1:10 pm	4–1	**Rodon** (5–8)	Walker (4–9)	**Robertson** (33)	63–66	25,538	W2
130	August 29	@ Tigers	6:10 pm	3–4	Wilson (4–4)	**Jones** (5–3)	Rodríguez (37)	63–67	27,201	L1
131	August 30	@ Tigers	6:10 pm	4–8	Rondón (5–2)	**Albers** (2–6)	—	63–68	27,121	L2
132	August 31	@ Tigers	12:10 pm	2–3	Rodríguez (2–3)	**Robertson** (4–3)	—	63–69	32,465	L3

September 15–13 (Home: 10–5; Road: 5–8)

#	Date	Opponent	Time	Score	Win	Loss	Save	Record	Attendance	Streak/ Box
133	September 1	@ Twins	7:10 pm	5-8	Santana (7–10)	**Quintana** (11–10)	Kintzler (13)	63–70	20,329	L4
134	September 2	@ Twins	7:10 pm	11–4	**Rodon** (6–8)	Gibson (5–9)	—	64–70	20,806	W1
135	September 3	@ Twins	6:10 pm	3–11	Santiago (11–8)	**Shields** (5–17)	—	64–71	22,274	L1
136	September 4	@ Twins	1:10 pm	13–11 (12)	**Minaya** (1–0)	Dean (1–6)	**Kahnle** (1)	65–71	22,595	W1
137	September 5	Tigers	3:10 pm	3–5 (11)	Wilson (2–0)	**Beck** (1–1)	Rodríguez (39)	65–72	18,653	L1
138	September 6	Tigers	7:10 pm	2–0	**González** (3–6)	Boyd (5–3)	**Robertson** (34)	66–72	15,155	W1
139	September 7	Tigers	1:10 pm	7–4	**Beck** (2–1)	Greene (3–4)	**Robertson** (35)	67–72	13,078	W2
140	September 9	Royals	7:10 pm	7–2	**Rodon** (7–8)	Ventura (10–10)	—	68–72	20,653	W3
141	September 10	Royals	6:10 pm	5–6	McCarthy (1–0)	**Beck** (2–2)	Davis (23)	68–73	20,148	L1
142	September 11	Royals	1:10 pm	0–2	Kennedy (11–9)	**Sale** (15–8)	Davis (23)	68–74	20,107	L2
143	September 12	Indians	7:10 pm	11–4	**González** (4–6)	Carrasco (11–8)	—	69–74	12,588	W1
144	September 13	Indians	7:10 pm	8–1	**Quintana** (12–10)	Bauer (11–7)	—	70–74	15,588	W2
145	September 14	Indians	7:10 pm	1–6	Tomlin (12–8)	**Rodon** (7–9)	—	70–75	15,808	L1
146	September 15	Indians	1:10 pm	2–1	**Robertson** (5–3)	Shaw (2–5)	—	71–75		W1
147	September 16	@ Royals	7:15 pm	7–4	**Sale** (16–8)	Herrera (2–5)	—	72–75	34,805	W2
148	September 17	@ Royals	6:15 pm	2–3	Gee (7–8)	**González** (4–7)	Davis (25)	72–76	34,982	L1
149	September 18	@ Royals	1:15 pm	3–10	Duffy (12–2)	**Quintana** (12–11)	—	72–77	31,502	L2
150	September 19	@ Royals	1:15 pm	3–8	Ventura (11–11)	**Rodon** (7–10)	—	72–78	31,502	L3
151	September 20	@ Phillies	6:05 pm	6-7	Thompson (3–5)	**Shields** (5–18)	Mariot (1)	72–79	16,069	L4
152	September 21	@ Phillies	6:05 pm	3–8	Eickhoff (11–14)	**Sale** (16–9)	—	72–80	21,703	L5
153	September 23	@ Indians	6:10 pm	4–10	Bauer (12–8)	**González** (4–8)	—	72–81	18,937	L6
154	September 24	@ Indians	6:10 pm	8–1	**Quintana** (13–11)	Anderson (2–5)	—	73–81	32,088	W1
155	September 25	@ Indians	12:10 pm	3–0	**Rodon** (8–10)	Tomlin (12–9)	**Robertson** (36)	74–81	24,118	W2
156	September 26	Rays	7:10 pm	7–1	**Shields** (6–18)	Smyly (7–12)	—	75–81	13,665	W3
157	September 27	Rays	7:10 pm	13–6	**Sale** (17–9)	Cobb (1–2)	—	76–81	14,798	W4
158	September 28	Rays	7:10 pm	1–0	**González** (5–8)	Gamboa (0–2)	**Robertson** (37)	77–81	12,976	W5
159	September 29	Rays	7:10 pm	3–5	Archer (9–19)	**Quintana** (13–12)	Colomé (36)	77–82	14,792	L1
160	September 30	Twins	7:10 pm	7–3	**Rodon** (9–10)	Duffey (9–12)	—	78–82	19,007	W1

October 0–2 (Home: 0–0; Road: 0–2)

#	Date	Opponent	Time	Score	Win	Loss	Save	Record	Attendance	Streak/ Box
161	October 1	Twins	6:10 pm	0–6	Santiago (13–10)	**Shields** (6–19)	—	78–83	25,730	L1
162	October 2	Twins	2:10 pm	3–6	Berríos (3–7)	**Sale** (17–10)	Kintzler (17)	78–84	21,904	L2

== Personnel ==
=== Opening Day lineup ===
Opening Day Starters
Name	Pos.
Adam Eaton	RF
Jimmy Rollins	SS
José Abreu	1B
Todd Frazier	3B
Melky Cabrera	LF
Avisaíl García	DH
Brett Lawrie	2B
Dioner Navarro	C
Austin Jackson	CF
Chris Sale	SP

== Roster ==
2016 Chicago White Sox
Roster
Pitchers: 34 Matt Albers; 54 Chris Beck; 67 Scott Carroll; 60 Tyler Danish; 50 John Danks; 33 Zach Duke; 51 Carson Fulmer; 58 Miguel González; 43 Dan Jennings; 45 Erik Johnson; 65 Nate Jones; 48 Tommy Kahnle; 38 Mat Latos; 67 Juan Minaya; 52 Jake Petricka; 64 Matt Purke; 57 Zach Putnam; 62 José Quintana; 45 Anthony Ranaudo; 30 David Robertson; 55 Carlos Rodon; 49 Chris Sale; 25 James Shields; 68 Blake Smith; 29 Jacob Turner; 40 Daniel Webb; 66 Michael Ynoa	Catchers: 31 Alex Avila; 38 Omar Narváez; 27 Dioner Navarro; 29 Héctor Sánchez; 61 Kevan Smith; Infielders: 79 José Abreu; 12 Tim Anderson; 21 Todd Frazier; 15 Brett Lawrie; 7 Jimmy Rollins; 18 Tyler Saladino; 5 Carlos Sánchez	Outfielders: 53 Melky Cabrera; 36 Jason Coats; 1 Adam Eaton; 26 Avisaíl García; 28 Leury García; 10 Austin Jackson; 41 Jerry Sands; 20 J. B. Shuck; 24 Charlie Tilson; Other batters: 22 Matt Davidson; 44 Justin Morneau	Manager: 23 Robin Ventura; Coaches: 8 Daryl Boston (first base); 99 Don Cooper (pitching); 47 Joe McEwing (third base); 17 Rick Renteria (bench); 59 Mark Salas (bullpen catcher); 46 Greg Sparks (assistant hitting); 39 Todd Steverson (hitting); 37 Bobby Thigpen (bullpen)

== Statistics ==
=== Batting ===
(final statistics)

Note: G = Games played; AB = At bats; R = Runs; H = Hits; 2B = Doubles; 3B = Triples; HR = Home runs; RBI = Runs batted in; Avg. = Batting average; OBP = On-base percentage; SLG = Slugging percentage; SB = Stolen bases

Player	G	AB	R	H	2B	3B	HR	RBI	AVG	OBP	SLG	SB
José Abreu	159	624	67	183	32	1	25	100	.293	.353	.468	0
Matt Albers	58	1	1	1	1	0	0	0	1.000	1.000	2.000	0
Tim Anderson	99	410	57	116	22	6	9	30	.283	.306	.432	10
Alex Avila	57	169	19	36	6	0	7	11	.213	.359	.373	0
Melky Cabrera	151	591	70	175	42	5	14	86	.296	.345	.455	2
Jason Coats	28	50	8	10	4	0	1	4	.200	.298	.340	1
Matt Davidson	1	2	1	1	0	0	0	1	.500	.500	.500	0
Adam Eaton	157	619	91	176	29	9	14	59	.284	.362	.428	14
Todd Frazier	158	590	89	133	21	0	40	98	.225	.302	.464	15
Avisaíl García	120	413	59	101	18	2	12	51	.245	.307	.385	4
Leury García	18	48	6	11	1	1	1	5	.229	.260	.354	2
Miguel González	24	1	0	0	0	0	0	0	.000	.000	.000	0
Austin Jackson	54	181	24	46	12	2	0	18	.254	.318	.343	2
Mat Latos	11	2	0	0	0	0	0	0	.000	.000	.000	0
Brett Lawrie	94	351	35	87	22	0	12	36	.248	.310	.413	7
Justin Morneau	58	203	16	53	14	1	6	25	.261	.303	.429	0
Omar Narváez	34	101	13	27	4	0	1	10	.267	.350	.337	0
Dioner Navarro	85	271	25	57	13	2	6	32	.210	.267	.339	1
José Quintana	32	2	0	0	0	0	0	0	.000	.000	.000	0
Anthony Ranaudo	7	3	1	1	0	0	1	1	.333	.333	1.333	0
Carlos Rodon	28	3	0	0	0	0	0	0	.000	.000	.000	0
Jimmy Rollins	41	149	25	33	8	1	2	8	.221	.295	.329	5
Tyler Saladino	93	298	33	84	14	0	8	38	.282	.315	.409	11
Chris Sale	32	6	0	1	0	0	0	0	.167	.167	.167	0
Carlos Sánchez	53	154	15	32	9	1	4	21	.208	.236	.357	0
Héctor Sánchez	2	7	0	1	0	0	0	1	.143	.250	.143	0
Jerry Sands	24	55	2	13	0	0	1	7	.236	.276	.291	0
James Shields	22	4	0	1	0	0	0	0	.250	.250	.250	0
J. B. Shuck	81	224	27	46	5	2	4	14	.205	.248	.299	0
Kevan Smith	7	16	2	2	0	0	0	0	.125	.125	.125	0
Charlie Tilson	1	2	0	0	0	0	0	0	.000	.000	.000	0
Team totals	162	5550	686	1428	277	33	168	656	.257	.317	.410	77

=== Pitching ===
(final statistics)

Note: W = Wins; L = Losses; ERA = Earned run average; G = Games pitched; GS = Games started; SV = Saves; IP = Innings pitched; H = Hits allowed; R = Runs allowed; ER = Earned runs allowed; BB = Walks allowed; K = Strikeouts

Player	W	L	ERA	G	GS	SV	IP	H	R	ER	BB	K
Matt Albers	2	6	6.31	58	1	0	51.1	67	44	36	19	30
Chris Beck	2	2	6.39	25	0	0	25.1	31	18	18	17	20
Scott Carroll	0	0	11.57	3	0	0	2.1	2	3	3	1	2
Tyler Danish	0	0	10.80	3	0	0	1.2	6	2	2	3	0
John Danks	0	4	7.25	4	4	0	22.1	28	20	18	11	16
Zach Duke	2	0	2.63	53	0	1	27.2	31	11	11	16	42
Carson Fulmer	0	2	8.49	8	0	0	11.2	12	11	11	7	10
Miguel González	5	8	3.73	24	23	0	135.0	132	61	56	35	95
Dan Jennings	4	3	2.08	64	0	1	60.2	57	18	14	28	46
Erik Johnson	0	2	6.94	2	2	0	11.2	14	9	9	6	11
Nate Jones	5	3	2.29	71	0	3	70.2	48	20	18	15	80
Tommy Kahnle	0	1	2.63	29	0	1	27.1	21	8	8	20	25
Mat Latos	6	2	4.62	11	11	0	60.1	63	33	31	25	32
Juan Minaya	1	0	4.35	11	0	0	10.1	10	6	5	5	6
Jake Petricka	0	0	4.50	9	0	0	8.0	8	5	4	8	7
Matt Purke	0	1	5.50	12	0	0	18.0	20	12	11	12	15
Zach Putnam	1	0	2.30	25	0	0	27.1	25	7	7	11	30
José Quintana	13	12	3.20	32	32	0	208.0	192	76	74	50	181
Anthony Ranaudo	0	1	8.46	7	5	0	27.2	34	26	26	12	16
David Robertson	5	3	3.47	62	0	48	62.1	53	24	24	32	75
Carlos Rodon	9	10	4.04	28	28	0	165.0	176	82	74	54	168
Chris Sale	17	10	3.34	32	32	0	226.2	190	88	84	45	233
James Shields	4	12	6.77	22	22	0	114.1	139	89	86	55	78
J. B. Shuck	0	0	9.00	1	1	0	1.0	1	1	1	0	0
Blake Smith	0	0	6.23	5	0	0	4.1	7	3	3	0	1
Jacob Turner	1	2	7.58	18	2	0	24.2	33	27	18	16	18
Daniel Webb	0	0	0.00	1	0	0	1.0	2	0	0	1	3
Michael Ynoa	1	0	3.00	23	0	0	30.0	20	11	10	17	30
Team totals	78	84	4.10	162	162	43	1446.2	1422	715	659	521	1270

== Farm system ==
Level	Team	League	Manager
AAA	Charlotte Knights	International League	Julio Vinas
AA	Birmingham Barons	Southern League	Ryan Newman
A-Advanced	Winston-Salem Dash	Carolina League	Joel Skinner
A	Kannapolis Intimidators	South Atlantic League	Cole Armstrong
Rookie	Great Falls Voyagers	Pioneer League	Tommy Thompson
Rookie	AZL White Sox	Arizona League	Mike Gellinger
Rookie	DSL White Sox	Dominican Summer League	
