= 2016 Oakland Athletics season =

2016 Oakland Athletics
- League: American League
- Division: West
- Ballpark: Oakland Coliseum
- City: Oakland, California
- Record: 69–93 (.426)
- Divisional place: 5th
- Owners: Lewis Wolff, John Fisher
- General managers: Billy Beane
- Managers: Bob Melvin
- Television: Comcast SportsNet California (Glen Kuiper, Ray Fosse, Mark Mulder, Eric Chavez)
- Radio: KGMZ (Ken Korach, Vince Cotroneo, Ray Fosse)

The 2016 Oakland Athletics season was the 49th for the franchise in Oakland, as well as the 116th in club history. They finished the season in last place in the American League West.

== Regular season ==
=== American League West ===
AL West
Team	W	L	Pct.	GB	Home	Road
Texas Rangers	95	67	.586	—	53‍–‍28	42‍–‍39
Seattle Mariners	86	76	.531	9	44‍–‍37	42‍–‍39
Houston Astros	84	78	.519	11	43‍–‍38	41‍–‍40
Los Angeles Angels	74	88	.457	21	40‍–‍41	34‍–‍47
Oakland Athletics	69	93	.426	26	34‍–‍47	35‍–‍46

=== American League Wild Card ===
Division leaders
Team	W	L	Pct.
Texas Rangers	95	67	.586
Cleveland Indians	94	67	.584
Boston Red Sox	93	69	.574

Wild Card teams (Top 2 teams qualify for postseason)
Team	W	L	Pct.	GB
Toronto Blue Jays	89	73	.549	—
Baltimore Orioles	89	73	.549	—
Detroit Tigers	86	75	.534	2½
Seattle Mariners	86	76	.531	3
New York Yankees	84	78	.519	5
Houston Astros	84	78	.519	5
Kansas City Royals	81	81	.500	8
Chicago White Sox	78	84	.481	11
Los Angeles Angels	74	88	.457	15
Oakland Athletics	69	93	.426	20
Tampa Bay Rays	68	94	.420	21
Minnesota Twins	59	103	.364	30

=== Record against opponents ===
2016 American League record Source: MLB Standings Grid – 2016
Team	BAL	BOS	CWS	CLE	DET	HOU	KC	LAA	MIN	NYY	OAK	SEA	TB	TEX	TOR	NL
Baltimore	—	8–11	4–3	5–1	5–2	1–6	4–2	4–2	5–1	10–9	3–4	1–6	13–6	3–4	9–10	14–6
Boston	11–8	—	3–4	4–2	2–5	5–2	2–4	4–3	4–3	11–8	5–1	4–3	12–7	3–3	9–10	14–6
Chicago	3–4	4–3	—	8–11	7–12	3–3	5–14	2–5	12–7	3–3	5–2	4–3	4–3	4–2	5–1	9–11
Cleveland	1–5	2–4	11–8	—	14–4	3–4	14–5	6–1	10–9	2–5	4–2	3–4	5–1	2–5	4–3	13–7
Detroit	2–5	5–2	12–7	4–14	—	4–2	7–12	2–4	15–4	3–3	4–3	4–3	6–1	2–4	3–4	13–7
Houston	6–1	2–5	3–3	4–3	2–4	—	3–4	13–6	5–2	2–4	13–6	11–8	3–3	4–15	2–5	11–9
Kansas City	2–4	4–2	14–5	5–14	12–7	4–3	—	1–5	15–4	2–5	1–6	3–4	5–2	1–6	2–4	10–10
Los Angeles	2–4	3–4	5–2	1–6	4–2	6–13	5–1	—	2–4	1–6	12–7	8–11	3–4	9–10	4–3	9–11
Minnesota	1–5	3–4	7–12	9–10	4–15	2–5	4–15	4–2	—	2–5	2–4	4–2	3–4	5–2	1–6	8–12
New York	9–10	8–11	3–3	5–2	3–3	4–2	5–2	6–1	5–2	—	4–3	3–3	11–8	3–4	7–12	8–12
Oakland	4–3	1–5	2–5	2–4	3–4	6–13	6–1	7–12	4–2	3–4	—	7–12	5–2	9–10	3–3	7–13
Seattle	6–1	3–4	3–4	4–3	3–4	8–11	4–3	11–8	2–4	3–3	12–7	—	4–2	7–12	3–3	13–7
Tampa Bay	6–13	7–12	3–4	1–5	1–6	3–3	2–5	4–3	4–3	8–11	2–5	2–4	—	4–2	11–8	10–10
Texas	4–3	3–3	2–4	5–2	4–2	15–4	6–1	10–9	2–5	4–3	10–9	12–7	2–4	—	3–4	13–7
Toronto	10–9	10–9	1–5	3–4	4–3	5–2	4–2	3–4	6–1	12–7	3–3	3–3	8–11	4–3	—	13–7

=== Game log ===
2016 Game Log: 69–93 (Home: 34–47 Away: 35–46)
April: 13–12 (Home: 5–7; Away: 8–5)

#	Date	Opponent	Score	Win	Loss	Save	Attendance	Record	Streak
1	April 4	White Sox	3–4	Sale (1–0)	**Hill** (0–1)	Robertson (1)	35,067	0–1	L1
2	April 5	White Sox	4–5	Jones (1–0)	**Doolittle** (0–1)	Robertson (2)	10,478	0–2	L2
3	April 6	White Sox	2–1	**Gray** (1–0)	Rodon (0–1)	**Madson** (1)	16,468	1–2	W1
4	April 7	White Sox	1–6	Latos (1–0)	**Graveman** (0–1)	—	12,577	1–3	L1
5	April 8	@ Mariners	3–2	**Doolittle** (1–1)	Cishek (0–1)	**Madson** (2)	47,065	2–3	W1
6	April 9	@ Mariners	6–1	**Hill** (1–1)	Karns (0–1)	—	36,424	3–3	W2
7	April 10	@ Mariners	2–1 (10)	**Axford** (1–0)	Vincent (1–1)	**Doolittle** (1)	30,834	4–3	W3
8	April 11	Angels	1–4	Tropeano (1–0)	**Gray** (1–1)	Street (2)	13,371	4–4	L1
9	April 12	Angels	4–5	Morin (1–0)	**Doolittle** (1–2)	Street (3)	13,492	4–5	L2
10	April 13	Angels	1–5	Shoemaker (1–1)	**Surkamp** (0–1)	—	11,216	4–6	L3
11	April 15	Royals	2–4	Vólquez (2–0)	**Hill** (1–2)	Davis (5)	19,451	4–7	L4
12	April 16	Royals	5–3	**Gray** (2–1)	Young (0–3)	**Madson** (3)	25,564	5–7	W1
13	April 17	Royals	3–2	**Axford** (2–0)	Soria (1–1)	**Madson** (4)	29,668	6–7	W2
14	April 19	@ Yankees	3–2 (11)	**Rodriguez** (1–0)	Barbato (1–1)	**Madson** (5)	31,952	7–7	W3
15	April 20	@ Yankees	5–2	**Graveman** (1–1)	Eovaldi (0–2)	**Doolittle** (2)	37,396	8–7	W4
16	April 21	@ Yankees	7–3	**Hill** (2–2)	Shreve (1–1)	**Madson** (6)	33,818	9–7	W5
17	April 22	@ Blue Jays	8–5	**Gray** (3–1)	Sanchez (1–1)	**Madson** (7)	34,251	10–7	W6
18	April 23	@ Blue Jays	3–9	Happ (3–0)	**Bassitt** (0–1)	—	46,334	10–8	L1
19	April 24	@ Blue Jays	3–6	Hutchison (1–0)	**Surkamp** (0–2)	Osuna (6)	46,300	10–9	L2
20	April 25	@ Tigers	3–7	Zimmermann (4–0)	**Graveman** (1–2)	—	21,671	10–10	L3
21	April 26	@ Tigers	5–1	**Hill** (3–2)	Pelfrey (0–4)	—	22,256	11–10	W1
22	April 27	@ Tigers	4–9	Verlander (2–2)	**Gray** (3–2)	—	22,636	11–11	L1
23	April 28	@ Tigers	3–7	Sánchez (3–2)	**Bassitt** (0–2)	Rodríguez (5)	26,200	11–12	L2
24	April 29	Astros	7–4	**Madson** (1–0)	Sipp (0–1)	—	20,159	12–12	W1
25	April 30	Astros	2–0	**Hahn** (1–0)	Devenski (0–1)	**Madson** (8)	23,084	13–12	W2

May: 11–17 (Home: 7–9; Away: 4–8)

#	Date	Opponent	Score	Win	Loss	Save	Attendance	Record	Streak
26	May 1	Astros	1–2	Fister (2–3)	**Hill** (3–3)	Gregerson (5)	24,135	13–13	L1
27	May 2	Mariners	3–4	Karns (3–1)	**Graveman** (1–3)	Cishek (7)	10,535	13–14	L2
28	May 3	Mariners	2–8	Iwakuma (1–3)	**Gray** (3–3)	—	12,584	13–15	L3
29	May 4	Mariners	8–9	Montgomery (1–0)	**Axford** (2–1)	Cishek (8)	16,238	13–16	L4
—	May 6	@ Orioles	Postponed (rain). To be made up as a doubleheader May 7.						
30	May 7	@ Orioles	8–4	**Hill** (4–3)	Wright (1–3)	—	15,110	14–16	W1
31	May 7	@ Orioles	2–5	Jiménez (2–3)	**Hahn** (1–1)	Britton (7)	29,862	14–17	L1
32	May 8	@ Orioles	3–11	Tillman (4–1)	**Graveman** (1–4)	—	43,690	14–18	L2
33	May 9	@ Red Sox	7–14	Buchholz (2–3)	**Gray** (3–4)	—	35,227	14–19	L3
34	May 10	@ Red Sox	5–13	O'Sullivan (1–0)	**Manaea** (0–1)	—	32,167	14–20	L4
35	May 11	@ Red Sox	3–13	Porcello (6–1)	**Surkamp** (0–3)	—	33,283	14–21	L5
36	May 13	@ Rays	6–3	**Hill** (5–3)	Odorizzi (0–2)	**Madson** (9)	14,604	15–21	W1
37	May 14	@ Rays	0–6	Andriese (2–0)	**Graveman** (1–5)	—	28,158	15–22	L1
38	May 15	@ Rays	7–6	**Axford** (3–1)	Geltz (0–2)	**Madson** (10)	19,545	16–22	W1
39	May 16	Rangers	3–1	**Manaea** (1–1)	Holland (3–3)	**Madson** (11)	10,068	17–22	W2
40	May 17	Rangers	8–5	**Madson** (2–0)	Tolleson (0–2)	—	12,718	18–22	W3
41	May 18	Rangers	8–1	**Hill** (6–3)	Perez (1–4)	—	14,323	19–22	W4
42	May 19	Yankees	1–4	Nova (3–1)	**Graveman** (1–6)	Chapman (5)	17,456	19–23	L1
43	May 20	Yankees	3–8	Sabathia (3–2)	**Gray** (3–5)	—	28,235	19–24	L2
44	May 21	Yankees	1–5	Tanaka (2–0)	**Manaea** (1–2)	—	26,356	19–25	L3
45	May 22	Yankees	4–5	Pineda (2–5)	**Hahn** (1–2)	Chapman (6)	25,237	19–26	L4
46	May 23	@ Mariners	5–0	**Hill** (7–3)	Walker (2–4)	—	16,370	20–26	W1
47	May 24	@ Mariners	5–6	Montgomery (2–0)	**Madson** (2–1)	—	17,471	20–27	L1
48	May 25	@ Mariners	3–13	Iwakuma (3–4)	**Neal** (0–1)	—	19,227	20–28	L2
49	May 27	Tigers	1–4	Fulmer (4–1)	**Manaea** (1–3)	—	22,498	20–29	L3
50	May 28	Tigers	12–3	**Hahn** (2–2)	Saupold (1–1)	—	24,154	21–29	W1
51	May 29	Tigers	4–2	**Hill** (8–3)	Pelfrey (0–5)	**Doolittle** (3)	20,522	22–29	W2
52	May 30	Twins	3–2	**Graveman** (2–6)	Santana (1–4)	**Madson** (12)	17,248	23–29	W3
53	May 31	Twins	7–4	**Dull** (1–0)	Duffey (2–4)	**Axford** (1)	12,767	24–29	W4

June: 11–15 (Home: 5–7; Away: 6–8)

#	Date	Opponent	Score	Win	Loss	Save	Attendance	Record	Streak
54	June 1	Twins	5–1	**Manaea** (2–3)	Dean (1–2)	—	11,345	25–29	W5
55	June 3	@ Astros	2–12	Fister (5–3)	**Hahn** (2–3)	—	26,458	25–30	L1
56	June 4	@ Astros	5–6 (12)	Feldman (3–3)	**Madson** (2–2)	—	37,223	25–31	L2
57	June 5	@ Astros	2–5	McCullers (3–1)	**Dull** (1–1)	Harris (1)	30,817	25–32	L3
58	June 7	@ Brewers	4–5	Davies (2–4)	**Manaea** (2–4)	Jeffress (16)	19,283	25–33	L4
59	June 8	@ Brewers	0–4	Anderson (4–6)	**Hahn** (2–4)	—	18,188	25–34	L5
60	June 10	@ Reds	1–2	Wood (5–1)	**Gray** (3–6)	Cingrani (6)		25–35	L6
61	June 11	@ Reds	1–2	Straily (4–2)	**Mengden** (0–1)	Ohlendorf (1)	32,034	25–36	L7
62	June 12	@ Reds	6–1	**Rodriguez** (2–0)	Lamb (1–4)	—	24,880	26–36	W1
63	June 13	Rangers	14–5	**Coulombe** (1–0)	Ramos (1–3)	**Neal** (1)	13,453	27–36	W2
64	June 14	Rangers	6–10	Perez (6–4)	**Surkamp** (0–4)	—	13,101	27–37	L1
65	June 15	Rangers	5–7	Martinez (1–1)	**Axford** (3–2)	Dyson (11)	10,115	27–38	L2
66	June 16	Rangers	1–5	Lewis (6–0)	**Mengden** (0–2)	—	14,236	27–39	L3
67	June 17	Angels	3–2	**Madson** (3–2)	Salas (3–3)	—	24,591	28–39	W1
68	June 18	Angels	1–7	Lincecum (1–0)	**Dull** (1–2)	—	25,078	28–40	L1
69	June 19	Angels	0–2	Weaver (6–6)	**Surkamp** (0–5)	—	22,846	28–41	L2
70	June 21	Brewers	5–3	**Doolittle** (2–2)	Smith (1–2)	**Madson** (13)	14,810	29–41	W1
71	June 22	Brewers	2–4	Guerra (4–1)	**Mengden** (0–3)	Thornburg (2)	13,586	29–42	L1
72	June 23	@ Angels	5–4	**Graveman** (3–6)	Lincecum (1–1)	**Doolittle** (4)	36,412	30–42	W1
73	June 24	@ Angels	7–4	**Dull** (2–2)	Salas (3–4)	**Madson** (14)	41,356	31–42	W2
74	June 25	@ Angels	7–3	**Overton** (1–0)	Chacín (3–6)	—	40,643	32–42	W3
75	June 26	@ Angels	6–7	**Street** (3–1)	Hendriks (0–1)	—	36,715	32–43	L1
76	June 27	@ Giants	8–3	**Mengden** (1–3)	Samardzija (8–5)	—	41,442	33–43	W1
77	June 28	@ Giants	13–11	**Neal** (1–1)	López (0–2)	**Madson** (15)	41,730	34–43	W2
78	June 29	Giants	7–1	**Manaea** (3–4)	Peavy (4–7)	—	32,810	35–43	W3
79	June 30	Giants	6–12	Bumgarner (9–4)	**Overton** (1–1)	—	36,067	35–44	L1

July: 12–14 (Home: 7–6; Away: 5–8)

#	Date	Opponent	Score	Win	Loss	Save	Attendance	Record	Streak
80	July 1	Pirates	3–7	Locke (8–5)	**Gray** (3–7)	—	15,710	35–45	L2
81	July 2	Pirates	2–4 (10)	Nicasio (6–6)	**Coulombe** (1–1)	Melancon (23)	28,846	35–46	L3
82	July 3	Pirates	3–6	Liriano (6–6)	**Mengden** (1–4)	Melancon (24)	21,831	35–47	L4
83	July 4	@ Twins	3–1	**Graveman** (4–6)	Nolasco (3–7)	**Madson** (16)	23,100	36–47	W1
84	July 5	@ Twins	4–11	Milone (1–2)	**Manaea** (3–5)	—	16,938	36–48	L1
85	July 6	@ Twins	0–4	Santana (3–7)	**Gray** (3–8)	0	27,657	36–49	L2
86	July 7	@ Astros	3–1	**Hill** (9–3)	Fister (8–6)	**Madson** (17)	20,933	37–49	W1
87	July 8	@ Astros	9–10	Feliz (6–1)	**Madson** (3–3)	—	31,438	37–50	L1
88	July 9	@ Astros	3–2	**Graveman** (5–6)	McCullers (4–3)	**Dull** (1)	35.312	38–50	W1
89	July 10	@ Astros	1–2 (10)	Harris (1–1)	**Hendriks** (0–2)	—	28,119	38–51	L1
**87th All-Star Game in San Diego, California**
90	July 15	Blue Jays	8–7	**Dull** (3–2)	Cecil (0–6)	**Madson** (18)	19,192	39–51	W1
91	July 16	Blue Jays	5–4	**Gray** (4–8)	Dickey (7–10)	**Madson** (19)	27,510	40–51	W2
92	July 17	Blue Jays	3–5	Grilli (4–3)	**Axford** (3–3)	Osuna (6)	21,626	40–52	L1
93	July 18	Astros	7–4	**Graveman** (6–6)	Fiers (6–4)	**Madson** (20)	10,651	41–52	W1
94	July 19	Astros	4–3 (10)	**Rzepczynski** (1–0)	Neshek (2–2)	—	15,143	42–52	W2
95	July 20	Astros	0–7	Fister (10–6)	**Mengden** (1–5)	—	20,306	42–53	L1
96	July 21	Rays	3–7	Moore (6–7)	**Gray** (4–9)	Colomé (21)	14,412	42–54	L2
97	July 22	Rays	1–0 (13)	**Axford** (4–3)	Floro (0–1)	—	15,250	43–54	W1
98	July 23	Rays	4–3	**Graveman** (7–6)	Colomé (1–3)	—	30,436	44–54	W2
99	July 24	Rays	3–2	**Dull** (4–2)	Ramírez (7–8)	**Madson** (21)	17,642	45–54	W3
100	July 25	@ Rangers	6–7	Diekman (2–3)	**Madson** (3–4)	—	27,292	45–55	L1
101	July 26	@ Rangers	6–3	**Gray** (5–9)	Martinez (1–3)	—	25,272	46–55	W1
102	July 27	@ Rangers	6–4	**Dull** (5–2)	Bush (3–2)	**Madson** (21)	29,630	47–55	W2
103	July 29	@ Indians	3–5	Anderson (2–4)	**Graveman** (7–7)	Allen (20)	33,134	47–56	L1
104	July 30	@ Indians	3–6	Tomlin (11–3)	**Overton** (1–2)	—	32,850	47–57	L2
105	July 31	@ Indians	0–8	Kluber (10–8)	**Gray** (5–10)	—	23,739	47–58	L3

August: 10–18 (Home: 6–10; Away: 4–8)

#	Date	Opponent	Score	Win	Loss	Save	Attendance	Record	Streak
106	August 2	@ Angels	4–5	Shoemaker (6–11)	**Manaea** (3–6)	Bedrosian (1)	36,052	47–59	L4
107	August 3	@ Angels	6–8	Morin (2–1)	**Dull** (5–3)	—	37,306	47–60	L5
108	August 4	@ Angels	8–6 (10)	**Madson** (4–4)	Morin (2–2)	**Dull** (2)	34,196	48–60	W1
109	August 5	Cubs	2–7	Lester (12–4)	**Overton** (1–3)	—	25,182	48–61	L1
110	August 6	Cubs	0–4	Arrieta (13–5)	**Gray** (5–11)	—	32,358	48–62	L2
111	August 7	Cubs	1–3	Hendricks (11–7)	**Manaea** (3–7)	Chapman (23)	23,450	48–63	L3
112	August 8	Orioles	3–2	**Graveman** (8–7)	Gausman (3–9)	**Madson** (23)	10,407	49–63	W1
113	August 9	Orioles	2–1	**Neal** (2–1)	Miley (7–10)	**Madson** (24)	13,573	50–63	W2
114	August 10	Orioles	1–0	**Detwiler** (1–0)	Gallardo (4–4)	Axford (2)	13,481	51–63	W3
115	August 11	Orioles	6–9	Tillman (15–4)	**Triggs** (0–1)	Britton (35)	16,610	51–64	L1
116	August 12	Mariners	6–3	**Manaea** (4–7)	Wieland (0–1)	**Madson** (25)	14,073	52–64	W1
117	August 13	Mariners	3–4	Iwakuma (14–7)	**Graveman** (8–8)	Díaz (6)	35,067	52–65	L1
118	August 14	Mariners	4–8	LeBlanc (2–0)	**Neal** (2–2)	—	21,203	52–66	L2
119	August 15	@ Rangers	2–5	Pérez (8–8)	**Detwiler** (1–1)	Dyson (27)	22,845	52–67	L3
120	August 16	@ Rangers	4–5 (10)	Kela (4–1)	**Axford** (4–4)	—	21,877	52–68	L4
121	August 17	@ Rangers	2–6	Darvish (4–3)	**Manaea** (4–8)	—	26,743	52–69	L5
122	August 19	@ White Sox	9–0	**Graveman** (9–8)	Shields (5–15)	—	20,011	53–69	W1
123	August 20	@ White Sox	2–6	Sale (15–6)	**Detwiler** (1–2)	Robertson (31)	21,178	53–70	L1
124	August 21	@ White Sox	2–4	Quintana (10-9)	**Neal** (2–3)	Robertson (32)	23,030	53–71	L2
125	August 22	Indians	0–1	Carrasco (9–6)	**Dull** (5–4)	Miller (11)	10,114	53–72	L3
126	August 23	Indians	9–1	**Manaea** (5–8)	Salazar (11–5)	—	13,141	54–72	W1
127	August 24	Indians	5–1	**Graveman** (10–8)	Bauer (9–6)	—	12,795	55–72	W2
128	August 26	@ Cardinals	1–3	Weaver (1–1)	**Detwiler** (1–3)	Oh (13)	40,221	55–73	L1
129	August 27	@ Cardinals	3–2	**Coulombe** (2–1)	Bowman (2–5)	**Madson** (26)	41,607	56–73	W1
130	August 28	@ Cardinals	7–4	**Triggs** (1–1)	Garcia (10–10)	**Madson** (27)	42,239	57–73	W2
131	August 29	@ Astros	0–6	Musgrove (2–2)	**Manaea** (5–9)	—	18,613	57–74	L1
132	August 30	@ Astros	1–3	McHugh (9–10)	**Graveman** (10–9)	Giles (6)	23,114	57–75	L2
133	August 31	@ Astros	3–4	Feliz (8–1)	**Hendriks** (0–3)	Giles (7)	20,033	57–76	L3

September: 10–17 (Home: 4–6; Away: 6–11)

#	Date	Opponent	Score	Win	Loss	Save	Attendance	Record	Streak
134	September 2	Red Sox	2–16	Price (14–8)	**Neal** (2–4)	—	21,376	57–77	L4
135	September 3	Red Sox	2–11	Porcello (19–3)	**Mengden** (1–6)	—	30,045	57–78	L5
136	September 4	Red Sox	1–0	**Madson** (5–4)	Kimbrel (2–4)	—	25,139	58–78	W1
137	September 5	Angels	7–10	Valdez (1–1)	**Alcántara** (0–1)	Bailey (2)	18,149	58–79	L1
138	September 6	Angels	3–2	**Axford** (5–4)	Nolasco (5–13)	**Madson** (28)	12,298	59–79	W1
139	September 7	Angels	4–1	**Cotton** (1–0)	Meyer (0–2)	**Madson** (29)		60–79	W2
140	September 9	Mariners	2–3	Iwakuma (15–11)	**Mengden** (1–7)	Díaz (14)	19,385	60–80	L1
141	September 10	Mariners	3–14	Hernández (11–5)	**Graveman** (10–10)	—	18,438	60–81	L2
142	September 11	Mariners	2–3	Cishek (3–6)	**Madson** (5–5)	Díaz (15)	13,610	60–82	L3
143	September 12	@ Royals	16–3	**Coulombe** (3–1)	Gee (6–8)	**Neal** (2)	31,061	61–82	W1
144	September 13	@ Royals	5–4	**Axford** (6–4)	Strahm (2–1)	**Madson** (30)	29,523	62–82	W2
145	September 14	@ Royals	8–0	**Manaea** (6–9)	Ventura (10–11)	—	30,006	63–82	W3
146	September 15	@ Royals	14–5	**Mengden** (2–7)	Volquez (10–11)	—	32,176	64–82	W4
147	September 16	@ Rangers	6–7	Dyson (2–2)	**Madson** (5–6)	—	30,486	64–83	L1
148	September 17	@ Rangers	11–2	**Alcantara** (1-1)	Darvish (5-5)	—	39,691	65–83	W1
149	September 18	@ Rangers	5–3	**Detwiler** (2-3)	Lewis (6-3)	**Dull** (3)	34,224	66–83	W2
150	September 19	Astros	2–4	Gregerson (4-1)	**Madson** (5–7)	Giles (12)	10,072	66–84	L1
151	September 20	Astros	1–2 (10)	Devenski (4-4)	**Doolittle** (2-3)	Giles (13)	12,139	66–85	L2
152	September 21	Astros	5–6	McHugh (12-10)	**Mengden** (2-8)	Gregerson (15)	11,197	66–86	L3
153	September 23	Rangers	0–3	Hamels (15-5)	**Graveman** (10-11)	Dyson (36)	26,367	66–87	L4
154	September 24	Rangers	0–5	Darvish (6-5)	**Alcantara** (1-2)	—	16,736	66–88	L5
155	September 25	Rangers	7–1	**Cotton** (2–0)	**Lewis** (6–4)	—	17,048	67–88	W1
156	September 26	@ Angels	1–2	Ramirez (3–4)	**Dull** (5–5)	Bailey (6)	29,934	67–89	L1
157	September 27	@ Angels	1–8	Nolasco (8–14)	**Mengden** (2–9)	—	27,531	67–90	L2
158	September 28	@ Angels	6–8	Achter (1–0)	**Detwiler** (2–4)	Ramirez (2)	32,524	67–91	L3
159	September 29	@ Mariners	2–3	Cishek (4–6)	**Hendricks** (0–4)	Díaz (18)	19,796	67–92	L4
160	September 30	@ Mariners	1–5	Walker (8–11)	**Alcantara** (1–3)	—	24,088	67–93	L5

October: 2–0 (Home: 0–0; Away: 2–0)

#	Date	Opponent	Score	Win	Loss	Save	Attendance	Record	Streak
161	October 1	@ Mariners	9–8 (10)	**Madson** (6–7)	Díaz (0–4)	—	29,522	68–93	W1
162	October 2	@ Mariners	3–2	**Manaea** (7–9)	Hernández (11–8)	**Axford** (3)	24,856	69–93	W2

Legend: = Win = Loss = Postponement
Bold = Athletics team member

== Roster ==
2016 Oakland Athletics
Roster
Pitchers: 50 Raúl Alcántara; 61 John Axford; 40 Chris Bassitt; 45 Jharel Cotton; 57 Daniel Coulombe; 46 Ross Detwiler; 62 Sean Doolittle; 66 Ryan Dull; 49 Kendall Graveman; 54 Sonny Gray; 32 Jesse Hahn; 31 Liam Hendriks; 18 Rich Hill; 44 Ryan Madson; 55 Sean Manaea; 67 Daniel Mengden; 58 Zach Neal; 47 Dillon Overton; 33 Fernando Rodriguez; 35 Marc Rzepczynski; 68 Patrick Schuster; 56 Chris Smith; 48 Eric Surkamp; 60 Andrew Triggs; 64 J. B. Wendelken	Catchers: 63 Bruce Maxwell; 29 Matt McBride; 19 Josh Phegley; 21 Stephen Vogt; Infielders: 17 Yonder Alonso; 16 Billy Butler; 20 Mark Canha; 3 Chris Coghlan; 48 Ryon Healy; 25 Tyler Ladendorf; 8 Jed Lowrie; 12 Max Muncy; 18 Chad Pinder; 10 Marcus Semien; 26 Danny Valencia; 52 Joey Wendle	Outfielders: 30 Arismendy Alcántara; 1 Billy Burns; 4 Coco Crisp; 2 Khris Davis; 39 Brett Eibner; 13 Matt Olson; 22 Josh Reddick; 5 Jake Smolinski; Other batters: 15 Andrew Lambo; 22 Renato Núñez	Manager: 6 Bob Melvin; Coaches: 14 Mike Aldrete (first base); 51 Darren Bush (hitting); 65 Scott Emerson (bullpen); 59 Marcus Jensen (assistant hitting); 7 Mark Kotsay (bench); 88 Philip Pohl (bullpen catcher); 38 Ron Washington (third base); 41 Curt Young (pitching)

== Player stats ==
=== Batting ===
Note: G = Games played; AB = At bats; R = Runs; H = Hits; 2B = Doubles; 3B = Triples; HR = Home runs; RBI = Runs batted in; SB = Stolen bases; BB = Walks; AVG = Batting average; SLG = Slugging average

Player	G	AB	R	H	2B	3B	HR	RBI	SB	BB	AVG	SLG
Marcus Semien	159	568	72	135	27	2	27	75	10	51	.238	.435
Khris Davis	150	555	85	137	24	2	42	102	1	42	.247	.524
Stephen Vogt	137	490	54	123	30	2	14	56	0	35	.251	.406
Yonder Alonso	156	482	52	122	34	0	7	56	3	45	.253	.367
Danny Valencia	130	471	72	135	22	1	17	51	1	41	.287	.446
Coco Crisp	102	393	45	92	24	4	11	47	7	37	.234	.399
Jed Lowrie	87	338	30	89	12	1	2	27	0	26	.263	.322
Jake Smolinski	99	290	28	69	6	2	7	27	1	19	.238	.345
Billy Burns	73	274	32	64	11	4	0	12	14	10	.234	.303
Ryon Healy	72	269	36	82	20	0	13	37	0	12	.305	.524
Josh Reddick	68	243	33	72	11	1	8	28	5	28	.296	.449
Billy Butler	85	221	24	61	16	0	4	31	0	19	.276	.403
Chris Coghlan	51	158	14	23	5	0	5	14	1	13	.146	.272
Max Muncy	51	113	13	21	2	0	2	8	0	20	.186	.257
Brett Eibner	44	109	10	18	4	1	3	12	0	13	.165	.303
Joey Wendle	28	96	11	25	1	0	1	11	2	6	.260	.302
Bruce Maxwell	33	92	8	26	6	1	1	14	0	8	.283	.402
Josh Phegley	25	78	11	20	6	0	1	10	0	5	.256	.372
Chad Pinder	22	51	4	12	4	0	1	4	0	3	.235	.373
Tyler Ladendorf	44	48	6	4	0	0	0	1	2	1	.083	.083
Matt McBride	20	43	4	9	3	0	0	2	0	1	.209	.279
Mark Canha	16	41	4	5	0	0	3	6	0	0	.122	.341
Matt Olson	11	21	3	2	1	0	0	0	0	7	.095	.143
Arismendy Alcántara	16	19	2	4	1	0	0	2	3	0	.211	.263
Renato Núñez	9	15	0	2	0	0	0	1	0	0	.133	.133
Andrew Lambo	1	1	0	0	0	0	0	0	0	0	.000	.000
Pitcher totals	162	21	0	0	0	0	0	0	0	0	.000	.000
Team totals	162	5500	653	1352	270	21	169	634	50	442	.246	.395

=== Pitching ===
Note: W = Wins; L = Losses; ERA = Earned run average; G = Games pitched; GS = Games started; SV = Saves; IP = Innings pitched; H = Hits allowed; R = Runs allowed; ER = Earned runs allowed; BB = Walks allowed; SO = strikeouts

Player	W	L	ERA	G	GS	SV	IP	H	R	ER	BB	SO
Kendall Graveman	10	11	4.11	31	31	0	186.0	196	87	85	47	108
Sean Manaea	7	9	3.86	25	24	0	144.2	135	65	62	37	124
Sonny Gray	5	11	5.69	22	22	0	117.0	133	80	74	42	94
Rich Hill	9	3	2.25	14	14	0	76.0	55	22	19	28	90
Ryan Dull	5	5	2.42	70	0	3	74.1	50	23	20	15	73
Daniel Mengden	2	9	6.50	14	14	0	72.0	83	54	52	33	71
Zach Neal	2	4	4.24	24	6	2	70.2	72	35	33	6	27
John Axford	6	4	3.97	68	0	3	65.2	65	30	29	30	60
Liam Hendriks	0	4	3.76	53	0	0	64.2	69	31	27	14	71
Ryan Madson	6	7	3.62	63	0	30	64.2	63	27	26	20	49
Andrew Triggs	1	1	4.31	24	6	0	56.1	56	30	27	13	55
Danny Coulombe	3	1	4.53	35	0	0	47.2	37	24	24	17	54
Jesse Hahn	2	4	6.02	9	9	0	46.1	57	32	31	19	23
Ross Detwiler	2	4	6.14	9	7	0	44.0	56	31	30	15	23
Fernando Rodriguez	2	0	4.20	34	0	0	40.2	30	19	19	17	37
Sean Doolittle	2	3	3.23	44	0	4	39.0	33	14	14	8	45
Eric Surkamp	0	5	6.98	9	9	0	38.2	55	32	30	21	22
Marc Rzepczynski	1	0	3.00	56	0	0	36.0	38	14	12	24	37
Jharel Cotton	2	0	2.15	5	5	0	29.1	20	10	7	4	23
Chris Bassitt	0	2	6.11	5	5	0	28.0	35	20	19	14	23
Chris Smith	0	0	2.92	13	0	0	24.2	14	9	8	13	29
Dillon Overton	1	3	11.47	7	5	0	24.1	48	31	31	7	17
Raúl Alcántara	1	3	7.25	5	5	0	22.1	31	18	18	4	14
J.B. Wendelken	0	0	9.95	8	0	0	12.2	18	15	14	9	12
Patrick Schuster	0	0	10.80	5	0	0	6.2	9	8	8	6	6
Tyler Ladendorf	0	0	0.00	1	0	0	1.0	1	0	0	1	0
Josh Phegley	0	0	0.00	1	0	0	0.2	0	0	0	0	1
Team totals	69	93	4.51	162	162	42	1433.1	1459	761	718	464	1188

== Farm system ==
Level	Team	League	Manager
AAA	Nashville Sounds	Pacific Coast League	Steve Scarsone
AA	Midland RockHounds	Texas League	Ryan Christenson
A-Advanced	Stockton Ports	California League	Rick Magnante
A	Beloit Snappers	Midwest League	Fran Riordan
A-Short Season	Vermont Lake Monsters	New York–Penn League	Aaron Nieckula
Rookie	AZL Athletics	Arizona League	Webster Garrison

LEAGUE CHAMPIONS: Midland
