= 2016 Kansas City Royals season =

2016 Kansas City Royals
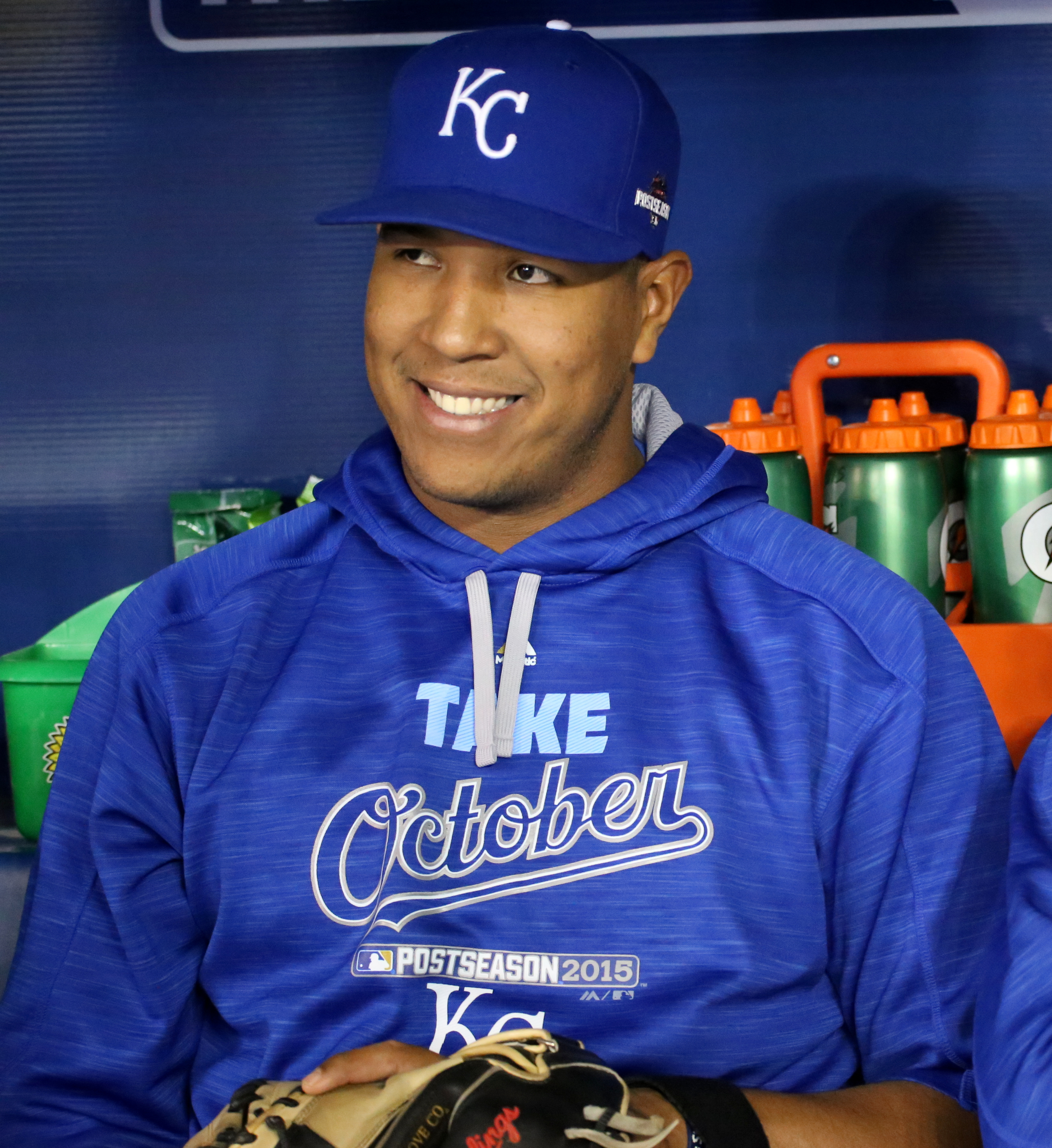
- Salvador Pérez ("Salvy") as a member of the Kansas City Royals
- League: American League
- Division: Central
- Ballpark: Kauffman Stadium
- City: Kansas City, Missouri
- Record: 81–81 (.500)
- Divisional place: 3rd
- Owners: David Glass
- General managers: Dayton Moore
- Managers: Ned Yost
- Television: Fox Sports Kansas City (Ryan Lefebvre, Jeff Montgomery, Rex Hudler, Steve Physioc)
- Radio: KCSP 610 AM (Denny Matthews, Steve Stewart, Ryan Lefebvre, Steve Physioc)

The 2016 Kansas City Royals season was the 48th season for the franchise, and their 44th at Kauffman Stadium. It was also the team's 11th season under the management of Dayton Moore. The Royals entered the season as the defending World Series champions, hoping to reach the World Series for the third consecutive season. Before the season, the team signed free agents Ian Kennedy (a starting pitcher) and Joakim Soria (a reliever) and re-signed star Alex Gordon. However, several players from the previous year's team departed in free agency, including right fielder Alex Rios, second baseman/outfielder Ben Zobrist, and pitchers Greg Holland, Ryan Madson, and Franklin Morales.

The 2016 Royals team was adversely affected by injuries to Gordon, center fielder Lorenzo Cain, closer Wade Davis, and third baseman Mike Moustakas. The team was eliminated from postseason contention with four games left in the season, becoming the fourth consecutive World Series winner to miss the playoffs the following year. However, the Royals were the most successful team in the league at challenging umpire calls via instant replay thanks to the work of replay coordinator Bill Duplissea. The Royals ended the season with an 81–81 record, finishing in third place in the Central Division.

== Season standings ==
=== American League Central ===
AL Central
Team	W	L	Pct.	GB	Home	Road
Cleveland Indians	94	67	.584	—	53‍–‍28	41‍–‍39
Detroit Tigers	86	75	.534	8	45‍–‍35	41‍–‍40
Kansas City Royals	81	81	.500	13½	47‍–‍34	34‍–‍47
Chicago White Sox	78	84	.481	16½	45‍–‍36	33‍–‍48
Minnesota Twins	59	103	.364	35½	30‍–‍51	29‍–‍52

=== American League division leaders ===
Division leaders
Team	W	L	Pct.
Texas Rangers	95	67	.586
Cleveland Indians	94	67	.584
Boston Red Sox	93	69	.574

Wild Card teams (Top 2 teams qualify for postseason)
Team	W	L	Pct.	GB
Toronto Blue Jays	89	73	.549	—
Baltimore Orioles	89	73	.549	—
Detroit Tigers	86	75	.534	2½
Seattle Mariners	86	76	.531	3
New York Yankees	84	78	.519	5
Houston Astros	84	78	.519	5
Kansas City Royals	81	81	.500	8
Chicago White Sox	78	84	.481	11
Los Angeles Angels	74	88	.457	15
Oakland Athletics	69	93	.426	20
Tampa Bay Rays	68	94	.420	21
Minnesota Twins	59	103	.364	30

=== Record against opponents ===
2016 American League record Source: MLB Standings Grid – 2016
Team	BAL	BOS	CWS	CLE	DET	HOU	KC	LAA	MIN	NYY	OAK	SEA	TB	TEX	TOR	NL
Baltimore	—	8–11	4–3	5–1	5–2	1–6	4–2	4–2	5–1	10–9	3–4	1–6	13–6	3–4	9–10	14–6
Boston	11–8	—	3–4	4–2	2–5	5–2	2–4	4–3	4–3	11–8	5–1	4–3	12–7	3–3	9–10	14–6
Chicago	3–4	4–3	—	8–11	7–12	3–3	5–14	2–5	12–7	3–3	5–2	4–3	4–3	4–2	5–1	9–11
Cleveland	1–5	2–4	11–8	—	14–4	3–4	14–5	6–1	10–9	2–5	4–2	3–4	5–1	2–5	4–3	13–7
Detroit	2–5	5–2	12–7	4–14	—	4–2	7–12	2–4	15–4	3–3	4–3	4–3	6–1	2–4	3–4	13–7
Houston	6–1	2–5	3–3	4–3	2–4	—	3–4	13–6	5–2	2–4	13–6	11–8	3–3	4–15	2–5	11–9
Kansas City	2–4	4–2	14–5	5–14	12–7	4–3	—	1–5	15–4	2–5	1–6	3–4	5–2	1–6	2–4	10–10
Los Angeles	2–4	3–4	5–2	1–6	4–2	6–13	5–1	—	2–4	1–6	12–7	8–11	3–4	9–10	4–3	9–11
Minnesota	1–5	3–4	7–12	9–10	4–15	2–5	4–15	4–2	—	2–5	2–4	4–2	3–4	5–2	1–6	8–12
New York	9–10	8–11	3–3	5–2	3–3	4–2	5–2	6–1	5–2	—	4–3	3–3	11–8	3–4	7–12	8–12
Oakland	4–3	1–5	2–5	2–4	3–4	6–13	6–1	7–12	4–2	3–4	—	7–12	5–2	9–10	3–3	7–13
Seattle	6–1	3–4	3–4	4–3	3–4	8–11	4–3	11–8	2–4	3–3	12–7	—	4–2	7–12	3–3	13–7
Tampa Bay	6–13	7–12	3–4	1–5	1–6	3–3	2–5	4–3	4–3	8–11	2–5	2–4	—	4–2	11–8	10–10
Texas	4–3	3–3	2–4	5–2	4–2	15–4	6–1	10–9	2–5	4–3	10–9	12–7	2–4	—	3–4	13–7
Toronto	10–9	10–9	1–5	3–4	4–3	5–2	4–2	3–4	6–1	12–7	3–3	3–3	8–11	4–3	—	13–7

=== Game log ===
2016 Game Log: 81–81 (Home: 47–34; Away: 34–47)
April: 12–11 (Home: 8–3; Away: 4–8)

#	Date	Opponent	Score	Win	Loss	Save	Attendance	Record	Streak
1	April 3	Mets	4–3	**Vólquez** (1–0)	Harvey (0–1)	**Davis** (1)	40,030	1–0	W1
2	April 5	Mets	0–2	Syndergaard (1–0)	**Young** (0–1)	Familia (1)	39,782	1–1	L1
3	April 8	Twins	4–3	**Soria** (1–0)	Jepsen (0–2)	**Davis** (2)	27,166	2–1	W1
4	April 9	Twins	7–0	**Kennedy** (1–0)	Milone (0–1)	—	31,001	3–1	W2
5	April 10	Twins	4–3	**Davis** (1–0)	May (0–1)	—	35,317	4–1	W3
6	April 11	@ Astros	2–8	McHugh (1–1)	**Young** (0–2)	—	43,332	4–2	L1
7	April 12	@ Astros	3–2	**Medlen** (1–0)	Fiers (0–1)	**Davis** (3)	21,027	5–2	W1
8	April 13	@ Astros	4–2	**Hochevar** (1–0)	Giles (0–1)	**Soria** (1)	24,109	6–2	W2
9	April 14	@ Astros	6–2	**Kennedy** (2–0)	Fister (1–1)	**Davis** (4)	21,203	7–2	W3
10	April 15	@ Athletics	4–2	**Vólquez** (1–0)	Hill (1–2)	**Davis** (5)	19,451	8–2	W4
11	April 16	@ Athletics	3–5	Gray (2–1)	**Young** (0–3)	Madson (3)	25,564	8–3	L1
12	April 17	@ Athletics	2–3	Axford (2–0)	**Soria** (1–1)	Madson (4)	29,668	8–4	L2
13	April 19	Tigers	8–6	**Ventura** (1–0)	Greene (1–1)	**Davis** (6)	26,889	9–4	W1
14	April 20	Tigers	2–3	Zimmermann (3–0)	**Kennedy** (2–1)	Rodríguez (4)	28,928	9–5	L1
15	April 21	Tigers	4–0	**Vólquez** (3–0)	Pelfrey (0–3)	—	30,763	10–5	W1
16	April 22	Orioles	4–2	**Young** (1–3)	Gallardo (1–1)	**Davis** (7)	29,546	11–5	W2
17	April 23	Orioles	3–8	Wilson (1–0)	**Medlen** (1–1)	—	39,900	11–6	L1
18	April 24	Orioles	6–1	**Ventura** (2–0)	Wright (1–2)	—	34,748	12–6	W1
19	April 25	@ Angels	1–6	Richards (1–3)	**Kennedy** (2–2)	—	31,061	12–7	L1
20	April 26	@ Angels	4–9	Weaver (3–0)	**Vólquez** (3–1)	—	34,428	12–8	L2
21	April 27	@ Angels	2–4	Salas (1–1)	**Young** (1–4)	Smith (1)	35,142	12–9	L3
22	April 29	@ Mariners	0–1	Hernández (2–2)	**Medlen** (1–2)	Cishek (6)	38,684	12–10	L4
23	April 30	@ Mariners	0–6	Miley (2–2)	**Ventura** (2–1)	—	43,444	12–11	L5

May: 17–11 (Home: 10–4; Away: 7–7)

#	Date	Opponent	Score	Win	Loss	Save	Attendance	Record	Streak
24	May 1	@ Mariners	4–1	**Kennedy** (3–2)	Walker (2–1)	**Davis** (8)	37,053	13–11	W1
25	May 2	Nationals	0–2	Gonzalez (2–1)	**Vólquez** (3–2)	Papelbon (9)	32,394	13–12	L1
26	May 3	Nationals	7–6	**Wang** (1–0)	Papelbon (0–2)	—	33,729	14–12	W1
27	May 4	Nationals	2–13	Strasburg (5–0)	**Medlen** (1–3)	—	38,610	14–13	L1
28	May 6	@ Indians	1–7	Salazar (3–2)	**Ventura** (2–2)	—	13,587	14–14	L2
29	May 7	@ Indians	7–0	**Kennedy** (4–2)	Anderson (0–2)	—	17,302	15–14	W1
30	May 8	@ Indians	4–5	Tomlin (5–0)	**Vólquez** (3–3)	Allen (8)	14,463	15–15	L1
31	May 9	@ Yankees	3–6	Yates (2–0)	**Young** (1–5)	—	41,243	15–16	L2
32	May 10	@ Yankees	7–10	Miller (2–0)	**Herrera** (0–1)	Chapman (1)	39,128	15–17	L3
33	May 11	@ Yankees	7–3	**Ventura** (3–2)	Pineda (1–4)	—	31,226	16–17	W1
34	May 12	@ Yankees	3–7	Eovaldi (3–2)	**Kennedy** (4–3)	—	35,944	16–18	L1
35	May 13	Braves	5–1	**Vólquez** (4–3)	Teherán (0–4)	—	33,132	17–18	W1
36	May 14	Braves	0–5	Foltynewicz (1–1)	**Gee** (0–1)	—	36,541	17–19	L1
37	May 15	Braves	4–2 (13)	**Wang** (2–0)	O'Flaherty (0–3)	—	33,861	18–19	W1
–	May 16	Red Sox	Postponed (rain). Makeup date: May 18th.						
38	May 17	Red Sox	8–4	**Ventura** (4–2)	Porcello (6–2)	—	25,215	19–19	W2
39	May 18	Red Sox	3–2	**Flynn** (1–0)	Wright (3–4)	**Davis** (9)	33,613	20–19	W3
40	May 18	Red Sox	2–5	Price (6–1)	**Vólquez** (4–4)	Kimbrel (11)	23,739	20–20	L1
41	May 20	@ White Sox	4–1	**Gee** (1–1)	Quintana (5–3)	**Davis** (10)	24,020	21–20	W1
42	May 21	@ White Sox	2–1	**Soria** (2–1)	González (0–1)	**Davis** (11)	27,631	22–20	W2
43	May 22	@ White Sox	2–3	Rodon (2–4)	**Ventura** (4–3)	Robertson (11)	34,526	22–21	L1
44	May 23	@ Twins	10–4	**Moylan** (1–0)	Nolasco (1–3)	—	17,886	23–21	W1
45	May 24	@ Twins	7–4	**Vólquez** (5–4)	Santana (1–3)	**Davis** (12)	23,541	24–21	W2
46	May 25	@ Twins	5–7	Duffey (2–3)	**Gee** (1–2)	Jepsen (4)	27,233	24–22	L1
–	May 26	White Sox	Postponed (rain). Makeup date: TBA.						
47	May 27	White Sox	7–5	**Moylan** (2–0)	Albers (1–4)	**Davis** (13)	28,508	25–22	W1
48	May 28	White Sox	8–7	**Wang** (2–0)	Kahnle (0–1)	—	31,598	26–22	W2
49	May 29	White Sox	5–4	**Young** (2–5)	Jones (2–1)	**Davis** (14)	36,624	27–22	W3
50	May 30	Rays	6–2	**Herrera** (1–1)	Ramírez (6–3)	—	32,018	28–22	W4
51	May 31	Rays	10–5	**Gee** (2–2)	Smyly (2–7)	**Davis** (15)	26,006	29–22	W5

June: 13–14 (Home: 9–4; Away: 4–10)

#	Date	Opponent	Score	Win	Loss	Save	Attendance	Record	Streak
52	June 1	Rays	6–3	**Duffy** (1–0)	Archer (3–7)	**Davis** (16)	30,554	30–22	W6
53	June 2	@ Indians	4–5	Hunter (2–1)	**Soria** (2–2)	—	11,131	30–23	L1
54	June 3	@ Indians	1–6	Salazar (6–3)	**Vólquez** (5–5)	—	24,753	30–24	L2
55	June 4	@ Indians	1–7	Tomlin (8–1)	**Kennedy** (4–4)	—	23,258	30–25	L3
56	June 5	@ Indians	0–7	Kluber (5–6)	**Young** (2–6)	—	16,747	30–26	L4
57	June 6	@ Orioles	1–4	Wright (3–3)	**Duffy** (1–1)	Britton (18)	14,878	30–27	L5
58	June 7	@ Orioles	1–9	Jiménez (3–6)	**Ventura** (4–4)		28,110	30–28	L6
59	June 8	@ Orioles	0–4	Tillman (8–1)	**Vólquez** (5–6)	Brach (2)	19,178	30–29	L7
60	June 10	@ White Sox	7–5	Sale (10–2)	**Kennedy** (4–5)	Robertson (15)	31,183	30-30	L8
61	June 11	@ White Sox	4–1	**Duffy** (2–1)	Quintana (5–7)	—	31,183	31-30	W1
62	June 12	@ White Sox	1–3	**Ventura** (5–4)	Rodon (2–6)	**Davis** (17)	30,363	32-30	W2
63	June 13	Indians	2–1	**Vólquez** (6–6)	Carrasco (2–2)	—	31,269	33–30	W3
64	June 14	Indians	3–2	**Soria** (3–2)	Shaw (0–3)	—	29,293	34–30	W4
65	June 15	Indians	9–4	**Kennedy** (5–5)	Kluber (6–7)	—	33,546	35–30	W5
66	June 16	Tigers	4–10	Verlander (7–5)	**Hochevar** (1–1)	—	33,568	35–31	L1
67	June 17	Tigers	10–3	**Ventura** (6–4)	Fulmer (7–2)	—	37,746	36–31	W1
68	June 18	Tigers	16–5	**Vólquez** (7–6)	Boyd (0–2)	—	38,480	37–31	W2
69	June 19	Tigers	2–1 (13)	**Wang** (4–0)	Ryan (1–2)	—	34,659	38–31	W3
70	June 21	@ Mets	0–2	Robles (1–3)	**Kennedy** (5–6)	Familia (23)	40,122	38–32	L1
71	June 22	@ Mets	3–4	Syndergaard (8–2)	**Soria** (3–3)	Familia (24)	35,185	38–33	L2
72	June 24	Astros	4–13	Keuchel (4–9)	**Vólquez** (7–7)	—	36,195	38–34	L3
73	June 25	Astros	5–13	Feliz (5–1)	**Young** (2–7)	—	38,880	38–35	L4
74	June 26	Astros	6–1	**Kennedy** (6–6)	Fister (8–4)	—	36,450	39–35	W1
75	June 27	Cardinals	6–2	**Duffy** (3–1)	Wainwright (6–5)	—	31,355	40–35	W2
76	June 28	Cardinals	4–8	Wacha (4–7)	**Ventura** (6–5)	—	32,909	40–36	L1
77	June 29	@ Cardinals	3–2 (12)	**Wang** (5–0)	Maness (0–2)	—	44,840	41–36	W1
78	June 30	@ Cardinals	4–2	**Gee** (3–2)	Leake (5–6)	**Davis** (19)	44,802	42–36	W2

July: 7–19 (Home: 5–8; Away: 2–11)

#	Date	Opponent	Score	Win	Loss	Save	Attendance	Record	Streak
79	July 1	@ Phillies	3–4	Hellickson (6–6)	**Kennedy** (6–7)	Gómez (22)	30,263	42–37	L1
80	July 2	@ Phillies	6–2	**Duffy** (4–1)	Nola (5–8)	—	40,331	43–37	W1
81	July 3	@ Phillies	2–7	Velasquez (7–2)	**Ventura** (6–6)	—	20,473	43–38	L1
82	July 4	@ Blue Jays	2–6	Sanchez (9–1)	**Vólquez** (7–8)	—	36,438	43–39	L2
83	July 5	@ Blue Jays	3–8	Dickey (6–9)	**Young** (2–8)	—	35,917	43–40	L3
84	July 6	@ Blue Jays	2–4	Stroman (7–4)	**Herrera** (1–2)	Osuna (17)	39,971	43–41	L4
85	July 7	Mariners	4–3	**Pounders** (1–0)	Cishek (2–5)	—	31,425	44–41	W1
86	July 8	Mariners	2–3	Iwakuma (9–6)	**Ventura** (6–7)	Cishek (21)	33,391	44–42	L1
87	July 9	Mariners	5–3	**Vólquez** (8–8)	Miley (6–6)	**Herrera** (1)	30,659	45–42	W1
88	July 10	Mariners	5–8	Montgomery (3–3)	**Gee** (3–3)	—	27,544	45–43	L1
**87th All-Star Game in San Diego, California**
89	July 15	@ Tigers	2–4	Verlander (9–6)	**Hochevar** (1–2)	Rodríguez (25)	37,447	45–44	L2
90	July 16	@ Tigers	8–4	**Duffy** (5–1)	Pelfrey (2–9)	—	39,594	46–44	W1
91	July 17	@ Tigers	2–4	Rodríguez (1–0)	**Soria** (3–4)	—	37,363	46–45	L1
92	July 18	Indians	7–3	**Hochevar** (2–2)	Shaw (1–4)	**Davis** (20)	38,042	47–45	W1
93	July 19	Indians	3–7	Salazar (11–3)	**Flynn** (1–1)	—	31,144	47–46	L1
94	July 20	Indians	4–11	Carrasco (7–3)	**Kennedy** (6–8)	—	33,455	47–47	L2
95	July 22	Rangers	3–1	**Duffy** (6–1)	Darvish (2–2)	**Davis** (21)	33,535	48–47	W1
96	July 23	Rangers	4–7	Hamels (11–2)	**Ventura** (6–8)	—	32,132	48–48	L1
97	July 24	Rangers	1–2	Claudio (2–1)	**Hochevar** (2–3)	Dyson (20)	32,739	48–49	L2
98	July 25	Angels	2–6	Santiago (9–4)	**Kennedy** (6–9)	—	33,828	48–50	L3
99	July 26	Angels	0–13	Skaggs (1–0)	**Gee** (3–4)	—	28,026	48–51	L4
100	July 27	Angels	5–7	**Soria** (4–4)	Shoemaker (5–11)	—	30,279	49–51	W1
101	July 28	@ Rangers	2–3	Hamels (12–2)	**Ventura** (6–9)	Dyson (21)	36,008	49–52	L1
102	July 29	@ Rangers	3–8	Griffin (4–1)	**Vólquez** (8–9)	—	40,008	49–53	L2
103	July 30	@ Rangers	1–2	Bush (4–2)	**Pounders** (1–1)	—	47,125	49–54	L3
104	July 31	@ Rangers	3–5	Harrell (3–2)	**Gee** (3–5)	Dyson (22)	32,806	49–55	L4

August: 20–9 (Home: 9–4; Away:11–5)

#	Date	Opponent	Score	Win	Loss	Save	Attendance	Record	Streak
105	August 1	@ Rays	3–0	**Duffy** (7–1)	Archer (5–15)	**Herrera** (2)	13,976	50–55	W1
106	August 2	@ Rays	3–2	**Young** (3–8)	Cedeño (3–3)	**Herrera** (3)	12,625	51–55	W2
107	August 3	@ Rays	0–12	Odorizzi (6–5)	**Vólquez** (8–10)	—	11,149	51–56	L1
108	August 4	@ Rays	2–3	Boxberger (1–0)	**Soria** (4–5)	Colomé (26)	13,120	51–57	L2
109	August 5	Blue Jays	3–4	Cecil (1–6)	**Herrera** (1–3)	Benoit (1)	31,831	51–58	L3
110	August 6	Blue Jays	4–2	**Duffy** (8–1)	Sanchez (11–2)	**Herrera** (4)	35,986	52–58	W1
111	August 7	Blue Jays	7–1	**Ventura** (7–9)	Stroman (8–5)	—	25,830	53–58	W2
112	August 9	White Sox	5–7 (10)	Robertson (3–2)	**Herrera** (1–4)	Jennings (1)	27,134	53–59	L1
113	August 10	White Sox	3–2 (14)	**Gee** (4–5)	Albers (2–5)	—	25,188	54–59	W1
114	August 11	White Sox	2–1	**Duffy** (9–1)	Fulmer (0–2)	—	34,310	55–59	W2
115	August 12	@ Twins	7–3	**Ventura** (8–9)	Gibson (4–7)	—	24,617	56–59	W3
116	August 13	@ Twins	3–5	Duffey (8–8)	**Gee** (4–6)	Kintzler (11)	30,147	56–60	L1
117	August 14	@ Twins	11–4	**Vólquez** (9–10)	Santiago (10–7)	**Young** (1)	31,730	57–60	W1
118	August 15	@ Tigers	3–1	**Kennedy** (7–9)	Norris (1–1)	**Herrera** (5)	29,803	58–60	W2
119	August 16	@ Tigers	6–1	**Duffy** (10–1)	Verlander (12–7)	—	28,663	59–60	W3
120	August 17	@ Tigers	4–1	**Ventura** (8–9)	Sánchez (6–12)	**Herrera** (6)	28,790	60–60	W4
121	August 18	Twins	8–1	**Gee** (5–6)	Duffey (8–9)	—	30,599	61–60	W5
122	August 19	Twins	5–4 (11)	**Wang** (6–0)	Chargois (0–1)	—	28,463	62–60	W6
123	August 20	Twins	10–0	**Kennedy** (8–9)	Santiago (10–8)	—	29,268	63–60	W7
124	August 21	Twins	1–2	**Duffy** (11–1)	Santana (6–10)	**Herrera** (7)	32,996	64–60	W8
125	August 23	@ Marlins	1–0	**Ventura** (9–9)	Cashner (4–10)	**Herrera** (8)	18,513	65–60	W9
126	August 24	@ Marlins	0–3	Fernández (13–7)	**Gee** (5–7)	Rodney (25)	17,894	65–61	L1
127	August 25	@ Marlins	5–2	**Vólquez** (10–10)	Koehler (9–9)	**Herrera** (9)	19,045	66–61	W1
128	August 26	@ Red Sox	6–3	**Kennedy** (9–9)	Wright (13–6)	**Herrera** (10)	38,143	67–61	W2
129	August 27	@ Red Sox	3–8	Price (13–8)	**Duffy** (11–2)	—	37,933	67–62	L1
130	August 28	@ Red Sox	10–4	**Strahm** (2–0)	Rodriguez (2–6)	—	37,337	68–62	W1
131	August 29	Yankees	8–5	**Gee** (6–7)	Pineda (6–11)	**Herrera** (11)	22,859	69–62	W2
132	August 30	Yankees	4–5 (10)	Betances (3–4)	**Soria** (4–6)	Shreve (1)	22,895	69–63	L1
133	August 31	Yankees	4–5 (13)	Heller (1–0)	**Young** (3–9)	Betances (7)	22,615	69–64	L2

September: 12–15 (Home: 6–9; Away: 6–6)

#	Date	Opponent	Score	Win	Loss	Save	Attendance	Record	Streak
134	September 2	Tigers	6–7	Rodríguez (3–3)	**Davis** (1-1)	—	25,008	69–65	L3
135	September 3	Tigers	5–2	**Ventura** (10–9)	Fulmer (10–6)	**Davis** (21)	39,757	70–65	W1
136	September 4	Tigers	5–6	Greene (3–3)	**Soria** (4–7)	Rodríguez (38)	34,616	70–66	L1
137	September 5	@ Twins	11–5	**Kennedy** (10–9)	Berríos (2–5)	—	20,992	71–66	W1
138	September 6	@ Twins	10–3	**Herrera** (2–4)	Kintzler (0–2)	—	22,194	72–66	W2
139	September 7	@ Twins	5–6	Wimmers (1–1)	**Soria** (4–8)	**Kintzler** (14)	17,972	72–67	L1
140	September 9	@ White Sox	2–7	Rodon (7–8)	**Ventura** (10–10)	—	20,653	72–68	L2
141	September 10	@ White Sox	6–5	**McCarthy** (1–0)	Beck (2–2)	**Davis** (23)	20,148	73–68	W1
142	September 11	@ White Sox	2–0	**Kennedy** (11–9)	Sale (15–8)	**Davis** (24)	20,107	74–68	W2
143	September 12	Athletics	3–16	Coulombe (3–1)	**Gee** (6–8)	Neal (2)	31,061	74–69	L1
144	September 13	Athletics	4–5	Axford (6–4)	**Strahm** (2–1)	Madson (30)	29,523	74–70	L2
145	September 14	Athletics	0–8	Manaea (6–9)	**Ventura** (10–11)	—	30,006	74–71	L3
146	September 15	Athletics	5–14	Mengden (2–7)	**Volquez** (10–11)	—	32,176	74–72	L4
147	September 16	White Sox	4–7	Sale (16–8)	**Herrera** (2–5)	—	29,318	74–73	L5
148	September 17	White Sox	3–2	**Gee** (7–8)	González (4–7)	**Davis** (25)	34,805	75–73	W1
149	September 18	White Sox	10–3	**Duffy** (12–2)	Quintana (12–11)	—	34,982	76–73	W2
150	September 19	White Sox	8–3	**Ventura** (11–11)	Rodon (7–10)	—	31,502	77–73	W3
151	September 20	@ Indians	1–2	Miller (9–1)	**Flynn** (1–2)	—	13,623	77–74	L1
152	September 21	@ Indians	3–4	Kluber (18–9)	**Kennedy** (11–10)	Allen (28)	13,888	77–75	L2
153	September 22	@ Indians	2–5	Otero (5–1)	**Gee** (7–9)	Allen (29)	15,253	77–76	L3
154	September 23	@ Tigers	3–8	Fulmer (11–7)	**Duffy** (12–3)	—	29,480	77–77	L4
155	September 24	@ Tigers	7–4	**Davis** (2–1)	Rodríguez (3–4)	**Herrera** (12)	31,721	78–77	W1
156	September 25	@ Tigers	12–9	**Gee** (8–9)	Boyd (6–5)	—	33,375	79–77	W2
157	September 27	Twins	4–3 (11)	**Pounders** (2–1)	Milone (3–5)	—	28,435	80–77	W3
158	September 28	Twins	5–2	**Soria** (5–8)	Rogers (3–1)	**Davis** (27)	23,437	81–77	W4
159	September 29	Twins	6–7	Tonkin (3–2)	**Herrera** (2–6)	Kintzler (16)	29,566	81–78	L1
160	September 30	Indians	2–7	Merritt (1–0)	**Ventura** (11–12)	—	24,741	81–79	L2

October: 0–2 (Home: 0–2; Away: 0–0)

#	Date	Opponent	Score	Win	Loss	Save	Attendance	Record	Streak
161	October 1	Indians	3–6	Clevinger (3–3)	**Strahm** (2–2)	Allen (31)	28,569	81–80	L3
162	October 2	Indians	2–3	Tomlin (13–9)	**Kennedy** (11–11)	Allen (32)	29,475	81–81	L4

Legend: = Win = Loss = Postponement
Bold = Royals team member

== Roster ==
2016 Kansas City Royals
Roster
Pitchers: 54 Scott Alexander; 17 Wade Davis; 41 Danny Duffy; 33 Brian Flynn; 53 Dillon Gee; 40 Kelvin Herrera; 44 Luke Hochevar; 31 Ian Kennedy; 61 Kevin McCarthy; 39 Kris Medlen; 63 Alec Mills; 47 Peter Moylan; 62 Brooks Pounders; 48 Joakim Soria; 64 Matt Strahm; 51 Jason Vargas; 30 Yordano Ventura; 36 Edinson Vólquez; 67 Chien-Ming Wang; 32 Chris Young	Catchers: 9 Drew Butera; 7 Tony Cruz; 13 Salvador Pérez; Infielders: 24 Christian Colón; 19 Cheslor Cuthbert; 2 Alcides Escobar; 35 Eric Hosmer; 14 Omar Infante; 15 Whit Merrifield; 27 Raúl A. Mondesí; 25 Kendrys Morales; 8 Mike Moustakas; 12 Daniel Nava	Outfielders: 14 Billy Burns; 6 Lorenzo Cain; 60 Hunter Dozier; 1 Jarrod Dyson; 12 Brett Eibner; 34 Reymond Fuentes; 4 Alex Gordon; 0 Terrance Gore; 16 Paulo Orlando	Manager: 3 Ned Yost; Coaches: 58 Dave Eiland (pitching); 28 Pedro Grifol (catching); 57 Doug Henry (bullpen); 23 Mike Jirschele (third base); 18 Rusty Kuntz (first base); 21 Dale Sveum (hitting); 22 Don Wakamatsu (bench); 88 Cody Clark (bullpen catcher)

== Player stats ==
=== Batting ===
Note: G = Games played; AB = At bats; R = Runs; H = Hits; 2B = Doubles; 3B = Triples; HR = Home runs; RBI = Runs batted in; SB = Stolen bases; BB = Walks; AVG = Batting average; SLG = Slugging average

Player	G	AB	R	H	2B	3B	HR	RBI	SB	BB	AVG	SLG
Alcides Escobar	162	637	57	166	24	6	7	55	17	27	.261	.350
Eric Hosmer	158	605	80	161	24	1	25	104	5	57	.266	.433
Kendrys Morales	154	558	65	147	24	0	30	93	0	48	.263	.468
Salvador Pérez	139	514	57	127	28	2	22	64	0	22	.247	.438
Cheslor Cuthbert	128	475	49	130	28	1	12	46	2	32	.274	.413
Paulo Orlando	128	457	52	138	24	4	5	43	14	13	.302	.405
Alex Gordon	128	445	62	98	16	2	17	40	8	52	.220	.380
Lorenzo Cain	103	397	56	114	19	1	9	56	14	31	.287	.408
Whit Merrifield	81	311	44	88	22	3	2	29	8	19	.283	.392
Jarrod Dyson	107	299	46	83	14	8	1	25	30	26	.278	.388
Christian Colón	54	147	13	34	6	0	1	13	0	11	.231	.293
Adalberto Mondesí	47	135	16	25	1	3	2	13	9	6	.185	.281
Omar Infante	39	134	16	32	9	1	0	11	0	9	.239	.321
Drew Butera	55	123	18	35	10	1	4	16	0	8	.285	.480
Mike Moustakas	27	104	12	25	6	0	7	13	0	9	.240	.500
Brett Eibner	26	78	11	18	6	0	3	10	0	6	.231	.423
Rey Fuentes	13	41	2	13	1	0	0	5	0	3	.317	.341
Billy Burns	24	37	7	9	0	0	0	1	3	0	.243	.243
Hunter Dozier	8	19	4	4	1	0	0	1	0	2	.211	.263
Daniel Nava	9	11	1	1	1	0	0	0	0	1	.091	.182
Tony Cruz	4	4	0	0	0	0	0	1	0	0	.000	.000
Terrance Gore	17	3	6	0	0	0	0	0	11	0	.000	.000
Pitcher totals	162	18	1	2	0	0	0	1	0	0	.111	.111
Team totals	162	5552	675	1450	264	33	147	640	121	382	.261	.400

=== Pitching ===
Note: W = Wins; L = Losses; ERA = Earned run average; G = Games pitched; GS = Games started; SV = Saves; IP = Innings pitched; H = Hits allowed; R = Runs allowed; ER = Earned runs allowed; BB = Walks allowed; SO = Strikeouts

Player	W	L	ERA	G	GS	SV	IP	H	R	ER	BB	SO
Ian Kennedy	11	11	3.68	33	33	0	195.2	173	81	80	66	184
Edinson Vólquez	10	11	5.37	34	34	0	189.1	217	124	113	76	139
Yordano Ventura	11	12	4.45	32	32	0	186.0	190	96	92	78	144
Danny Duffy	12	3	3.51	42	26	0	179.2	163	71	70	42	188
Dillon Gee	8	9	4.68	33	14	0	125.0	146	67	65	37	89
Chris Young	3	9	6.19	34	13	1	88.2	104	63	61	43	94
Kelvin Herrera	2	6	2.75	72	0	12	72.0	57	23	22	12	86
Joakim Soria	5	8	4.05	70	0	1	66.2	70	31	30	27	68
Brian Flynn	1	2	2.60	36	1	0	55.1	38	19	16	23	44
Chien-Ming Wang	6	0	4.22	38	0	0	53.1	60	27	25	18	30
Peter Moylan	2	0	3.43	50	0	0	44.2	42	19	17	16	34
Wade Davis	2	1	1.87	45	0	27	43.1	33	9	9	16	47
Luke Hochevar	2	3	3.86	40	0	0	37.1	31	17	16	9	40
Kris Medlen	1	3	7.77	6	6	0	24.1	30	25	21	20	18
Matt Strahm	2	2	1.23	21	0	0	22.0	13	4	3	11	30
Scott Alexander	0	0	3.32	17	0	0	19.0	24	7	7	7	16
Brooks Pounders	2	1	9.24	13	0	0	12.2	19	13	13	3	13
Jason Vargas	0	0	2.25	3	3	0	12.0	8	3	3	3	11
Kevin McCarthy	1	0	6.48	10	0	0	8.1	11	8	6	5	7
Alec Mills	0	0	13.50	3	0	0	3.1	3	5	5	5	4
Drew Butera	0	0	0.00	2	0	0	1.1	1	0	0	0	1
Team totals	81	81	4.21	162	162	41	1440.0	1433	712	674	517	1287

== Farm system ==
Level	Team	League	Manager
AAA	Omaha Storm Chasers	Pacific Coast League	Brian Poldberg
AA	Northwest Arkansas Naturals	Texas League	Vance Wilson
A-Advanced	Wilmington Blue Rocks	Carolina League	Jamie Quirk
A	Lexington Legends	South Atlantic League	Omar Ramírez
Rookie	Burlington Royals	Appalachian League	Scott Thorman
Rookie	Idaho Falls Chukars	Pioneer League	Justin Gemoll
Rookie	DSL Royals	Dominican Summer League	Darryl Kennedy
