= Michael Ynoa =

Dominican baseball player (born 1991)

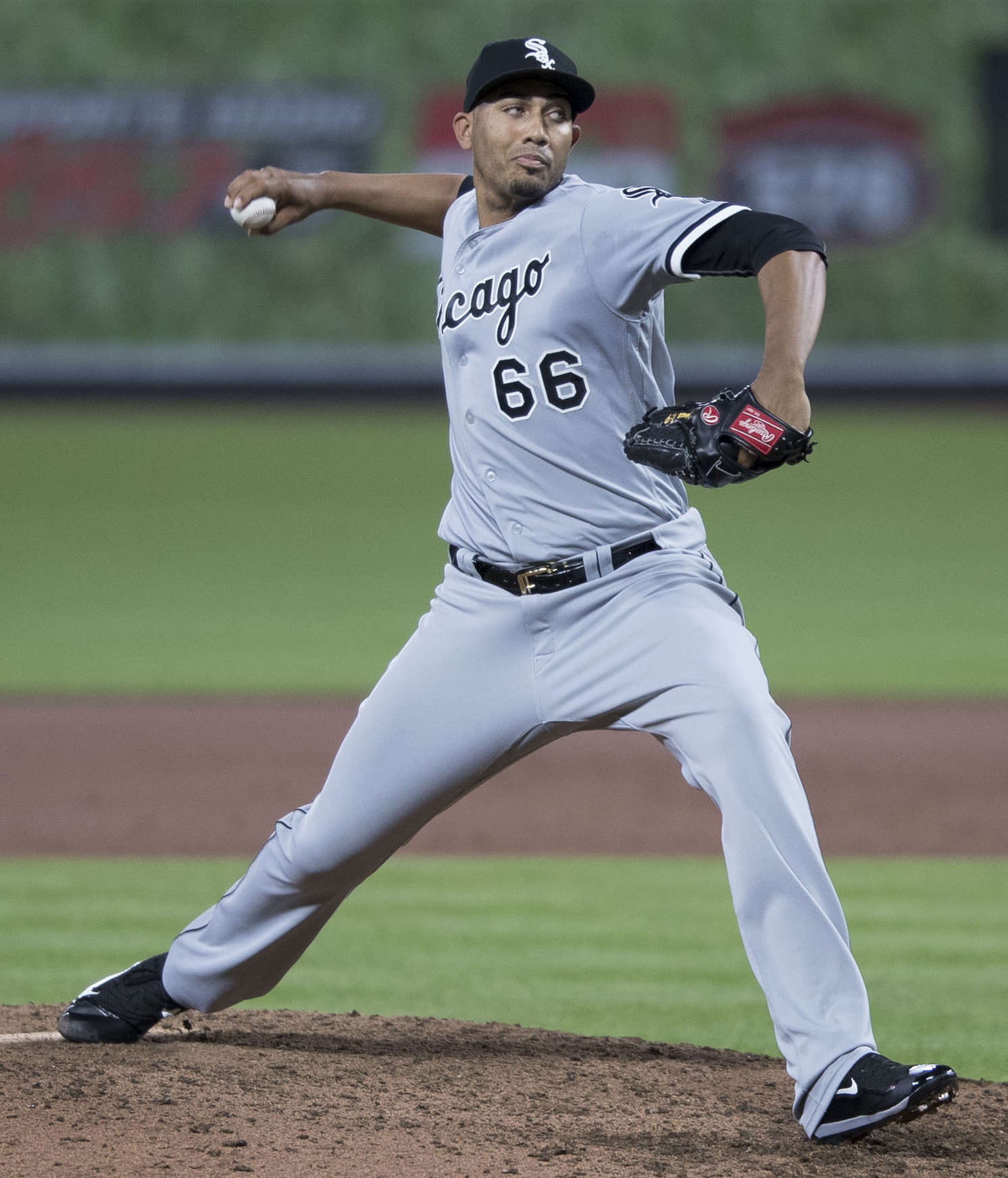
- Ynoa pitching for the Chicago White Sox in 2017
- Pitcher
- Born: September 24, 1991 (age 35); Puerto Plata, Dominican Republic
- Batted: Right Threw: Right

MLB debut
- June 14, 2016, for the Chicago White Sox

Last MLB appearance
- July 1, 2017, for the Chicago White Sox

MLB statistics
- Win–loss record: 2–0
- Earned run average: 4.42
- Strikeouts: 53
- Stats at Baseball Reference

Teams
- Chicago White Sox (2016–2017)

Michael Jose Ynoa Ventura (né Michel; born September 24, 1991) is a Dominican former professional baseball pitcher. He played in Major League Baseball (MLB) for the Chicago White Sox.

== Career ==
=== Oakland Athletics ===
Ynoa signed with the Oakland Athletics of Major League Baseball (MLB) for $4.25 million, setting a new record for the A's organization after lefty pitcher Mark Mulder was signed for $3.2 million in 1998. Ynoa was named the "Number One" and the "crown jewel" in the "Best Latino Prospects of 2008." Ynoa was said to be the most impressive Latin American player prospect since Félix Hernández in 2002. Two MLB teams (Cincinnati Reds, Texas Rangers) "reportedly offered Ynoa about $5 million." It was reported that Ynoa signed with Oakland after a deal fell through with the New York Yankees. The Yankees reportedly broke off talks with Ynoa after agent Adam Katz sought to renegotiate a handshake agreement with the club.

In August 2010, after pitching nine innings in the Arizona League, Ynoa underwent Tommy John surgery, causing him to miss the 2011 campaign. He returned to action in 2012 with the rookie-level Arizona League Athletics and Low-A Vermont Lake Monsters. In 14 appearances (12 starts) for the two affiliates, Ynoa struggled to a 1–4 record and 6.46 ERA with 25 strikeouts across 30 2/3 innings pitched. Ynoa's contract was selected by the Athletics on November 20, 2012, and he was added to the 40-man roster.

Ynoa split the 2013 campaign between the Single-A Beloit Snappers and High-A Stockton Ports. In 22 appearances (21 starts) for the two affiliates, he posted a combined 3–3 record and 3.69 ERA with 68 strikeouts and one save across 75 2/3 innings pitched. Ynoa returned to Stockton for the 2014 season, compiling a 4–2 record and 5.52 ERA with 64 strikeouts in 45 2/3 innings pitched across 31 games.

=== Chicago White Sox ===
On December 9, 2014, the Athletics traded Ynoa and Jeff Samardzija to the Chicago White Sox in exchange for Marcus Semien, Chris Bassitt, Rangel Ravelo, and Josh Phegley. He made 28 appearances for the High-A Winston-Salem Dash in 2015, registering an 0–2 record and 2.61 ERA with 40 strikeouts and six saves over 38 innings of work.

Ynoa began the 2016 season with the Double-A Birmingham Barons, and was promoted to the Triple-A Charlotte Knights after three scoreless appearances. In 18 appearances for Charlotte, Ynoa logged a 1–3 record and 4.56 ERA with 20 strikeouts and four saves.

On June 14, 2016, the White Sox promoted Ynoa to the major leagues for the first time. In 45 games over the 2016–2017 seasons, Ynoa compiled a 2–0 record, with a 4.42 ERA in 59 innings. He was released on March 15, 2018.

=== Kansas City Royals ===
On November 13, 2018, Ynoa signed a minor league contract with the Kansas City Royals. He was assigned to the Triple–A Omaha Storm Chasers to start the 2019 season, for whom he posted a 1–1 record and 4.57 ERA with 26 strikeouts and two saves across 21 2/3 innings pitched. Ynoa was released by the Royals organization on May 29, 2019.

=== Oakland Athletics (second stint) ===
On February 12, 2020, Ynoa signed a minor league contract with the Oakland Athletics organization. He did not play in a game in 2020 due to the cancellation of the minor league season because of the COVID-19 pandemic. Ynoa became a free agent on November 2.

=== Acereros de Monclova ===
On December 29, 2020, Ynoa signed a minor league contract with the Philadelphia Phillies organization. Prior to the start of the season on March 27, 2021, Ynoa was released by the Phillies.

On April 20, 2022, Ynoa signed with the Acereros de Monclova of the Mexican League. In 12 appearances out of the bullpen, Ynoa posted a 1–0 record with a 3.60 ERA over 10 innings pitched. He was released by the team on May 24.

=== Mariachis de Guadalajara ===
On May 25, 2022, Ynoa signed with the Mariachis de Guadalajara of the Mexican League. In 13 games for Guadalajara, he logged a 1–2 record and 2.57 ERA with 17 strikeouts across 14 innings pitched. Ynoa was released by the Mariachis on July 9.

== Spelling of name ==
"Michel Ynoa" is the original spelling of Ynoa's name. His first name was anglicized from "Michel" to "Michael" after he signed as an amateur with the Oakland Athletics in July 2008. Early in his career, Ynoa's last name was mistakenly spelled "Inoa." He and the Athletics corrected the error in February 2009. His surname reverted to the original spelling, although he maintained the anglicized forename.

== Personal life ==
Ynoa's younger brother, Huascar, is also a professional baseball pitcher.
