= Dillon Overton =

American baseball player (born 1991)

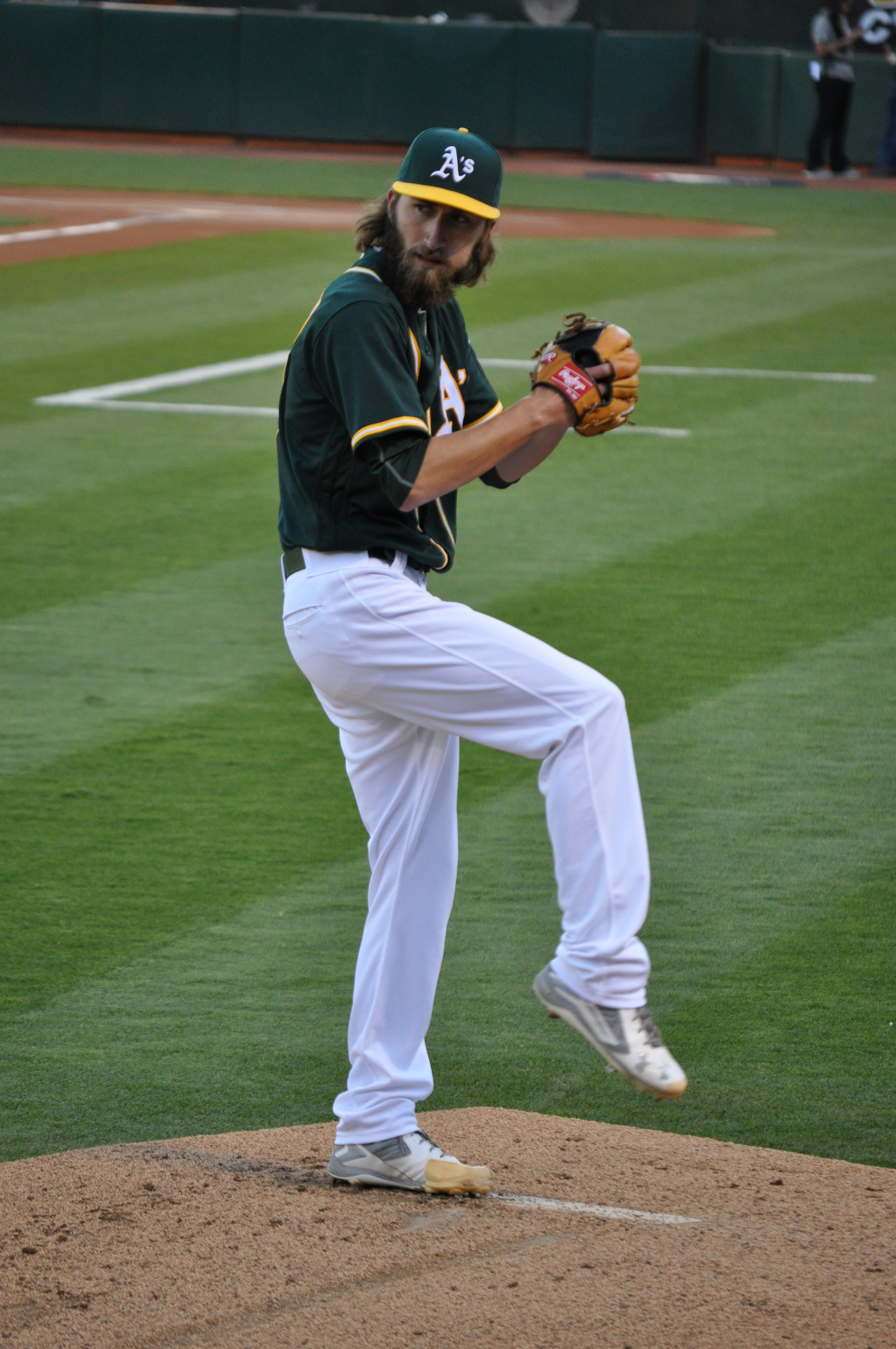
- Overton with the Oakland Athletics
- Pitcher
- Born: August 17, 1991 (age 34); Clinton, Oklahoma, U.S.
- Batted: Left Threw: Left

Professional debut
- MLB: June 25, 2016, for the Oakland Athletics
- CPBL: March 16, 2021, for the Rakuten Monkeys

Last appearance
- MLB: July 1, 2017, for the San Diego Padres
- CPBL: September 24, 2021, for the Rakuten Monkeys

MLB statistics
- Win–loss record: 1–4
- Earned run average: 9.13
- Strikeouts: 28

CPBL statistics
- Win–loss record: 8–2
- Earned run average: 3.75
- Strikeouts: 55
- Stats at Baseball Reference

Teams
- Oakland Athletics (2016); Seattle Mariners (2017); San Diego Padres (2017); Rakuten Monkeys (2021)

Dillon Ray Overton (born August 17, 1991) is an American former professional baseball pitcher. He played in Major League Baseball (MLB) for the Oakland Athletics, Seattle Mariners, and San Diego Padres and in the Chinese Professional Baseball League (CPBL) for the Rakuten Monkeys.

== Amateur career ==
Overton was drafted by the Boston Red Sox in the 26th round of the 2010 Major League Baseball draft out of Weatherford High School in Weatherford, Oklahoma. He did not sign with the Red Sox and played college baseball at the University of Oklahoma for the Sooners from 2011 to 2013.

== Professional career ==
=== Oakland Athletics ===
Overton was then drafted by the Oakland Athletics in the second round of the 2013 Major League Baseball draft. After signing, Overton underwent Tommy John surgery, a development which significantly lowered his signing bonus. He returned in 2014 and made his professional debut with the Arizona League Athletics. He was later promoted to the Vermont Lake Monsters, where he finished the season. Unfortunately, the surgery did affect his fastball velocity, which dropped from mid-90s to high-80s. Overton split the 2015 season with the High–A Stockton Ports and the Double-A Midland RockHounds.

Overton began the 2016 season with an 8–4 record and 3.01 earned run average with the Triple-A Nashville Sounds, before being promoted to the Athletics to make his major league debut on June 25, becoming the 11th Athletic to make a start during 2016. Overton made 5 starts with Oakland in 2016, going 1–3 with an 11.47 ERA, giving up 12 home runs in 24 1/3 innings pitched. Following the signing of infielder Adam Rosales, Overton was designated for assignment on January 25, 2017.

=== Seattle Mariners ===
On January 26, 2017, Overton was traded to the Seattle Mariners in exchange for minor-leaguer Jason Goldstein, adding to Seattle's starting pitching depth. Overton pitched to a 6.31 ERA for Seattle and was designated for assignment.

=== San Diego Padres ===
On June 19, 2017, Overton was claimed off waivers by the San Diego Padres. He made one start for the Padres before he was removed from the 40–man roster and sent outright to the Triple–A El Paso Chihuahuas on August 31. In 2018, Overton played for the rookie–level Arizona League Padres, Double–A San Antonio Missions, and El Paso. In 25 games (14 starts) for the three affiliates, he compiled an 8–2 record and 2.90 ERA with 72 strikeouts over 99 1/3 innings pitched.

Overton made 25 appearances (22 starts) for El Paso in 2019, registering a 10–5 record and 5.46 ERA with 103 strikeouts across 115 1/3 innings pitched. He elected free agency following the season on November 4, 2019.

=== Arizona Diamondbacks ===
On March 11, 2020, Overton signed a minor league contract with the Arizona Diamondbacks. He did not play in a game in 2020 due to the cancellation of the minor league season because of the COVID-19 pandemic. Overton was released by the Diamondbacks organization on May 22.

=== Rakuten Monkeys ===
On December 21, 2020, the Rakuten Monkeys of the Chinese Professional Baseball League signed Overton for the 2021 season. On March 16, 2021, Overton made his CPBL debut. In 17 games (9 starts) for the Monkeys, he compiled an 8–2 record and 3.75 ERA with 55 strikeouts over 57 2/3 innings pitched. Overton was released by Rakuten on September 25.

=== Colorado Rockies ===
On February 18, 2022, Overton signed a minor league contract with the Colorado Rockies. In 12 games (11 starts) for the Triple–A Albuquerque Isotopes, he struggled to a 2–7 record and 8.60 ERA with 39 strikeouts in 45.0 innings of work. On July 8, Overton retired from professional baseball.

== Personal life ==
Overton and his wife, Morgan, have one son named Oliver Ray who was born in April 2017.
