= Jason Coats =

American baseball player (born 1990)

- Outfielder
- Born: February 24, 1990 (age 36); Dallas, Texas, U.S.
- Batted: Right Threw: Right

MLB debut
- June 4, 2016, for the Chicago White Sox

Last MLB appearance
- September 29, 2016, for the Chicago White Sox

MLB statistics
- Batting average: .200
- Home runs: 1
- Runs batted in: 4
- Stats at Baseball Reference

Teams
- Chicago White Sox (2016)

Jason Leavell Coats (born February 24, 1990) is an American former professional baseball outfielder. He played in Major League Baseball (MLB) for the Chicago White Sox.

== Career ==
=== Amateur ===
Coats played college baseball at Texas Christian University (TCU) for the TCU Horned Frogs. In 2010, he played collegiate summer baseball with the Bourne Braves of the Cape Cod Baseball League. After his junior year, he was drafted by the Baltimore Orioles in the 12th round of the 2011 Major League Baseball draft, but did not sign and returned to TCU for his senior year. His senior year came to an end after tearing his ACL during the final game of the regular season.

=== Chicago White Sox ===
Coats was drafted by the Chicago White Sox in the 29th round of the 2012 MLB draft. He made his professional debut in 2013 with the Kannapolis Intimidators. Coats played 2014 with the Winston-Salem Dash and Birmingham Barons, 2015 with Birmingham and the Charlotte Knights, and started 2016 with Charlotte.

The White Sox promoted Coats to the major leagues on June 4, and put him in their starting lineup.

=== Tampa Bay Rays ===
Coats was claimed off waivers by the Tampa Bay Rays on January 11, 2017. Later that day, Coats tore his right ulnar collateral ligament. He was released on January 30. On March 13, Coats re–signed with the Rays on a minor league contract, but missed the entirety of the 2017 season as a result of his UCL injury.

Coats played in 108 games for the Triple-A Durham Bulls in 2018, batting .247/.293/.448 with 15 home runs and 60 RBI. He elected free agency following the season on November 2, 2018.

Coats later re-signed with the Rays on another minor league deal on February 6, 2019, that included an invitation to spring training. He was assigned to the Triple–A Durham Bulls to start the 2019 season. In 92 games for Durham, he slashed .250/.293/.461 with 18 home runs, 50 RBI, and six stolen bases. Coast elected free agency following the season on November 7.
