= Matt Purke =

American baseball player (born 1990)

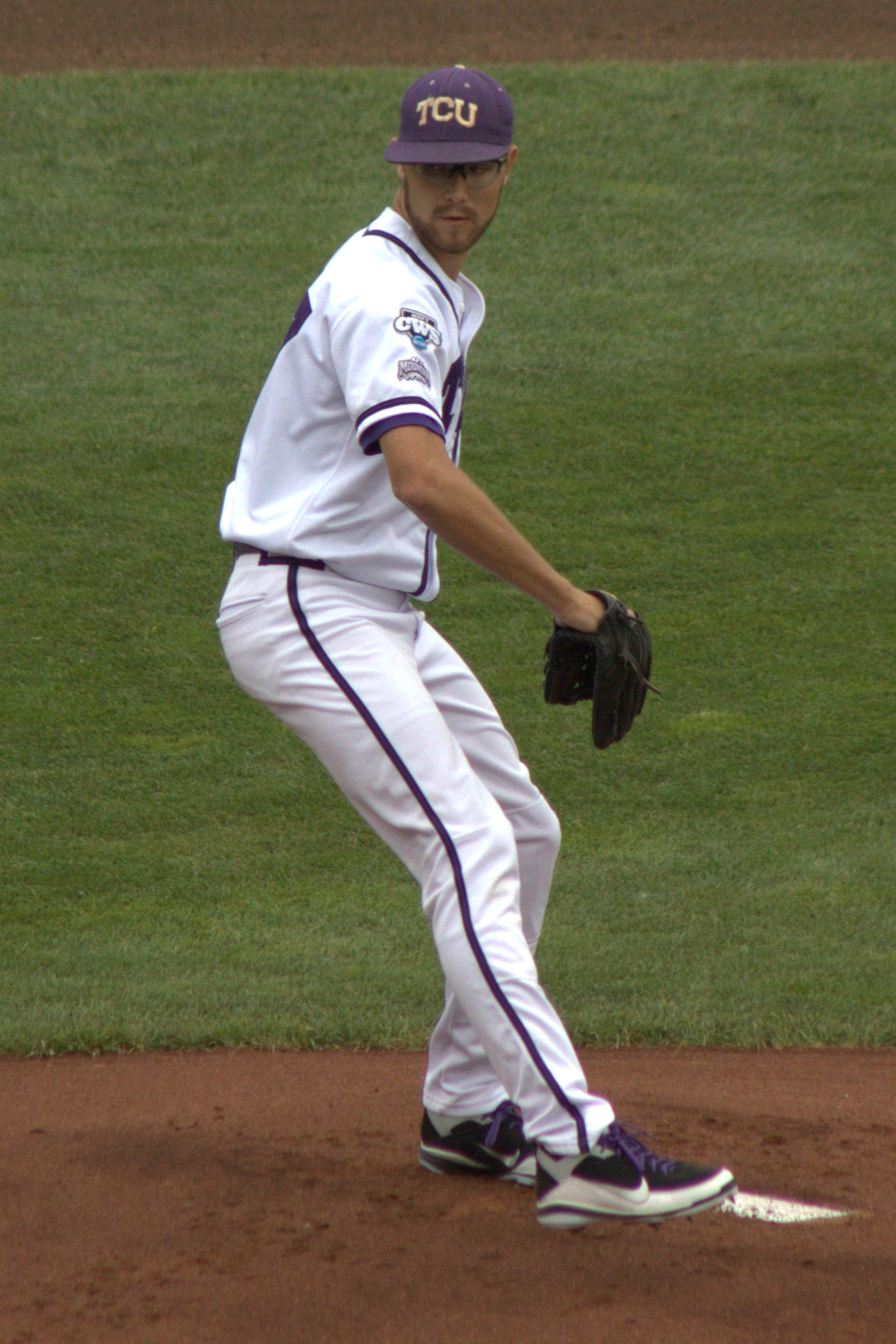
- Purke pitching for TCU
- Pitcher
- Born: July 17, 1990 (age 36); Spring, Texas, U.S.
- Batted: Left Threw: Left

MLB debut
- May 20, 2016, for the Chicago White Sox

Last MLB appearance
- June 29, 2016, for the Chicago White Sox

MLB statistics
- Win–loss record: 0–1
- Earned run average: 5.50
- Strikeouts: 15
- Stats at Baseball Reference

Teams
- Chicago White Sox (2016)
Medals
Men's baseball
Representing United States
World Junior Baseball Championship
Silver medal – second place	2008 Edmonton	Team

Matthew Taylor Purke (born July 17, 1990) is an American former professional baseball pitcher. He made his Major League Baseball (MLB) debut and played his only MLB season with the Chicago White Sox in 2016.

== Amateur career ==
Purke attended Klein High School in Klein, Texas. He was considered one of the best high school pitchers in baseball. His junior year was his best as he had a 12–1 win–loss record with a 0.37 earned run average (ERA). In his senior season he went 4–2 with a 1.18 ERA. He also carried a 4.5 GPA. He came out as a flamethrower throwing an average of 92 miles per hour (148 km/h). In 2009, ESPN projected that he would be the next Johan Santana.

The Texas Rangers selected Purke in the first round, with the 14th overall selection, of the 2009 Major League Baseball draft. He did not sign, and instead enrolled at Texas Christian University (TCU), where he played college baseball for the TCU Horned Frogs. While there, he earned 2nd Team All American as a Freshman, and was named the Freshman of the year while going 16–0 with a 3.02 ERA. His sophomore year he went 5–1 with a 1.71 ERA in 11 starts.

== Professional career ==
=== Washington Nationals ===
Purke was drafted by the Washington Nationals in the third round of the 2011 Major League Baseball draft. He signed with the Nationals on August 15, 2011. Purke was added to the 40-man roster in 2012 and made 3 starts for the Single-A Hagerstown Suns. He then had shoulder debridement surgery and missed the remainder of the 2012 season. He returned with Hagerstown in 2013, and posted a 6-4 record and 3.80 ERA in 18 games between the High-A Potomac Nationals and Hagerstown.

Pitching for the Double-A Harrisburg Senators of the Eastern League in 2014, Purke struggled with a 1–6 record and an 8.04 ERA. Purke later underwent Tommy John surgery. On November 13, 2014, the Nationals released Purke, and re-signed him to a minor league contract with an invitation to spring training on November 18. He split the 2015 season between Harrisburg, Potomac, and Hagerstown, accumulating a 3-6 record and 4.36 ERA with 43 strikeouts in 64.0 innings of work between the three teams. On November 6, 2015, he elected free agency.

=== Chicago White Sox ===
On November 21, 2015, Purke signed a minor league contract with the Chicago White Sox organization that included an invitation to Spring Training. He was assigned to the Triple-A Charlotte Knights to begin the 2016 season.

The White Sox promoted Purke to the major leagues for the first time on May 13, 2016. He made his MLB debut on May 20, pitching an inning and a third of scoreless ball against the Kansas City Royals. He finished his rookie season with a 5.50 ERA in 12 major league games with Chicago. On December 14, 2016, Purke was designated for assignment by the White Sox, and was outrighted to the minors on December 21. Purke spent the 2017 season in Triple-A with Charlotte, and posted a 4-5 record and 3.84 ERA in 48 appearances with the team. He elected free agency following the season on November 6, 2017.

=== New York Mets ===
On November 17, 2017, Purke signed a minor league contract with the New York Mets organization. Purke spent the year with the Triple-A Las Vegas 51s, recording a 2-2 record and 7.14 ERA with 42 strikeouts in 46.2 innings of work. On November 2, 2018, he elected free agency.

=== Sugar Land Skeeters ===
On May 10, 2019, Purke signed with the Sugar Land Skeeters of the Atlantic League of Professional Baseball. He was released on August 16. He re-signed with the Skeeters on August 19, and finished the year with a 5-8 record and 5.62 ERA in 31 appearances. Purke became a free agent following the season.

=== High Point Rockers ===
On March 10, 2020, Purke signed with the High Point Rockers of the Atlantic League of Professional Baseball. On May 4, Purke was released by the team without playing in a game, as the season was cancelled due to the COVID-19 pandemic.

== Coaching career ==
On August 11, 2020, Purke announced his retirement of professional baseball and returned to his alma mater, Texas Christian University, to serve as a student assistant on the coaching staff as he completed his undergraduate degree.
