= Chris Beck (baseball) =

American baseball pitcher (born 1990)

- Pitcher
- Born: September 4, 1990 (age 36); Commerce, Georgia, U.S.
- Batted: Right Threw: Right

MLB debut
- May 28, 2015, for the Chicago White Sox

Last MLB appearance
- July 8, 2018, for the New York Mets

MLB statistics
- Win–loss record: 4–4
- Earned run average: 5.88
- Strikeouts: 86
- Stats at Baseball Reference

Teams
- Chicago White Sox (2015–2018); New York Mets (2018)

Christopher Michael Beck (born September 4, 1990) is an American former professional baseball pitcher who played in Major League Baseball (MLB) for the Chicago White Sox and New York Mets.

== Career ==
=== Amateur ===
Beck was originally drafted out of high school in the 35th round of the 2009 MLB draft by the Cleveland Indians but chose instead to play college baseball for the Georgia Southern Eagles. At Georgia Southern, Beck was named the most outstanding player of the 2011 Southern Conference baseball tournament. After the 2011 season, he played collegiate summer baseball with the Cotuit Kettleers of the Cape Cod Baseball League and was named a league all-star. He was drafted by the Chicago White Sox in the 2nd round of the 2012 MLB draft.

=== Chicago White Sox ===
Beck started his career with the rookie level Great Falls Voyagers in 2012. He finished the 2012 season with a record of 4–3 in 15 games (6 starts), 40 1/3 innings, 4.69 ERA, 51 hits, 12 walks and 36 strikeouts. For the 2013 season, Beck was ranked as the White Sox #12 prospect. Beck started the 2013 season with High-A Winston-Salem Dash but was promoted to Double-A Birmingham Barons late in the season. Beck finished the 2013 season with a combined record of 13–10 in 26 games (26 starts), 146 2/3 innings, 3.07 ERA, 143 hits, 45 walks and 79 strikeouts.

Beck made his MLB debut on May 28, 2015, as a one-day call-up for a doubleheader against the Baltimore Orioles. He would spend the remainder of the year in the minor leagues, and began the 2016 season with Triple-A Charlotte. On June 21, 2016, the White Sox called up Beck from the minors. In his first appearance of the season, Beck pitched one inning, giving up one hit and one earned run, two walks and one strikeout for a 9.00 ERA. He made 25 total appearances for Chicago during the regular season, logging a 2-2 record and 6.39 ERA with 20 strikeouts across 25 1/3 innings pitched.

Beck made 57 appearances out of the bullpen for the White Sox during the 2017 campaign, registering a 2-1 record and 6.40 ERA with 42 strikeouts across 64 2/3 innings pitched. He made 14 outings for Chicago in 2018, recording a 4.18 ERA with 16 strikeouts and one save over 23 2/3 innings of work. Beck was designated for assignment by the White Sox on June 9, 2018.

=== New York Mets ===
On June 13, 2018, Beck was claimed off waivers by the New York Mets. In six appearances for the Mets, he compiled a 5.23 ERA with five strikeouts across 10 1/3 innings pitched. Beck was designated for assignment by New York on July 9, 2018. He cleared waivers and was sent outright to the Triple-A Las Vegas 51s on July 13. On October 2, Beck elected to become a free agent.

=== St. Louis Cardinals ===
On November 29, 2018, Beck signed a minor league contract with the St. Louis Cardinals. He made 37 appearances for the Triple-A Memphis Redbirds in 2019, but struggled to an 0-7 record and 6.10 ERA with 39 strikeouts and six saves across 41 1/3 innings of work. Beck was released by the Cardinals organization on July 27, 2019.

=== Somerset Patriots ===
On August 13, 2019, Beck signed with the Somerset Patriots of the Atlantic League of Professional Baseball. In 6 appearances for Somerset, he struggled to a 7.94 ERA with 6 strikeouts and 2 saves across 5 2/3 innings of relief. On August 29, Beck was placed on the ineligible list and left the organization to pursue other opportunities.
