= Nate Jones (baseball) =

American baseball player (born 1986)

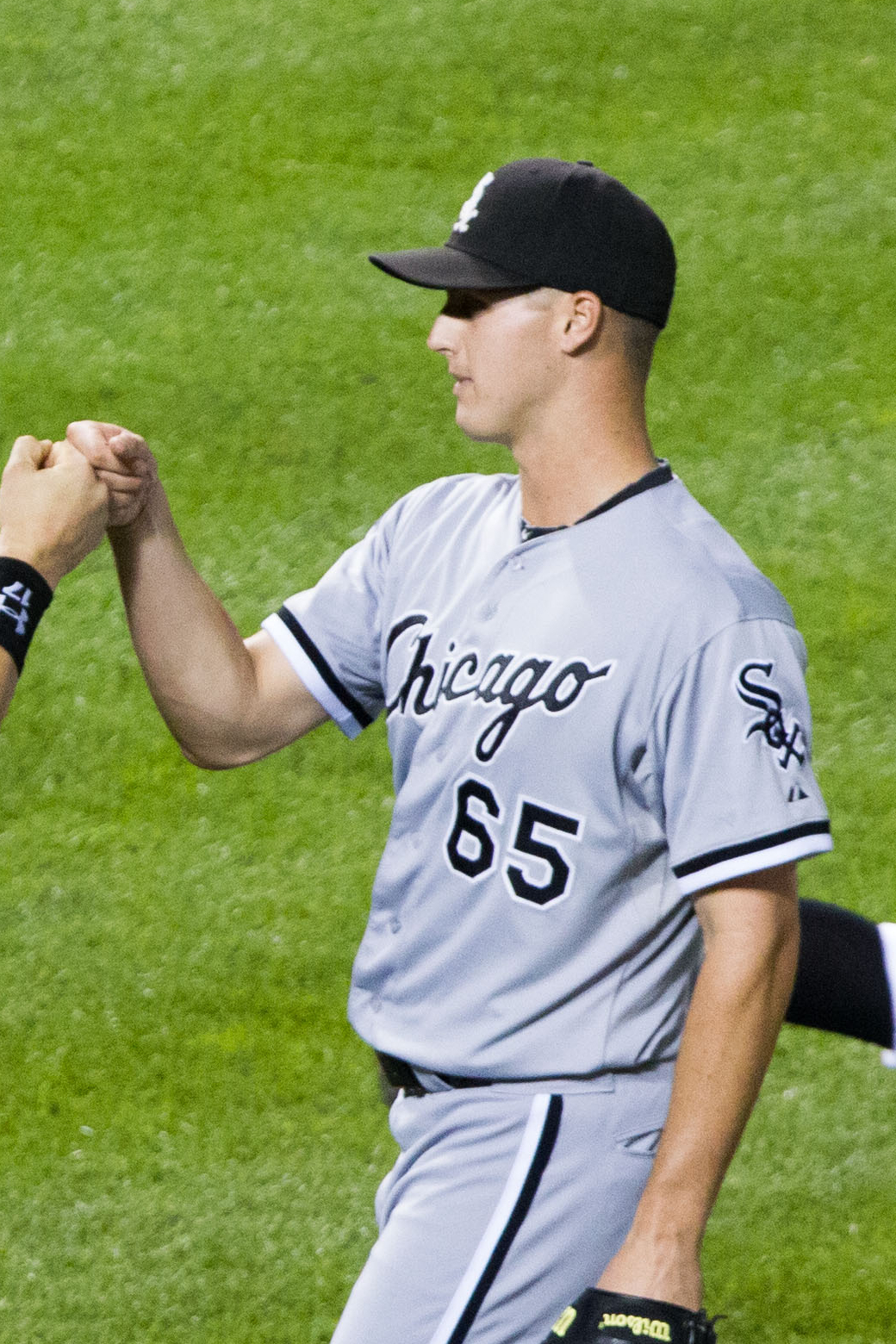
- Jones with the Chicago White Sox
- Pitcher
- Born: January 28, 1986 (age 39); Butler, Kentucky, U.S.
- Batted: Right Threw: Right

MLB debut
- April 8, 2012, for the Chicago White Sox

Last MLB appearance
- June 12, 2021, for the Los Angeles Dodgers

MLB statistics
- Win–loss record: 22–16
- Earned run average: 3.45
- Strikeouts: 355
- Stats at Baseball Reference

Teams
- Chicago White Sox (2012–2019); Cincinnati Reds (2020); Atlanta Braves (2021); Los Angeles Dodgers (2021)
Medals
Men's baseball
Representing United States
World Baseball Classic
Gold medal – first place	2017 Los Angeles	Team

Nathan Andrew Jones (born January 28, 1986) is an American former professional baseball pitcher. He played in Major League Baseball (MLB) for the Chicago White Sox, Cincinnati Reds, Atlanta Braves, and Los Angeles Dodgers.

== Baseball career ==
Jones attended Pendleton County High School in Falmouth, Kentucky. He was undrafted out of high school, and moved on to Northern Kentucky University and played college baseball for the Northern Kentucky Norse.

=== Chicago White Sox ===
The Chicago White Sox selected Jones in the fifth round, 179th overall, in the 2007 MLB draft.

Jones was assigned to the Rookie-level Bristol White Sox, where he went 0–4 in 10 starts with a 5.13 ERA. Despite his slow start, Jones started 2008 with the Single-A Kannapolis Intimidators, but was demoted back to Bristol. He played 4 games with Bristol before being promoted back to Kannapolis. He was promoted to the High-A Winston-Salem Dash, then the Warthogs, where he played his last 2 games of the 2008 season. In total that year, Jones went 2–7 with a 6.14 ERA. He started 2009 with Kannapolis, where he had a 2.41 ERA in 13 games before being promoted to Winston-Salem, now the Dash, where he had a 3.65 ERA in 32 games. His biggest season to date was the 2010 season. He played it with Winston-Salem, going 11–6 with a 4.08 ERA. He led the league in starts (28), innings pitched (152.1) and winning percentage (.647). He was invited to spring training with the White Sox, where he played 3 games and had a 2.25 ERA and a win. He was placed on the 40-man roster for the season to be protected from the Rule V Draft. He played 2011 with the Double-A Birmingham Barons, where he had a 3.27 ERA and 12 saves.

In 2012, Jones made the White Sox 25-man roster out of spring training. Jones made his MLB debut on April 8, 2012, against the Texas Rangers pitching one inning, walking two and striking out one. Jones got his first career win on May 5, against the Detroit Tigers pitching one inning yielding one hit during a 3–2 White Sox victory. He finished the year 8–0, with a 2.39 ERA in 65 games.

In 2013, Jones went 4–5, recording a 4.15 ERA in 70 appearances. Jones lost much of the 2014 season to injury, undergoing back surgery on May 5 and Tommy John surgery on July 29.

Jones started the 2015 season on the 60-day disabled list in an effort to continue recovery from both surgeries. Jones was reinstated from the 60-day disabled list on August 5, 2015. He appeared in 19 games over the final two months of the season and posted an ERA of 3.32, striking out 27 batters in 19 innings.

In 2016, Jones pitched in 71 games, going 5–3 with a 2.29 ERA in 70 2/3 innings. He saved three games, but tied for the major league lead in blown saves, with nine. The following season, he appeared in only 11 games due to injury. In 2018, Jones pitched in 33 games, finishing with an ERA of 3.00 in 30 innings. He was placed on the disabled list on April 28, 2019, with inflammation to his right shoulder. On May 13, 2019, Jones underwent surgery to repair a torn right flexer mass, ending his season.

=== Texas Rangers ===
On July 31, 2019, Jones was traded to the Texas Rangers (along with international bonus allotments and cash considerations) in exchange for minor leaguers Joe Jarneski and Ray Castro. He became a free agent on November 1, 2019.

=== Cincinnati Reds ===
On January 14, 2020, Jones signed a minor league deal with the Cincinnati Reds. On July 18, 2020, Jones made the major league roster. On September 22, 2020, Jones was designated for assignment by the Reds. Jones was released by the organization on September 25.

In 2020 he was 0–1 with a 6.27 ERA. He gave up the highest percentage of hard hit balls of all major league pitchers, at 56.4%.

=== Atlanta Braves ===
On February 9, 2021, Jones signed a minor league contract with the Atlanta Braves organization that included an invitation to Spring Training. On March 27, 2021, Jones was selected to the 40-man roster. On May 3, 2021, Jones was optioned to the team's alternate training site. Jones was designated for assignment on May 7, after he had allowed 6 runs in 10.1 innings but exhibited a lack of control in his outings. On May 10, Jones was released by the Braves.

=== Los Angeles Dodgers ===
On May 14, 2021, Jones signed a minor league contract with the Los Angeles Dodgers organization. On May 21, Jones was added to the major league roster. He allowed eight earned runs in 8 2/3 innings over eight appearances for the Dodgers before he was designated for assignment on June 16, 2021. He was outrighted to the Triple-A Oklahoma City Dodgers on June 19. On June 20, he rejected the outright assignment and elected free agency.

On August 19, 2021, Jones announced his retirement from professional baseball.

== Pitching style ==
Jones is a hard thrower with four pitches in his repertoire. His main pitch is a two-seam fastball at 96–99. He also throws a slider and changeup (84–88), and a rare curveball. He uses his fastball early in the count to set up the slider, his main two-strike off-speed pitch, later in the count.

== Personal life ==
Jones and his wife, Lacy, have three children. The family resides in Falmouth during the off season.
