= 2016 Toronto Blue Jays season =

2016 Toronto Blue Jays
- American League Wild Card winners
- League: American League
- Division: East
- Ballpark: Rogers Centre
- City: Toronto, Ontario
- Record: 89–73 (.549)
- Divisional place: 2nd
- Owners: Rogers, CEO Mark Shapiro
- General managers: Ross Atkins
- Managers: John Gibbons
- Television: Sportsnet; Sportsnet One (Buck Martinez, Pat Tabler, Dan Shulman, Matt Devlin)
- Radio: Blue Jays Radio Network; Sportsnet 590 the FAN (Jerry Howarth, Joe Siddall, Mike Wilner, Duane Ward)

The 2016 Toronto Blue Jays season was the 40th season of the franchise in Major League Baseball, and the 27th full season of play (28th overall) at Rogers Centre. They advanced to the playoffs where they defeated the Baltimore Orioles in the ALWC Game and for the second year in a row, besting the Texas Rangers in the ALDS, reaching the ALCS, before losing in five games to the Cleveland Indians.

== Off–season ==
General manager Alex Anthopoulos rejected a five-year contract extension on October 29, 2015, and team president Paul Beeston retired on October 31. New Blue Jays president and CEO Mark Shapiro, who assumed the roles on November 2, 2015, announced that Tony LaCava was assigned as the interim general manager and that John Gibbons would remain as the manager. On November 6, 2015, a $15.8 million qualifying offer was extended to Marco Estrada. David Price was not eligible for a qualifying offer, as he was acquired mid-season. Estrada signed a two-year, $26 million contract on November 13.

On November 20, the Blue Jays signed Humberto Quintero to a minor league contract, and acquired Jesse Chavez from the Oakland Athletics for Liam Hendriks. 3 days later, the team signed Casey Kotchman, Jiovanni Mier, and David Adams to minor league contracts that included invitations to spring training. On November 24, Scott Diamond was signed to a minor league contract and invited to spring training. J. A. Happ, who was traded by the Blue Jays to the Seattle Mariners for Michael Saunders before the 2015 season, was signed to a three-year, $36 million contract on November 27. David Price agreed to a seven-year, $217 million contract with the Boston Red Sox on December 1. Justin Smoak, who was eligible for salary arbitration, was signed to a one-year, $3.9 million contract on December 2. Third baseman Josh Donaldson, outfielders Ben Revere and Michael Saunders, and pitchers Jesse Chavez, Drew Hutchison, Steve Delabar, Brett Cecil, and Aaron Loup were also tendered contracts. Catcher Josh Thole was not tendered a contract by the December 2 deadline, and became a free agent. On December 3, Ross Atkins was named the new general manager replacing LaCava. Thole signed a one-year, $800,000 contract with the Blue Jays on December 4.

Mark Lowe signed a two-year contract with the Detroit Tigers on December 8, for $11 million. In the Rule 5 draft on December 10, the Blue Jays selected pitcher Joe Biagini from the San Francisco Giants organization. Darwin Barney officially re-signed with the team on December 11. Wade LeBlanc was signed to a minor league contract on December 17. On December 18, Junior Lake was claimed off waivers, and signed Scott Copeland, Roberto Hernández, Pat McCoy, and Brad Penny to minor league contracts with invitations to spring training. Brandon Bixler and Gabe Noyalis were signed to minor-league contracts on December 29. On January 5, 2016, Arnold León was acquired from the Oakland Athletics for cash or a player to be named later. Three days later, outfielder Ben Revere and a player to be named later were traded to the Washington Nationals for reliever Drew Storen.

On January 12, pitchers Brett Cecil, Jesse Chavez, Steve Delabar, Drew Hutchison, Aaron Loup, and Drew Storen filed for salary arbitration, along with position players Josh Donaldson and Michael Saunders. Cecil, Delabar, Loup, Hutchison, and Storen agreed to a one-year contracts worth $3.8 million, $835,000, $1.05 million, $2.2 million, and $8.375 million respectively on January 15. Saunders agreed to a $2.9 million contract. Chavez and Donaldson did not come to an agreement before the deadline. Chavez had requested $4 million, while the Blue Jays offered $3.6 million. Donaldson filed for $11.8 million, and the Blue Jays offered $11.35 million. On January 18, Daniel Schlereth was signed to a minor league contract. Maicer Izturis, who was under contract with the Blue Jays for the 2015 season but did not play for the team due to various injuries, was signed to a minor league contract on January 29. On February 2, outfielder Darrell Ceciliani was acquired from the New York Mets for a player to be named later. David Aardsma was added to the list of non-roster invitees on February 5.

On February 6, it was announced that Chavez had won his arbitration case, and would receive a $4 million salary for the season. In addition, Gavin Floyd signed a one-year, $1 million contract with the Blue Jays, and Chad Jenkins was designated for assignment. On February 10, Donaldson avoided arbitration by signing a two-year, $28.65 million extension that would pay him $11.65 million in 2016, and $17 million in 2017. Colt Hynes, who spent most of the 2015 season with the Buffalo Bisons, was signed to a minor league contract on February 12. Three days before pitchers and catchers were scheduled to report to Dunedin, catcher Tony Sanchez was signed to a minor league contract with an invitation to spring training. Outfielder Domonic Brown and reliever Rafael Soriano were also added to the organization, each receiving a minor league contract and an invitation to spring training in late February.

At Rogers Centre, a full dirt infield was installed prior to the home opener; for the previous six seasons (2010–15), it was the only MLB ballpark with sliding pits.

=== Trades ===
Date	Team in transaction	Player(s) acquired	Player(s) departed	Ref.
November 20, 2015	Oakland Athletics	Jesse Chavez	Liam Hendriks	
January 5, 2016	Oakland Athletics	Arnold León	Cash considerations or a player to be named later	
January 8, 2016	Washington Nationals	Drew Storen	Ben Revere; Player to be named later	
February 2, 2016	New York Mets	Darrell Ceciliani	Player to be named later	

=== Free agency ===
==== In ====
Date	Player	Former team	Details	Ref.
November 9, 2015	Bobby Korecky	—N/a	Minor league contract	
November 13, 2015	Marco Estrada	—N/a	Two-year, $26 million contract	
November 20, 2015	Humberto Quintero	Boston Red Sox	Minor league contract with an invitation to spring training	
November 23, 2015	Casey Kotchman	Kansas City Royals	Minor league contract with an invitation to spring training	
November 23, 2015	Jiovanni Mier	Houston Astros	Minor league contract with an invitation to spring training	
November 23, 2015	David Adams	Miami Marlins	Minor league contract with an invitation to spring training	
November 24, 2015	Scott Diamond	Tampa Bay Rays	Minor league contract with an invitation to spring training	
November 27, 2015	J. A. Happ	Pittsburgh Pirates	Three-year, $36 million contract	
December 4, 2015	Josh Thole	—N/a	One-year, $800,000 contract	
December 11, 2015	Darwin Barney	—N/a	One-year, $1.05 million contract	
December 17, 2015	Wade LeBlanc	Saitama Seibu Lions	Minor league contract with an invitation to spring training	
December 18, 2015	Scott Copeland	—N/a	Minor league contract with an invitation to spring training	
December 18, 2015	Roberto Hernández	Houston Astros	Minor league contract with an invitation to spring training	
December 18, 2015	Pat McCoy	Baltimore Orioles	Minor league contract with an invitation to spring training	
December 18, 2015	Brad Penny	Chicago White Sox	Minor league contract with an invitation to spring training	
December 29, 2015	Brandon Bixler	Minnesota Twins	Minor league contract	
December 29, 2015	Gabe Noyalis	Did not play in 2015	Minor league contract	
January 18, 2016	Daniel Schlereth	Chicago Cubs	Minor league contract	
January 29, 2016	Maicer Izturis	—N/a	Minor league contract with an invitation to spring training	
February 5, 2016	David Aardsma	Atlanta Braves	Minor league contract with an invitation to spring training	
February 6, 2016	Gavin Floyd	Cleveland Indians	One-year, $1 million contract	
February 8, 2016	Colt Hynes	—N/a	Minor league contract	
February 19, 2016	Tony Sanchez	Pittsburgh Pirates	Minor league contract with an invitation to spring training	
February 25, 2016	Domonic Brown	Philadelphia Phillies	Minor league contract with an invitation to spring training	
February 28, 2016	Rafael Soriano	Chicago Cubs	Minor league contract with an invitation to spring training	

==== Out ====
Date	Player	New team	Details	Ref.
November 18, 2015	Cliff Pennington	Los Angeles Angels of Anaheim	Two-year, $4 million contract	
November 23, 2015	Steve Tolleson	Baltimore Orioles	Minor league contract with an invitation to spring training	
December 1, 2015	David Price	Boston Red Sox	Seven-year, $217 million contract	
December 4, 2015	Dioner Navarro	Chicago White Sox	One-year, $4 million contract	
December 8, 2015	Mark Lowe	Detroit Tigers	Two-year, $11 million contract	
January 8, 2016	Jonathan Diaz	New York Yankees	Minor league contract	
January 21, 2016	Munenori Kawasaki	Chicago Cubs	Minor league contract with an invitation to spring training	

=== Waivers ===
==== In ====
Date	Player	Former team	Ref.
December 18, 2015	Junior Lake	Baltimore Orioles	

== Spring training ==
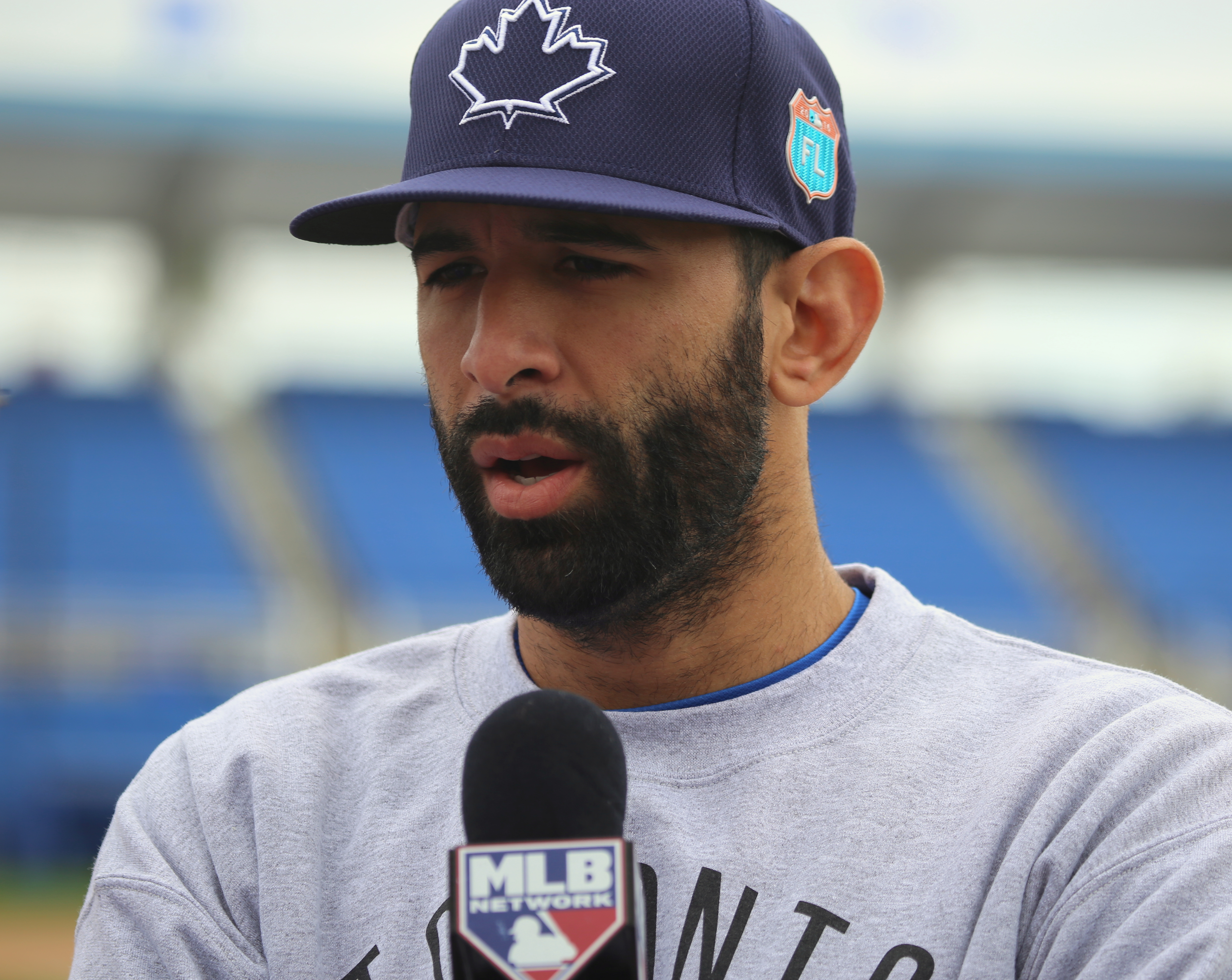
José Bautista in February 2016. Bautista made his contract demands known early in spring training, and stated he would not negotiate a "hometown discount".

Shortly after pitchers and catchers reported to Dunedin for the start of spring training on February 22, José Bautista addressed the media regarding his contract situation. Bautista, in the final year of a five-year, $65 million contract, stated that he had told the Blue Jays the length of contract he was seeking as well as the compensation of said contract, and that he would not negotiate or agree to a "hometown discount". The following day, TSN's Rick Westhead reported that Bautista had requested a five-year, $150 million contract. The report was later refuted by Bautista. While Bautista's contract situation was unfolding, the Blue Jays, Los Angeles Angels of Anaheim, and Cincinnati Reds were reported to be in agreement on a trade that would have sent Michael Saunders to the Angels, Jay Bruce to the Blue Jays, and unnamed prospects from the Angels and Blue Jays to the Reds. Hours after the trade was made public, reports surfaced that the deal was on hold due to issues with an unknown player's physical.

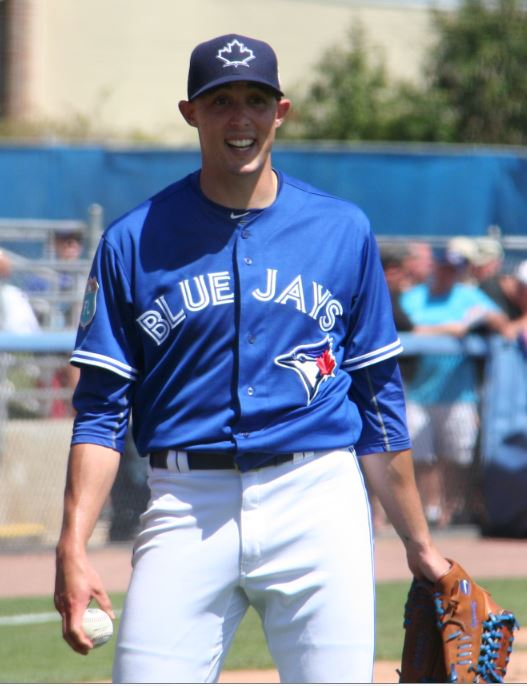
Aaron Sanchez earned the fifth starter role in spring training

On March 4, Maicer Izturis unexpectedly announced his retirement, stating "I put my heart, my soul and my body into it this year to see how I was going to feel, but my body couldn't handle it anymore. So I decided this is the last time I'm going to be playing baseball." He had appeared in one game for the Blue Jays to that point, going hitless in two at-bats. On March 18, Brad Penny, who had joined the Blue Jays on a minor league contract, announced his retirement. Two days later, Rafael Soriano announced his retirement as well. Soriano signed a minor league contract with the Blue Jays in late February, but did not appear in any spring training games due to unspecified visa issues.

On March 23, Marcus Stroman was named the Opening Day starter for the Blue Jays. The competition for fifth starter ended on March 28, when John Gibbons announced that Aaron Sanchez had earned the final rotation spot. Steve Delabar, who had been an All-Star for the Blue Jays in 2013, was released on March 29, along with Randy Choate. The final roles left to be determined were the fourth outfielder, closer, and remainder of the bullpen pitchers. On March 30, John Gibbons announced that Ezequiel Carrera would be the fourth outfielder, Roberto Osuna would begin the season in the closer's role, and Arnold León, Joe Biagini, and Ryan Tepera would round out the bullpen positions. Gibbons also announced that Marco Estrada and Aaron Loup would open the season on the disabled list. To close spring training, the Blue Jays returned to Montreal's Olympic Stadium for a two-game series against the Red Sox.

== Standings ==
=== American League East ===
AL East
Team	W	L	Pct.	GB	Home	Road
Boston Red Sox	93	69	.574	—	47‍–‍34	46‍–‍35
Toronto Blue Jays	89	73	.549	4	51‍–‍30	38‍–‍43
Baltimore Orioles	89	73	.549	4	50‍–‍31	39‍–‍42
New York Yankees	84	78	.519	9	48‍–‍33	36‍–‍45
Tampa Bay Rays	68	94	.420	25	36‍–‍45	32‍–‍49

=== American League Wild Card ===
Division leaders
Team	W	L	Pct.
Texas Rangers	95	67	.586
Cleveland Indians	94	67	.584
Boston Red Sox	93	69	.574

Wild Card teams (Top 2 teams qualify for postseason)
Team	W	L	Pct.	GB
Toronto Blue Jays	89	73	.549	—
Baltimore Orioles	89	73	.549	—
Detroit Tigers	86	75	.534	2½
Seattle Mariners	86	76	.531	3
New York Yankees	84	78	.519	5
Houston Astros	84	78	.519	5
Kansas City Royals	81	81	.500	8
Chicago White Sox	78	84	.481	11
Los Angeles Angels	74	88	.457	15
Oakland Athletics	69	93	.426	20
Tampa Bay Rays	68	94	.420	21
Minnesota Twins	59	103	.364	30

== Records vs opponents ==
	Record			Games Left		
Opponent	Home	Road	Total	Home	Road	Total
AL East
Baltimore Orioles	6–4	4–5	10–9	–	–	–
Boston Red Sox	4–5	6–4	10–9	–	–	–
New York Yankees	8–2	4–5	12–7	–	–	–
Tampa Bay Rays	3–6	5–5	8–11	–	–	–
Totals	21–17	19–19	40–36	—	—	—
AL Central
Chicago White Sox	0–3	1–2	1–5	–	–	–
Cleveland Indians	2–2	1–2	3–4	–	–	–
Detroit Tigers	3–1	1–2	4–3	–	–	–
Kansas City Royals	3–0	1–2	4–2	–	–	–
Minnesota Twins	3–0	3–1	6–1	–	–	–
Totals	11–6	7–9	18–15	–	–	–
AL West
Houston Astros	2–1	3–1	5–2	–	–	–
Los Angeles Angels	1–2	2–2	3–4	–	–	–
Oakland Athletics	2–1	1–2	3–3	–	–	–
Seattle Mariners	1–2	2–1	3–3	–	–	–
Texas Rangers	3–1	1–2	4–3	–	–	–
Totals	9–7	9–8	18–15	–	–	–
National League
Arizona Diamondbacks	1–1	2–0	3–1	–	–	–
Colorado Rockies	–	2–1	2–1	–	–	–
Los Angeles Dodgers	1–2	–	1–2	–	–	–
Philadelphia Phillies	1–1	2–0	3–1	–	–	–
San Diego Padres	2–1	–	2–1	–	–	–
San Francisco Giants	–	2–1	2–1	–	–	–
Totals	5–5	8–2	13–7	–	–	–
Grand totals	46–35	43–38	89–73	–	–	–

Month	Games	Won	Lost	Pct.
April	25	11	14	.440
May	29	17	12	.586
June	27	15	12	.556
July	24	16	8	.667
August	28	17	11	.607
September	27	11	16	.407
October	2	2	0	1.000
Totals	162	89	73	.549

== 2016 draft ==
The 2016 Major League Baseball draft was held on June 9–11.

Round	Pick	Player	Position	College/School	Nationality	Signed
1	21	T. J. Zeuch	RHP	Pittsburgh	(United States)	June 17
2*	57	J. B. Woodman	OF	Mississippi	(United States)	June 17
2	66	Bo Bichette	SS	Lakewood High School (FL)	(United States)	June 17
3	102	Zach Jackson	RHP	Arkansas	(United States)	June 20
4	132	Josh Palacios	OF	Auburn	(United States)	June 17
5	162	Cavan Biggio	2B	Notre Dame	(United States)	June 17
6	192	D. J. Daniels	OF	Ralph L. Fike High School (NC)	(United States)	June 17
7	222	Andy Ravel	RHP	Kent State	(United States)	June 17
8	252	Kyle Weatherly	RHP	Grayson	(United States)	June 17
9	282	Nick Hartman	RHP	Old Dominion	(United States)	June 17
10	312	Kirby Snead	LHP	Florida	(United States)	July 2

- – Toronto received the 57th overall selection for failing to sign pitcher Brady Singer, who was selected 56th overall in the 2015 draft.

== Regular season ==
=== Opening Day ===
Opening Day starters
Position	Name
Catcher	Russell Martin
First baseman	Chris Colabello
Second baseman	Ryan Goins
Shortstop	Troy Tulowitzki
Third baseman	Josh Donaldson
Left fielder	Michael Saunders
Center fielder	Kevin Pillar
Right fielder	José Bautista
Designated hitter	Edwin Encarnación
Pitcher	Marcus Stroman

=== April ===
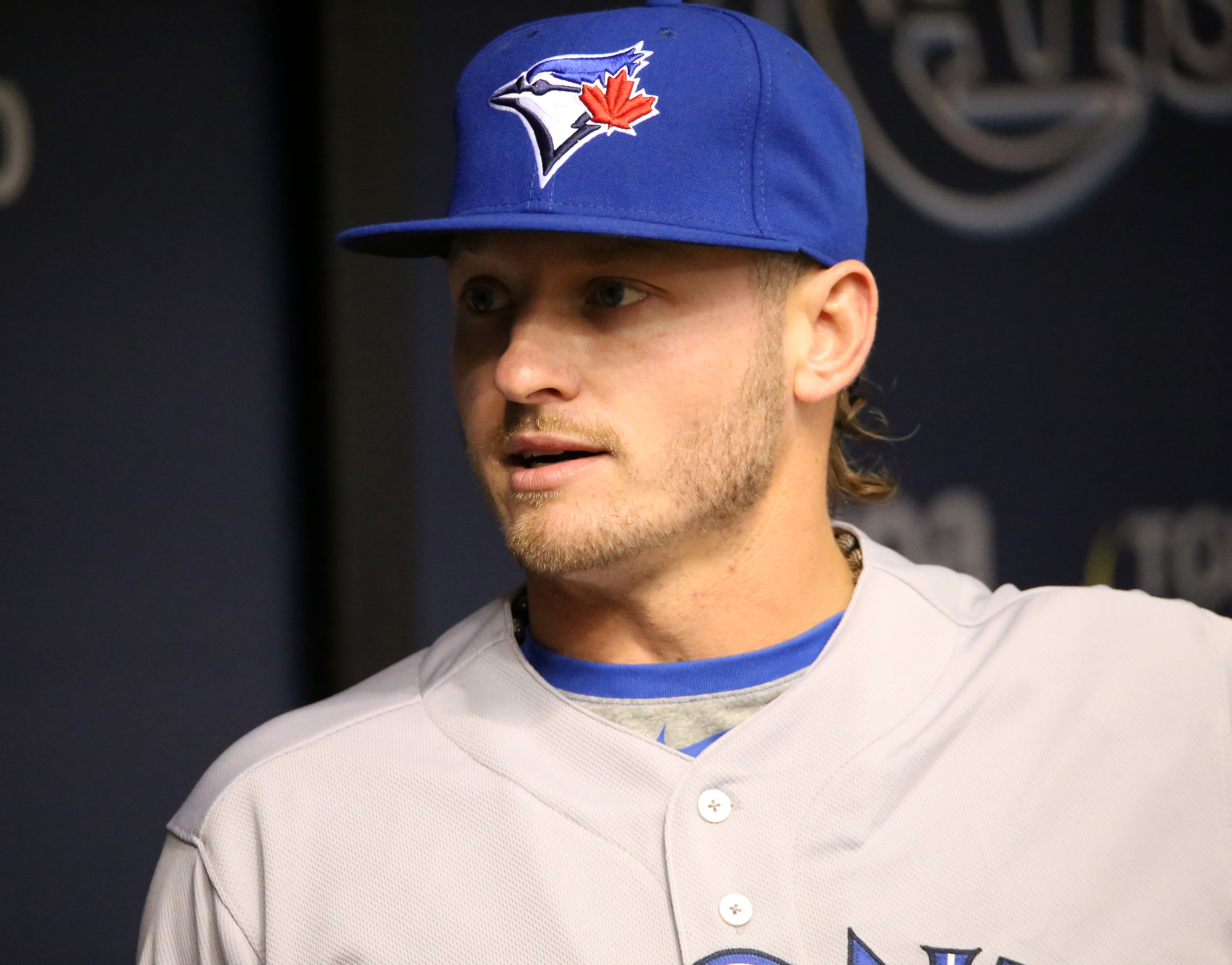
Josh Donaldson ended April tied for the American League lead in home runs, with 8.

The Blue Jays opened the 2016 season in Tampa Bay for a four-game series against the Rays. Marcus Stroman pitched into the ninth on Opening Day, and held the Rays to three runs in a 5–3 victory, closed out by Roberto Osuna. Osuna would earn the save in the second game of the series as well, finishing another 5–3 win over Tampa Bay. Jesse Chavez and Drew Storen made their debuts for the Blue Jays, each pitching one inning in the win. Brett Cecil also pitched a scoreless inning in the game, his 38th consecutive game played without allowing an earned run, which tied the MLB record set by Craig Kimbrel in 2011. Cecil's streak would end the following night, as he yielded a two-run home run to Logan Forsythe to give the Rays a 3–2 lead they would not relinquish. In the ninth inning, the Blue Jays loaded the bases with one out for Edwin Encarnación, who hit a ground ball to Evan Longoria, who threw to Forsythe at second to begin a double play. José Bautista slid into second and Forsythe threw wide of first, allowing two runs to score and giving the Blue Jays a 4–3 lead, however Rays manager Kevin Cash challenged that Bautista had violated the league's new "Chase Utley Rule" with his slide, by attempting to break-up the double play. After a short review, the umpires reversed their decision, and called both Bautista and Encarnación out, ending the game. Tampa Bay would split the series in the finale, defeating the Blue Jays 5–3. Reigning American League MVP Josh Donaldson left mid-game after injuring his right calf.

After an off-day, the Blue Jays began a three-game series against the Boston Red Sox, with Marcus Stroman taking the mound in the home opener. The Blue Jays led the game 7–2 following Josh Donaldson's second-career grand slam in the fourth inning, but in the sixth, Brock Holt hit a grand slam for the Red Sox, and the Blue Jays bullpen would blow their third lead in as many games to take the loss, 8–7. In the second game, R. A. Dickey would yield seven runs in an 8–4 loss, while José Bautista hit two home runs to record his 29th career multi-home run game. Marco Estrada, who began the season on the disabled list with a back injury, made the start in the final game of the series looking to avoid a sweep. Estrada would pitch seven shutout innings in his season debut, earning the win over the Red Sox, 3–0. The Blue Jays then battled the New York Yankees for the first time in 2016. The first game of the series went to the Yankees, who took advantage of Brett Cecil's early season struggles to win 3–2. J. A. Happ would earn the win the following night, 7–2, holding the opposition to fewer than two runs for the 11th time in his last 12 games. José Bautista also recorded his 800th career RBI in the game. Toronto would also take the rubber match, 4–2, led by 8 strong innings and 17 groundball outs from Marcus Stroman.

After travelling to Boston, the Blue Jays took on the Red Sox at Fenway Park. Edwin Encarnación hit his first two home runs of the season but the Red Sox would prevail, taking the opener 5–3. David Price made the start in the second game of the series, his first start against the Blue Jays since signing with Boston in the offseason. He would hold the Jays to two runs over seven innings and earn the win, 4–2. Aaron Sanchez recorded his third consecutive quality start of the season by holding the Sox to two hits and one run over seven innings in the third game of the series, and took a no-hitter into the fifth inning. The Blue Jays would win the game, 5–3. The final game of the series, played on Patriots' Day, saw the Blue Jays hang on to win, 4–3. Drew Storen recorded his first save with Toronto, as Roberto Osuna was unavailable for the game. Nearing the end of 17 consecutive games against AL East opponents to open the season, the Blue Jays travelled to Baltimore to play the first-place Orioles. The first game of the series saw Marcus Stroman earn his third win of the season, as Toronto gave the Orioles their first loss at home in 2016. The second game of the series went into extra innings tied 3–3. Rookie Joe Biagini loaded the bases in the tenth inning, and allowed the Orioles to score the winning run on a wild pitch. In the rubber match, the Orioles would beat the Blue Jays 3–2, after Toronto was unable to score after plating two runs in the first inning.

Returning home with an 8–9 record, the Blue Jays would battle the Oakland Athletics, who entered the series undefeated on the road in 2016. Hours prior to the game, MLB announced that Chris Colabello had been suspended for 80 games, after testing positive for performance-enhancing drugs in March. Aaron Sanchez struggled through the worst start of his young career, allowing six earned runs in 4 1/3 innings pitched, as the Blue Jays lost 8–5. The Blue Jays offence, which lead all of MLB in 2015, appeared to get back on track in the second game, as Troy Tulowitzki recorded his 12th career multi-home run game and Josh Donaldson also homered and drove in four runs in a 9–3 victory. In the final game of the series, Drew Hutchison was recalled from Triple-A Buffalo to make a spot start for the Jays. He held the Athletics to 2 runs over 5 2/3 innings as the Blue Jays won the series, 6–3. Toronto then battled the first-place Chicago White Sox in a three-game series. The Jays held a four run lead in the first game, only to have their bullpen yield the lead in the seventh inning, and take a 7–5 loss. In the second game, White Sox ace Chris Sale earned his league-leading fifth win of the season, beating the Blue Jays 10–1. Chicago would complete the sweep of the Blue Jays with a 4–0 win in the third game of the series.

After a day off, the Blue Jays closed out April in Tampa Bay, where their season began. Michael Saunders recorded his first two home run game as a Blue Jay, and Aaron Sanchez rebounded from his previous start, throwing seven shutout innings to lead the Blue Jays to a 6–1 victory. Brett Cecil took his fifth loss of the season in the final game of April, 4–3, by allowing the winning run to score in the bottom of the ninth inning without recording an out. In taking the loss, Cecil became the first relief pitcher since at least the 1913 season to earn five losses in April.

=== May ===
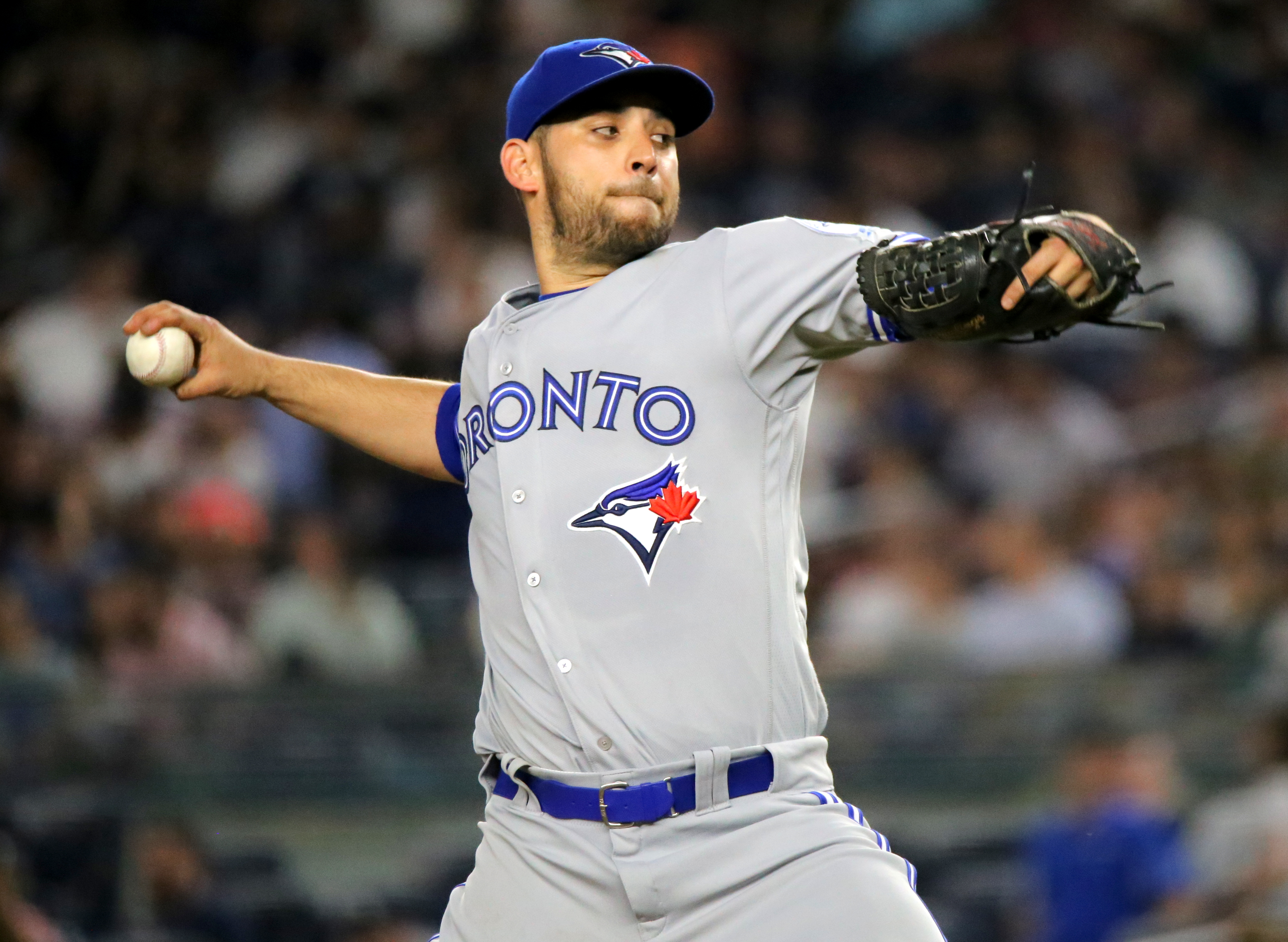
Batters hit just .138 against Marco Estrada in May, who pitched to a 2.14 ERA over 42 innings in the month.

In the rubber match against Tampa, Marcus Stroman earned his team-leading fourth win of the season, defeating the Rays 5–1. The Blue Jays were held to just 15 hits in the three-game series, but hit 8 home runs. The Blue Jays then returned to Toronto to face the Texas Rangers for the first time since defeating them in the 2015 ALDS. The Rangers would win the first game of the series, 2–1, and give the Jays their fourth loss in a row at home. In the second game of the series, Justin Smoak hit his first home run of the season to tie the game in the ninth inning, and in the tenth, hit a walk-off two-run home run to give the Blue Jays a 3–1 victory. Russell Martin gave the Blue Jays their second-consecutive walk-off win the following night, 4–3, after knocking in the winning run with a single to right field in the ninth inning. Toronto would take the series finale, tagging Rangers starter Derek Holland for 11 earned runs in a 12–2 win. The Blue Jays scored double-digit runs for the first time in 2016, and Edwin Encarnación hit his 202nd home run with the Blue Jays, tying George Bell for fifth all-time. The Jays then battled the Los Angeles Dodgers at home for three games. The first game was taken by the Blue Jays, 5–2, aided by Kevin Pillar's tie-breaking three-run home run in the eighth inning. In the second game, the Blue Jays were held in check by Clayton Kershaw, who earned the win over Toronto, 6–2. The Blue Jays fell in the rubber match, 4–2, with Drew Storen taking the loss after another poor performance in relief of Marco Estrada's seven strong innings.

Continuing their interleague play, the Blue Jays travelled to San Francisco to battle the Giants in a three-game series. In the first of two favourable pitching matches, the Blue Jays sent Aaron Sanchez to the mound to face Jake Peavy, who entered with a 9.00 earned run average. Toronto would take the first game of the series, 3–1. J. A. Happ started the second game for the Blue Jays, taking on Matt Cain, who owned an ERA over 7 at the start of play. Happ earned his team-leading fifth win, lowered his ERA to 2.08, and came within one out of a complete game shutout as the Blue Jays won by a score of 4–0. The Blue Jays were denied their first sweep of the 2016 season, losing the finale 5–4 in the 13th inning. The team ended their six-game road trip in Arlington, Texas, to take on the Rangers. The Blue Jays won the first game of the series, shutting out the Rangers 5–0 in R. A. Dickey's best start of the season to that point. In the second game, Justin Smoak and Troy Tulowitzki hit back-to-back home runs to tie the game 5–5 in the ninth inning. However, Drew Stubbs would hit a walk-off home run in the tenth to even the series.

Blue Jays–Rangers brawl

The final game of the series, a 7–6 loss for the Blue Jays, was filled with controversy. In the eighth inning, José Bautista, who had given the Blue Jays a 5–2 lead earlier in the game with a bases-clearing double, was hit by a pitch from Rangers reliever Matt Bush. The move was largely considered as retaliation for Bautista flipping his bat after hitting a go-ahead three-run home run in the 2015 ALDS, and resulted in both benches being warned by the home plate umpire, Dan Iassogna. Justin Smoak later grounded into a would-be double play, however Bautista slid hard into second base, taking out Rougned Odor and preventing the double play from being completed. Odor took exception to Bautista's slide, and retaliated by punching Bautista in the face, which resulted in a bench-clearing brawl. Bautista was called for an illegal slide, which ended the inning. Bautista, Odor, and Josh Donaldson were ejected in the brawl. Donaldson got ejected for attempting to tackle Odor in the brawl after Odor punched Bautista. In the bottom half of the inning, Jesse Chavez hit Prince Fielder with his first pitch, which resulted in the ejections of Chavez, Blue Jays bench coach DeMarlo Hale, and Rangers bench coach Steve Buechele. Blue Jays manager John Gibbons and first base coach Tim Leiper were also ejected earlier in the game. Leiper was ejected for arguing with first base umpire Dale Scott, and Gibbons was ejected by Iassogna for arguing balls and strikes.

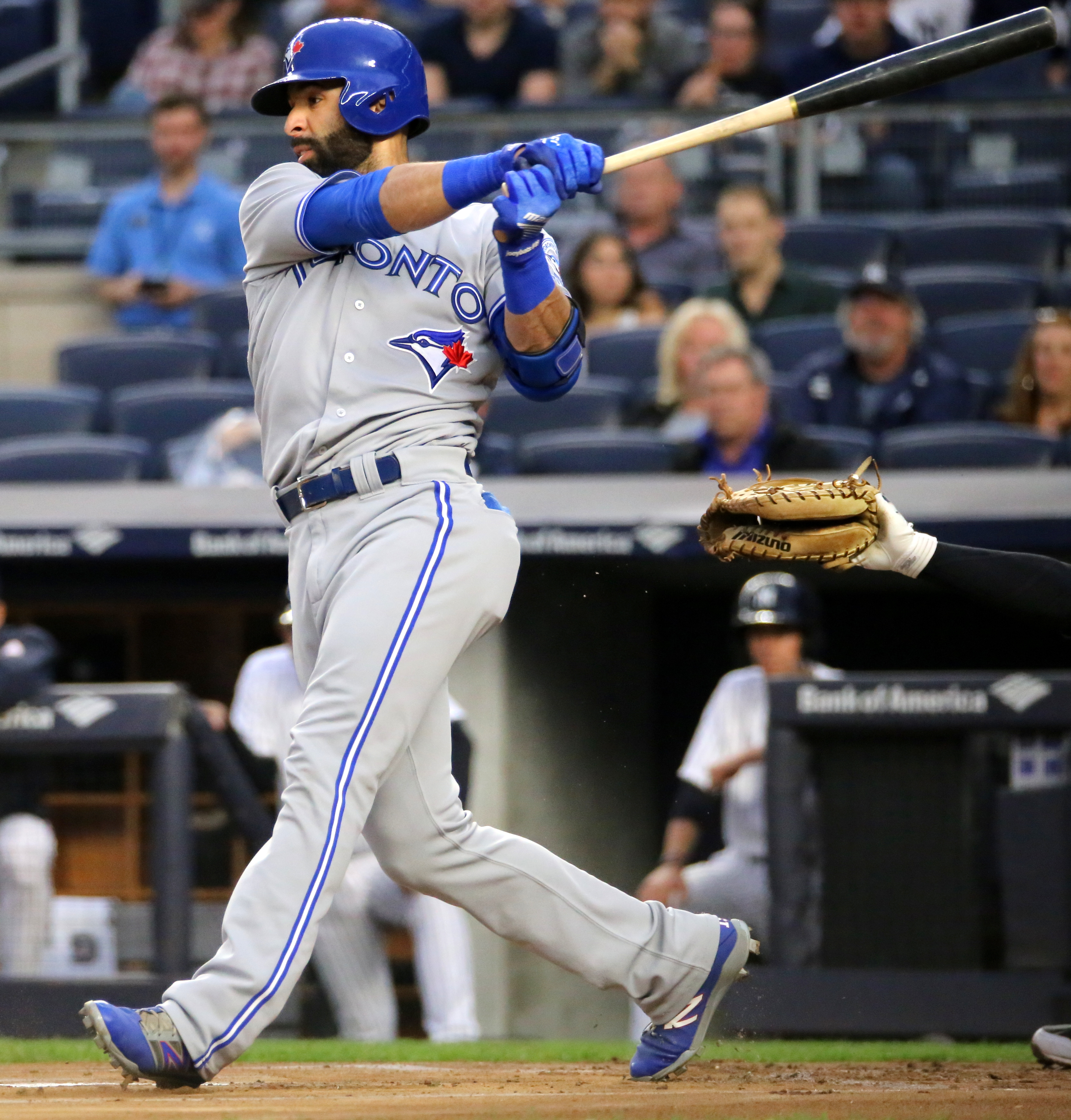
José Bautista was suspended for one game for his role in the Blue Jays–Rangers brawl. His suspension was upheld after appeal, and he sat out a game on May 27.

Following their brawl with the Rangers, the Blue Jays went home for a short, three-game home stand against Tampa Bay. The Rays took the first game of the series, 13–2, giving J. A. Happ his first loss of the season. Prior to the second game, punishments for the Blue Jays and Rangers were handed down by Joe Torre, MLB's chief baseball officer. John Gibbons and Jesse Chavez were each suspended three games (Gibbons for coming back onto the field after being ejected), while José Bautista and Tim Leiper were suspended for one game. Both Bautista and Chavez appealed their suspensions. Gibbons was also fined $5,000, and Josh Donaldson and Kevin Pillar were fined an undisclosed amount. For the Rangers, Rougned Odor was fined and suspended for eight games (reduced to 7 games on appeal), and Elvis Andrus was suspended one game. Matt Bush, Sam Dyson, A. J. Griffin, and Robinson Chirinos were each fined an undisclosed amount. The Rays would again win by blow-out, defeating the Blue Jays 12–2 that night. Tampa Bay would complete the sweep with a 6–3 win in the finale, giving the Blue Jays their first five-game losing streak of the 2016 season.

Looking to end the streak, the Blue Jays took on the last-place Minnesota Twins in Minneapolis. The first game would go into extra innings before Troy Tulowitzki drove in the go-ahead run in the eleventh. Joe Biagini would earn his first career save in the game, closing out the 3–2 win. An offensive outburst would power the Jays to victory in the second game of the series, 9–3, led by home runs from José Bautista, Josh Donaldson, Michael Saunders, and Darwin Barney. J. A. Happ would pitch seven scoreless innings against the Twins the following day, however Minnesota would score five runs in the eighth inning to take a 5–3 lead that they would not relinquish. The Blue Jays ended the four-game series on a high note, winning the finale 3–1 thanks to another strong pitching performance from staff ace Marcus Stroman. The Jays ended their road trip playing the Yankees for three games. In 2015, Toronto played to an 8–2 record in New York. Their first game did not go as planned, as the Yankees handed the Jays their second shutout of the season, 6–0. Russell Martin hit his first two home runs of the 2016 season in the second game, leading the Blue Jays to an 8–4 victory, their first of the season when allowing 4 or more runs. The game also saw the return of Devon Travis, who went 1–4 at the plate and scored a run. In their final road game of May, the Blue Jays held New York to a single run, taking the series with a 3–1 win.

Returning home after a 5–2 road trip, the Blue Jays clashed with the first-place Red Sox for three games. Prior to the start of the first game, Major League Baseball announced that José Bautista's suspension had been upheld, and he was subsequently removed from the starting line-up. Josh Donaldson led the Jays to a 7–5 victory that night, hitting 2 home runs and knocking in 5 runs. With the Red Sox leading 8–4 in the second game, the Jays battled back to tie the game in the bottom of the eighth inning. In the top of the ninth, David Ortiz hit his 40th career home run at the Rogers Centre, giving Boston a 9–8 lead. With Craig Kimbrel on to preserve the lead, Justin Smoak hit a two-out single to put the tying run on base. After pinch runner Ezequiel Carrera advanced to third base on an error, Russell Martin drilled an RBI double to tie the game. Martin advanced to third base on a passed ball, before Devon Travis hit a walk-off single to complete the comeback, 10–9. David Price got the start in the final game of the series, making his first appearance in Toronto since signing a seven-year, $217 million contract with the Red Sox. Boston would take the game, 5–3, after scoring two runs in the eleventh inning to take the lead. The Jays closed out May with a home series against the Yankees. Marco Estrada pitched eight scoreless innings in the first game, leading Toronto to a 4–2 win. The second game of the series went into the seventh inning tied 1–1, before hits from Kevin Pillar and Darwin Barney drove in three runs to seal a 4–1 win for the Jays.

=== June ===
The Blue Jays would complete their first sweep of the season with a 7–0 victory over the Yankees on June 1, with the Jays scoring five runs off Kirby Yates and Nick Goody in the seventh inning. After a day off, Toronto began a six-game road trip with three games against the Red Sox. R. A. Dickey took a no-hitter into the sixth inning in the first game of the series, and the Blue Jays offence got the better of David Price in a 5–2 victory. The Blue Jays also ended a 26-game hitting streak by Xander Bogaerts in the game. In the second game, Marcus Stroman was hit hard by the Red Sox offence. He allowed six earned runs for the third time in his last four games and took the loss, 6–4. In the rubber match, Marco Estrada took a no-hitter into the eighth inning before yielding a solo home run to Chris Young. Roberto Osuna would close out the 5–4 win with a rocky ninth inning, in which he surrendered two runs on four hits. The series victory gave the Blue Jays a 9–3 record over their run of 12 straight games against Boston and New York. The Blue Jays concluded their road trip with three games in Detroit. The Tigers' rookie pitcher Michael Fulmer held Toronto off the board in the first game, winning 11–0. Aaron Sanchez pitched a gem in the second game of the series, shutting out the Tigers over eight innings. In the ninth frame, Sanchez allowed two hits and one run, before turning the game over to the bullpen, who were unable to hold the lead. The Tigers would win the game in the tenth inning, 3–2. Toronto avoided the sweep with a 7–2 victory, led by Josh Donaldson, who finished a double shy of the cycle.

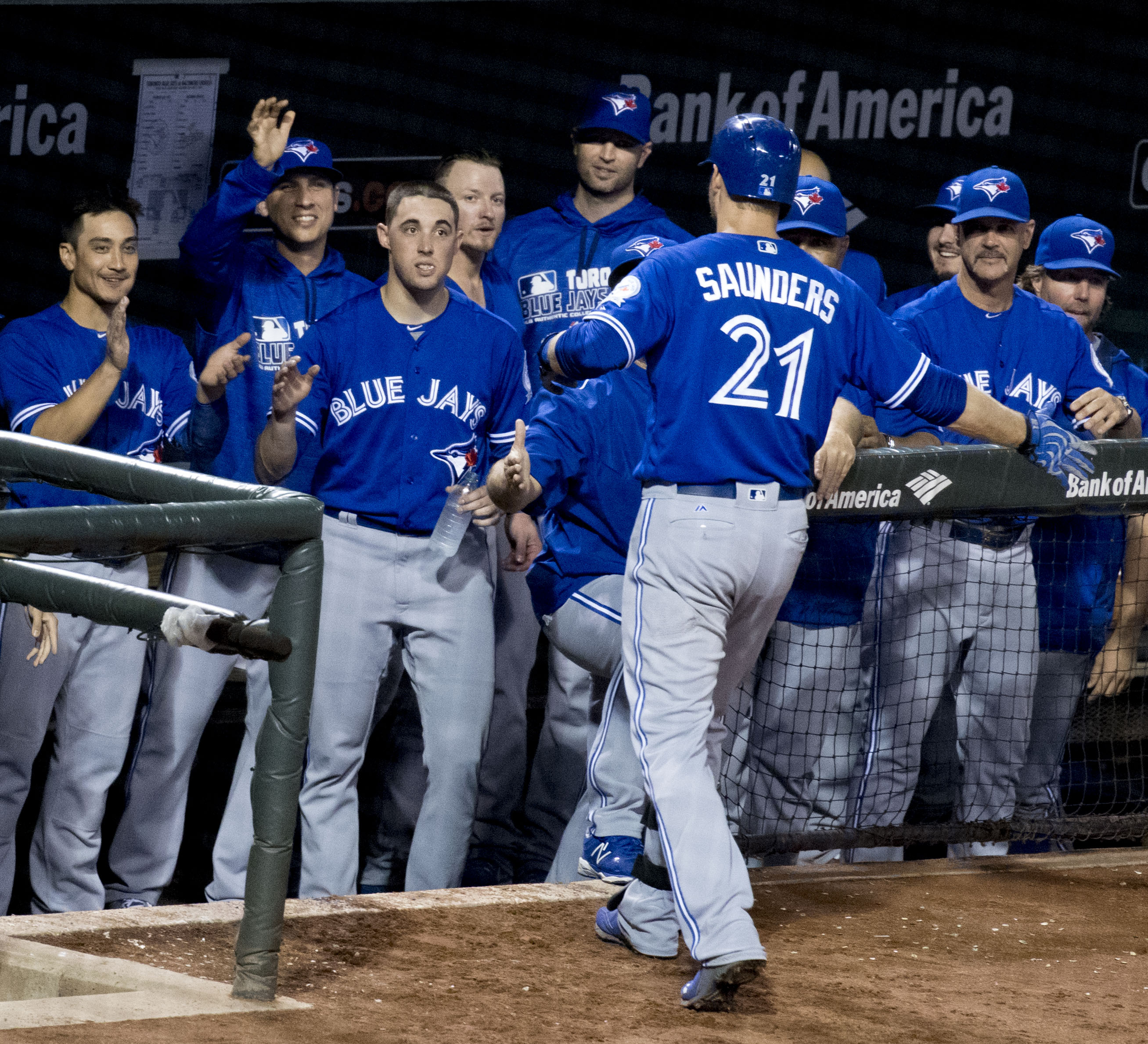
Michael Saunders celebrates with teammates after hitting his third home run in a game against the Baltimore Orioles on June 17.

Returning home, the Blue Jays squared-off against the first-place Orioles. Baltimore would come out on top of the first game, 6–5, taking advantage of a struggling Marcus Stroman. Game two went into extra innings, tied 3–3, before Edwin Encarnación hit a walk-off solo home run in the tenth inning. Encarnación drove in five runs the following day, leading the Jays to an 11–6 victory. In the fourth and final game of the series, the Blue Jays beat up on Ubaldo Jiménez, knocking him out of the game in the first inning after scoring five runs. Baltimore would claw back to within a run in the ninth inning, before Jason Grilli was able to end the game, 10–9, and earn his first save with Toronto. Following the series with Baltimore, the Philadelphia Phillies would come to Toronto for a home-and-home series against the Jays. The potent Toronto offence was stymied by Phillies starter Jerad Eickhoff, losing the first game 7–0. They would get back on track in the second game, knocking around Zach Eflin in his Major League debut. Josh Donaldson would hit a grand slam, and Ezequiel Carrera, Kevin Pillar, and Edwin Encarnación also hit home runs in an 11–3 trouncing. After travelling to Philadelphia for the second half of the series, Marco Estrada lead the Jays to a 7–2 win with his tenth consecutive start allowing five or fewer hits, which extended his franchise record. The Blue Jays offence would again prove to be too much for Phillies pitching to handle, as a five home run game led Toronto to a 13–2 win in the series finale. The win came at a price, as José Bautista left the game with a left foot injury. The following day, he was placed on the 15-day disabled list. In the first game of the Blue Jays road series against Baltimore, Michael Saunders became the fourth Canadian player in MLB history to hit three home runs in a game, and led the Toronto offence to their fifth game with double-digit runs scored in their last seven games played. Baltimore would end the Jays four-game winning streak the following day, winning 4–2. The Orioles would take the series with an 11–6 win in the final game of the series, driving Marcus Stroman's ERA to a career-high 5.23.

The Blue Jays opened a brief two-game homestand against the Arizona Diamondbacks after an off-day. Marco Estrada and the Toronto bullpen held the Diamondbacks to just three hits in the first game, but Arizona would win 4–2. The Jays would split the series, taking the final game 5–2 thanks to home runs from Russell Martin, Troy Tulowitzki, and Edwin Encarnación. Toronto would fall to 0–4 against the Chicago White Sox in 2016, losing the first game of their six-game road trip by a score of 3–2. In the second game, the Toronto pitching staff would yield seven home runs to the White Sox, however the Blue Jays would hold on to win 10–8. The White Sox would take the series with a 5–2 win in the third and final game, with ace Chris Sale earning his league-leading thirteenth win. The Blue Jays would then travel to Colorado to take on the Rockies. In 15 games between Toronto and Colorado, the road team had never defeated the home team. The Rockies would keep that streak alive in the first game, defeating the Jays 9–5 after scoring six runs in the seventh inning. Toronto would end the streak in the second game of the series, 14–9, with J. A. Happ earning his tenth win of the season in a game that was delayed for almost three hours due to a hail storm. The Blue Jays would take the series with a 5–3 win in the finale, led by another strong pitching performance by Aaron Sanchez. To close June, the Blue Jays returned home to take on the red-hot Cleveland Indians, who entered the series on a 12-game winning streak. They would continue to roll in the first game of the four-game series, winning 4–1.

=== July ===
The second game against Cleveland on Canada Day turned into a marathon match, stretching into the nineteenth inning tied 1–1. While the Indians used Trevor Bauer, who had been scheduled to start the third game of the series, the Blue Jays eventually turned to position players Ryan Goins and Darwin Barney to pitch late in the game. Barney would yield the go-ahead run in the top of the nineteenth, leading to a 2–1 win for Cleveland. The game was not without controversy, as Edwin Encarnación, John Gibbons, and Russell Martin were all ejected by home-plate umpire Vic Carapazza for arguing about the strike zone. Toronto would end Cleveland's 14-game winning streak with a 9–6 win the following day. Prior to the series finale, Edwin Encarnación was suspended for one game after bumping into umpire Vic Carapazza on Canada Day. Encarnación appealed the suspension, and was allowed to play. In the game, the high-octane Toronto offence would crush Corey Kluber and the Indians by a score of 17–1. J. A. Happ became the Blue Jays' first pitcher with eleven wins prior to the All-Star break since Roy Halladay in 2008. The Blue Jays then battled the Kansas City Royals in a rematch of the 2015 ALCS. Aaron Sanchez earned his ninth win of the season in the first game of the three-game series, holding the Royals to one run over his eight innings pitched. The Blue Jays would prevail in the second game, 8–3, led by a two-home run game from Josh Donaldson. During the game, the starting and reserve rosters for the 2016 All-Star Game were announced. Donaldson, Edwin Encarnación, and Marco Estrada were all named as All-Star reserves. In addition, Michael Saunders was named as one of five American League Final Vote candidates. Marcus Stroman would lead the Jays to a sweep of the Royals with a 4–2 victory in the final game. To close out the unofficial first half of the season, Toronto took on the Detroit Tigers for four games. The Blue Jays would come from behind in the first game of the series, with Troy Tulowitzki driving in the tying and go-ahead runs in the bottom of the eighth inning. Roberto Osuna would close out the 5–4 victory. Prior to the second game, Saunders was announced as the Final Vote winner, and became the fourth Toronto representative for the All-Star game. J. A. Happ would lead the Blue Jays to a 6–0 victory that night, earning his twelfth win of the season and tying his career-high in wins. The Tigers would end Toronto's seven-game winning streak the following day, winning 3–2. After the game, Aaron Sanchez was named as Craig Kimbrel's replacement to the All-Star Game. In the final game before the All-Star break, R. A. Dickey would hold the Tigers offence to a single run in a 6–1 Blue Jays victory. Edwin Encarnación sat out of this game after choosing to drop his appeal of the one-game suspension he received earlier in the month.

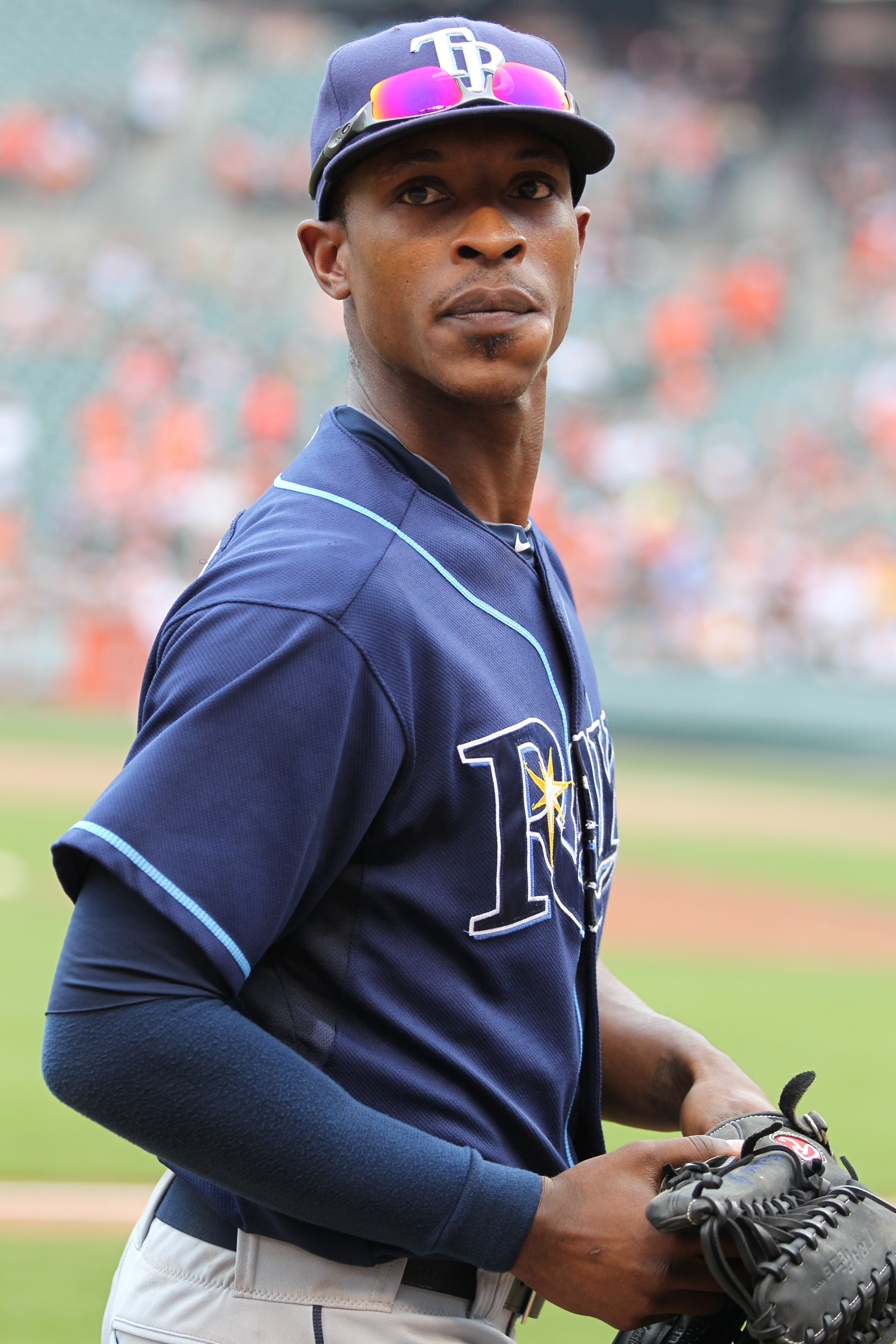
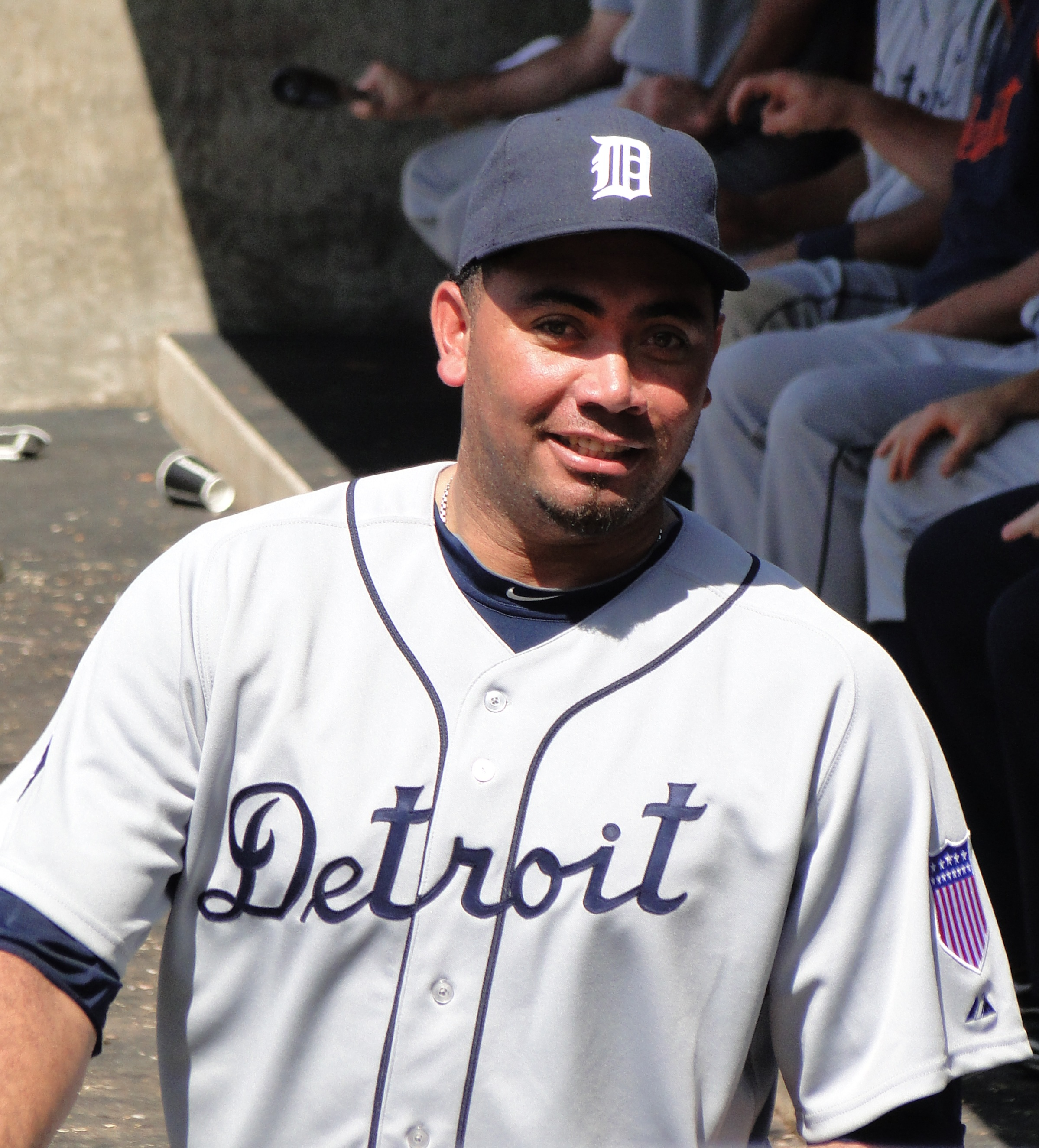
The Blue Jays acquired Melvin Upton Jr. and Joaquín Benoit in July.

Following the All-Star break, the Blue Jays visited Oakland to play three games against the Athletics. The Blue Jays lost the very back-and-forth first game 8–7, despite leading 7–3 earlier on. They also lost the second game, 5–4; as R. A. Dickey allowed all of Oakland's runs on three home runs. The Jays avoided getting swept, winning the finale 5–3 after Josh Donaldson doubled in the ninth inning to take the lead. Following an off day, the Blue Jays played a two-game series in Arizona against the Diamondbacks. In the first game, Aaron Sanchez pitched seven innings and only surrendered one run, while Edwin Encarnación, who has a history of hitting well in Arizona, hit a three-run home run, helping Toronto win 5–1. The Jays completed the sweep the next day, this time winning 10–4, backed by eight strong innings from Marcus Stroman, who only allowed one run.

The Blue Jays returned home for a nine-game homestand to close out the month of July. Facing the Seattle Mariners for the first time in 2016, the Toronto offence was stymied by James Paxton and the Seattle bullpen, losing the first game 2–1. R. A. Dickey had the shortest outing of his Blue Jays career in the second game, going only three innings and allowing six earned runs, including a grand slam to Nelson Cruz. Seattle would score five more runs off Jesse Chavez and three off Drew Storen to take the second game of the series, 14–5. The Blue Jays would avoid being swept, winning the final game of the series 2–0. J. A. Happ earned his thirteenth win of the season, establishing a new career-high in wins. Shortly before the start of the third game against Seattle, Drew Storen was designated for assignment. With trade rumours swirling, the Blue Jays took on the San Diego Padres for three games, which were the first games for the Padres in Toronto in franchise history. Aaron Sanchez earned his tenth consecutive winning decision, leading Toronto to a 4–2 victory with seven strong innings. Before the start of the second game, the Blue Jays and Padres made a trade, with the Padres sending Melvin Upton Jr. and cash considerations to the Blue Jays for minor league pitcher Hansel Rodriguez. Upton would make his debut with the Jays in the seventh inning of the game, pinch-hitting and grounding into a fielder's choice. Tied 4–4, the game went into the twelfth inning, where Matt Kemp hit a two-run home run to give the Padres a 6–4 lead. However, the Blue Jays would battle back, scoring on a bases-loaded walk by José Bautista and a fielder's choice groundout by Josh Donaldson, before Devon Travis would score the winning run on a wild pitch to take the game, 7–6. Immediately following the game, the Blue Jays announced another trade. Drew Storen was sent to the Seattle Mariners in exchange for Joaquín Benoit. The Padres would come out on top in the final game of the series, hitting two home runs off starter R. A. Dickey to win 8–4. The two home runs increased Dickey's total to 26 on the season, which tied him for the league-lead in home runs allowed. The Blue Jays wrapped July by hosting the Baltimore Orioles, whom they trailed by 1 1/2 games for the AL East lead, for a critical three-game series. The Blue Jays won the first game 6–5, aided by three solo home runs in the first inning and cutting the Orioles' division lead to half a game. The next day, the Toronto defeated Baltimore 9–1, after scoring seven runs in the fifth inning and took a half-game lead in the division. The Blue Jays would not complete the sweep and would lose their division lead in the final match of the series, giving up a 2–0 lead and eventually losing 6–2 in the twelfth inning. Troy Tulowitzki suffered a chip-fracture in his right thumb after being hit by a pitch, and left the game.

=== August ===
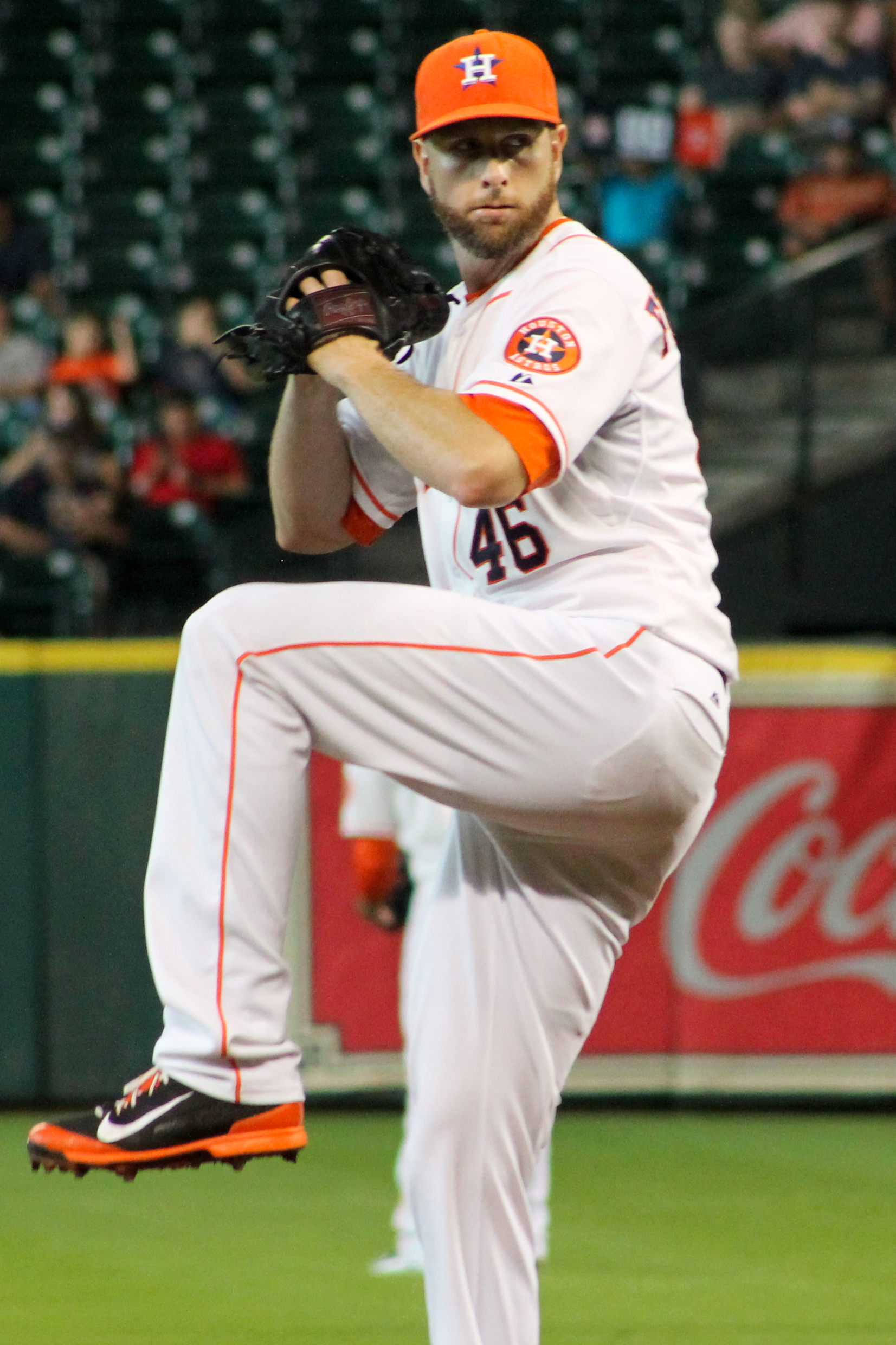
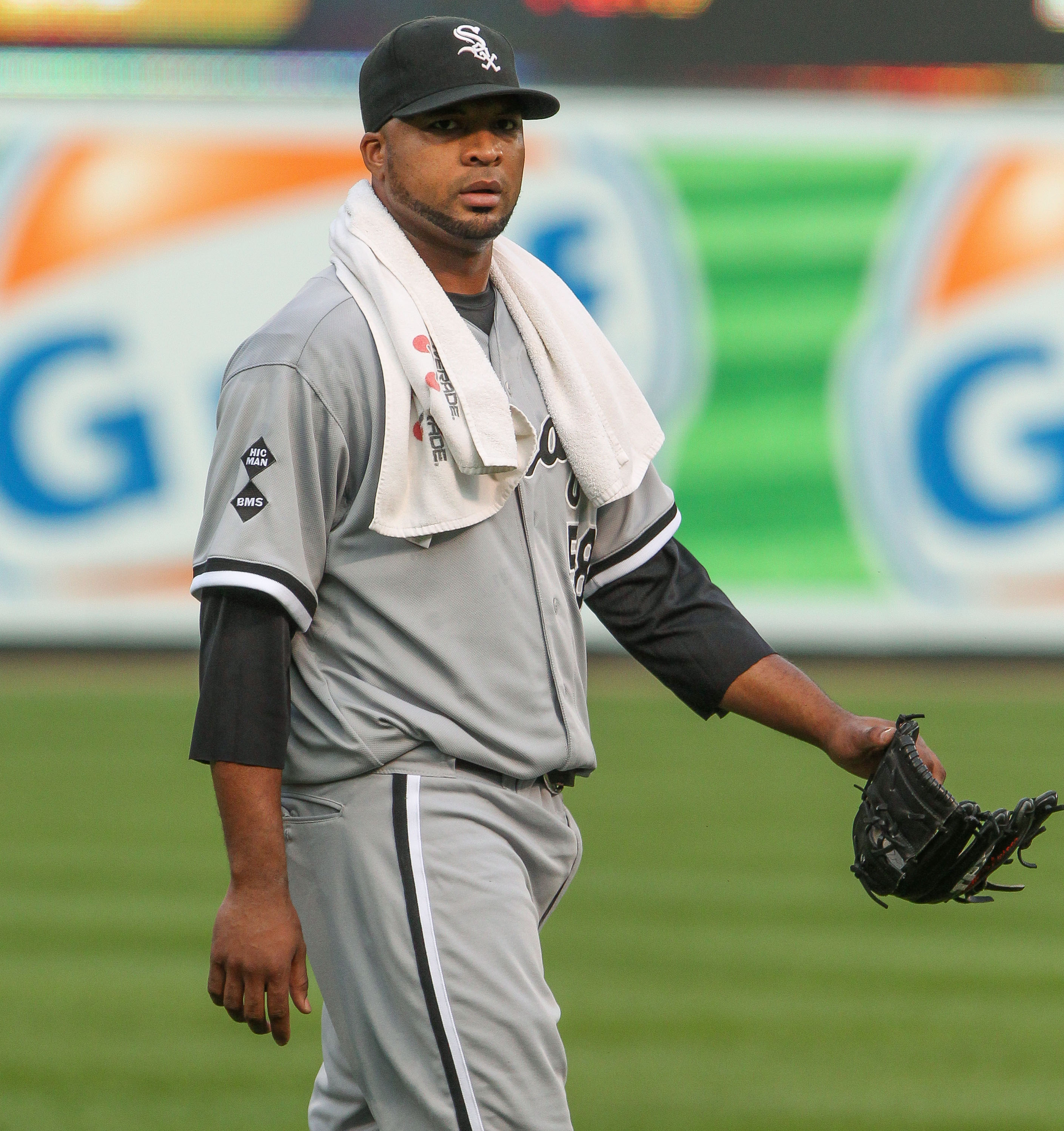
The Blue Jays acquired Scott Feldman and Francisco Liriano a few minutes before the trade deadline.

The Blue Jays opened August with a four-game series in Houston. Prior to the game, the Blue Jays made three trades before the 4 p.m. ET trade deadline. The first trade sent Jesse Chavez and cash considerations to the Los Angeles Dodgers for pitcher Mike Bolsinger. Shortly after, the Jays made a trade with the Astros, sending minor league pitcher Guadalupe Chavez to Houston for Scott Feldman. With one minute remaining before the deadline, the Blue Jays traded Drew Hutchison to the Pittsburgh Pirates for Francisco Liriano, Reese McGuire, and Harold Ramírez. The game against the Astros that night went tied 1–1 into extra innings. Scott Feldman ended up taking the loss for Toronto, yielding a lead-off single to Jose Altuve before Carlos Correa knocked him in with a walk-off double in the fourteenth inning. Marcus Stroman set a new career-high with 13 strikeouts in the game. José Bautista hit his 300th career home run in the second game of the series as Toronto won 2–1, aided by a strong pitching performance from R. A. Dickey. Marco Estrada would hold Houston to a single run in the third game of the series, and the offence would hit three solo home runs to win 3–1. The Blue Jays would capture the series in the final game, winning 4–1. Edwin Encarnación hit his 30th home run of the season, and J. A. Happ earned his 15th win, tying Stephen Strasburg for the MLB lead. To close their road trip, the Blue Jays played three games in Kauffman Stadium against the Royals in Kansas City, Missouri. Devon Travis hit a leadoff home run in the first game to give the Jays an early lead, and in the ninth inning, he would hit a go-ahead home run to lead Toronto to a 4–3 win. Aaron Sanchez had his ten-game winning streak spanned by the Royals in the second game, losing 4–2. The Royals would take the series with a 7–1 win over the Blue Jays in the finale.

Returning home from a road trip that saw just 17 total runs of offence, the Blue Jays battled the Rays for three games. Devon Travis led the way in the first game, recording four hits for the first time in his career as the Blue Jays topped the Rays, 7–5. The Rays would get the better of Marco Estrada and the Toronto bullpen in the second game, handing the Jays a 9–2 loss. In the series finale, J. A. Happ became the season's first 16-game winner, shutting out Tampa over six innings in a 7–0 win. As the Orioles lost their game to Oakland later that night, the victory put Toronto in first place by a full game for the first time in the 2016 season. Looking to expand their division lead, the Jays took on the Astros once again. Former Blue Jays draftee Joe Musgrove made the start in the first game for Houston and pitched seven innings to lead the Astros to a 5–3 win over Toronto. Aaron Sanchez put the Blue Jays in a 2–0 hole to begin the second game, but regrouped and pitched seven strong innings. Russell Martin would hit a three-run home run late in the game to lift the Blue Jays to a 4–2 victory. Roberto Osuna earned his 46th career save in the win, tying Terry Forster's record for saves prior to a pitcher's 22nd birthday. The Jays would take the series with a 9–2 win in the finale, led by a strong pitching performance by Marcus Stroman and home runs from Edwin Encarnación, Troy Tulowitzki, and Russell Martin.

Embarking on their second road trip of August, the Blue Jays went to New York to take on the Yankees. Entering the series, the Jays had won four consecutive series at Yankee Stadium. Rookie Chad Green started the first game of the series for New York and dominated the Blue Jays, pitching six shutout innings and striking out eleven in a 1–0 win. In the second game, the Yankees took a 5–0 lead into a 45-minute rain delay. After the rain, Scott Feldman would give up another run to New York before the Toronto offence would score 12 unanswered runs to win 12–6. Russell Martin hit two home runs and Troy Tulowitzki had four hits in a game for the first time as a Blue Jay. Toronto would take the third and final game of the series by a score of 7–4, giving J. A. Happ his 17th win, which broke a tie with Rick Porcello for the league-lead. The Blue Jays became the sixth team in MLB history to win five consecutive road series against the Yankees, and the first since the Cleveland Indians in 1969. Coincidentally, the Blue Jays then travelled to Cleveland to play the Indians for three games in what some considered to be a playoff preview. Toronto took a 2–1 lead into the ninth inning of the first game, before Roberto Osuna allowed back-to-back solo home runs to give Cleveland the 3–2 victory. In the second game, the Blue Jays again took a one run lead into the ninth inning, however this time Osuna would close the game without issue, leading the Jays to a 6–5 win. Prior to the series finale, the Blue Jays optioned Aaron Sanchez to the Advanced-A Dunedin Blue Jays to skip his next start, limit his innings, and allow his roster space to be used by Aaron Loup. Brett Cecil would be called upon to pitch the eighth inning of the finale, and protect a 2–1 lead. Cecil would allow a two-run home run to José Ramírez that gave the Indians a 3–2 lead they would not relinquish.

Coming back to Toronto with a 3–3 record over their road trip, the Blue Jays battled the last-place Los Angeles Angels for the first time in 2016. R. A. Dickey held the Angels to a single run over 6 2/3 innings, leading Toronto to a 7–2 win. The Angels offence got to Marco Estrada early and often in the second game of the series, tagging him for a season-high ten hits and six runs and defeating the Jays 8–2. In the rubber match, the Angels handed J. A. Happ his first loss since June, taking the game and the series, 6–3. Hoping to bounce back from a disappointing series against one last-place team, Toronto then took on another last-place team in the Minnesota Twins. The first game would see a resurgence for the Blue Jays offence, as Justin Smoak and Russell Martin each recorded 5 RBI to lead the Jays to a 15–8 victory. The Blue Jays trailed the Twins 5–1 in the next match of the series, before working their way back into the game. Down 7–6 in the bottom of the eighth inning, Melvin Upton Jr. hit a triple and came in to score on an error by Max Kepler on the play, giving Toronto an 8–7 lead that they would successfully hold. The Blue Jays would complete the sweep with another come-from-behind victory, winning 9–6, and taking a two-game lead over the Red Sox for the division lead. Josh Donaldson hit three home runs for the first time in his career, and was showered with baseball caps from the fans after completing the hat-trick.

Bringing August to a close, the Blue Jays embarked upon a crucial nine-game road trip against three AL East teams, beginning with the Baltimore Orioles. Marco Estrada would yield just a single run to the Baltimore offence, and Josh Donaldson would homer for the fourth time in two games to lead Toronto to a 5–1 win in the series opener. Dioner Navarro reported to the team before the game, and Josh Thole was designated for assignment to make room on the roster. The Orioles would take the second game, 5–3, with Matt Wieters hitting a go-ahead, two-run home run off Jason Grilli in the eighth inning. Aaron Sanchez was recalled from Advanced-A Dunedin to make the start in the series finale, and held the Orioles to a single unearned run through six innings of work. Sanchez would earn his 13th win of the season, as the Blue Jays took the series, 5–3. Shortly before the end of the month, Josh Thole was re-signed by the Blue Jays, allowing him to maintain his postseason roster eligibility. To make room on the roster, Devon Travis was optioned to the Rookie-Advanced Bluefield Blue Jays.

=== September–October ===
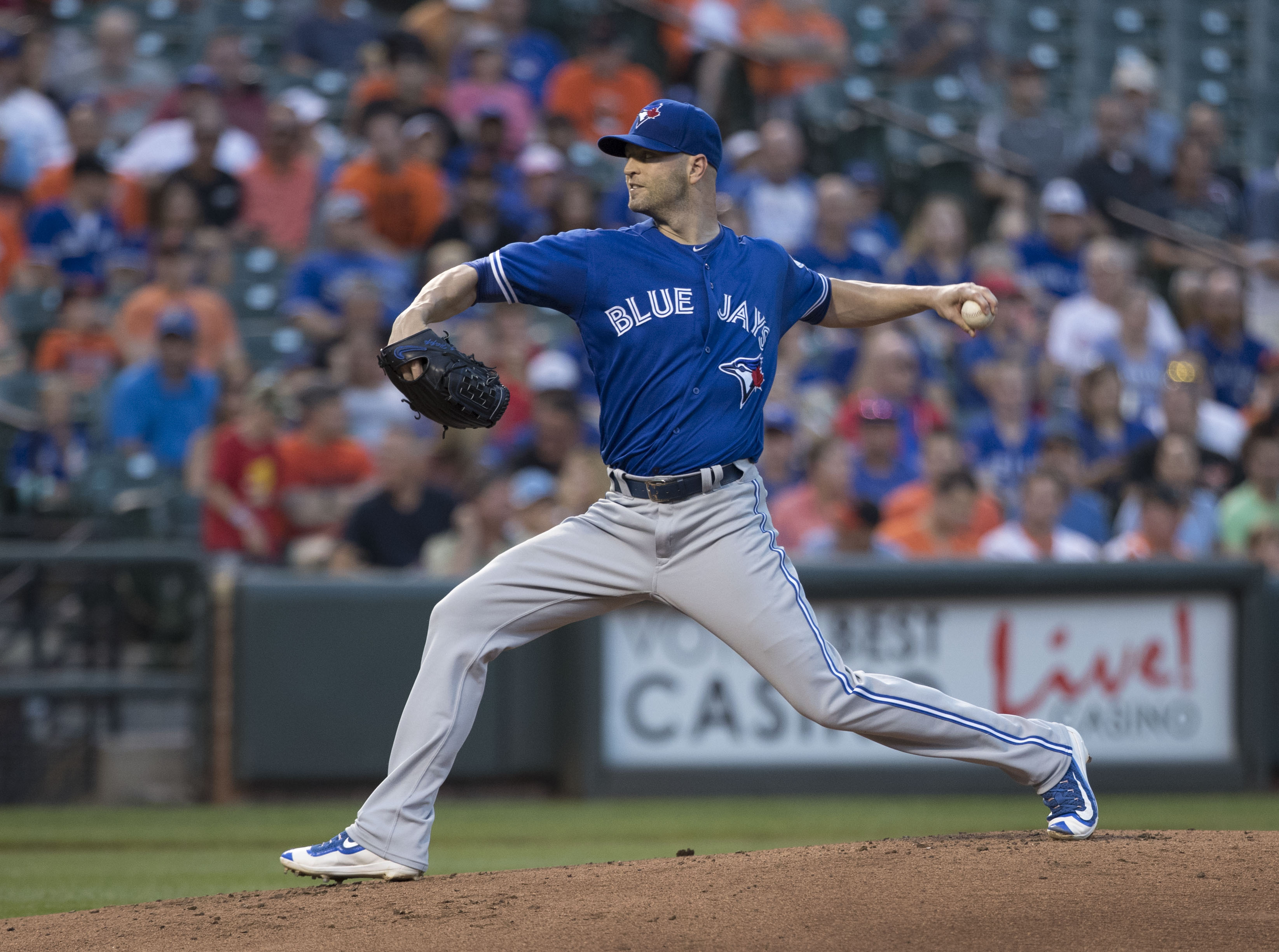
J. A. Happ became the sixth 20-game winner in franchise history on September 20.

After an off-day to begin September, the Blue Jays battled the Rays at Tropicana Field. As the Bluefield season ended on September 1, Devon Travis was able to be recalled without waiting ten days. In addition, the Blue Jays recalled Danny Barnes, Darrell Ceciliani, Dalton Pompey, and Ryan Tepera due to the September roster expansion, and added Matt Dermody to the roster. In the game against Tampa that night, the Rays took advantage of a shaky night for the Toronto pitching staff, taking the opener 8–3. Blake Snell held the Jays offence to a single run in the second game of the three-game series. The Blue Jays mounted a late-game comeback, scoring four runs in the ninth but fell short, losing 7–5. The loss moved Toronto into a tie with the Boston Red Sox, who defeated Oakland later that day, for the lead in the AL East. Toronto would avoid being swept by taking the third game by a score of 5–3, thanks in large part to 6 1/3 scoreless innings from the bullpen. Looking to rebound from another disappointing series in St. Petersburg, the Blue Jays took on the Yankees to close their road trip. R. A. Dickey allowed five runs in four innings pitched in the first game, giving the Yankees a 5–3 victory. Toronto held a 4–3 lead in the eighth inning before Jason Grilli yielded four runs to put the Jays down 7–4. The Blue Jays would battle back in the ninth, scoring two runs off Yankees closer Dellin Betances and loading the bases against his replacement, Blake Parker. Parker would end the game, getting Justin Smoak to flyout to the left field warning track and giving the Yankees a 7–6 win, which would be credited to relief pitcher Chasen Shreve. The Blue Jays would be swept for the first time on the road this season, losing the finale by a 2–0 score.

Coming home after a disappointing 3–6 road trip, the Blue Jays set their sights on the division-leading Red Sox. Marco Estrada continued to struggle, pitching just 2 2/3 innings and allowing four runs. The bullpen fared much worse, as Boston starter Rick Porcello became MLB's first 20-game winner of the 2016 season in a 13–3 Red Sox win. J. A. Happ held the high-powered Boston offence to two runs in six innings pitched in the second game, while Melvin Upton Jr. and José Bautista provided all the offence Toronto would need in a 3–2 win to break a four-game losing streak. Boston would take the final game of the three-game series, 11–8, giving Toronto three consecutive series losses. To end their six-game homestand, the Blue Jays took on Tampa for the last time in 2016. Ezequiel Carrera would hit a go-ahead, pinch hit solo home run in the eighth inning to give Toronto a 3–2 lead that they would not relinquish. The Rays pitching, as they had done several times in 2016, shut down the Blue Jays offence in the second game of the series, pitching to a 6–2 victory. In their final game against the Rays, the Blue Jays managed just two hits in an 8–1 loss that dropped their September record to a dismal 3–9. Josh Donaldson missed the entire series with a hip injury, and had an MRI during the final game.

In desperate need of wins, the Blue Jays began a west-coast road trip against the Los Angeles Angels. Josh Donaldson returned to the lineup and led the Jays to a 7–2 victory, with J. A. Happ picking up his 19th win of the season. R. A. Dickey, making possibly his final start as a Blue Jay, held the Angels scoreless over his five innings in Toronto's 5–0 win. The Angels would hold the Blue Jays to a single run in the third game, winning 6–1 and dropping the Jays to three games back of the division-leading Red Sox. Los Angeles would split the series, taking the fourth and final game 4–0. With the loss, Toronto fell four games back to Boston in the AL East. To close their road play on the west coast, the Blue Jays played a crucial series against the Seattle Mariners. Entering play, Toronto held the second wild-card spot, while the Mariners were two games back. With thousands of western Canadians making the trip to Seattle given Seattle's proximity to the Canadian border, Marco Estrada led the Jays to a 3–2 win in the first game. J. A. Happ became the sixth 20-game winner in Blue Jays franchise history in the second game of the series, winning 10–2. Russell Martin and Michael Saunders each hit home runs in the fourth inning to become the first Canadian teammates in MLB history to have 20 or more home runs in a season. The Mariners would avoid the sweep, taking the final game 2–1 in the twelfth inning. With the Orioles being swept by the Red Sox on Toronto's off day, the Jays moved into the first wild card position.

The Blue Jays returned to the Rogers Centre for their final homestand of the 2016 regular season; first by taking on the Yankees. The Toronto offence exploded in the first game, and Francisco Liriano had his best start as a Blue Jay, shutting out New York through his six innings in a 9–0 victory. The second game went tied 0–0 into the eighth inning, before José Bautista launched a three-run home run off Yankees reliever Tyler Clippard to lift Toronto to a 3–0 win. In the third game, Bautista hit a tie-breaking solo home run in the bottom of the eighth inning, giving the Blue Jays a 2–1 lead. In the ninth, the Yankees would score two runs off closer Roberto Osuna to take a 3–2 lead. With Tyler Clippard pitching for the second consecutive day, Ezequiel Carrera would tie the game with a perfectly executed safety squeeze before Edwin Encarnación hit a walk-off single to win 4–3. The final game was marred by two bench-clearing brawls in the second inning. Yankees starter Luis Severino hit Josh Donaldson on the elbow in the first inning, and J. A. Happ retaliated in the top of the second, first throwing behind Chase Headley and then hitting him on the hip. Home plate umpire Todd Tichenor issued a warning to both teams, and after the first uneventful brawl, Yankees manager Joe Girardi was ejected for arguing the warning. In the bottom half of the second, Severino threw behind Justin Smoak and then hit him, leading to the second brawl. Severino was immediately ejected, and after order had been restored Yankees pitching coach Larry Rothschild and bench coach Rob Thomson were also ejected. Toronto led 3–2 heading into the ninth inning, but New York would score five runs to take the lead. The Jays rally would fall short, as the Yankees avoided the sweep, 7–5. Holding the first wild-card position, the Blue Jays played their final regular season home series against Baltimore, who held the second wild-card spot entering play. Aaron Sanchez held the high-powered Orioles offence to a single run in the first game, striking out ten in a 5–1 victory. The Blue Jays would drop the second game, 3–2, despite taking a 2–1 lead into the ninth inning. With the Blue Jays loss, the Boston Red Sox clinched the division. Toronto was shut out in their final regular season home game, 4–0, and moved into a tie with Baltimore for the top wild-card position heading into the final weekend of the season.

Looking to ensure a postseason berth, the Blue Jays closed out the season by visiting the division-winning Boston Red Sox. Toronto lost the first game, 5–3, after Brett Cecil surrendered what would be David Ortiz's final regular-season home run. Baltimore also defeated New York, causing the Blue Jays to fall a game behind the Orioles for the top wild-card spot. The next day, Toronto defeated Boston, 4–3, thanks to a three-RBI night from Kevin Pillar. They also pulled back into a tie with Baltimore for the top wild-card after Baltimore lost to New York, enabling them to clinch the top wild-card spot with a win in the season finale. In the season finale, Aaron Sanchez carried a no-hitter into the seventh inning, and both Devon Travis and Troy Tulowitzki contributed with two-out hits, helping the Blue Jays win, 2–1. With Baltimore's win over New York, Toronto and Baltimore finished the season with identical 89–73 records; however, Toronto clinched the top wild-card spot based on their 10–9 head-to-head record against Baltimore in 2016.

=== Game log ===
Legend
Blue Jays win	Blue Jays loss	Game postponed

2016 Game Log
April: 11–14 (Home: 5–7; Road: 6–7)

#	Date	Opponent	Score	Win	Loss	Save	Attendance	Record	GB
1	April 3	@ Rays	5–3	Stroman (1–0)	Archer (0–1)	Osuna (1)	31,042	1–0	+½
2	April 4	@ Rays	5–3	Dickey (1–0)	Smyly (0–1)	Osuna (2)	15,116	2–0	+½
3	April 5	@ Rays	2–3	Colomé (1–0)	Cecil (0–1)	—	12,757	2–1	–
4	April 6	@ Rays	3–5	Ramírez (1–0)	Floyd (0–1)	—	14,257	2–2	1
5	April 8	Red Sox	7–8	Barnes (1–0)	Storen (0–1)	Kimbrel (1)	48,871	2–3	2½
6	April 9	Red Sox	4–8	Porcello (1–0)	Dickey (1–1)	—	47,138	2–4	3
7	April 10	Red Sox	3–0	Estrada (1–0)	Wright (0–1)	Osuna (3)	46,168	3–4	3
8	April 12	Yankees	2–3	Barbato (1–0)	Cecil (0–2)	Miller (2)	28,819	3–5	4½
9	April 13	Yankees	7–2	Happ (1–0)	Pineda (1–1)	—	27,938	4–5	3½
10	April 14	Yankees	4–2	Stroman (2–0)	Eovaldi (0–1)	Osuna (4)	36,238	5–5	2½
11	April 15	@ Red Sox	3–5	Porcello (2–0)	Dickey (1–2)	Kimbrel (3)	31,415	5–6	3½
12	April 16	@ Red Sox	2–4	Price (2–0)	Estrada (1–1)	Kimbrel (4)	36,267	5–7	3½
13	April 17	@ Red Sox	5–3	Sanchez (1–0)	Wright (0–2)	—	37,217	6–7	3
14	April 18	@ Red Sox	4–3	Happ (2–0)	Uehara (0–1)	Storen (1)	37,168	7–7	2½
15	April 19	@ Orioles	4–3	Stroman (3–0)	Wright (1–1)	Osuna (5)	16,783	8–7	1½
16	April 20	@ Orioles	3–4 (10)	Givens (1–0)	Biagini (0–1)	—	15,404	8–8	2½
17	April 21	@ Orioles	2–3	O'Day (1–0)	Cecil (0–3)	Britton (4)	17,644	8–9	3½
18	April 22	Athletics	5–8	Gray (3–1)	Sanchez (1–1)	Madson (7)	34,251	8–10	3½
19	April 23	Athletics	9–3	Happ (3–0)	Bassitt (0–1)	—	46,334	9–10	3½
20	April 24	Athletics	6–3	Hutchison (1–0)	Surkamp (0–2)	Osuna (6)	46,300	10–10	2½
21	April 25	White Sox	5–7	Putnam (1–0)	Cecil (0–4)	Robertson (8)	24,333	10–11	2½
22	April 26	White Sox	1–10	Sale (5–0)	Dickey (1–3)	—	23,726	10–12	2½
23	April 27	White Sox	0–4	Quintana (3–1)	Estrada (1–2)	—	28,759	10–13	3½
24	April 29	@ Rays	6–1	Sanchez (2–1)	Smyly (1–3)	—	13,679	11–13	4
25	April 30	@ Rays	3–4	Cedeño (2–0)	Cecil (0–5)	—	14,948	11–14	4

May: 17–12 (Home: 8–7; Road: 9–5)

#	Date	Opponent	Score	Win	Loss	Save	Attendance	Record	GB
26	May 1	@ Rays	5–1	Stroman (4–0)	Cedeño (2–1)	—	27,217	12–14	3½
27	May 2	Rangers	1–2	Barnette (1–1)	Floyd (0–2)	Tolleson (9)	25,323	12–15	4
28	May 3	Rangers	3–1 (10)	Biagini (1–1)	Klein (0–1)	—	24,437	13–15	3½
29	May 4	Rangers	4–3	Osuna (1–0)	Barnette (1–2)	—	25,229	14–15	3
30	May 5	Rangers	12–2	Happ (4–0)	Holland (3–2)	—	35,468	15–15	3
31	May 6	Dodgers	5–2	Floyd (1–2)	Blanton (2–2)	Storen (2)	42,304	16–15	2
32	May 7	Dodgers	2–6	Kershaw (4–1)	Dickey (1–4)	—	47,156	16–16	2½
33	May 8	Dodgers	2–4	Hatcher (3–3)	Storen (0–2)	Jansen (11)	46,665	16–17	3½
34	May 9	@ Giants	3–1	Sanchez (3–1)	Peavy (1–4)	Osuna (7)	41,256	17–17	3
35	May 10	@ Giants	4–0	Happ (5–0)	Cain (0–5)	Osuna (8)	41,464	18–17	3
36	May 11	@ Giants	4–5 (13)	Suárez (1–0)	Tepera (0–1)	—	41,372	18–18	4
37	May 13	@ Rangers	5–0	Dickey (2–4)	Pérez (1–3)	—	40,344	19–18	4½
38	May 14	@ Rangers	5–6 (10)	Barnette (3–2)	Floyd (1–3)	—	47,115	19–19	5½
39	May 15	@ Rangers	6–7	Bush (1–0)	Chavez (0–1)	Dyson (2)	41,327	19–20	5½
40	May 16	Rays	2–13	Smyly (2–4)	Happ (5–1)	—	26,516	19–21	6
41	May 17	Rays	2–12	Archer (3–4)	Stroman (4–1)	—	27,521	19–22	6
42	May 18	Rays	3–6	Odorizzi (1–2)	Dickey (2–5)	Colomé (10)	29,078	19–23	7
43	May 19	@ Twins	3–2 (11)	Osuna (2–0)	Pressly (1–3)	Biagini (1)	25,435	20–23	6
44	May 20	@ Twins	9–3	Sanchez (4–1)	Duffey (1–3)	—	29,396	21–23	6
45	May 21	@ Twins	3–5	Abad (1–0)	Happ (5–2)	Jepsen (3)	30,460	21–24	7
46	May 22	@ Twins	3–1	Stroman (5–1)	Hughes (1–7)	Osuna (9)	33,421	22–24	6
47	May 24	@ Yankees	0–6	Eovaldi (5–2)	Dickey (2–6)	—	35,174	22–25	7
48	May 25	@ Yankees	8–4	Estrada (2–2)	Nova (3–2)	—	38,959	23–25	7
49	May 26	@ Yankees	3–1	Happ (6–2)	Sabathia (3–3)	Osuna (10)	38,391	24–25	6
50	May 27	Red Sox	7–5	Biagini (2–1)	Uehara (2–2)	Osuna (11)	46,470	25–25	5
51	May 28	Red Sox	10–9	Floyd (2–3)	Kimbrel (0–2)	—	48,154	26–25	4
52	May 29	Red Sox	3–5 (11)	Buchholz (3–5)	Floyd (2–4)	Uehara (1)	47,916	26–26	5
53	May 30	Yankees	4–2	Estrada (3–2)	Nova (3–3)	Storen (3)	32,921	27–26	5
54	May 31	Yankees	4–1	Biagini (3–1)	Sabathia (3–4)	Osuna (12)	33,419	28–26	5

June: 15–12 (Home: 6–4; Road: 9–8)

#	Date	Opponent	Score	Win	Loss.	Save	Attendance	Record	GB
55	June 1	Yankees	7–0	Sanchez (5–1)	Tanaka (3–1)	—	39,512	29–26	4
56	June 3	@ Red Sox	5–2	Dickey (3–6)	Price (7–2)	Osuna (13)	37,129	30–26	2½
57	June 4	@ Red Sox	4–6	Wright (6–4)	Stroman (5–2)	Kimbrel (13)	37,762	30–27	3½
58	June 5	@ Red Sox	5–4	Estrada (4–2)	Rodríguez (1–1)	—	35,823	31–27	2½
59	June 6	@ Tigers	0–11	Fulmer (6–1)	Happ (6–3)	—	29,771	31–28	3½
60	June 7	@ Tigers	2–3 (10)	Wilson (2–1)	Biagini (3–2)	—	30,745	31–29	4½
61	June 8	@ Tigers	7–2	Dickey (4–6)	Zimmermann (8–3)	—	36,036	32–29	4½
62	June 9	Orioles	5–6	Bundy (2–1)	Osuna (2–1)	Britton (19)	41,448	32–30	5½
63	June 10	Orioles	4–3 (10)	Storen (1–2)	Brach (5–1)	—	44,439	33–30	4½
64	June 11	Orioles	11–6	Happ (7–3)	McFarland (1–2)	—	47,651	34–30	3½
65	June 12	Orioles	10–9	Sanchez (6–1)	Jiménez (3–7)	Grilli (3) (Note: 1 save with Toronto)	47,249	35–30	2½
66	June 13	Phillies	0–7	Eickhoff (4–8)	Dickey (4–7)	—	35,678	35–31	3
67	June 14	Phillies	11–3	Stroman (6–2)	Eflin (0–1)	—	47,066	36–31	3
68	June 15	@ Phillies	7–2	Estrada (5–2)	Hellickson (4–5)	—	24,753	37–31	2
69	June 16	@ Philles	13–2	Happ (8–3)	Nola (5–6)	—	22,279	38–31	2
70	June 17	@ Orioles	13–3	Sanchez (7–1)	Wright (3–4)	—	38,306	39–31	1
71	June 18	@ Orioles	2–4	Gallardo (2–1)	Dickey (4–8)	Britton (21)	41,901	39–32	2
72	June 19	@ Orioles	6–11	Tillman (10–1)	Stroman (6–3)	—	39,024	39–33	3
73	June 21	Diamondbacks	2–4	Corbin (4–6)	Estrada (5–3)	Hudson (1)	41,838	39–34	2½
74	June 22	Diamondbacks	5–2	Happ (9–3)	Ray (4–6)	Osuna (14)	46,967	40–34	2½
75	June 24	@ White Sox	2–3	Jones (3–2)	Chavez (0–2)	Robertson (19)	27,196	40–35	3½
76	June 25	@ White Sox	10–8	Dickey (5–8)	González (1–3)	Osuna (15)	25,776	41–35	4
77	June 26	@ White Sox	2–5	Sale (13–2)	Stroman (6–4)	Robertson (20)	28,345	41–36	5
78	June 27	@ Rockies	5–9	Gray (5–3)	Storen (1–3)	—	36,419	41–37	5½
79	June 28	@ Rockies	14–9	Happ (10–3)	Butler (2–5)		33,917	42–37	5½
80	June 29	@ Rockies	5–3	Sanchez (8–1)	Anderson (0–2)	—	38,412	43–37	5½
81	June 30	Indians	1–4	Carrasco (4–2)	Dickey (5–9)	Allen (17)	41,365	43–38	5½

July: 16–8 (Home: 13–6; Road: 3–2)

#	Date	Opponent	Score	Win	Loss	Save	Attendance	Record	GB
82	July 1	Indians	1–2 (19)	Bauer (7–2)	Barney (0–1)	—	45,825	43–39	5½
83	July 2	Indians	9–6	Grilli (2–2) (Note: 1–0 with Toronto)	Otero (2–1)	Osuna (16)	46,197	44–39	4½
84	July 3	Indians	17–1	Happ (11–3)	Kluber (8–8)	—	45,962	45–39	3½
85	July 4	Royals	6–2	Sanchez (9–1)	Vólquez (7–8)	—	36,438	46–39	2½
86	July 5	Royals	8–3	Dickey (6–9)	Young (2–8)	—	35,917	47–39	2½
87	July 6	Royals	4–2	Stroman (7–4)	Herrera (1–2)	Osuna (17)	39,971	48–39	2½
88	July 7	Tigers	5–4	Grilli (3–2) (Note: 2–0 with Toronto)	Wilson (2–2)	Osuna (18)	46,283	49–39	2
89	July 8	Tigers	6–0	Happ (12–3)	Pelfrey (2–8)	—	43,228	50–39	1
90	July 9	Tigers	2–3	Rondón (3–1)	Grilli (3–3) (Note: 2–1 with Toronto)	Rodríguez (24)	47,684	50–40	2
91	July 10	Tigers	6–1	Dickey (7–9)	Sánchez (5–10)	—	47,747	51–40	2
92	July 15	@ Athletics	7–8	Dull (3–2)	Cecil (0–6)	Madson (18)	19,192	51–41	3
93	July 16	@ Athletics	4–5	Gray (4–8)	Dickey (7–10)	Madson (19)	27,510	51–42	4
94	July 17	@ Athletics	5–3	Grilli (4–3) (Note: 3–1 with Toronto)	Axford (3–3)	Osuna (19)	21,626	52–42	3
95	July 19	@ Diamondbacks	5–1	Sanchez (10–1)	Godley (2–1)	—	26,626	53–42	1½
96	July 20	@ Diamondbacks	10–4	Stroman (8–4)	Corbin (4–9)	—	20,076	54–42	1
97	July 22	Mariners	1–2	Paxton (3–4)	Estrada (5–4)	Cishek (23)	46,737	54–43	2
98	July 23	Mariners	5–14	Iwakuma (11–6)	Dickey (7–11)	LeBlanc (1)	47,517	54–44	3
99	July 24	Mariners	2–0	Happ (13–3)	Miley (6–8)	Osuna (20)	47,488	55–44	3
100	July 25	Padres	4–2	Sanchez (11–1)	Rea (5–5)	Osuna (21)	41,483	56–44	3
101	July 26	Padres	7–6 (12)	Chavez (1–2)	Villanueva (1–2)	—	45,515	57–44	2
102	July 27	Padres	4–8	Perdomo (5–4)	Dickey (7–12)	—	47,301	57–45	2
103	July 29	Orioles	6–5	Estrada (6–4)	Gausman (2–8)	Osuna (22)	46,112	58–45	½
104	July 30	Orioles	9–1	Happ (14–3)	Gallardo (3–3)	—	47,305	59–45	+½
105	July 31	Orioles	2–6 (12)	Givens (8–1)	Morales (0–1)	—	46,792	59–46	½

August: 17–11 (Home: 8–4; Road: 9–7)

#	Date	Opponent	Score	Win	Loss	Save	Attendance	Record	GB
106	August 1	@ Astros	1–2 (14)	Feliz (7–1)	Feldman (5–4) (Note: 0–1 with Toronto)	—	20,623	59–47	1
107	August 2	@ Astros	2–1	Dickey (8–12)	McCullers Jr. (6–5)	Grilli (4) (Note: 2 saves with Toronto)	24,399	60–47	1
108	August 3	@ Astros	3–1	Estrada (7–4)	McHugh (7–8)	Osuna (23)	29,399	61–47	1
109	August 4	@ Astros	4–1	Happ (15–3)	Fiers (7–5)	Osuna (24)	23,190	62–47	–
110	August 5	@ Royals	4–3	Cecil (1–6)	Herrera (1–3)	Benoit (1)	31,831	63–47	–
111	August 6	@ Royals	2–4	Duffy (8–1)	Sanchez (11–2)	Herrera (4)	35,986	63–48	–
112	August 7	@ Royals	1–7	Ventura (7–9)	Stroman (8–5)	—	25,830	63–49	1
113	August 8	Rays	7–5	Benoit (2–1) (Note: 1–0 with Toronto)	Cedeño (3–4)	Osuna (25)	43,812	64–49	–
114	August 9	Rays	2–9	Smyly (4–11)	Estrada (7–5)	Ramírez (1)	43,134	64–50	–
115	August 10	Rays	7–0	Happ (16–3)	Snell (3–5)	—	45,501	65–50	+1
116	August 12	Astros	3–5	Musgrove (1–0)	Liriano (6–12) (Note: 0–1 with Toronto)	Harris (12)	46,330	65–51	½
117	August 13	Astros	4–2	Sanchez (12–2)	McHugh (7–10)	Osuna (26)	47,505	66–51	+½
118	August 14	Astros	9–2	Stroman (9–5)	Fiers (8–6)	—	47,261	67–51	+½
119	August 15	@ Yankees	0–1	Green (2–2)	Dickey (8–13)	Betances (5)	36,015	67–52	–
120	August 16	@ Yankees	12–6	Feldman (6–4) (Note: 1–1 with Toronto)	Warren (4–3)	—	31,874	68–52	+1
121	August 17	@ Yankees	7–4	Happ (17–3)	Sabathia (7–10)	Osuna (27)	37,736	69–52	+1
122	August 19	@ Indians	2–3	Manship (2–1)	Osuna (2–2)	—	30,665	69–53	+½
123	August 20	@ Indians	6–5	Biagini (4–2)	Tomlin (11–7)	Osuna (28)	33,604	70–53	+½
124	August 21	@ Indians	2–3	Clevinger (2–1)	Cecil (1–7)	Allen (24)	26,696	70–54	+½
125	August 23	Angels	7–2	Dickey (9–13)	Skaggs (1–3)	—	46,696	71–54	–
126	August 24	Angels	2–8	Shoemaker (8–13)	Estrada (7–6)	—	44,404	71–55	–
127	August 25	Angels	3–6	Weaver (9–11)	Happ (17–4)	—	46,273	71–56	–
128	August 26	Twins	15–8	Liriano (7–12) (Note: 1–1 with Toronto)	Dean (1–4)	—	42,534	72–56	+1
129	August 27	Twins	8–7	Grilli (5–3) (Note: 4–1 with Toronto)	Pressly (6–6)	Osuna (29)	47,485	73–56	+1
130	August 28	Twins	9–6	Feldman (7–4) (Note: 2–1 with Toronto)	Light (0–1)	—	47,444	74–56	+2
131	August 29	@ Orioles	5–1	Estrada (8–6)	Miley (8–11)	—	15,532	75–56	+2
132	August 30	@ Orioles	3–5	Brach (8–2)	Grilli (5–4) (Note: 4–2 with Toronto)	Britton (39)	16,083	75–57	+2
133	August 31	@ Orioles	5–3	Sanchez (13–2)	Gallardo (4–7)	—	16,161	76–57	+2

September: 11–16 (Home: 6–7; Road: 5–9)

#	Date	Opponent	Score	Win	Loss	Save	Attendance	Record	GB
134	September 2	@ Rays	3–8	Farquhar (1–0)	Stroman (9–6)	—	12,602	76–58	+1
135	September 3	@ Rays	5–7	Snell (5–7)	Estrada (8–7)	Colomé (30)	14,353	76–59	–
136	September 4	@ Rays	5–3	Benoit (3–1) (Note: 2–0 with Toronto)	Jepsen (2–6)	Osuna (30)	13,884	77–59	+1
137	September 5	@ Yankees	3–5	Tanaka (12–4)	Dickey (9–14)	Betances (9)	42,141	77–60	+1
138	September 6	@ Yankees	6–7	Shreve (2–1)	Grilli (5–5) (Note: 4–3 with Toronto)	Parker (1)	27,532	77–61	–
139	September 7	@ Yankees	0–2	Mitchell (1–0)	Stroman (9–7)	Clippard (2)	30,501	77–62	1
140	September 9	Red Sox	3–13	Porcello (20–3)	Estrada (8–8)	—	46,953	77–63	2
141	September 10	Red Sox	3–2	Happ (18–4)	Rodríguez (2–7)	Osuna (31)	47,829	78–63	1
142	September 11	Red Sox	8–11	Ross Jr. (3–2)	Schultz (0–1)	Kimbrel (25)	47,816	78–64	2
143	September 12	Rays	3–2	Grilli (6–5) (Note: 5–3 with Toronto)	Boxberger (3–1)	Osuna (32)	35,333	79–64	2
144	September 13	Rays	2–6	Smyly (7–11)	Stroman (9–8)	—	38,338	79–65	2
145	September 14	Rays	1–8	Cobb (1–0)	Estrada (8–9)	—	41,001	79–66	2
146	September 15	@ Angels	7–2	Happ (19–4)	Wright (0–3)	—	37,559	80–66	2
147	September 16	@ Angels	5–0	Dickey (10–14)	Weaver (11–12)	Osuna (33)	42,159	81–66	2
148	September 17	@ Angels	1–6	Nolasco (6–14)	Liriano (7–13) (Note: 1–2 with Toronto)	—	39,195	81–67	3
149	September 18	@ Angels	0–4	Meyer (1–3)	Stroman (9–9)	—	36,270	81–68	4
150	September 19	@ Mariners	3–2	Estrada (8–9)	Walker (6–11)	Osuna (34)	34,809	82–68	4
151	September 20	@ Mariners	10–2	Happ (20–4)	Iwakuma (16–12)	—	33,573	83–68	4
152	September 21	@ Mariners	1–2 (12)	Vincent (4–4)	Dickey (10–15)	—	39,595	83–69	5
153	September 23	Yankees	9–0	Liriano (8–13) (Note: 2–2 with Toronto)	Mitchell (1–2)	—	47,016	84–69	5½
154	September 24	Yankees	3–0	Grilli (7–5) (Note: 6–3 with Toronto)	Clippard (3–5)	Osuna (35)	47,828	85–69	5½
155	September 25	Yankees	4–3	Osuna (3–2)	Clippard (3–6)	—	47,896	86–69	5½
156	September 26	Yankees	5–7	Warren (7–4)	Grilli (7–6) (Note: 6–4 with Toronto)	Layne (1)	44,532	86–70	6
157	September 27	Orioles	5–1	Sanchez (14–2)	Gausman (8–12)	—	44,762	87–70	5
158	September 28	Orioles	2–3	Duensing (1–0)	Osuna (3–3)	Britton (47)	44,668	87–71	5
159	September 29	Orioles	0–4	Jiménez (8–12)	Stroman (9–10)	—	47,791	87–72	5
160	September 30	@ Red Sox	3–5	Ziegler (4–6)	Biagini (4–3)	Kimbrel (31)	37,661	87–73	6

October: 2–0 (Home: 0–0; Road: 2–0)

#	Date	Opponent	Score	Win	Loss	Save	Attendance	Record	GB
161	October 1	@ Red Sox	4–3	Osuna (4–3)	Kimbrel (2–6)	—	37,396	88–73	5
162	October 2	@ Red Sox	2–1	Sanchez (15–2)	Ziegler (4–7)	Osuna (36)	36,787	89–73	4

== Postseason ==
=== American League Wild Card Game ===
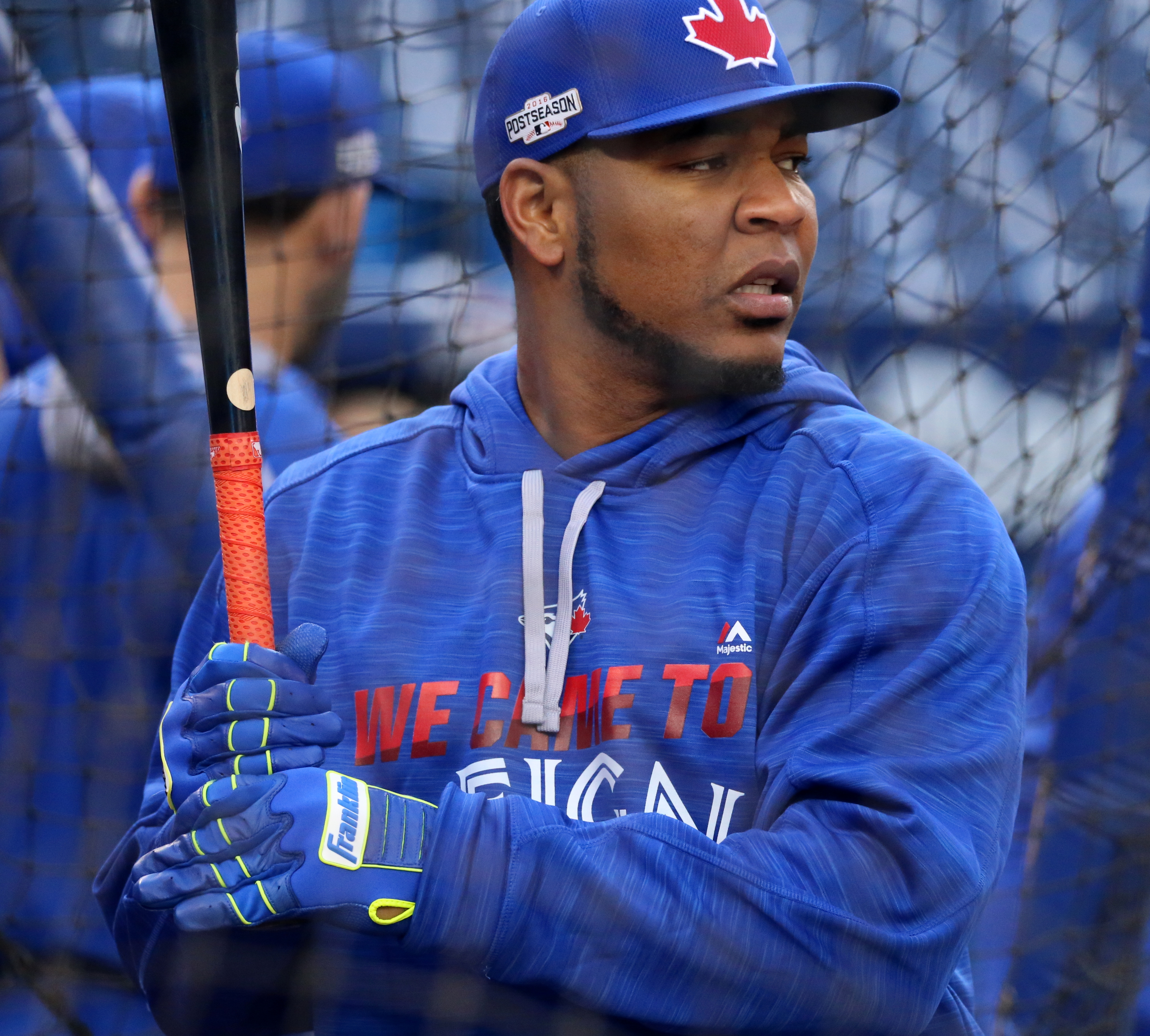
Edwin Encarnación takes batting practice before the Wild Card Game

On October 4, the Toronto Blue Jays hosted the Baltimore Orioles at the Rogers Centre in the American League Wild Card Game. The starters, Marcus Stroman for the Blue Jays and Chris Tillman for the Orioles, were announced on October 3. In the bottom of the second inning, José Bautista hit a solo home run to give Toronto a 1–0 lead. American League home run leader Mark Trumbo hit a two-run home run in the top of the fourth inning to give Baltimore a 2–1 lead. Ezequiel Carrera singled in a run in the fifth inning to tie the game at 2–2. In the seventh inning, Melvin Upton Jr. pinch-hit for Michael Saunders and flew out to Hyun-soo Kim in left field. A person in the outfield seats, later identified by Toronto police as Kenneth Pagan, threw a beer can in the direction of Kim, landing several feet away and causing the game to be briefly delayed while police searched for the perpetrator. Pagan, a 41-year-old copy editor for Postmedia Network from Hamilton, Ontario, was later charged with mischief after surrendering himself to Toronto police amid the publication of his face from Rogers Centre security footage. With the game still tied, Roberto Osuna came in to pitch the ninth and tenth innings, but left after recording an out in the tenth with minor shoulder tightness. With one out in the bottom of the eleventh, Orioles manager Buck Showalter elected to use Ubaldo Jiménez in relief, still having Cy Young Award candidate Zach Britton available. Jiménez allowed a single to Devon Travis, followed by a single by Josh Donaldson which was misplayed by outfielder Nolan Reimold, allowing Travis to advance to third base. With the winning run 90 feet away, Edwin Encarnación hit a walk-off, three-run home run on the first pitch to give the Blue Jays a 5–2 victory and send them to the American League Division Series.

Encarnación became only the fourth player to end a winner-take-all postseason game with a walk-off home run, joining Bill Mazeroski (1960 World Series), Chris Chambliss (1976 ALCS) and Aaron Boone (2003 ALCS).

=== American League Division Series ===
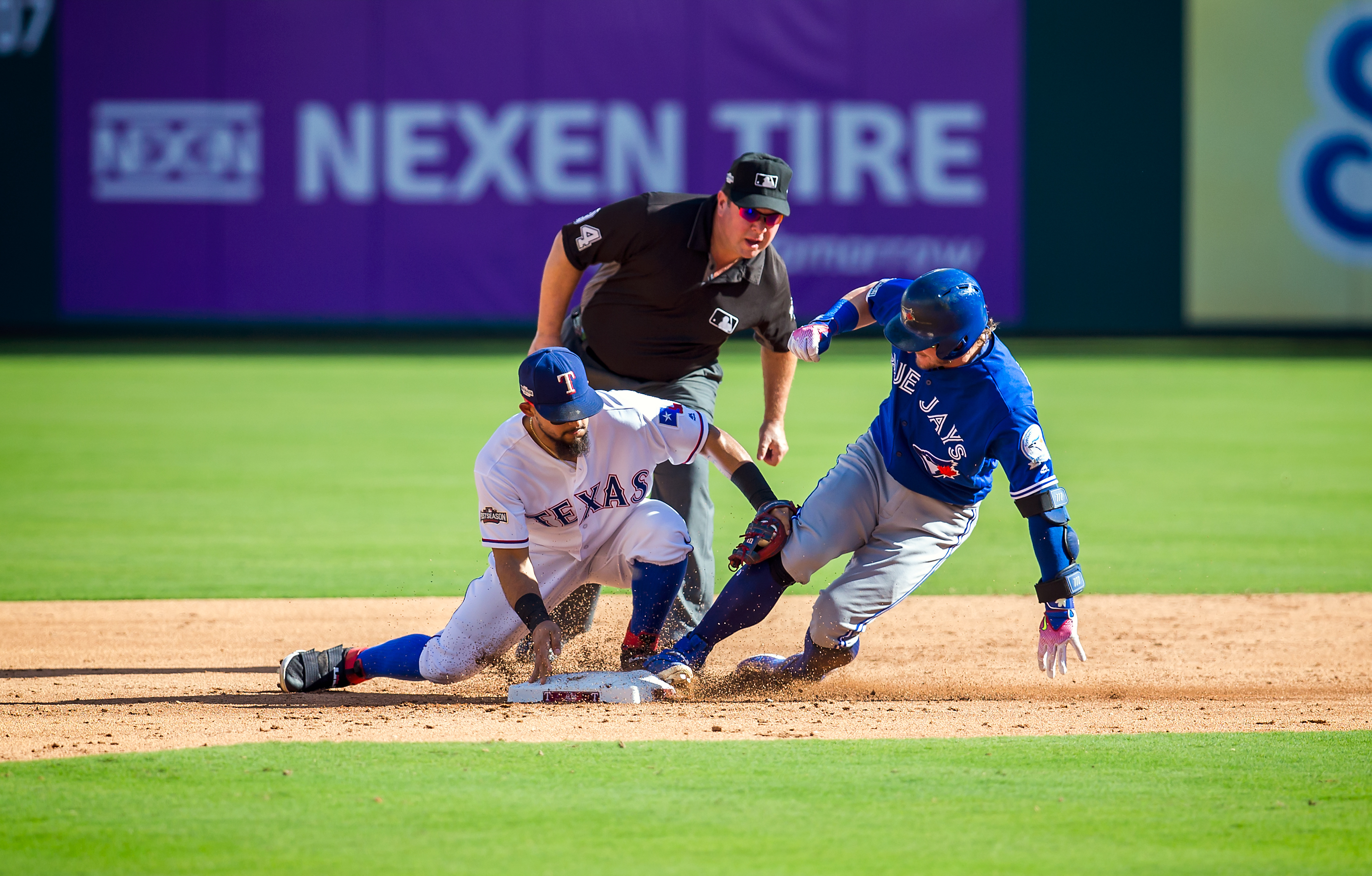
Josh Donaldson slides into second base during the first game of the ALDS

In a rematch of last year's Division Series, the Blue Jays took on the Texas Rangers in the 2016 ALDS. The Blue Jays took an early 5–0 lead in the third inning of the first game, thanks to RBI hits from Josh Donaldson and José Bautista and a three-run triple by Troy Tulowitzki. In the fourth, Toronto added two runs on a solo home run by Melvin Upton Jr. and a Donaldson single to take a 7–0 lead. Bautista hit a three-run home run in the ninth inning to give the Jays a 10–0 lead. Marco Estrada pitched a gem, going 8 1/3 innings and allowing just four hits and one run in the bottom of the ninth to take the win, 10–1.

J. A. Happ got the start for the Blue Jays in game two, while Yu Darvish started for the Rangers. Each starter went five innings, with Happ allowing just a single run on nine hits and Darvish allowing five runs on home runs by Troy Tulowitzki, Kevin Pillar, Ezequiel Carrera, and Edwin Encarnación. In the eighth inning, Carlos Gómez hit an RBI single that struck Francisco Liriano near the back of the head. Roberto Osuna came on and closed out the game, 5–3, with a five-out save. The Blue Jays took a 2–0 series lead with the win, heading back to Toronto.

With the series moving to the Rogers Centre, the Blue Jays sought to eliminate the Rangers from the postseason for the second consecutive season. Aaron Sanchez got the start for the Jays, while the Rangers started Colby Lewis. Lewis lasted only two innings, yielding five earned runs on five hits including home runs by Edwin Encarnación and Russell Martin. Sanchez would go 5 2/3 innings, but was responsible for six earned runs after Joe Biagini allowed a two-run double by Mitch Moreland. The Blue Jays would tie the game in the bottom of the sixth inning, after a passed ball scored Troy Tulowitzki. With the game tied 6–6 in the tenth inning, Russell Martin hit a ground ball to shortstop Elvis Andrus. Rougned Odor was unable to turn the double play, throwing wide of first base. Moreland bobbled the ball, which allowed Josh Donaldson to score the winning run and sweep Texas out of the playoffs, 7–6.

=== American League Championship Series ===
Toronto advanced to the ALCS for the second consecutive year, and took on the Cleveland Indians, who swept the Boston Red Sox in the other half of the ALDS. On October 11, the Blue Jays named Marco Estrada their starter for the first game of the best-of-seven series. The following day, the Indians announced that Corey Kluber would start Game 1. Kluber and the Indians' bullpen would combine to shutout the Blue Jays, winning 2–0. Losing 2–1 in the second game of the series, the Blue Jays bats were silenced once again by reliever Andrew Miller, who struck out another five batters in two innings. Cody Allen closed the game and gave the Indians a 2–0 series lead heading to Toronto.

Trevor Bauer, who had to be scratched from his scheduled Game 2 start due to a finger injury suffered while repairing a toy drone, started for Cleveland in Game 3. The Blue Jays turned to Marcus Stroman, who had not pitched since the Wild Card Game. Bauer was forced to leave in the first inning after the cut on his little finger opened and bled profusely. While Stroman would allow four runs in 5 1/3 innings, the Cleveland bullpen would combine to pitch 8 1/3 and allow just two runs to take the third game of the series, 4–2, and a commanding 3–0 series lead. The Blue Jays would avoid being swept out of the ALCS, with Aaron Sanchez allowing one run on two hits over six innings pitched in a 5–1 victory. The playoffs would end for Toronto in Game 5, as the Indians advanced to the World Series with a 3–0 win.

=== Postseason game log ===
Legend
Blue Jays win	Blue Jays loss	Game postponed

2016 Postseason Game Log
American League Wild Card Game: 1–0

#	Date	Opponent	Score	Win	Loss	Save	Attendance	Series
1	October 4	Orioles	5–2 (11)	Liriano (1–0)	Jiménez (0–1)	—	49,934	1–0

American League Division Series: 3–0

#	Date	Opponent	Score	Win	Loss	Save	Attendance	Series
1	October 6	@ Rangers	10–1	Estrada (1–0)	Hamels (0–1)	—	47,434	1–0
2	October 7	@ Rangers	5–3	Happ (1–0)	Darvish (0–1)	Osuna (1)	48,019	2–0
3	October 9	Rangers	7–6 (10)	Osuna (1–0)	Bush (0–1)	—	49,555	3–0

American League Championship Series: 1–4

#	Date	Opponent	Score	Win	Loss	Save	Attendance	Series
1	October 14	@ Indians	0–2	Kluber (1–0)	Estrada (0–1)	Allen (1)	37,727	0–1
2	October 15	@ Indians	1–2	Tomlin (1–0)	Happ (0–1)	Allen (2)	37,870	0–2
3	October 17	Indians	2–4	Shaw (1–0)	Stroman (0–1)	Miller (1)	49,507	0–3
4	October 18	Indians	5–1	Sanchez (1–0)	Kluber (1–1)	—	49,142	1–3
5	October 19	Indians	0–3	Shaw (2–0)	Estrada (0–2)	Allen (3)	48,800	1–4

=== Postseason rosters ===
Playoff rosters
American League Wild Card Game

- Pitchers: 6 Marcus Stroman 25 Marco Estrada 27 Brett Cecil 31 Joe Biagini 37 Jason Grilli 45 Francisco Liriano 46 Scott Feldman 52 Ryan Tepera 54 Roberto Osuna 62 Aaron Loup
- Catchers: 30 Dioner Navarro 55 Russell Martin
- Infielders: 2 Troy Tulowitzki 14 Justin Smoak 17 Ryan Goins 18 Darwin Barney 20 Josh Donaldson 29 Devon Travis
- Outfielders: 3 Ezequiel Carrera 7 Melvin Upton Jr. 11 Kevin Pillar 19 José Bautista 21 Michael Saunders 23 Dalton Pompey
- Designated hitters: 10 Edwin Encarnación

American League Division Series

- Pitchers: 6 Marcus Stroman 24 Danny Barnes (Game 3) 25 Marco Estrada 27 Brett Cecil 31 Joe Biagini 34 J. A. Happ 37 Jason Grilli 41 Aaron Sanchez 45 Francisco Liriano (games 1–2) 46 Scott Feldman 52 Ryan Tepera 54 Roberto Osuna 62 Aaron Loup
- Catchers: 30 Dioner Navarro 55 Russell Martin
- Infielders: 2 Troy Tulowitzki 14 Justin Smoak 18 Darwin Barney 20 Josh Donaldson 29 Devon Travis
- Outfielders: 3 Ezequiel Carrera 7 Melvin Upton Jr. 11 Kevin Pillar 19 José Bautista 21 Michael Saunders
- Designated hitters: 10 Edwin Encarnación

American League Championship Series

- Pitchers: 6 Marcus Stroman 25 Marco Estrada 27 Brett Cecil 31 Joe Biagini 34 J. A. Happ 37 Jason Grilli 41 Aaron Sanchez 45 Francisco Liriano 52 Ryan Tepera 54 Roberto Osuna 62 Aaron Loup
- Catchers: 30 Dioner Navarro 55 Russell Martin
- Infielders: 2 Troy Tulowitzki 14 Justin Smoak (games 2–5) 17 Ryan Goins 18 Darwin Barney 20 Josh Donaldson 29 Devon Travis (Game 1)
- Outfielders: 3 Ezequiel Carrera 7 Melvin Upton Jr. 11 Kevin Pillar 19 José Bautista 21 Michael Saunders 23 Dalton Pompey
- Designated hitters: 10 Edwin Encarnación

== Roster ==
2016 Toronto Blue Jays
Roster
Pitchers: 46 Dustin Antolin; 24,30 Danny Barnes; 53 Joaquín Benoit; 31 Joe Biagini; 27 Brett Cecil; 30 Jesse Chavez; 50 Matt Dermody; 32 Scott Diamond; 43 R. A. Dickey; 25 Marco Estrada; 46 Scott Feldman; 39 Gavin Floyd; 57 Chad Girodo; 37 Jason Grilli; 33 J. A. Happ; 36 Drew Hutchison; 68 Arnold León; 45 Francisco Liriano; 62 Aaron Loup; 56 Franklin Morales; 54 Roberto Osuna; 41 Aaron Sanchez; 47 Bo Schultz; 45 Drew Storen; 6 Marcus Stroman; 52 Ryan Tepera; 44 Pat Venditte	Catchers: 55 Russell Martin; 30 Dioner Navarro; 22 Josh Thole; Infielders: 18 Darwin Barney; 1 Andy Burns; 15 Chris Colabello; 28 Matt Dominguez; 20 Josh Donaldson; 10 Edwin Encarnación; 17 Ryan Goins; 37 Jimmy Paredes; 14 Justin Smoak; 29 Devon Travis; 2 Troy Tulowitzki	Outfielders: 19 José Bautista; 3 Ezequiel Carrera; 9 Darrell Ceciliani; 48 Junior Lake; 11 Kevin Pillar; 23 Dalton Pompey; 21 Michael Saunders; 7 Melvin Upton Jr.	Manager: 5 John Gibbons; Coaches: 61 Alex Andreopoulos (bullpen catcher); 16 DeMarlo Hale (bench); 26 Brook Jacoby (hitting); 38 Dane Johnson (bullpen); 34 Tim Leiper (first base); 60 Eric Owens (assistant hitting); 63 Jason Phillips (bullpen catcher); 4 Luis Rivera (third base); 40 Pete Walker (pitching)

== Statistics ==
=== Batting ===
Note: G = Games played; AB = At bats; R = Runs scored; H = Hits; 2B = Doubles; 3B = Triples; HR = Home runs; RBI = Runs batted in; SB = Stolen bases; BB = Walks; AVG = Batting average; Ref. = Reference

Player	G	AB	R	H	2B	3B	HR	RBI	SB	BB	AVG	Ref.
Darwin Barney	104	279	35	75	13	2	4	19	2	22	.269	
José Bautista	116	423	68	99	24	1	22	69	2	87	.234	
Andy Burns	10	6	2	0	0	0	0	0	0	0	.000	
Ezequiel Carrera	110	270	47	67	9	1	6	23	7	27	.248	
Darrell Ceciliani	13	27	2	3	2	0	0	1	0	1	.111	
Chris Colabello	10	29	0	2	0	0	0	1	0	2	.069	
R. A. Dickey	30	1	0	0	0	0	0	0	0	0	.000	
Matt Dominguez	5	11	0	0	0	0	0	0	0	1	.000	
Josh Donaldson	155	577	122	164	32	5	37	99	7	109	.284	
Edwin Encarnación	160	601	99	158	33	0	42	127	2	87	.263	
Marco Estrada	27	5	0	0	0	0	0	0	0	0	.000	
Gavin Floyd	28	1	0	0	0	0	0	0	0	0	.000	
Ryan Goins	76	183	13	34	9	2	3	12	1	9	.186	
J. A. Happ	31	7	2	2	0	0	0	0	0	0	.286	
Junior Lake	22	35	5	7	3	0	1	2	1	4	.200	
Russell Martin	137	455	62	105	16	0	20	74	1	64	.231	
Dioner Navarro	16	33	1	6	0	0	0	3	0	3	.182	
Jimmy Paredes	7	15	2	4	1	0	1	2	0	2	.267	
Kevin Pillar	146	548	59	146	35	2	7	53	14	24	.266	
Dalton Pompey	8	2	3	0	0	0	0	0	2	0	.000	
Aaron Sanchez	30	9	0	0	0	0	0	0	0	1	.000	
Michael Saunders	140	490	70	124	32	3	24	57	1	59	.253	
Justin Smoak	125	295	33	65	10	0	14	34	1	40	.220	
Marcus Stroman	32	5	1	0	0	0	0	0	0	0	.000	
Josh Thole	50	118	7	20	3	0	1	7	0	13	.169	
Devon Travis	101	410	54	123	28	1	11	50	4	20	.300	
Troy Tulowitzki	131	492	54	125	21	0	24	79	1	43	.254	
Melvin Upton, Jr.	57	148	18	29	4	1	4	16	7	14	.196	
Team totals	162	5479	759	1358	276	18	221	728	54	632	.248	

=== Pitching ===
Note: G = Games pitched; GS = Games started; W = Wins; L = Losses; SV = Saves; ERA = Earned run average; WHIP = Walks + hits per inning pitched; IP = Innings pitched; H = Hits allowed; R = Total runs allowed; ER = Earned runs allowed; BB = Walks allowed; K = Strikeouts; Ref. = Reference

Player	G	GS	W	L	SV	ERA	WHIP	IP	H	R	ER	BB	K	Ref.
Dustin Antolin	1	0	0	0	0	13.50	2.50	2	4	3	3	1	1	
Danny Barnes	12	0	0	0	0	3.95	1.39	13 2/3	14	6	6	5	14	
Darwin Barney	1	0	0	1	0	9.00	1.00	1	1	1	1	0	1	
Joaquín Benoit	25	0	2	0	1	0.38	1.10	23 2/3	17	1	1	9	24	
Joe Biagini	60	0	4	3	1	3.06	1.30	67 2/3	69	28	23	19	62	
Brett Cecil	54	0	1	7	0	3.93	1.28	36 2/3	39	17	16	8	45	
Jesse Chavez	39	0	1	2	0	4.57	1.28	41 1/3	43	22	21	10	42	
Matt Dermody	5	0	0	0	0	12.00	2.00	3	6	4	4	0	5	
Scott Diamond	1	0	0	0	0	27.00	4.00	1	2	3	3	2	0	
R. A. Dickey	30	29	10	15	0	4.46	1.37	169 2/3	169	97	85	63	126	
Marco Estrada	29	29	9	9	0	3.48	1.12	176	132	73	68	65	165	
Scott Feldman	14	0	2	1	0	8.40	1.93	15	23	15	14	6	14	
Gavin Floyd	28	0	2	4	0	4.06	1.00	31	23	14	14	8	30	
Chad Girodo	14	0	0	0	0	4.35	1.26	10 1/3	11	5	5	2	5	
Ryan Goins	1	0	0	0	0	0.00	3.00	1	2	0	0	1	0	
Jason Grilli	46	0	6	4	2	3.64	1.12	42	28	17	17	19	58	
J. A. Happ	32	32	20	4	0	3.18	1.17	195	168	72	69	60	163	
Drew Hutchison	3	2	1	0	0	4.97	1.34	12 2/3	13	7	7	4	12	
Arnold León	2	0	0	0	0	7.71	1.71	2 1/3	3	2	2	1	2	
Francisco Liriano	10	8	2	2	0	2.92	1.18	49 1/3	42	22	16	16	52	
Aaron Loup	21	0	0	0	0	5.02	1.33	14 1/3	15	8	8	4	15	
Franklin Morales	5	0	0	1	0	9.00	1.25	4	3	4	4	2	2	
Roberto Osuna	72	0	4	3	36	2.68	0.93	74	55	23	22	14	82	
Aaron Sanchez	30	30	15	2	0	3.00	1.17	192	161	69	64	63	161	
Bo Schultz	16	0	0	1	0	5.51	1.22	16 1/3	17	10	10	3	10	
Drew Storen	38	0	1	3	3	6.21	1.59	33 1/3	43	23	23	10	32	
Marcus Stroman	32	32	9	10	0	4.37	1.29	204	209	104	99	54	166	
Ryan Tepera	20	0	0	1	0	2.95	1.36	18 1/3	17	8	6	8	18	
Pat Venditte	8	0	0	0	0	5.19	1.73	8 2/3	11	8	5	4	7	
Team totals	162	162	89	73	43	3.78	1.23	1459.1	1340	666	613	461	1314	

== Awards ==
Recipient	Award	Date awarded	Ref.
Josh Donaldson	American League Player of the Week (June 13–19)	June 20, 2016	
Josh Donaldson	All-Star	July 5, 2016	
Edwin Encarnación	All-Star	July 5, 2016	
Marco Estrada	All-Star	July 5, 2016	
Michael Saunders	All-Star	July 8, 2016	
Aaron Sanchez	All-Star	July 9, 2016	
Aaron Sanchez	American League ERA leader	October 2, 2016	
Edwin Encarnación	American League RBI co-leader	October 2, 2016	

== Transactions ==
=== April ===
- On April 2, signed Franklin Morales to a one-year, $2 million contract, and optioned Ryan Tepera to Triple-A Buffalo.
- On April 3, placed Marco Estrada, Aaron Loup, Devon Travis, and Bo Schultz on the 15-day disabled list, and acquired Chris Leroux from the Philadelphia Phillies in exchange for cash considerations.
- On April 7, outrighted A. J. Jiménez to Triple-A Buffalo.
- On April 10, activated Marco Estrada off the 15-day disabled list, and placed Franklin Morales on the 15-day disabled list, retroactive to April 7, with left shoulder fatigue.
- On April 13, designated Arnold León for assignment, and recalled Pat Venditte from Triple-A Buffalo.
- On April 15, signed Kyle Westwood to a minor league contract.
- On April 22, placed Chris Colabello on the restricted list, signed Michael Bourn to a minor league contract, and selected the contract of Chad Girodo from the Triple-A Buffalo Bisons.
- On April 23, outrighted Arnold León to Triple-A Buffalo.
- On April 24, optioned Chad Girodo and recalled Drew Hutchison from Triple-A Buffalo.
- On April 26, optioned Drew Hutchison and recalled Matt Dominguez from Triple-A Buffalo.
- On April 27, signed Roberto Hernández to a minor league contract, optioned Pat Venditte, and recalled Ryan Tepera from Triple-A Buffalo.
- On April 28, sent Bo Schultz on a rehab assignment to the Advanced-A Dunedin Blue Jays.

=== May ===
- On May 4, optioned Matt Dominguez, recalled Chad Girodo from Triple-A Buffalo, and sent Bo Schultz on a rehab assignment to the Double-A New Hampshire Fisher Cats.
- On May 6, optioned Ryan Tepera, and selected the contract of Andy Burns from Triple-A Buffalo.
- On May 9, placed Brett Cecil on the paternity list and recalled Ryan Tepera from Triple-A Buffalo.
- On May 12, activated Brett Cecil from the paternity list, and optioned Ryan Tepera to Triple-A Buffalo.
- On May 13, sent Devon Travis on a rehab assignment to the Advanced-A Dunedin Blue Jays.
- On May 14, sent Aaron Loup and Bo Schultz on rehab assignments to the Advanced-A Dunedin Blue Jays and Triple-A Buffalo Bisons respectively.
- On May 15, placed Brett Cecil on the 15-day disabled list, and selected the contract of Dustin Antolin from the Triple-A Buffalo Bisons.
- On May 16, claimed Jimmy Paredes off waivers from the Baltimore Orioles.
- On May 17, activated Jimmy Paredes, recalled Pat Venditte, and optioned Andy Burns and Dustin Antolin to Triple-A Buffalo.
- On May 19, sent Devon Travis on a rehab assignment to the Triple-A Buffalo Bisons.
- On May 21, sent Aaron Loup on a rehab assignment to the Triple-A Buffalo Bisons.
- On May 25, activated Devon Travis and optioned Pat Venditte to the Triple-A Buffalo Bisons.
- On May 27, signed Ryan Lavarnway to a minor league contract.
- On May 28, placed Troy Tulowitzki on the 15-day disabled list, and activated Aaron Loup.
- On May 30, designated Jimmy Paredes for assignment, and recalled Ryan Tepera from the Triple-A Buffalo Bisons.
- On May 31, acquired Jason Grilli and cash considerations from the Atlanta Braves for Sean Ratcliffe.

=== June ===
- On June 1, activated Jason Grilli, optioned Chad Girodo to Triple-A Buffalo, and traded Jimmy Paredes to the Philadelphia Phillies for cash considerations or a player to be named later.
- On June 3, signed Wilmin Lara to a minor league contract.
- On June 5, optioned Ryan Tepera and recalled Matt Dominguez from Triple-A Buffalo.
- On June 7, designated Matt Dominguez for assignment and recalled Pat Venditte from the Triple-A Buffalo Bisons.
- On June 8, optioned Matt Dominguez to the Triple-A Buffalo Bisons.
- On June 13, transferred Franklin Morales to the 60-day disabled list, optioned Pat Venditte, and selected the contract of Scott Diamond from the Triple-A Buffalo Bisons.
- On June 15, designated Scott Diamond for assignment, optioned Aaron Loup, and recalled Andy Burns and Chad Girodo from Triple-A Buffalo.
- On June 16, sent Troy Tulowitzki on a rehab assignment to the Advanced-A Dunedin Blue Jays.
- On June 17, placed José Bautista on the 15-day disabled list with a left foot injury, and recalled Darrell Ceciliani from Triple-A Buffalo.
- On June 18, activated Troy Tulowitzki and optioned Andy Burns to Triple-A Buffalo.
- On June 21, sent Brett Cecil and Franklin Morales on a rehab assignment to the Advanced-A Dunedin Blue Jays.
- On June 22, traded Wade LeBlanc to the Seattle Mariners for cash considerations or a player to be named later.
- On June 24, optioned Darrell Ceciliani, and selected the contact of Junior Lake from the Triple-A Buffalo Bisons.
- On June 25, sent Brett Cecil on a rehab assignment to the Triple-A Buffalo Bisons.
- On June 26, placed Gavin Floyd on the 15-day disabled list with right shoulder tightness, recalled Bo Schultz, and sent Franklin Morales on a rehab assignment to the Triple-A Buffalo Bisons.
- On June 27, optioned Chad Girodo and recalled Ryan Tepera from the Triple-A Buffalo Bisons.
- On June 30, activated Brett Cecil and optioned Ryan Tepera to the Triple-A Buffalo Bisons.

=== July ===
- On July 2, placed Ryan Goins on the 15-day disabled list with right forearm tightness, optioned Bo Schultz, and recalled Drew Hutchison and Aaron Loup from Triple-A Buffalo.
- On July 6, placed Marco Estrada on the 15-day disabled list with a back injury, and recalled Bo Schultz from Triple-A Buffalo.
- On July 7, signed Wilmer Font to a minor league contract.
- On July 8, optioned Drew Hutchinson and recalled Andy Burns from Triple-A Buffalo.
- On July 15, sent Ryan Goins on a rehab assignment to the Triple-A Buffalo Bisons.
- On July 20, sent José Bautista on a rehab assignment to the Advanced-A Dunedin Blue Jays.
- On July 22, activated Marco Estrada and Franklin Morales, optioned Aaron Loup and Andy Burns, designated Dustin Antolin for assignment, and sent José Bautista on a rehab assignment to the Triple-A Buffalo Bisons.
- On July 23, designated Chris Colabello for assignment, and outrighted Dustin Antolin to Triple-A Buffalo.
- On July 24, designated Drew Storen for assignment, and recalled Ryan Tepera from Triple-A Buffalo.
- On July 25, activated Jose Bautista, and designated Junior Lake for assignment.
- On July 26, traded Hansel Rodriguez to the San Diego Padres for Melvin Upton Jr. and cash considerations, and traded Drew Storen and cash considerations to the Seattle Mariners for Joaquín Benoit.
- On July 27, activated Joaquín Benoit, and optioned Bo Schultz to Triple-A Buffalo.
- On July 28, signed Erik Kratz to a minor league contract.
- On July 31, outrighted Junior Lake to Triple-A Buffalo.

=== August ===
- On August 1, designated Franklin Morales and Ben Rowen for assignment, placed Ezequiel Carrera on the 15-day disabled list with a left Achilles tendon strain, recalled Bo Schultz from Triple-A Buffalo, activated Ryan Goins, acquired Mike Bolsinger from the Los Angeles Dodgers for Jesse Chavez and cash considerations, Scott Feldman from the Houston Astros for Guadalupe Chavez, and Francisco Liriano, Reese McGuire, and Harold Ramírez from the Pittsburgh Pirates for Drew Hutchison, and optioned Bolsinger to Triple-A Buffalo and Ramírez to Double-A New Hampshire.
- On August 2, optioned Ryan Goins and Bo Schultz, recalled Mike Bolsinger, and selected the contract of Danny Barnes from the Triple-A Buffalo Bisons.
- On August 3, activated Francisco Liriano and optioned Mike Bolsinger to Triple-A Buffalo.
- On August 6, traded Pat Venditte to the Seattle Mariners for a player to be named later.
- On August 8, placed Kevin Pillar on the 15-day disabled list with a left thumb sprain, and recalled Darrell Ceciliani from Triple-A Buffalo.
- On August 9, released Franklin Morales.
- On August 10, optioned Danny Barnes, placed José Bautista on the 15-day disabled list with a left knee sprain, recalled Ryan Tepera, and selected the contract of Junior Lake from the Triple-A Buffalo Bisons.
- On August 12, sent Ezequiel Carrera on a rehab assignment to the Triple-A Buffalo Bisons.
- On August 16, signed John Straka to a minor league contract, activated Ezequiel Carrera, and designated Junior Lake for assignment.
- On August 18, signed Ty Sterner to a minor league contract.
- On August 19, acquired Richard Reina from the New York Mets for cash considerations, signed Gregor Mora to a minor league contract, recalled Ryan Goins, optioned Darrell Ceciliani, and outrighted Junior Lake to Triple-A Buffalo.
- On August 20, sent Kevin Pillar on a rehab assignment to the Advanced-A Dunedin Blue Jays.
- On August 21, optioned Aaron Sanchez to the Advanced-A Dunedin Blue Jays, and recalled Aaron Loup.
- On August 23, activated Kevin Pillar and optioned Ryan Tepera to Triple-A Buffalo.
- On August 25, activated José Bautista, optioned Ryan Goins, and signed Eric Veglahn to a minor league contract.
- On August 26, acquired Dioner Navarro from the Chicago White Sox for Colton Turner.
- On August 27, designated Aaron Loup for assignment, and recalled Bo Schultz from Triple-A Buffalo.
- On August 29, activated Dioner Navarro and designated Josh Thole for assignment.
- On August 31, recalled Aaron Sanchez and Ryan Goins, signed Josh Thole, placed Darwin Barney on the family medical emergency list, and optioned Bo Schultz to Triple-A Buffalo.

=== September ===
- On September 1, optioned Devon Travis to the Rookie-Advanced Bluefield Blue Jays.
- On September 2, designated Matt Dominguez for assignment, selected the contract of Matt Dermody, and recalled Danny Barnes, Darrell Ceciliani, Dalton Pompey, Ryan Tepera, and Devon Travis.
- On September 3, activated Darwin Barney, and outrighted Matt Dominguez to Triple-A Buffalo.
- On September 6, recalled Aaron Loup and Bo Schultz.
- On September 27, designated Brady Dragmire for assignment, recalled Andy Burns, and selected the contract of Chris Smith from the Triple-A Buffalo Bisons.

=== October ===
- On October 5, traded Brady Dragmire to the Pittsburgh Pirates for cash considerations.

== Farm system ==
Level	Team	League	Manager	Win–loss record	Position	Postseason	Ref.
Triple-A	Buffalo Bisons	International League	Gary Allenson	66–78	5th place International North; 25½ GB	Did not qualify	
Double-A	New Hampshire Fisher Cats	Eastern League	Bobby Meacham	69–73	4th place Eastern League Eastern; 20½ GB	Did not qualify	
Advanced-A	Dunedin Blue Jays	Florida State League	Ken Huckaby	33–36 (first half); 43–23 (second half)	North Division; 5th place (first half); 9 GB; 1st place (second half) +1 G	1–2; Lost FSL Semi-Final	
Class-A	Lansing Lugnuts	Midwest League	John Schneider	36–34 (first half); 33–37 (second half)	Eastern Division; 6th place (first half); 5½ GB; 4th place (second half); 14 GB	Did not qualify	
Short Season-A	Vancouver Canadians	Northwest League	John Tamargo	16–22 (first half); 13–23 (second half)	North Division; 4th place (first half); 3 GB; 3rd place (second half); 13 GB	Did not qualify	
Rookie Advanced	Bluefield Blue Jays	Appalachian League	Dennis Holmberg	37–31	3rd place Appalachian League East; 5 GB	Did not qualify	
Rookie	GCL Blue Jays	Gulf Coast League	Cesar Martin	39–17	2nd place GCL Northwest; 3 GB	Did not qualify	
Rookie	DSL Blue Jays	Dominican Summer League	Carlos Villalobos	36–32	2nd place DSL Baseball City; 12½ GB	Did not qualify	
