= 2016 Boston Red Sox season =

Major League Baseball season

2016 Boston Red Sox
- American League East champions
- League: American League
- Division: East
- Ballpark: Fenway Park
- City: Boston, Massachusetts
- Record: 93–69 (.574)
- Divisional place: 1st
- Owners: John W. Henry (Fenway Sports Group)
- President: Sam Kennedy
- President of baseball operations: Dave Dombrowski
- General manager: Mike Hazen (until October 16)
- Manager: John Farrell
- Television: NESN (Dave O'Brien, Jerry Remy, Dennis Eckersley, Steve Lyons, Tom Caron)
- Radio: WEEI-FM; Boston Red Sox Radio Network (Joe Castiglione, Tim Neverett, Lou Merloni)
- Stats: ESPN.com; Baseball Reference

The 2016 Boston Red Sox season was the 116th season in the franchise's Major League Baseball history. The Red Sox finished first in the American League East for the first of three consecutive seasons with a record of 93–69. In the postseason, the team was swept by the American League Central champion Cleveland Indians in the ALDS. This was the final season for 3-time World Series champion David Ortiz.

== Offseason ==
=== October 2015 ===
- On October 22, 2015, in followup to the August 2015 announcement by NESN that longtime play-by-play announcer Don Orsillo would be replaced for the 2016 season by Dave O'Brien, NESN further announced that the color analyst position would be filled with a combination of Jerry Remy, Dennis Eckersley and Steve Lyons.
- On October 25, 2015, the Red Sox hired former Philadelphia Phillies general manager Rubén Amaro Jr. as their first base coach. He replaces Arnie Beyeler.

=== November 2015 ===
- On November 8, 2015, the Red Sox re-signed catcher Sandy León to a one-year, $534K deal, but subsequently outrighted him along with Allen Craig, Jean Machi and Alexi Ogando.
- On November 13, 2015, the Red Sox traded top prospects SS Javier Guerra and OF Manuel Margot, along with prospects LHP Logan Allen and IF Carlos Asuaje, to the San Diego Padres for RHP closer Craig Kimbrel.

=== December 2015 ===
- On December 2, 2015, the Red Sox signed OF Chris Young to a two-year, $13M deal.
- On December 4, 2015, the Red Sox signed LHP David Price to a seven-year, $217M deal. The contract includes an opt-out clause after the 2018 season.
- On December 7, 2015, the Red Sox traded LHP Wade Miley and RHP Jonathan Aro to the Seattle Mariners for RHP Carson Smith and LHP Roenis Elías.

== Regular season ==
=== Opening Day, April 5 in Cleveland ===
The opening day game, scheduled for April 4, was postponed to April 5, due to cold weather. The game was called two hours prior to game time.

On April 5, in his Red Sox debut, David Price struck out ten Indians batters and earned the win. He became the fifth Red Sox pitcher to win an opening day game in his debut for the ball club and the first since Pedro Martínez did it in 1998. Mookie Betts went deep in the third inning, scoring Jackie Bradley Jr. and gave Boston an early 2–0 lead. In a four-hit inning, Cleveland brought two runners home and the game was tied at two in the bottom of the fourth. In the sixth, on a Travis Shaw single, Hanley Ramírez took third base from first, and scored on a Brock Holt blooper to left field. Travis Shaw took third on a Blake Swihart ground out and scored on a wild pitch by Corey Kluber. Junichi Tazawa and Koji Uehara retired all batters they faced in the seventh and eighth respectively and with Craig Kimbrel warming in the bullpen and Dustin Pedroia on first, David Ortiz hit his fifth opening day home run of his career, extending the lead to 6–2. Although not a save situation, Kimbrel made his Red Sox debut in the ninth and shut the door, allowing a walk and striking out two.

==== Opening Day lineup ====
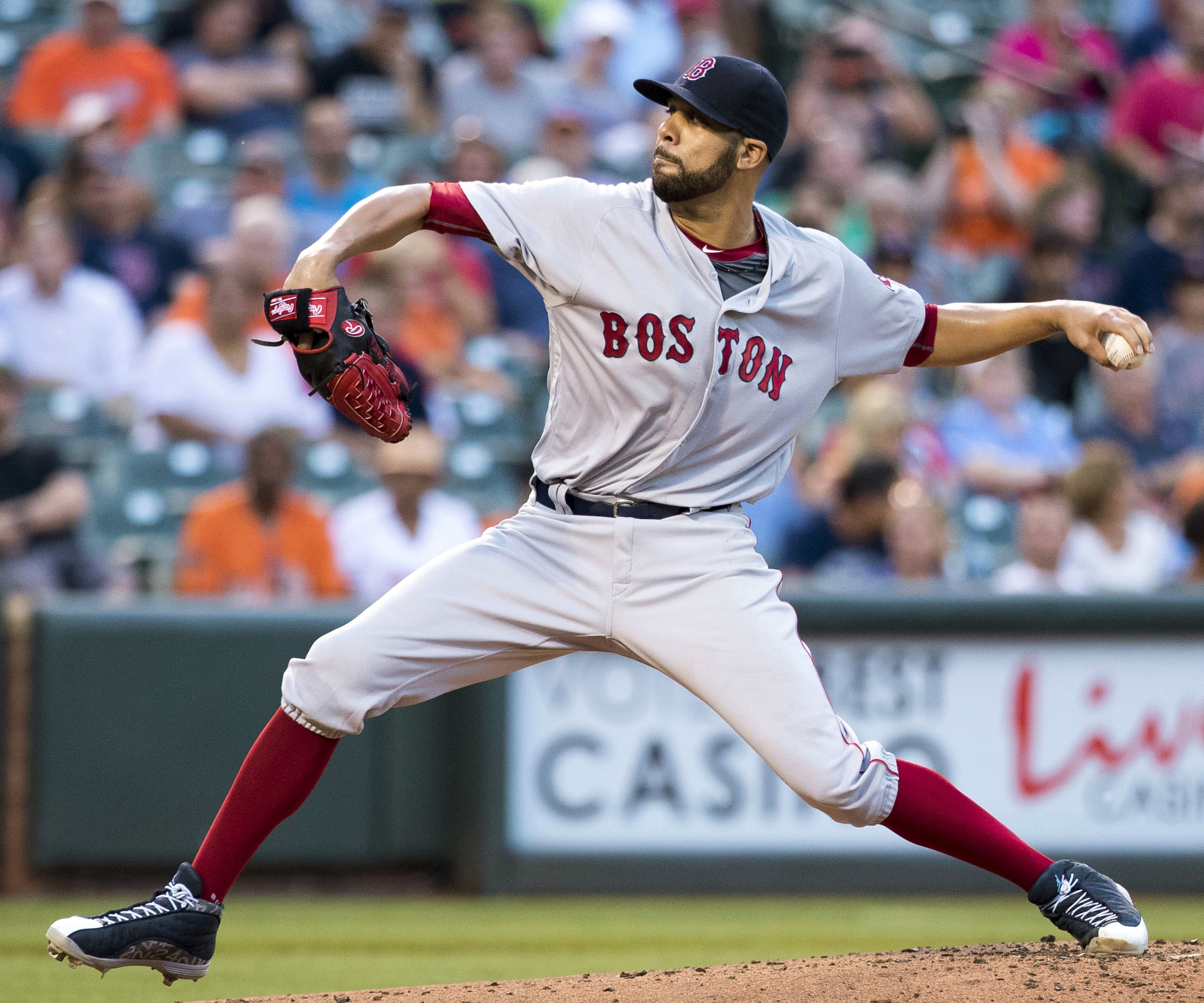
Opening Day starter David Price

50	Mookie Betts	RF
15	Dustin Pedroia	2B
2	Xander Bogaerts	SS
34	David Ortiz	DH
13	Hanley Ramírez	1B
47	Travis Shaw	3B
12	Brock Holt	LF
23	Blake Swihart	C
25	Jackie Bradley Jr.	CF
24	David Price	P

=== April ===
April 6–7, in Cleveland
The series in Cleveland ended on a sour note after Red Sox reliever Junichi Tazawa let up a game-winning home run to former Red Sox first baseman Mike Napoli, who was influential in the Sox's 2013 World Series run. The April 7 game was postponed due to rain, and rescheduled for August 15.
Red Sox split the series 1–1 (12–9 runs)
April 8–10, in Toronto
In the series opener, Joe Kelly was rocked for 7 earned runs in 3 innings, leaving the Red Sox in a big hole due to Josh Donaldson's grand slam, but Brock Holt would hit a grand slam of his own and the Sox would win the game after a furious comeback effort. The next day, the Red Sox tagged knuckleballer R. A. Dickey for 7 runs to improve to 3–1. However, the Sox lost the third game of the series as two runs given up by Steven Wright in the first inning proved to make all the difference as the Red Sox failed to score 6+ runs in a game for the first time this season.
Red Sox won the series 2–1 (16–14 runs)
April 11–13, vs. Baltimore
The Red Sox then came home to face the undefeated Orioles. David Price underperformed in his Boston home opener, giving up 5 runs in the third after the Sox jumped out to an early 3–0 lead, but it was Craig Kimbrel who took the loss after giving up a 3-run homer to Chris Davis to break a 6–6 tie in the top of the 9th. On the 12th, the Orioles' bats outperformed Boston's as Mike Wright and Clay Buchholz both failed to pitch 6 innings. In the series finale, the Red Sox finally gave Baltimore its first loss on the season as the bullpen proved to be strong, holding a 2-run lead for four innings.
Red Sox lost the series 1–2 (16–20 runs)
April 15–18, vs. Toronto
Catcher Christian Vazquez returned to the Red Sox lineup for the first time since 2014 after undergoing Tommy John surgery, going 2-for-4 and making some great defensive plays. Travis Shaw's 2 2-out RBI made the difference as the Sox backed Porcello for a win. David Price earned his first home win the next day after his solid pitching was supported by Xander Bogaerts's 3-run home run. But much like the previous weekend, the Sox dropped the third game of the series after the offense went cold to give Steven Wright another loss despite only giving up 2 runs in 6 innings. On Patriots' Day, Clay Buchholz had one of his best career outings, but it was spoiled after Koji Uehara and the bullpen combined to give up 4 runs in the eighth.
Red Sox split the series 2–2 (15–14 runs)
April 19–21, vs. Tampa Bay
Drew Smyly held the Red Sox to 1 hit, getting out of a bases-loaded, no-out jam in the third inning, which would prove to be important as the Rays won, 3–0, in 10 innings after neither team scored through 9. But the Sox would rebound by scoring 6 runs off of Tampa Bay ace Chris Archer, who was struggling mightily to open the season. David Price pitched poorly in the rubber match; after the Red Sox jumped out to a 5–1 lead in the first inning, Price gave up 7 runs and the offense was unable to keep up with the bullpen's poor work in a Red Sox loss that had many fans questioning John Farrell's decision-making skills as a manager.
Red Sox lost the series 1–2 (15–18 runs)
April 22–24, in Houston
The Red Sox were finally able to give Steven Wright run support as Mookie Betts finished a homer shy of the cycle in the Red Sox's 6–2 win. The next day, Clay Buchholz's instability was exposed as he gave up a game-winning grand slam to Colby Rasmus in the 6th inning of the Red Sox's loss. The Red Sox would win the rubber match in 12 innings. Craig Kimbrel blew the save opportunity as Colby Rasmus hit another home run against the Red Sox to tie the game, but Heath Hembree pitched 3 scoreless innings and Jackie Bradley Jr. drove in 2 runs in the 12th to seal the series victory for the Red Sox.
Red Sox won the series 2–1 (16–15 runs)
April 25–28, in/vs. Atlanta
Coming in late to a home-and-home 4-game series against the league's worst team, the Red Sox bats were unable to score against Braves ace Julio Teherán. Jackie Bradley Jr.'s home run was the only run scored by either team in the game as Rick Porcello fired 6.1 scoreless innings. But the bats would reawaken the next day as the Red Sox scored 11 runs. David Price excelled in the Red Sox's win, giving up 2 runs over 8 innings. The teams returned to Boston and Dustin Pedroia's grand slam aided Steven Wright, who finished the day with the third best ERA in the American League (after Jordan Zimmermann and Mat Latos), in the Red Sox's 9–4 win. However, Clay Buchholz could not keep the strong pitching going as he gave up 5 runs in a 5–3 loss.
Red Sox won the series 3–1 (24–13 runs)
April 29–30, vs. New York
The Red Sox entered their first of 6 series against their arch-rivals as Henry Owens started against Yankees ace Masahiro Tanaka. Owens struggled with command throughout the game, but he only gave up 2 runs. The Red Sox offense remained scoreless until the 7th inning, when Jackie Bradley Jr. continued his week of clutch hitting with a first-pitch 2 RBI double off the Green Monster. But the offense continued to perform well when David Ortiz hit a towering 2-run home run to center off of elite setup man Dellin Betances, who had a sub-1.00 ERA and a 20 K/9 rate entering the game. Koji Uehara and Craig Kimbrel retired the last 6 batters to preserve Boston's 4–2 win. Rick Porcello went 7 shutout innings to improve to 5–0 and Robbie Ross Jr. and Junichi Tazawa held New York scoreless in an 8–0 win to wrap up the month of April.

Composite line score April

Team	1	2	3	4	5	6	7	8	9	10	12	R	H	E
Opponent	14	9	13	19	5	8	11	10	13	3	0	105	196	19
Boston	29	14	16	8	8	19	11	5	14	0	2	126	238	11

_{*Extra innings without runs are not displayed}

=== May ===
May 1, vs. New York (cont.)
The Red Sox completed the three-game sweep with the help of a Christian Vázquez home run in the seventh off of Dellin Betances, who posted an 0.9 ERA and 0.8 WHIP before the series. David Price gave up six earned runs but improved to 4–0 on the season with a 6.14 ERA and a 2.88 FIP.
Red Sox won the series 3–0 (20–9 runs)
May 3–5, in Chicago
Coming into the series, the White Sox had the best record and the best pitching staff in the AL. That good pitching showed up in the first game, with Quintana only giving up one run in eight innings of work, wasting another good start of Steven Wright, who gave up two runs in six innings. Boston took a five inning lead in the second game, off of a David Ortiz home run, earning the first win for Clay Buchholz. Craig Kimbrel preserved the 5–2 win with his ninth save. In game three, the Red Sox scored in each of the first three innings and never looked back, taking the rubber match 7–3.
Red Sox won the series 2–1 (13–9 runs)
May 6–8, in the Bronx
With the bases loaded and one out in a one-run game, David Ortiz was called out on strikes on a 3–2 pitch below the knees in the top of the ninth. Ortiz and John Farrell were both ejected, arguing the calls made by home plate umpire Ron Kulpa. Rick Porcello was charged with his first loss of the season. The following day, David Price gave up six runs and also lost his first game in a 1–8 effort. Steven Wright pitched a complete three-hit, one-run game to avoid the sweep. All six runs of the game were scored on the long ball, with David Ortiz going deep twice.
Red Sox lost the series 1–2 (9–12 runs)
May 9–11, vs. Oakland
Down 1–4 after three innings, the Red Sox put up a six-spot in the fourth, chasing Oakland's ace Sonny Gray from the game, and continued to score in the next three innings for another seven runs. Jackie Bradley Jr. hit his first career grand slam and earned six RBI. In game two, Sean O'Sullivan made his first start for Boston. Despite giving up 12 hits, he made it through the sixth and earned the win. Boston gave him 13 runs of support, 11 in the first five innings. Hanley Ramírez hit the second longest home run of the season thus far, estimated at 468 feet, over the far end of the green monster. Travis Shaw drove in five runs. Rick Porcello continued his strong season with another good outing, going 6 2/3 innings with six hits and 3 runs allowed. The bats stayed hot, scoring eleven runs from the second through the sixth inning. Jackie Bradley Jr. hit two long balls and drove in another six runs. The Red Sox and Athletics combined for 82 hits in the series, with Boston out-hitting the A's 48–34. With three games with 13+ runs scored, the Red Sox became the seventh team in Major League history to do so and the first since the 1999 Cleveland Indians.
Red Sox won the series 3–0 (40–15 runs)
May 12–15, vs. Houston
The Red Sox continued their hot offense, scoring in each inning except the fourth and fifth. They extended their streak of 11+ runs scored to four, the first time since the Braves did it in 2007. David Price bounced back, allowing one run in 6 2/3 innings and striking out twelve. Steven Wright gave up the most runs this season in game two of the series, five in 4 1/3 innings of work, giving up the 5–1 lead in the fifth. In the sixth Houston scored two runs and the offense could only get back one. In game three, the Astros held their one run lead until the ninth, but David Ortiz batted home both the game-tying run in the ninth inning and the game-winning run in extra innings at Fenway Park as he doubled, tripled and homered against the Houston Astros. The double was the walk-off hit to lift the Red Sox to a 6–5 win in the 11th inning, his 20th career walk-off hit. The triple had tied the score in the ninth inning, and, in a career where he averaged approximately one triple per season, this game marked the first time he had at least one of each type of extra base hit in the same game. Further, the double was the 600th of Ortiz' career, making him the 15th player all time to reach the milestone. He also joined Hank Aaron and Barry Bonds as the third player with 500 career home runs and 600 career doubles. One day later, the Astros again had a one-run lead in late innings, but Boston came back in the seventh with the help of the sun, which continued the inning with two outs and consequently the tying and winning run scored, the latter on a Mookie Betts triple. Craig Kimbrel recorded his tenth save. The Red Sox finished their homestand with a 6–1 record and 73 runs scored.
Red Sox won the series 3–1 (33–22 runs)
May 17–18, in Kansas City
The May 16 game was rained out and rescheduled as part of a day-night-doubleheader on May 18. In game 1, the Royals took an early 5–1 lead in the fourth. Boston's rally fell one run short and in the eighth Kansas City added three more to put the game virtually out of reach. Game 2 saw another good start of Steven Wright got wasted. He pitched a complete game, giving up three runs on three hits but the offense could only give him two runs of support. Chris Young hit his first home run in a Red Sox uniform but Royals pitching struck out 13 Red Sox batters. This was the fourth time in eight starts, Wright has gotten three runs or less in support. Jackie Bradley Jr. extended his hitting streak to 23 games, with a one-out single in the ninth. David Price continued his good work in game 3 of the series, giving up 2 runs in 7 1/3 innings. The Red Sox extended their home run streak to 19 games on a Jackie Bradley Jr. solo shot in the second inning and never looked back to avoid the sweep.
Red Sox lost the series 1–2 (11–13 runs)
May 20–22, vs. Cleveland
Cleveland pitching held the Red Sox to two runs, with one run in each of the first two innings. The Indians scored four runs in the third and that was all of the runs scored in the game. In game two, after returning from the DL with a right shoulder impingement, starting pitcher Joe Kelly took a no-hitter through 6 2/3 IP against the Cleveland Indians until Juan Uribe broke it up with a double. Boston won, 9–1. In the rubber match, David Ortiz, would extended the team home run streak to 22 games in the fifth, made a bid for the cycle, but a fly ball to the deepest part of Fenway Park bounced into the stands for an automatic double instead of the needed triple. Jackie Bradley Jr. extended his league best hitting streak to 27. Rick Porcello gave up two runs in 5 2/3 innings and earned his seventh win in the 5–2 contest.
Red Sox won the series 2–1 (16–7 runs)

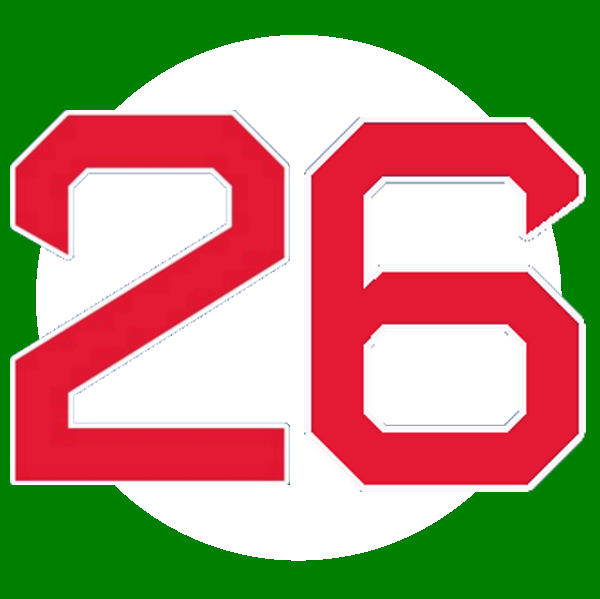
Wade Boggs's number 26 was retired by the Boston Red Sox in 2016.

May 24–26, vs. Colorado
Colorado's starter Jorge de la Rosa was chased after 3 1/3 innings, allowing seven runs on nine hits. David Price gave up five hits and three runs in seven innings of work. In game two, the offense scored seven times of Chad Bettis, who was pulled after 4 2/3 innings. Steven Wright had another good outing, allowing three runs, two of them earned, in his seven innings. Jackie Bradley Jr. snapped his hitting streak of 29 consecutive games in game three. The offense could only get two runs and Clay Buchholz, who gave up six runs in five innings, lost his place in the rotation after the game.
Red Sox won the series 2–1 (20–14 runs)
May 27–29, in Toronto
Down 2–5 after six innings, Boston tied the game in the eighth but Josh Donaldson gave Toronto the win with his second home run of the night. Joe Kelly went only 4 2/3 innings. Tommy Layne and Junichi Tazawa could not protect a four-run lead after seven innings. Craig Kimbrel was summoned from the bullpen for the five out save which he eventually blew, with the tying run on third base with only one out. The Red Sox retook the lead in the ninth on a David Ortiz home run. After two quick outs in the bottom of the inning and two times down to their last strike, Kimbrel gave up three consecutive hits and the Blue Jays walked off. Game three went into extra innings and Gavin Floyd walked Swihart & Betts in the eleventh inning and both eventually scored. With his career-high 39 pitch outing the day before, Kimbrel was unavailable and Koji Uehara earned his first save since August 5, 2015. Clay Buchholz was credited with the win, with his first relief appearance since August 17, 2008, also against the Blue Jays. Xander Bogaerts extended his MLB-best hitting streak to 22 games. Dustin Pedroia kept his hitting streak against the Blue Jays alive, now sitting at 23 games. With the win the Red Sox are the first team in the American League to 30 wins.
Red Sox lost the series 1–2 (19–20 runs)
May 30–31, in Baltimore
Steven Wright pitched a four-hit, two-run complete game in Camden Yards and received seven runs of support, including the first career-home run by Marco Hernández, a three-run shot in the eighth. That was Wright's third complete game of the season. Mookie Betts exploded in the second game of the series, with three home runs and he drove in five runs. That was presumably the first three-home run-game by a Red Sox leadoff hitter in the history of the franchise. Eduardo Rodríguez returned from the disabled list, went six innings and gave up two runs on six hits.

Composite line score May

Team	1	2	3	4	5	6	7	8	9	11	R	H	E
Opponent	11	16	21	13	22	12	5	16	7	0	123	229	15
Boston	25	26	22	21	24	22	19	18	2	3	182	309	15

_{*Extra innings without runs are not displayed}

=== June ===
June 1–2, in Baltimore (cont.)
The bats stayed hot, with another multi-home run night by Mookie Betts, hitting two of the Red Sox five home runs in game three. But the pitching fell apart with all four pitchers used in the game allowing at least one run. Seven of the 13 runs allowed were charged to starter Joe Kelly, who didn't make it through the third inning and was demoted to Triple-A Pawtucket shortly after the game. Clay Buchholz surrendered the loss in his second outing from the bullpen. In game four, pitching couldn't keep up with hitting again. All four pitchers allowed two or more runs each. This was the first time since August 2006, that the Red Sox gave up 12 or more runs in back-to-back games and the first time since May/June 2003, that the Red Sox lost consecutive games in which they scored seven or more runs each. Xander Bogaerts extended his hitting streak to 26 games during the series.
Red Sox split the series 2–2 (29–29 runs)
June 3–5, vs. Toronto
Representing the tying run at the plate, Xander Bogaerts struck out in the bottom of the ninth, which ended his hitting streak and the game. Steven Wright had another good outing, allowing three runs, all unearned, in the second game but could only go five innings, due to a high pitch count. The Red Sox offense scored six time off of Marcus Stroman, which was enough to preserve the win. In the rubber match, the Blue Jays took Eduardo Rodríguez deep four times, for five runs total. Marco Estrada carried a no-hitter into the eighth, but gave up a long ball to Chris Young. To this point all hits in the game were home runs. The Red Sox rallied in the bottom of the ninth, accumulated five hits, three of them doubles, but fell one run short. Dustin Pedroia tied Jerry Remy's franchise hit streak record against Toronto at 26.
Red Sox lost the series 1–2 (12–14 runs)
June 7–8, in San Francisco
Boston took an early 2–0 lead against the NL West leading Giants but surrendered three runs in the fourth and fifth inning. In the seventh inning, the Red Sox tied the game and it went into extra innings. With the bases loaded and one out, two runs scored on a Xander Bogaerts bloop single in the top of the tenth which was the difference in the game. In game two, David Price pitched a complete game, allowing two runs on three hits. The only run for the Red Sox came off the bat of Chris Young with a solo shot in the fourth. Boston lost or split four series in a row for the first time since July/August 2014, when they dropped five consecutive series against the Blue Jays twice, Rays, Yankees and Cardinals.
Red Sox split the series 1–1 (6–5 runs)
June 10–12, in Minneapolis
Steven Wright went 7 1/3 innings, allowing only one unearned run, which put him on top of the AL leader board in ERA with 2.09. Xander Bogaerts went 4–5 with a home run and four runs driven in. In game two, after a quick 4–0 lead in the first, the Twins rallied for four runs of their own, chasing Eduardo Rodríguez after 4 2/3 innings from the game and the game was tied going into the sixth. Thanks to heads-up base running by Xander Bogaerts, he ended up at third from first base on a David Ortiz ground out and Hanley Ramírez drove him in on a sacrifice fly. The Red Sox put a five spot on the board in the eighth and ninth inning, to put the game virtually out of reach and gave them a season high fifteen runs. Xander Bogaerts had another 4–5 game including a home run, which makes him the first Red Sox player ever with at least four hits and at least one home run in consecutive games. The Twins avoided the sweep in game three. Boston rallied for three runs in the eighth, which tied the game at four. Three of the four Twins' runs were unearned for Rick Porcello. In extra innings, Minnesota had the winning run at third with one out and manager John Farrell put Mookie Betts in the infield as the fifth infielder. But it was for naught, when Max Kepler belted a 0–2 fastball by Matt Barnes over the wall in right center field for his first career-home run and the Twins walked off as winners.
Red Sox won the series 2–1 (27–12 runs)
June 14–16, vs. Baltimore
David Price went 8 innings in back-to-back outings for the first time since June 2015, as a member of the Detroit Tigers. He allowed three runs but only received two runs in support in the loss. In game two, the Red Sox chased Gausman after three innings, when they tagged him for six runs. The Orioles rallied in the seventh and eighth inning but fell two runs short. In the rubber match of the series, Ortiz produced the only run for Boston with a single home run in the ninth. In his third start, Eduardo Rodríguez went only 4 1/3 innings and gave up five runs.
Red Sox lost the series 1–2 (9–12 runs)
June 17–19, vs. Seattle
Roenis Elías made his first start for the Red Sox, against his former team. He went only 4 innings and gave up seven runs. Hembree and Layne saved the bullpen by going 3 and 2 innings respectively. Seattle took an early 2–0 off of Rick Porcello in game two but the hurler settled down after that and Boston could score six unanswered runs. In game three, David Price held the Mariners to just one run over 8 innings, his first time going 8 or more innings in three consecutive outings since July 2014 when he was with the Rays, but Boston could not score against Taijuan Walker despite two golden opportunities with a runner on third and only one out in the second and third inning. Walker left after five innings and the Red Sox scored twice with Craig Kimbrel striking out the side in the ninth. After receiving nearly seven runs (6.81) on average in support in his first 11 starts with an ERA of 5.11, David Price only received 1.75 runs on an ERA of 2.32 in his last four starts.
Red Sox won the series 2–1 (12–11 runs)
June 20–23, vs. Chicago
In a 1–1 game the Red Sox had the bases loaded with nobody out in the bottom of the ninth but could not score. The White Sox scored twice off of Craig Krimbrel in extra innings and took game one of the series. Steven Wright pitched another 9 inning game, the only run was unearned to reclaim the American League lead in ERA. Chris Sale of the White Sox earned the MLB best 12th win of the season in game two. Clay Buchholz, who returned to the rotation, pitched 5 frames and gave up three runs. Eduardo Rodríguez handed the bullpen a two-run lead in game three after six innings, but Koji Uehara gave up two home runs in the eighth and Boston dropped three games in a row. In game four the June misfortunes continued. Against a struggling James Shields, who only pitched 11 2/3 innings in his last four starts with a 24.62 ERA and 3.97 WHIP, Boston could only score once off of him in the first five innings and lost Chris Young in the second inning, who pulled his hamstring circling the bases and was put on the 15-day disabled list. The Red Sox down 1–4 coming into the sixth, the game turned into wild roller coaster ride. Shields was pulled after allowing back-to-back walks with 0 outs, both runners eventually scored and Boston subsequently put a four spot on the board. Chicago re-took the lead in the seventh on a José Abreu three-run home run off of Junichi Tazawa and had the bases loaded with nobody out in the top of the eighth. Heath Hembree escaped the jam himself unscathed and with Boston scoring in the seventh and eighth, the game was tied going into the ninth. Despite a lead-off double by David Ortiz the game went into extra innings. In the top of the tenth, the White Sox again had the bases loaded with nobody out, and again the Boston pitcher responsible for his own mess, Craig Kimbrel, escaped unscathed. In the bottom of the tenth, two batters walked with a ground-out in-between, and Xander Bogaerts, leading the MLB in batting average, came through with a walk-off single, avoiding a rare four-game sweep.
Red Sox lost the series 1–3 (16–21 runs)
June 24–26, in Arlington
David Price gave up six runs against the AL leading Rangers, and was pulled after only 2 1/3 innings. Matt Barnes gave up another run and the Rangers took a 7–2 lead into the sixth. Jackie Bradley Jr. closed the gap to three runs on a two-run shot in the sixth. Down to the last strike, Sandy León doubled after an eleven-pitch at bat to drive in Jackie Bradley Jr. Mookie Betts went deep and the game was tied. After Dustin Pedroia drew a walk, and Xander Bogaerts advanced him to third on a single, he eventually scored the winning run on a wild pitch. Koji Uehara earned the save, striking out the side. Steven Wright allowed eight runs in his 4 2/3 innings of work, but only three of them were earned, due to errors by Xander Bogaerts and Hanley Ramírez, and a passed ball by catcher Christian Vázquez. The Red Sox could only score three runs and Wright was charged with a loss for the first time since May 18 in Kansas City. In game three Clay Buchholz struggled right out of the gates, allowing the first six batters to reach base but he stranded the bases loaded with three runs scored. After that he settled down but gave up another two runs in the sixth, before being pulled from the game. Boston's bats were cold again, scoring only two times. With a four-game sweep over the Rays, the Orioles are now four games ahead of the Red Sox in the AL East.
Red Sox lost the series 1–2 (13–23 runs)
June 27–29, in St. Petersburg
Coming into the series, the Rays were on an 11-game losing streak and had the 5th lowest run producing offense in the majors. They snapped their losing streak in the first game of the series, scoring nine times in the first three innings and never looked back. Eduardo Rodríguez was charged with all of the nine runs and was pulled after 2 2/3 innings. The Red Sox could only put seven runs on the board while the Rays added another four. A strong outing by Rick Porcello, allowing only one run in six innings, was backed by eight runs of support. Matt Moore held Boston hitless through five innings in the rubber match. In the sixth, the Red Sox could load the bases on three hits with only one out, but David Ortiz and Hanley Ramírez could not drive them in. David Price allowed four runs in the first three innings, but that was all the Rays needed in the shutout win.
Red Sox lost the series 1–2 (15–19 runs)

The Red Sox started the month of June three games ahead of the Orioles and with the best record in the AL, but were struggling throughout the whole month and finished 5 games behind Baltimore and 1/2 game ahead of the Blue Jays in second place.

Composite line score June

Team	1	2	3	4	5	6	7	8	9	10	R	H	E
Opponent	29	6	20	23	13	12	18	15	1	5	142	231	15
Boston	6	8	17	9	12	24	10	17	20	3	126	247	15

=== July ===
July 1–3, vs. Los Angeles (AL)
Steven Wright gave up 4 earned runs in the sixth, the most since May 13 in Houston, but was backed with 5 runs from the offense for the win. In game 2, Boston pitching gave up 21 runs, including an eleven run seventh inning, the most since August 2012 in Oakland, and the most at home since August 2009 against the Yankees. Mookie Betts scored the only two runs for the Red Sox, on an error and a home run. The Red Sox bounced back in game three of the series, scoring seven times in the fifth and three times in the seventh, after the Angels scored five unanswered runs in the sixth and seventh. Sean O'Sullivan went 5+ innings in his third start of the season, with two runs allowed on four hits.
Red Sox won the series 2–1 (17–30 runs)
July 4–6, vs. Texas
The Rangers got early to Rick Porcello and scored four times in the first. Porcello settled down and pitched five scoreless innings afterwards, despite giving up 12 hits. The Red Sox loaded the bases in the bottom of the first but could only score one run, on a Jackie Bradley Jr. walk. Boston put a four spot on the board in the third and then scored at least one run in each inning from the fifth on forwards. Both teams combined for 37 hits, with the Red Sox out-hitting the Rangers 21–16. The first inning struggles for Boston pitching continued in game 2, with a first pitch home run by Shin-Soo Choo off of David Price and the first four batters to reach base safely. Price got out of the bases loaded, nobody out jam, with giving up only one more run. Boston missed golden opportunities to score; no runs scored with runners on first and third and nobody out in the first and third and one out in the second. In the fourth, down 1–2, Brock Holt and Travis Shaw opened the frame with a double and a single, but Shaw was thrown out at second. Holt would eventually score on back-to-back-to-back walks with two outs. The Red Sox ultimately stranded 14 runners and lost the game. Kimbrel imploded in the ninth, trying to keep it a one run game, giving up four runs and no outs recorded. In game three, Boston scored eleven times in the first four innings. Steven Wright went through five innings, with only one run allowed, but was tagged for five more in the sixth and seventh. Wright gave up four or more earned runs in back-to-back outings for the first time this season. The series saw 43 runs scored on 79 hits.
Red Sox won the series 2–1 (25–18 runs)

On the off-day, the Red Sox acquired INF Aaron Hill from the Brewers, via trade, for prospects INF Wendell Rijo and RHP Aaron Wilkerson. One day later, before the series with the Rays, Boston acquired UTIL Michael Martínez from the Indians for cash.

July 8–10, vs. Tampa Bay
Sean O'Sullivan went 5 innings, allowing 4 runs but the Red Sox tagged Tampa Bay's ace Chris Archer for five runs over six frames. In the bottom of the eighth, Jackie Bradley Jr. scored on back-to-back-to-back two out singles, which proved to be the difference. With Craig Krimbrel heading to the disabled list, Koji Uehara earned the save.

On July 9, with their third trade in three days, the Red Sox traded RHP Brad Ziegler from the Diamondbacks for prospects INF Luis Alejandro Basabe and RHP Jose Almonte.

Aaron Hill went 2–4 with two runs driven in, in his Red Sox debut. In game two, Rick Porcello gave up a first inning run, but then continued to pitch six scoreless innings and improved to 11–2. Xander Bogaerts went deep in the fourth with one on, and two more runs scored in the fifth, with the help of a fielding error. Uehara pitched a scoreless ninth with a hit and two strike outs. David Price went eight innings of shutout ball in the final game of the first half of the season, striking out 10 and allowing only 4 hits and a walk. The offense provided him with three runs in the first and an additional run in the second and that's all that they needed. Brad Ziegler made his Red Sox debut with a perfect ninth inning, striking out two, to complete the sweep.
Red Sox won the series 3–0 (14–6 runs)

Well before the non-waiver trade deadline, on July 14, Boston traded for starting pitcher LHP Drew Pomeranz from the Padres for top-prospect RHP Anderson Espinoza.

July 15–17, in the Bronx
Steven Wright pitched five scoreless frames, but gave up three runs in the sixth. Nonetheless, he earned the win with the offense tagging Michael Pineda for five runs, all via the long ball, in the first six innings. In game two, the Red Sox again scored five times off of New York's starter, including a three-run shot by Sandy León, and were backed by a stellar outing of Eduardo Rodríguez, allowing only one run on four hits in seven innings. Price could not repeat his last outing, allowing three runs in 5 2/3 innings and that's all the Yankees needed. The Red Sox could only score one run on a Dustin Pedroia home run in the first.
Red Sox won the series 2–1 (11–8 runs)

July 19–20, vs. San Francisco
Rick Porcello dealt 6 1/3 scoreless innings, against the majors leading Giants. All four Red Sox runs were driven in with home runs by Brock Holt and a three-run shot by David Ortiz, all charged to former Red Sox pitcher Jake Peavy. Koji Uehara removed himself from the game after seven pitches and was later placed on the disabled list with pectoral strain. Drew Pomeranz made his Red Sox debut, but lasted only three innings, facing seven batters and giving up five runs in the fourth without recording an out. The bullpen took over, with Matt Barnes tossing three scoreless innings to record the win. The offense tagged Giants' starter Matt Cain for five runs in 2 1/3 innings, and reliever Albert Suárez for another five runs in 3 innings. Hanley Ramírez contributed heavily with three home runs and six runs driven in. Boston moved to sole possession of first place in the AL East for the first time since June 4.
Red Sox won the series 2–0 (15–7 runs)

July 21–24, vs. Minnesota
Steven Wright pitched another excellent game, allowing only two runs, one earned, in 8 innings of work. Dustin Pedroia went 5-for-5, David Ortiz drove in four and Jackie Bradley Jr. three runs in the 13–2 blowout. Mookie Betts hit the first first-pitch home run since Nomar Garciaparra did so in 1997. In game 2, Eduardo Rodríguez also allowed only two runs, but the Red Sox could only score once, on another lead-off home run by Mookie Betts, this time on the second pitch of the game. Minnesota's starter Kyle Gibson went 8 innings, allowing only two hits. Boston rallied against closer Brandon Kintzler with back-to-back hits and a walk in the bottom of the ninth, but could not plate the tying run with 0 outs, when David Ortiz grounded in a double play and Hanley Ramírez lined out. The Red Sox chased Ricky Nolasco after two innings from the game, scoring six times, but David Price allowed the Twins to stay in the game, giving up four runs in the first two innings. Price left the game after 5 2/3 innings, handing the bullpen a 7–5 lead. Boston extended the lead to 8–5 but Clay Buchholz and Tommy Layne allowed five runs in the top of the seventh and ultimately lost 9–11. In the final game of the season series, the Twins struck first in the second inning but the Red Sox could take the lead on a Hanley Ramírez three-run shot, making his last five hits all longballs. Minnesota tied the game in the fourth but Boston put up a five-spot in the fifth, including a solo home run by Dustin Pedroia and a three-run home run by Travis Shaw. Rick Porcello, who advanced to 10–0 at home, the first Red Sox pitcher to do so to start the season since Don Schwall in 1961, and Matt Barnes each allowed two runs, to make it a one run game but Junichi Tazawa and Brad Ziegler both pitched a scoreless inning each to split the series.
Red Sox split the series 2–2 (31–22 runs)

July 25–27, vs. Detroit
In his second Red Sox start, Drew Pomeranz gave up only two runs on four hits in six innings of work. Former starters Clay Buchholz and Joe Kelly both gave up one run and Pomeranz was charged with the loss. Steven Wright gave up a career-high eight earned runs. The loss was charged to Robbie Ross Jr. however, who allowed the winning run in an 8–8 tie. In the final game of the series, the Red Sox tied the game in the eighth at three, but Brad Ziegler gave up the winning run to Miguel Cabrera in the ninth and the Tigers handed Boston the first sweep of the season.
Red Sox lost the series 0–3 (13–17 runs)

July 28–31, in Anaheim
David Price pitched eight scoreless innings but Brad Ziegler could not protect the one-run lead, his second loss in two days, when Hanley Ramírez airmailed a throw the plate with the bases loaded and one out, which allowed the winning run to score from second base. Porcello pitched a complete game and earned the win, allowing two runs on five hits. In game three, Drew Pomeranz gave up five runs. The Red Sox could only score in the first inning, despite six walks in five innings by Angels' starter Hector Santiago. In game four of the series, the Red Sox rallied for five runs to take a two-run lead in the ninth, including back-to-back home runs by Dustin Pedroia and Xander Bogaerts. Brad Ziegler earned the save.
Red Sox split the series 2–2 (14–12 runs)

Composite line score July

Team	1	2	3	4	5	6	7	8	9	R	H	E
Opponent	13	13	6	11	18	19	25	7	8	120	251	17
Boston	18	16	26	16	22	15	12	10	5	140	252	15

=== August ===
On the day of the trade deadline, the Red Sox acquired LHP Fernando Abad from the Twins for minor leaguer RHP Pat Light.

August 1–4, in Seattle
Neither team scored until the Mariners took a 1–0 lead in the seventh inning. Aaron Hill and Mookie Betts turned the game around with solo shots in the eighth and ninth, respectively. Craig Kimbrel, who just returned from the DL walked one batter but earned the save. In game 2, David Price took a 4–0 lead in the eighth but allowed the first four batters to reach on just nine pitches and was pulled from the game. Matt Barnes struck out the only batter he faced and newly acquired Fernando Abad was summoned from the bullpen to face Robinson Canó, but he homered to take the 5–4 lead which was the difference in the game. Rick Porcello pitched an eight inning complete game and took the loss with just one run in support. He gave up three runs on just four hits, three of them solo home runs. Andrew Benintendi collected his first hit in the majors and added a second Game four was tied at 2 from the fifth inning on. Travis Shaw scored the go ahead run in the eleventh inning on a Brock Holt RBI single. Craig Krimbrel, who was put in the game with two outs in the ninth, earned the win, Brad Ziegler recorded the save.
Red Sox split the series 2–2 (10–11 runs)
August 5–7, in Los Angeles
Steven Wright pitched his first career complete game shutout on 119 pitches with a game score of 95. The offense provided him with nine runs, including a five run eighth. Eduardo Rodríguez did not make it through the fifth inning in game two, allowing three runs. The bats were silenced by Dodgers' pitching, scoring no runs. In the rubber match, David Price allowed six runs, three of them earned, in the loss. He is currently posting a 4.34 ERA, his worst since his 2009 rookie season. Andrew Benintendi had his first three-hit game, going 3-for-4 with two runs batted in, his first RBIs. He also stole his first base. After winning five series in a row, the Red Sox did not win a series in five straight for the first time since July/August 2014.
Red Sox lost the series 1–2 (14–11 runs)
August 9–11, vs. New York
Rick Porcello earned his 100th career win in his third straight start with 8 innings or more of work. Andrew Benintendi, who went three-for-three, hit his first double, which was initially ruled a double, but was overturned to a home run on the field. After an umpire review, the call was reverted to a double. Dustin Pedroia drove in three runs. Craig Kimbrel walked four batters, three in a row with two outs, forcing in a run in the ninth. He was replaced by Matt Barnes, who recorded the one-out save. Drew Pomeranz allowed one run in 5 1/3 innings. Matt Barnes took over in the top of the seventh with a 4–1 lead, but he and Fernando Abad allowed a combined five runs. In the top of the eighth, New York added another three runs off of Junichi Tazawa and Robbie Ross Jr. to put the game out of reach. In the rubber match, Eduardo Rodríguez allowed just one run in 7 innings, but a shaky performance by Brad Ziegler gave New York the lead and ultimately the series win.
Red Sox lost the series 1–2 (11–16 runs)
August 12–14, vs. Arizona
The Red Sox took an early 6-run lead, scoring four runs in each of the first two innings. Hanley Ramírez drove in six with two three-run long balls. David Price went 8 innings, allowing three runs, two of them in the first inning. In game two, Boston was down 1–4 after the top of the fifth inning but came from behind in the fifth and sixth and ultimately won the game. With Steven Wright not available to start, and later put on the disabled list, Clay Buchholz made his first start since July 4. He went 4 1/3 innings, allowing three runs. Brad Ziegler was summoned after Matt Barnes allowed three walks to load the bases with nobody out in the eighth and struck out the side on just 10 pitches. With 2015 Cy Young runner-up Zack Greinke on the mound for Arizona, the Diamondbacks tried to avoid the sweep but Boston's offense chased him from the game after just 1 2/3 innings, allowing nine runs on ten hits. The bats stayed hot and after a seven-run second inning, the Red Sox put a six spot on the board in the fifth and scored a season-high 16 runs in the game. Mookie Betts drove in eight runs and became only the second Red Sox player with two three-home run games in a season, after Ted Williams in 1957. Dustin Pedroia, with his second five-hit performance in under a month, became the first Red Sox player with five five-hit games in his career. Rick Porcello stayed perfect at home, improving to 12–0, in his seven innings of work, where he allowed just one run.
Red Sox won the series 3–0 (31–9 runs)
August 15, in Cleveland
In the makeup game from the third game of the season opening series, Drew Pomeranz pitched into the eighth for the first time in his career. He gave up two runs on five hits in 7 2/3 innings. Fernando Abad got the crucial final out in the eighth with Rajai Davis on third base. Craig Kimbrel gave up a lead-off double to Francisco Lindor and walked Mike Napoli but then struck out Carlos Santana and Jason Kipnis and popped out Almonte to earn his 20th save of the season. Pomeranz was credited with his first win for the Red Sox thanks to a two-run shot by David Ortiz and a solo home run by Jackie Bradley Jr. in the sixth inning.
Red Sox won the series 1–0 (3–2 runs)
August 16–17, in Baltimore
Eduardo Rodríguez tossed 4 hitless innings before he was pulled with left hamstring tightness. Matt Barnes took over and carried the combined no-hitter into seventh, which was broken up by Steve Pearce. The Orioles eventually tied the game at three in that inning. With his second home run of the night, the first giving Boston a 3–0 lead in the fifth, Mookie Betts put the Red Sox up in front for good, scoring David Ortiz and driving in all five runs for his team. Betts became the 13th Red Sox player with back-to-back multiple home run games and the first after David Ortiz in 2014 against the Twins in Minneapolis. In a rain-shortened six inning affair, David Price pitched his second complete game of the season, allowing one run on four hits. Jackie Bradley Jr. drove in four of Boston's eight runs, including his 20th home run of the season. Sandy León also went deep with a blast onto Eutaw Street. With the win, the Red Sox put the Orioles to third place in the AL East for the first this season and are one game behind the division leading Blue Jays.
Red Sox won the series 2–0 (13–4 runs)
August 18–21, in Detroit
Clay Buchholz went 6 innings, giving up only one run. Junichi Tazawa was handed a 3–1 lead in the eighth, but he could not record an out, allowing three consecutive hits and was ultimately charged with the loss. Brad Ziegler was summoned in a tough spot again, but could not repeat his gem against the Diamondbacks. Boston bounced back, with a stellar 7-innings outing by Rick Porcello, who improved to an AL leading 17 wins, tied with Toronto's J.A. Happ. Hanley Ramírez drove in four of the 10 runs for the Red Sox. Drew Pomeranz earned his second win in the Red Sox uniform, but could only go 5 innings because of a rain delay. David Ortiz drove in the go-ahed and winning run, with a two-run shot in the fifth. Henry Owens made his fourth start of the season and struck out five batters in the first two innings. The Tigers eventually got to him for five runs in the third inning and three runs in the fifth. Justin Verlander held the offense to just one run on three hits. The run scored in the sixth after a lead-off triple by Andrew Benintendi, his first three-bagger of his career, and a sacrifice fly by Dustin Pedroia. One innings later, Andrew Benintendi capped a Boston four-run inning with his first career home run and shortened the Tigers lead to five runs in the seventh, but neither team could score again.
Red Sox split the series 2–2 (21–18 runs)
August 22–25, in St. Petersburg
David Price pitched a 2-hit gem in 8 scoreless innings. Up by six runs, three of them in the top of the ninth, Matt Barnes allowed two runs in the bottom of the inning but eventually secured the win. Clay Buchholz went 6 1/3 innings, allowing one run and striking out nine. The bullpen held the Rays to just one hit for the remainder of the game and Boston took game two of the series. Rick Porcello left game three with a no decision and the game went into extra innings. With two outs in the bottom of the eleventh, Heat Hembree missed a catch at first base and his quick throw to the plate could not be scooped up by catcher Sandy León, allowing the walk-off run to score. David Ortiz hit his 30th home run of the season, for his tenth 30+ home runs, 100+ RBI season. In a low-scoring game four, the Red Sox could only plate one runner. Tampa Bay scored twice to split the series.
Red Sox split the series 2–2 (12–9 runs)
August 26–28, vs. Kansas City
The Royals came to Boston with a 10–1 record in their last 11 games. They quickly scored five runs in the first inning off Steven Wright, who went five additional scoreless innings, and never looked back. In game two, the Red Sox scored seven times off of Danny Duffy and handed David Price his 13th win of the season. He lowered his ERA to under 4 for the first time since opening day. In the rubber match, Eduardo Rodríguez and Matt Barnes allowed eight runs ins the sixth inning, blowing a 4–2 lead. The Royals sent 13 hitters to the plate.
Red Sox lost the series 1–2 (15–19 runs)
August 29–31, vs. Tampa Bay
Rick Porcello remained perfect at home and earned his major league leading 18th win. In another late inning meltdown, the Rays scored three times in the seventh and eighth inning to take game two of the series. In game three, Tampa Bay took a quick 4–1 after four frames. In the bottom of the fifth, Hanley Ramírez elevated a ball over the Green Monster for his first grand slam of the season. Jackie Bradley Jr. extended the lead with a solo shot. All six Red Sox runs to this point came by the long ball. After striking out the final batter in the seventh, Fernando Abad handed Junichi Tazawa a bases loaded situation with two outs. The Rays tied the game on a single. With a second late inning meltdown in a row looming, the bats stepped up with three consecutive, one-out hits to score Hanley Ramírez and Brock Holt. Craig Kimbrel earned the save on ten pitches.
Red Sox won the series 2–1 (20–14 runs)

Composite line score August

Team	1	2	3	4	5	6	7	8	9	11	R	H	E
Opponent	9	13	12	8	15	12	16	22	5	1	113	226	11
Boston	19	18	11	15	33	22	10	15	6	1	150	285	11

_{*Extra innings without runs are not displayed}

=== September/October ===
September 2–4, in Oakland
Boston opened the scoring with a run in the first and third inning, but Oakland tied the game in the fourth. The Red Sox offense exploded, scoring four runs in the fifth and six runs in the sixth, and eventually scored a season-high 16 runs. Yoan Moncada made his major league debut with a walk, a run and a strike out. Athletics starter Andrew Triggs had to leave the game after the first inning due to an injury. After two runs in the first, Boston put a seven-spot on the board in the third, chasing Daniel Mengden from the game after 2 2/3 innings. Rick Porcello dealt another strong outing, with two runs allowed over seven frames. Mookie Betts joined Ted Williams to become only the second player in the franchise with a 30 home run, 100 RBI season before the age of 25. Yoan Moncada went 2–5, with his first hit and RBI in the majors. The Red Sox moved into a split first place in the AL East for the first time since August 25. Eduardo Rodríguez had his no-hitter broken up with two outs in the 8th inning. He received no run support and Craig Kimbrel was charged with the loss after he allowed a lead-off walk and a mishandled base hit by Brock Holt into left field. Boston allowed a season-low five runs in a three-game series.
Red Sox won the series 2–1 (27–5 runs)
September 5–7, in San Diego
Drew Pomeranz returned to his former team and went 5 2/3 innings, allowing two runs. Padres pitching struck out 14 Red Sox batters and held them two just one run, a Chris Young solo shot. Five of the last seven losses by Boston were decided by just one run. Clay Buchholz allowed just one run over 6 2/3 innings, despite giving up 8 hits. Chris Young homered in back-to-back games and went back-to-back in this game with Jackie Bradley Jr. to secure the win. In the final interleague game of the season, David Price fanned 8 San Diego batters in 7 innings of work. Boston took a fourth inning 5–2 lead and never looked back. The Red Sox took sole possession of first place in the highly contested AL East for the first time since July 21. The first four teams are all within 4 games, while all other division leaders enjoy at least a five-game lead over their respective second place contender. Boston allowed a season-low five runs in a three-game series in back-to-back series.
Red Sox won the series 2–1 (13–5 runs)
September 9–11, in Toronto
Rick Porcello pitched seven innings, struck out seven, and was aided by 13 runs as he cruised to his twentieth win of the season in the Friday opener, the first 20-game winner for the Red Sox since Josh Beckett in 2007. The hot bats did not carry over to game two and Boston lost another one-run game. Eduardo Rodríguez went six innings and allowed three runs, two earned, on four hits. Game three saw eighteen pitchers used by both teams. The respective starters did not make it through the fourth inning, each allowing six runs. Toronto put a five-spot on the board in the third inning, to take a two-run lead, only to give it right away in the fourth and reclaiming it in the bottom of the inning. Hanley Ramírez made it a one-run game in the fifth on a solo shot and with runners on first and second in the sixth, John Gibbons summoned Joaquín Benoit from the bullpen to face David Ortiz, the same pitcher he hit a grand slam off in game two of the 2013 ALCS, which was the turning point of the series. Ortiz hammered the second pitch into the right field stands to put the Red Sox up for good in this game. He passed Jimmie Foxx in the all-time home run list with 535.
Red Sox won the series 2–1 (26–14 runs)
September 12–14, vs. Baltimore
Boston scored four times after only 11 pitches by former teammate Wade Miley. The Red Sox put on runs on the board in each of the first seven innings. David Price remained sharp and went 8 innings of two-run, two-hit ball. Price won his last seven outings, in which he went a combined 50 innings, with a 2.16 ERA and a 0.82 WHIP along with 51 strikeouts. David Ortiz tied Mickey Mantle in the all-time home run list with 536. Drew Pomeranz dug a five-run hole in the second inning, too big to overcome in game 2 of the series. With bases loaded and one out, the Red Sox only scored on two one-out walks to continue their bases loaded struggles, hitting just .217 and slugging .364 in those spots, below the major league average of .267 and .421 respectively. The bullpen remained sharp with a league leading .94 ERA over 28 2/3 frames in September, allowing just one run in seven innings of relief. Rick Porcello's win streak at home ended at 13. He allowed just one run in eight innings of work but Kevin Gausman kept the Red Sox hitters guessing all night long. Boston could not capitalize on the Blue Jays series loss against the Rays and are, with 17 games remaining, just one game ahead of the Orioles.
Red Sox lost the series 1–2 (19–9 runs)
September 15–18, vs. New York
The Red Sox rallied for one run in the eighth inning and exploded for five in the ninth in the opener of this four-game series, destroying a 5–1 New York lead to win 7–5. Hanley Ramírez sent the Fenway faithful home happy with a walk-off three-run home run to complete the comeback. With an early two-run cushion, Clay Buchholz went six innings and allowed two runs. The offense added another five runs. After giving up a one out-two run-home run, Fernando Abad was relieved by Craig Kimbrel who got the two-out save. Down 2–5 after four frames, the Red Sox rallied for two in the fifth, and two in the seventh to take the lead. Craig Kimbrel was summoned for a four-out save and struck out all batters he faced. In game four, New York again took an early lead, 4–0 in the fourth. Led by a Hanley Ramírez two-home run performance, the Red Sox came from behind again to complete the four-game sweep. The first four-game sweep over their rival since 1990. Boston became the first team since the Orioles in 2010, to overcome three deficits of three or more runs in a single series.
Red Sox won the series 4–0 (25–18 runs)
September 19–22, in Baltimore
Rick Porcello pitched his third complete game of the season for his 21st win on just 89 pitches. He allowed two runs on four hits and struck out seven. Mookie Betts went deep for the eighth time this season in Camden Yards to give the Red Sox a third inning 2–0 lead. Dustin Pedroia plated Andrew Benintendi and David Ortiz homered for the 35th time to pad the lead to 5–1 in the fifth. In game two, Mookie Betts became the first major league player with 200 hits, 100 RBI and 100 runs scored since Miguel Cabrera won the triple crown in 2012. David Ortiz opened the one-run game wide open with a three-run shot in the seventh. Eduardo Rodríguez bounced back from his performance against the Yankees, and went 6 1/3 innings, allowing two runs on 4 hits. The Orioles took a 1–0 lead in game three into the sixth, avoiding two bases loaded situations in the first and fourth inning. In the sixth, Jackie Bradley Jr. struck out with the bases loaded and one out. Sandy León hit a ground ball to Chris Davis at first, but he threw it past the pitcher Brad Brach and two runs scored. On the very next pitch Andrew Benintendi drove the ball out of Camden Yards for his second career home run. Clay Buchholz just allowed the one run on three hits in seven innings and Boston won the season series against Baltimore for the first time since 2011. In the last game of the series, Buck Showalter pulled his ace Chris Tillman after 1 2/3 innings. He allowed three runs, including a bases loaded walk to David Ortiz. The O's came back on a three-run shot off of David Price by rookie Trey Mancini in the third. Andrew Benintendi drove in Travis Shaw in the fifth, which was the difference in this game. Hanley Ramírez continued his hot September, with his 29th home run of the season and his 10th in the month, to give the Red Sox some insurance. Price went seven innings and was backed up by Koji Uehara and Craig Kimbrel, who struck out a combined four batters. The Red Sox swept back-to-back four-game series for the first time since July 1 through 7 in 1968, against the Athletics and Twins. Boston went from 2 games back, to start the month, to a 5 1/2 game lead over the Blue Jays in the AL East, with only nine games left on the season. They lowered the magic number to clinch the division from 17 to 5 over the past two series.
Red Sox won the series 4–0 (20–8 runs)
September 23–25, in St. Petersburg
David Ortiz hammered an absolute moonshot in the first inning, driving in Xander Bogaerts, which proved to be the difference in the low-scoring game. Mikie Mahtook scored the only run for the Rays in the second inning. Rick Porcello earned his 22nd win in game two of the series. Down by one run coming into the seventh, the Red Sox loaded the bases and Dustin Pedroia went deep for his 4th career grand slam. With the win, Boston clinched the first postseason berth since 2013. In game three, Boston pitching struck out 23 batters, 11 in a row at one point, a new major league record. Striking out 21 batters in nine innings, would have also been a new record, but the game went into extra innings tied at 2. In the top of the tenth, Dustin Pedroia hustled from first on a David Ortiz double. The throw beat him, but he evaded the tag by Rays rookie catcher Luke Maile multiple times. Pedroia was eventually tagged before he could touch home plate, but the ball came loose on the tag and he was ruled safe. The Red Sox tied the Rangers for the best record in the American League and lowered their magic number to 2 with six games left to play. Boston swept three consecutive series for the first time since June 2011, when they won nine in a row against the Athletics, Yankees and Blue Jays.
Red Sox won the series 3–0 (11–7 runs)
September 27–29, in the Bronx
The Red Sox tied the game at four in the top of the seventh inning. John Farrell let David Price pitch into the seventh inning and gave up three hits, including a two-run home run, before recording one out and he was done for the night. The bullpen held the Yankees scoreless but the offense couldn't score either. In game two, Boston came into the ninth with a 3–0 lead, but Craig Kimbrel could not record an out. He walked three and gave up a hit. Joe Kelly recorded two outs, before he gave up the game winning grand slam. Despite the loss, the Red Sox clinched the division with the help of the Orioles, who beat the Blue Jays. Xander Bogaerts went deep to score the only run in the 1–5 loss. In his final series in the Bronx, David Ortiz went 0–10.
Red Sox lost the series 0–3 (8–16 runs)
September 30–October 2, vs. Toronto
Xander Bogaerts tripled for the first time this season and David Ortiz drove in three runs to propel the Red Sox past the Blue Jays in the series opener. In game two, the Red Sox tied the game in the eighth inning, but Craig Kimbrel walked the lead-off batter in the ninth who came around to score on a sacrifice bunt, a wild pitch and a sacrifice fly. This was the difference in the game. In a low-scoring final game of the regular season, Boston lost home field advantage in the ALDS to the Indians. Drew Pomeranz pitched 1 1/3 perfect innings out of the bullpen, his expected role in the coming postseason. Hanley Ramírez joined David Ortiz and Mookie Betts to drive in 100 runs and hit 30 home runs.
Red Sox lost the series 1–2 (9–9 runs)
Composite line score September/October

Team	1	2	3	4	5	6	7	8	9	10	R	H	E
Opponent	8	13	22	14	9	5	4	5	11	0	91	208	24
Boston	19	12	18	14	18	21	30	11	10	1	154	267	9

=== 2016 season ===
The Red Sox opened the season with an 8–9 record but turned it around against the Braves and a sweep against the Yankees. After a strong May, where they played .643, Boston fell into a slump in June. They headed into the month with a three-game lead over the Orioles; by June 29 they were 5 1/2 games behind Baltimore. The Red Sox only lost three games in the first 15 games in July, and took sole possession of the division on July 20, with a 1/2 game lead, but finished the month 1 1/2 games back, on place three behind the Orioles and Blue Jays. During the month of August, Boston took advantage of an Orioles slump but lost 1/2 a game to the Blue Jays. Playing meaningful games in September for the first time since 2013, Boston took the lead in the AL East on September 7 and never looked back. On September 26, after an 11-game winning streak, they widened the lead to six games and finished with fours game over the Orioles. Boston lost home field advantage to the Rangers and Indians after winning only one game in their last six.

Composite line score Total

Team	1	2	3	4	5	6	7	8	9	10	11	12	R	H	E
Opponent	84	70	94	88	82	68	79	75	45	8	1	0	694	1342	101
Boston	116	94	110	83	117	123	92	76	57	4	4	2	878	1598	75

== Playoffs ==
=== 2016 American League Division Series vs. Cleveland Indians ===
==== Game 1, October 6 ====
8:08 p.m. (EDT) at Progressive Field in Cleveland, Ohio

Team	1	2	3	4	5	6	7	8	9	R	H	E
Boston	1	0	1	0	1	0	0	1	0	4	10	0
Cleveland	0	1	3	0	1	0	0	0	0	5	10	0
WP: Andrew Miller (1–0) LP: Rick Porcello (0–1) Sv: Cody Allen (1); Home runs: BOS: Andrew Benintendi (1), Sandy León (1), Brock Holt (1); CLE: Roberto Pérez (1), Jason Kipnis (1), Francisco Lindor (1)

The Red Sox jumped out to a first inning 1–0 lead, but Rick Porcello's 22–4 regular season record would prove irrelevant as he couldn't contain the Tribe offense. Cleveland tagged the Boston starter for three home runs in the third inning, two of them back-to-back. The Sox bullpen was decent in keeping additional runs off the board and giving Boston's hitters a chance to respond, but a brief rally in the eighth fell just short. The Indians' early offensive explosion had created a jubilant atmosphere at Progressive Field that would rattle the Red Sox offense for the remainder for the game.

Red Sox Pitchers	IP	H	R	ER	BB	SO	HR	ERA
Rick Porcello (L, 0–1)	4 1/3	6	5	5	0	6	3	10.38
Drew Pomeranz	2 1/3	3	0	0	1	5	0	0.00
Joe Kelly	1/3	0	0	0	0	1	0	0.00
Koji Uehara	1	1	0	0	0	0	0	0.00

==== Game 2, October 7 ====
4:38 p.m. (EDT) at Progressive Field in Cleveland, Ohio

Team	1	2	3	4	5	6	7	8	9	R	H	E
Boston	0	0	0	0	0	0	0	0	0	0	3	1
Cleveland	0	4	0	1	0	1	0	0	0	6	9	0
WP: Corey Kluber (1–0) LP: David Price (0–1); Home runs: BOS: None; CLE: Lonnie Chisenhall (1)

After a quick 8-pitch first inning, the Indians tagged David Price for four runs in the second inning. He was eventually pulled in the fourth inning, to finish his worst postseason start of his career. The Red Sox were held scoreless by Indians pitching and face elimination for the remainder of the ALDS.

Red Sox Pitchers	IP	H	R	ER	BB	SO	HR	ERA
David Price (L, 0–1)	3 1/3	6	5	5	2	3	1	13.50
Matt Barnes	1 2/3	3	1	0	0	1	0	0.00
Robbie Ross Jr.	0 1/3	0	0	0	0	1	0	0.00
Brad Ziegler	0 2/3	0	0	0	1	1	0	0.00
Joe Kelly	1 2/3	0	0	0	0	1	0	0.00
Craig Kimbrel	0 1/3	0	0	0	0	1	0	0.00

==== Game 3, October 10 ====
6:08 p.m. (EDT) at Fenway Park in Boston, Massachusetts

Team	1	2	3	4	5	6	7	8	9	R	H	E
Cleveland	0	0	0	2	0	2	0	0	0	4	7	0
Boston	0	0	0	0	1	1	0	1	0	3	8	0
WP: Josh Tomlin (1–0) LP: Clay Buchholz (0–1) Sv: Cody Allen (2); Home runs: CLE: Coco Crisp (1); BOS: None

Red Sox Pitchers	IP	H	R	ER	BB	SO	HR	ERA
Clay Buchholz (L, 0–1)	4	6	2	2	1	4	0	4.50
Drew Pomeranz	1 1/3	1	2	2	1	2	1	4.91
Joe Kelly	1 2/3	0	0	0	0	1	0	0.00
Koji Uehara	1	0	0	0	0	1	0	0.00
Craig Kimbrel	1	0	0	0	0	2	0	0.00

==== Composite line score ====
Team	1	2	3	4	5	6	7	8	9	R	H	E
Cleveland	0	5	3	3	1	3	0	0	0	15	26	0
Boston	1	0	1	0	2	1	0	2	0	7	21	1

=== Postseason rosters ===
Playoff rosters
American League Division Series

- Pitchers: 11 Clay Buchholz 19 Koji Uehara 22 Rick Porcello 24 David Price 28 Robbie Ross Jr. 29 Brad Ziegler 31 Drew Pomeranz 46 Craig Kimbrel 52 Eduardo Rodríguez 56 Joe Kelly 68 Matt Barnes
- Catchers: 3 Sandy León 7 Christian Vázquez
- Infielders: 2 Xander Bogaerts 12 Brock Holt 13 Hanley Ramírez 15 Dustin Pedroia 18 Aaron Hill 41 Marco Hernández 47 Travis Shaw
- Outfielders: 25 Jackie Bradley Jr. 30 Chris Young 40 Andrew Benintendi 50 Mookie Betts
- Designated hitters: 34 David Ortiz

== Season standings ==
=== American League East ===
AL East
Team	W	L	Pct.	GB	Home	Road
Boston Red Sox	93	69	.574	—	47‍–‍34	46‍–‍35
Toronto Blue Jays	89	73	.549	4	51‍–‍30	38‍–‍43
Baltimore Orioles	89	73	.549	4	50‍–‍31	39‍–‍42
New York Yankees	84	78	.519	9	48‍–‍33	36‍–‍45
Tampa Bay Rays	68	94	.420	25	36‍–‍45	32‍–‍49

=== American League Wild Card ===
Division leaders
Team	W	L	Pct.
Texas Rangers	95	67	.586
Cleveland Indians	94	67	.584
Boston Red Sox	93	69	.574

Wild Card teams (Top 2 teams qualify for postseason)
Team	W	L	Pct.	GB
Toronto Blue Jays	89	73	.549	—
Baltimore Orioles	89	73	.549	—
Detroit Tigers	86	75	.534	2½
Seattle Mariners	86	76	.531	3
New York Yankees	84	78	.519	5
Houston Astros	84	78	.519	5
Kansas City Royals	81	81	.500	8
Chicago White Sox	78	84	.481	11
Los Angeles Angels	74	88	.457	15
Oakland Athletics	69	93	.426	20
Tampa Bay Rays	68	94	.420	21
Minnesota Twins	59	103	.364	30

=== Red Sox team leaders ===
Batting
Batting average†	Mookie Betts	.318
Runs scored	Mookie Betts	122
Stolen bases	Mookie Betts	26
Home runs	David Ortiz	38
RBIs	David Ortiz	127
Pitching
Wins	Rick Porcello	22
ERA‡	Rick Porcello	3.15
WHIP‡	Rick Porcello	1.01
Strikeouts	David Price	228
Saves	Craig Kimbrel	31

† Minimum 3.1 plate appearances per team games played
AVG qualified batters: Betts, Bogaerts, Bradley, Ortiz, Pedroia, Ramirez, Shaw
Betts batted 214-for-672 (.31845) and Pedroia batted 201-for-633 (.31754)
‡ Minimum 1 inning pitched per team games played
ERA & WHIP qualified pitchers: Porcello, Price

=== Record against opponents ===
2016 American League record Source: MLB Standings Grid – 2016
Team	BAL	BOS	CWS	CLE	DET	HOU	KC	LAA	MIN	NYY	OAK	SEA	TB	TEX	TOR	NL
Baltimore	—	8–11	4–3	5–1	5–2	1–6	4–2	4–2	5–1	10–9	3–4	1–6	13–6	3–4	9–10	14–6
Boston	11–8	—	3–4	4–2	2–5	5–2	2–4	4–3	4–3	11–8	5–1	4–3	12–7	3–3	9–10	14–6
Chicago	3–4	4–3	—	8–11	7–12	3–3	5–14	2–5	12–7	3–3	5–2	4–3	4–3	4–2	5–1	9–11
Cleveland	1–5	2–4	11–8	—	14–4	3–4	14–5	6–1	10–9	2–5	4–2	3–4	5–1	2–5	4–3	13–7
Detroit	2–5	5–2	12–7	4–14	—	4–2	7–12	2–4	15–4	3–3	4–3	4–3	6–1	2–4	3–4	13–7
Houston	6–1	2–5	3–3	4–3	2–4	—	3–4	13–6	5–2	2–4	13–6	11–8	3–3	4–15	2–5	11–9
Kansas City	2–4	4–2	14–5	5–14	12–7	4–3	—	1–5	15–4	2–5	1–6	3–4	5–2	1–6	2–4	10–10
Los Angeles	2–4	3–4	5–2	1–6	4–2	6–13	5–1	—	2–4	1–6	12–7	8–11	3–4	9–10	4–3	9–11
Minnesota	1–5	3–4	7–12	9–10	4–15	2–5	4–15	4–2	—	2–5	2–4	4–2	3–4	5–2	1–6	8–12
New York	9–10	8–11	3–3	5–2	3–3	4–2	5–2	6–1	5–2	—	4–3	3–3	11–8	3–4	7–12	8–12
Oakland	4–3	1–5	2–5	2–4	3–4	6–13	6–1	7–12	4–2	3–4	—	7–12	5–2	9–10	3–3	7–13
Seattle	6–1	3–4	3–4	4–3	3–4	8–11	4–3	11–8	2–4	3–3	12–7	—	4–2	7–12	3–3	13–7
Tampa Bay	6–13	7–12	3–4	1–5	1–6	3–3	2–5	4–3	4–3	8–11	2–5	2–4	—	4–2	11–8	10–10
Texas	4–3	3–3	2–4	5–2	4–2	15–4	6–1	10–9	2–5	4–3	10–9	12–7	2–4	—	3–4	13–7
Toronto	10–9	10–9	1–5	3–4	4–3	5–2	4–2	3–4	6–1	12–7	3–3	3–3	8–11	4–3	—	13–7

Red Sox vs. National League
Team	NL West					
Team	ARI	COL	LAD	SDP	SFG	ATL
Boston	3–0	2–1	1–2	2–1	3–1	3–1

== Roster ==
2016 Boston Red Sox
Roster
Pitchers: 43,58 Fernando Abad; 68 Matt Barnes; 11 Clay Buchholz; 63 William Cuevas; 29,51 Roenis Elías; 37 Heath Hembree; 56 Joe Kelly; 46 Craig Kimbrel; 59 Tommy Layne; 43,65 Pat Light; 62 Sean O'Sullivan; 60 Henry Owens; 31 Drew Pomeranz; 22 Rick Porcello; 24 David Price; 66 Noé Ramirez; 52 Eduardo Rodríguez; 28 Robbie Ross; 72 Robby Scott; 39 Carson Smith; 36 Junichi Tazawa; 19 Koji Uehara; 35 Steven Wright; 29 Brad Ziegler	Catchers: 10 Ryan Hanigan; 59 Bryan Holaday; 3 Sandy León; 23 Blake Swihart; 7 Christian Vázquez; Infielders: 2 Xander Bogaerts; 41 Marco Hernández; 18 Aaron Hill; 16 Deven Marrero; 40 Mike Miller; 65 Yoan Moncada; 34 David Ortiz; 15 Dustin Pedroia; 13 Hanley Ramírez; 32 Josh Rutledge; 48 Pablo Sandoval; 47 Travis Shaw	Outfielders: 40 Andrew Benintendi; 50 Mookie Betts; 25 Jackie Bradley Jr.; 64 Bryce Brentz; 38 Rusney Castillo; 12 Brock Holt; 65 Ryan LaMarre; 40 Michael Martínez; 30 Chris Young	Manager: 53 John Farrell; Coaches: 20 Rubén Amaro Jr. (first base); 87 Mike Brenly (bullpen catcher); 55 Brian Butterfield (third base); 44 Chili Davis (hitting); 58,43 Dana LeVangie (bullpen); 17 Torey Lovullo (bench); 57 Vic Rodriguez (assistant hitting); 54 Carl Willis (pitching)

== Game log ==
Past games legend
Red Sox Win (#bfb)	Red Sox Loss (#fbb)	Game postponed (#bbb)	Clinched Playoff Spot (#039)	Clinched Division (#090)
Boldface text denotes a Red Sox pitcher

Boston Red Sox 2016 Season Game Log — Season Record: (93–69)
April (14–10)

#	Date Time (ET)	Opponent	Score	Win	Loss	Save	Stadium	Attendance	Record	Box/ Streak
—	April 4	@ Indians	Postponed (cold). Makeup date: April 5.							
1	April 5	@ Indians	6–2	**Price** (1–0)	Kluber (0–1)		Progressive Field	34,493	1–0	W1
2	April 6	@ Indians	6–7	McAllister (1–0)	**Tazawa** (0–1)	Allen (1)	Progressive Field	10,298	1–1	L1
—	April 7	@ Indians	Postponed (rain). Makeup date: August 15.							
3	April 8	@ Blue Jays	8–7	**Barnes** (1–0)	Storen (0–1)	**Kimbrel** (1)	Rogers Centre	48,871	2–1	W1
4	April 9	@ Blue Jays	8–4	**Porcello** (1–0)	Dickey (1–1)		Rogers Centre	47,138	3–1	W2
5	April 10	@ Blue Jays	0–3	Estrada (1–0)	**Wright** (0–1)	Osuna (3)	Rogers Centre	46,168	3–2	L1
6	April 11	Orioles	7–9	Brach (2–0)	**Kimbrel** (0–1)	Britton (3)	**Fenway Park**	37,160	3–3	L2
7	April 12	Orioles	5–9	Wright (1–0)	**Buchholz** (0–1)		**Fenway Park**	31,114	3–4	L3
8	April 13	Orioles	4–2	**Kelly** (1–0)	Jiménez (1–1)	**Kimbrel** (2)	**Fenway Park**	31,011	4–4	W1
9	April 15	Blue Jays	5–3	**Porcello** (2–0)	Dickey (1–2)	**Kimbrel** (3)	**Fenway Park**	31,415	5–4	W2
10	April 16	Blue Jays	4–2	**Price** (2–0)	Estrada (1–1)	**Kimbrel** (4)	**Fenway Park**	36,267	6–4	W3
11	April 17	Blue Jays	3–5	Sanchez (1–0)	**Wright** (0–2)		**Fenway Park**	37,217	6–5	L1
12	April 18	Blue Jays	3–4	Happ (2–0)	**Uehara** (0–1)	Storen (1)	**Fenway Park**	37,168	6–6	L2
13	April 19	Rays	0–3 (10)	Ramírez (3–0)	**Barnes** (1–1)	Colomé (2)	**Fenway Park**	32,061	6–7	L3
14	April 20	Rays	7–3	**Porcello** (3–0)	Archer (0–4)		**Fenway Park**	31,689	7–7	W1
15	April 21	Rays	8–12	Ramírez (4–0)	**Cuevas** (0–1)	Colomé (3)	**Fenway Park**	37,954	7–8	L1
16	April 22	@ Astros	6–2	**Wright** (1–2)	McHugh (1–3)	**Kimbrel** (5)	Minute Maid Park	26,672	8–8	W1
17	April 23	@ Astros	3–8	Fiers (2–1)	**Buchholz** (0–2)		Minute Maid Park	40,232	8–9	L1
18	April 24	@ Astros	7–5 (12)	**Hembree** (1–0)	Giles (0–2)		Minute Maid Park	32,416	9–9	W1
19	April 25	@ Braves	1–0	**Porcello** (4–0)	Teherán (0–3)	**Kimbrel** (6)	Turner Field	22,735	10–9	W2
20	April 26	@ Braves	11–4	**Price** (3–0)	Wisler (0–2)		Turner Field	23,487	11–9	W3
21	April 27	Braves	9–4	**Wright** (2–2)	Norris (1–4)		**Fenway Park**	33,380	12–9	W4
22	April 28	Braves	3–5	Chacín (1–1)	**Buchholz** (0–3)	Vizcaíno (2)	**Fenway Park**	32,232	12–10	L1
23	April 29	Yankees	4–2	**Uehara** (1–1)	Betances (0–2)	**Kimbrel** (7)	**Fenway Park**	37,115	13–10	W1
24	April 30	Yankees	8–0	**Porcello** (5–0)	Pineda (1–3)		**Fenway Park**	37,901	14–10	W2

May (18–10)

#	Date Time (ET)	Opponent	Score	Win	Loss	Save	Stadium	Attendance	Record	Box/ Streak
25	May 1	Yankees	8–7	**Price** (4–0)	Nova (1–1)	**Kimbrel** (8)	**Fenway Park**	34,279	15–10	W3
26	May 3	@ White Sox	1–4	Quintana (4–1)	**Wright** (2–3)	Robertson (9)	U.S. Cellular Field	15,025	15–11	L1
27	May 4	@ White Sox	5–2	**Buchholz** (1–3)	Rodon (1–4)	**Kimbrel** (9)	U.S. Cellular Field	14,383	16–11	W1
28	May 5	@ White Sox	7–3	**Barnes** (2–1)	Johnson (0–1)		U.S. Cellular Field	20,126	17–11	W2
29	May 6	@ Yankees	2–3	Yates (1–0)	**Porcello** (5–1)	Miller (6)	Yankee Stadium	45,756	17–12	L1
30	May 7	@ Yankees	2–8	Eovaldi (2–2)	**Price** (4–1)		Yankee Stadium	47,822	17–13	L2
31	May 8	@ Yankees	5–1	**Wright** (3–3)	Severino (0–5)		Yankee Stadium	41,869	18–13	W1
32	May 9	Athletics	14–7	**Buchholz** (2–3)	Gray (3–4)		**Fenway Park**	35,227	19–13	W2
33	May 10	Athletics	13–5	**O'Sullivan** (1–0)	Manaea (0–1)		**Fenway Park**	32,167	20–13	W3
34	May 11	Athletics	13–3	**Porcello** (6–1)	Surkamp (0–3)		**Fenway Park**	33,283	21–13	W4
35	May 12	Astros	11–1	**Price** (5–1)	Keuchel (2–5)		**Fenway Park**	34,982	22–13	W5
36	May 13	Astros	6–7	Feldman (2–2)	**Barnes** (2–2)	Gregerson (9)	**Fenway Park**	33,148	22–14	L1
37	May 14	Astros	6–5 (11)	**Uehara** (2–1)	Feliz (1–1)		**Fenway Park**	37,430	23–14	W1
38	May 15	Astros	10–9	**Hembree** (2–0)	Feldman (2–3)	**Kimbrel** (10)	**Fenway Park**	35,736	24–14	W2
–	May 16	@ Royals	Postponed (rain). Makeup: May 18 as part of a day-night doubleheader							
39	May 17	@ Royals	4–8	Ventura (4–2)	**Porcello** (6–2)		Kauffman Stadium	25,215	24–15	L1
40	May 18	@ Royals	2–3	Flynn (1–0)	**Wright** (3–4)	Davis (9)	Kauffman Stadium	33,613	24–16	L2
41	May 18	@ Royals	5–2	**Price** (6–1)	Vólquez (4–4)	**Kimbrel** (11)	Kauffman Stadium	23,739	25–16	W1
42	May 20	Indians	2–4	Kluber (3–5)	**Buchholz** (2–4)	Allen (10)	**Fenway Park**	37,354	25–17	L1
43	May 21	Indians	9–1	**Kelly** (2–0)	Bauer (3–2)		**Fenway Park**	37,254	26–17	W1
44	May 22	Indians	5–2	**Porcello** (7–2)	Salazar (4–3)	**Kimbrel** (12)	**Fenway Park**	36,021	27–17	W2
45	May 24	Rockies	8–3	**Price** (7–1)	de la Rosa (1–4)		**Fenway Park**	36,123	28–17	W3
46	May 25	Rockies	10–3	**Wright** (4–4)	Bettis (4–3)		**Fenway Park**	36,430	29–17	W4
47	May 26	Rockies	2–8	Gray (2–2)	**Buchholz** (2–5)		**Fenway Park**	36,162	29–18	L1
48	May 27	@ Blue Jays	5–7	Biagini (2–1)	**Uehara** (2–2)	Osuna (11)	Rogers Centre	46,470	29–19	L2
49	May 28	@ Blue Jays	9–10	Floyd (2–3)	**Kimbrel** (0–2)		Rogers Centre	48,154	29–20	L3
50	May 29	@ Blue Jays	5–3 (11)	**Buchholz** (3–5)	Floyd (2–4)	**Uehara** (1)	Rogers Centre	47,916	30–20	W1
51	May 30	@ Orioles	7–2	**Wright** (5–4)	Wilson (2–4)		Camden Yards	43,926	31–20	W2
52	May 31	@ Orioles	6–2	**Rodríguez** (1–0)	Gausman (0–2)		Camden Yards	17,664	32–20	W3

June (10–16)

#	Date	Opponent	Score	Win	Loss	Save	Stadium	Attendance	Record	Box/ Streak
53	June 1	@ Orioles	9–13	Brach (5–0)	**Buchholz** (3–6)	Britton (15)	Camden Yards	20,750	32–21	L1
54	June 2	@ Orioles	7–12	Givens (4–0)	**Ross** (0–1)		Camden Yards	21,534	32–22	L2
55	June 3	Blue Jays	2–5	Dickey (3–6)	**Price** (7–2)	Osuna (13)	**Fenway Park**	37,129	32–23	L3
56	June 4	Blue Jays	6–4	**Wright** (6–4)	Stroman (5–2)	**Kimbrel** (13)	**Fenway Park**	37,762	33–23	W1
57	June 5	Blue Jays	4–5	Estrada (4–2)	**Rodríguez** (1–1)		**Fenway Park**	35,823	33–24	L1
58	June 7	@ Giants	5–3 (10)	**Tazawa** (1–1)	Casilla (1–1)	**Kimbrel** (14)	AT&T Park	41,512	34–24	W1
59	June 8	@ Giants	1–2	Gearrin (2–0)	**Price** (7–3)	Strickland (1)	AT&T Park	41,635	34–25	L1
60	June 10	@ Twins	8–1	**Wright** (7–4)	Duffey (2–5)		Target Field	22,786	35–25	W1
61	June 11	@ Twins	15–4	**Hembree** (3–0)	Gibson (0–4)		Target Field	28,633	36–25	W2
62	June 12	@ Twins	4–7 (10)	Tonkin (2–2)	**Barnes** (2–3)		Target Field	26,087	36–26	L1
63	June 14	Orioles	2–3	Tillman (9–1)	**Price** (7–4)	Britton (20)	**Fenway Park**	38,009	36–27	L2
64	June 15	Orioles	6–4	**Wright** (8–4)	Gausman (0–4)	**Kimbrel** (15)	**Fenway Park**	36,233	37–27	W1
65	June 16	Orioles	1–5	Wilson (3–5)	**Rodríguez** (1–2)		**Fenway Park**	36,757	37–28	L1
66	June 17	Mariners	4–8	Iwakuma (6–5)	**Elías** (0–1)		**Fenway Park**	35,896	37–29	L2
67	June 18	Mariners	6–2	**Porcello** (8–2)	Sampson (0–1)		**Fenway Park**	37,195	38–29	W1
68	June 19	Mariners	2–1	**Price** (8–4)	Díaz (0–1)	**Kimbrel** (16)	**Fenway Park**	37,211	39–29	W2
69	June 20	White Sox	1–3 (10)	Duke (2–0)	**Kimbrel** (0–3)	Robertson (17)	**Fenway Park**	36,291	39–30	L1
70	June 21	White Sox	1–3	Sale (12–2)	**Buchholz** (3–7)	Robertson (18)	**Fenway Park**	36,544	39–31	L2
71	June 22	White Sox	6–8	Jennings (3–1)	**Uehara** (2–3)	Duke (1)	**Fenway Park**	37,413	39–32	L3
72	June 23	White Sox	8–7	**Kimbrel** (1–3)	Purke (0–1)	–	**Fenway Park**	37,790	40–32	W1
73	June 24	@ Rangers	8–7	**Hembree** (4–0)	Bush (2–1)	**Uehara** (2)	Globe Life Park	46,811	41–32	W2
74	June 25	@ Rangers	3–10	Ramos (2–3)	**Wright** (8–5)		Globe Life Park	47,559	41–33	L1
75	June 26	@ Rangers	2–6	Pérez (7–4)	**Buchholz** (3–8)		Globe Life Park	36,312	41–34	L2
76	June 27	@ Rays	7–13	Snell (1–2)	**Rodríguez** (1–3)		Tropicana Field	18,024	41–35	L3
77	June 28	@ Rays	8–2	**Porcello** (9–2)	Archer (4–11)		Tropicana Field	16,986	42–35	W1
78	June 29	@ Rays	0–4	Moore (4–5)	**Price** (8–5)		Tropicana Field	24,110	42–36	L1

July (15–10)

#	Date	Opponent	Score	Win	Loss	Save	Stadium	Attendance	Record	Box/ Streak
79	July 1	Angels	5–4	**Wright** (9–5)	Chacín (3–7)	**Kimbrel** (17)	**Fenway Park**	37,117	43–36	W1
80	July 2	Angels	2–21	Santiago (5–4)	**Buchholz** (3–9)		**Fenway Park**	36,552	43–37	L1
81	July 3	Angels	10–5	**O'Sullivan** (2–0)	Shoemaker (3–9)		**Fenway Park**	36,801	44–37	W1
82	July 4	Rangers	12–5	**Porcello** (10–2)	Martinez (1–2)		**Fenway Park**	36,253	45–37	W2
83	July 5	Rangers	2–7	Ramos (3–3)	**Price** (8–6)		**Fenway Park**	35,964	45–38	L1
84	July 6	Rangers	11–6	**Wright** (10–5)	Pérez (7–5)		**Fenway Park**	37,175	46–38	W1
85	July 8	Rays	6–5	**Ross** (1–1)	Archer (4–12)	**Uehara** (3)	**Fenway Park**	37,739	47–38	W2
86	July 9	Rays	4–1	**Porcello** (11–2)	Moore (5–6)	**Uehara** (4)	**Fenway Park**	36,900	48–38	W3
87	July 10	Rays	4–0	**Price** (9–6)	Odorizzi (3–5)		**Fenway Park**	36,669	49–38	W4
ASG	July 12	All-Star Game	**AL** 4–2 NL	Kluber (AL, CLE)	Cueto (NL, SF)	Britton (AL, BAL)	Petco Park, SD, CA	42,386		Box
88	July 15	@ Yankees	5–3	**Wright** (11–5)	Pineda (3–9)	**Uehara** (5)	Yankee Stadium	47,439	50–38	W5
89	July 16	@ Yankees	5–2	**Rodríguez** (2–3)	Sabathia (5–7)	**Uehara** (6)	Yankee Stadium	48,329	51–38	W6
90	July 17	@ Yankees	1–3	Tanaka (7–2)	**Price** (9–7)	Chapman (18)	Yankee Stadium	42,884	51–39	L1
91	July 19	Giants	4–0	**Porcello** (12–2)	Peavy (5–8)		**Fenway Park**	38,082	52–39	W1
92	July 20	Giants	11–7	**Barnes** (3–3)	Cain (1–6)		**Fenway Park**	38,201	53–39	W2
93	July 21	Twins	13–2	**Wright** (12–5)	Duffey (5–7)		**Fenway Park**	37,566	54–39	W3
94	July 22	Twins	1–2	Gibson (3–6)	**Rodríguez** (2–4)	Kintzler (7)	**Fenway Park**	37,001	54–40	L1
95	July 23	Twins	9–11	Pressly (4–5)	**Layne** (0–1)	Kintzler (8)	**Fenway Park**	37,600	54–41	L2
96	July 24	Twins	8–7	**Porcello** (13–2)	Milone (3–3)	**Ziegler** (19)	**Fenway Park**	36,806	55–41	W1
97	July 25	Tigers	2–4	Verlander (10–6)	**Pomeranz** (8–8)	Rodríguez (28)	**Fenway Park**	37,479	55–42	L1
98	July 26	Tigers	8–9	Wilson (1–0)	**Ross** (1–2)	Rodríguez (29)	**Fenway Park**	38,378	55–43	L2
99	July 27	Tigers	3–4	Rondón (4–2)	**Ziegler** (0–1)	Wilson (1)	**Fenway Park**	37,842	55–44	L3
100	July 28	@ Angels	1–2	Bedrosian (2–0)	**Ziegler** (0–2)		Angel Stadium of Anaheim	41,257	55–45	L4
101	July 29	@ Angels	6–2	**Porcello** (14–2)	Lincecum (2–5)		Angel Stadium of Anaheim	39,113	56–45	W1
102	July 30	@ Angels	2–5	Santiago (10–4)	**Pomeranz** (8–9)	Street (9)	Angel Stadium of Anaheim	43,150	56–46	L1
103	July 31	@ Angels	5–3	**Buchholz** (4–9)	Street (3–2)	**Ziegler** (20)	Angel Stadium of Anaheim	39,553	57–46	W1

August (17–13)

#	Date	Opponent	Score	Win	Loss	Save	Stadium	Attendance	Record	Box/ Streak
104	August 1	@ Mariners	2–1	**Tazawa** (2–1)	Cishek (2–6)	**Kimbrel** (18)	Safeco Field	29,601	58–46	W2
105	August 2	@ Mariners	4–5	Roach (2–0)	**Abad** (1–5)	Díaz (1)	Safeco Field	25,240	58–47	L1
106	August 3	@ Mariners	1–3	Iwakuma (12–7)	**Porcello** (14–3)	Díaz (2)	Safeco Field	24,494	58–48	L2
107	August 4	@ Mariners	3–2 (11)	**Kimbrel** (2–3)	Martin (1–2)	**Ziegler** (21)	Safeco Field	33,369	59–48	W1
108	August 5	@ Dodgers	9–0	**Wright** (13–5)	Kazmir (9–5)		Dodger Stadium	52,738	60–48	W2
109	August 6	@ Dodgers	0–3	Stripling (3–3)	**Rodríguez** (2–5)	Jansen (33)	Dodger Stadium	47,696	60–49	L1
110	August 7	@ Dodgers	5–8	Chavez (2–2)	**Price** (9–8)	Jansen (34)	Dodger Stadium	50,640	60–50	L2
111	August 9	Yankees	5–3	**Porcello** (15–3)	Severino (1–7)	**Barnes** (1)	**Fenway Park**	38,089	61–50	W1
112	August 10	Yankees	4–9	Clippard (3–3)	**Abad** (1–6)		**Fenway Park**	37,779	61–51	L1
113	August 11	Yankees	2–4	Cessa (2–0)	**Ziegler** (0–3)	Betances (3)	**Fenway Park**	38,161	61–52	L2
114	August 12	Diamondbacks	9–4	**Price** (10–8)	Corbin (4–12)		**Fenway Park**	37,555	62–52	W1
115	August 13	Diamondbacks	6–3	**Ross** (2–2)	Bradley (4–8)	**Kimbrel** (19)	**Fenway Park**	37,653	63–52	W2
116	August 14	Diamondbacks	16–2	**Porcello** (16–3)	Greinke (11–4)		**Fenway Park**	36,842	64–52	W3
117	August 15	@ Indians	3–2	**Pomeranz** (9–9)	Tomlin (11–6)	**Kimbrel** (20)	Progressive Field	19,174	65–52	W4
118	August 16	@ Orioles	5–3	**Ziegler** (1–3)	Brach (7–2)	**Kimbrel** (21)	Camden Yards	26,014	66–52	W5
119	August 17	@ Orioles	8–1 (6)	**Price** (11–8)	Bundy (6–4)		Camden Yards	26,160	67–52	W6
120	August 18	@ Tigers	3–4	Wilson (3–4)	**Tazawa** (2–2)	Rodríguez (34)	Comerica Park	34,649	67–53	L1
121	August 19	@ Tigers	10–2	**Porcello** (17–3)	Fulmer (10–4)		Comerica Park	36,108	68–53	W1
122	August 20	@ Tigers	3–2	**Pomeranz** (10–9)	Norris (1–2)	**Kimbrel** (22)	Comerica Park	37,886	69–53	W2
123	August 21	@ Tigers	5–10	Verlander (13–7)	**Owens** (0–1)		Comerica Park	31,032	69–54	L1
124	August 22	@ Rays	6–2	**Price** (12–8)	Snell (4–6)		Tropicana Field	13,576	70–54	W1
125	August 23	@ Rays	2–1	**Buchholz** (5–9)	Archer (7–17)	**Kimbrel** (23)	Tropicana Field	11,249	71–54	W2
126	August 24	@ Rays	3–4 (11)	Boxberger (2–0)	**Hembree** (4–1)		Tropicana Field	11,896	71–55	L1
127	August 25	@ Rays	1–2	Odorizzi (9–5)	**Pomeranz** (10–10)	Romero (1)	Tropicana Field	12,059	71–56	L2
128	August 26	Royals	3–6	Kennedy (9–9)	**Wright** (13–6)	Herrera (10)	**Fenway Park**	38,134	71–57	L3
129	August 27	Royals	8–3	**Price** (13–8)	Duffy (11–2)		**Fenway Park**	37,933	72–57	W1
130	August 28	Royals	4–10	Strahm (2–0)	**Rodríguez** (2–6)		**Fenway Park**	37,337	72–58	L1
131	August 29	Rays	9–4	**Porcello** (18–3)	Andriese (6–6)		**Fenway Park**	36,948	73–58	W1
132	August 30	Rays	3–4	Romero (2–0)	**Buchholz** (5–10)	Colomé (29)	**Fenway Park**	37,083	73–59	L1
133	August 31	Rays	8–6	**Tazawa** (3–2)	Ramírez (7–10)	**Kimbrel** (24)	**Fenway Park**	36,786	74–59	W1

September / October (19–10)

#	Date	Opponent	Score	Win	Loss	Save	Stadium	Attendance	Record	Box/ Streak
134	September 2	@ Athletics	16–2	**Price** (14–8)	Neal (2–4)		Oakland Coliseum	21,376	75–59	W2
135	September 3	@ Athletics	11–2	**Porcello** (19–3)	Mengden (1–6)		Oakland Coliseum	30,045	76–59	W3
136	September 4	@ Athletics	0–1	Madson (5–4)	**Kimbrel** (2–4)		Oakland Coliseum	25,139	76–60	L1
137	September 5	@ Padres	1–2	Jackson (4–5)	**Pomeranz** (10–11)	Maurer (8)	Petco Park	40,446	76–61	L2
138	September 6	@ Padres	5–1	**Buchholz** (6–10)	Clemens (2–5)		Petco Park	30,644	77–61	W1
139	September 7	@ Padres	7–2	**Price** (15–8)	Cosart (0–3)		Petco Park	31,662	78–61	W2
140	September 9	@ Blue Jays	13–3	**Porcello** (20–3)	Estrada (8–8)		Rogers Centre	46,953	79–61	W3
141	September 10	@ Blue Jays	2–3	Happ (18–4)	**Rodríguez** (2–7)	Osuna (31)	Rogers Centre	47,829	79–62	L1
142	September 11	@ Blue Jays	11–8	**Ross** (3–2)	Schultz (0–1)	**Kimbrel** (25)	Rogers Centre	47,816	80–62	W1
143	September 12	Orioles	12–2	**Price** (16–8)	Miley (8–13)		**Fenway Park**	37,551	81–62	W2
144	September 13	Orioles	3–6	Bundy (9–5)	**Pomeranz** (10–12)	Britton (42)	**Fenway Park**	38,041	81–63	L1
145	September 14	Orioles	0–1	Gausman (8–10)	**Porcello** (20–4)	Britton (43)	**Fenway Park**	37,973	81–64	L2
146	September 15	Yankees	7–5	**Kelly** (3–0)	Betances (3–6)		**Fenway Park**	37,767	82–64	W1
147	September 16	Yankees	7–4	**Buchholz** (7–10)	Cessa (4–2)	**Kimbrel** (26)	**Fenway Park**	37,927	83–64	W2
148	September 17	Yankees	6–5	**Barnes** (4–3)	Warren (6–4)	**Kimbrel** (27)	**Fenway Park**	37,267	84–64	W3
149	September 18	Yankees	5–4	**Scott** (1–0)	Clippard (3–4)	**Uehara** (7)	**Fenway Park**	37,306	85–64	W4
150	September 19	@ Orioles	5–2	**Porcello** (21–4)	Bundy (9–6)		Camden Yards	18,456	86–64	W5
151	September 20	@ Orioles	5–2	**Rodríguez** (3–7)	Gausman (8–11)	**Kimbrel** (28)	Camden Yards	20,387	87–64	W6
152	September 21	@ Orioles	5–1	**Buchholz** (8–10)	Jiménez (7–12)		Camden Yards	20,865	88–64	W7
153	September 22	@ Orioles	5–3	**Price** (17–8)	Worley (2–2)	**Kimbrel** (29)	Camden Yards	26,788	89–64	W8
154	September 23	@ Rays	2–1	**Pomeranz** (11–12)	Archer (8–19)	**Ziegler** (22)	Tropicana Field	20,543	90–64	W9
155	September 24	@ Rays	6–4	**Porcello** (22–4)	Garton (1–2)	**Kimbrel** (30)	Tropicana Field	25,641	91–64	W10
156	September 25	@ Rays	3–2 (10)	**Kelly** (4–0)	Gamboa (0–1)		Tropicana Field	26,443	92–64	W11
157	September 27	@ Yankees	4–6	Parker (1–0)	**Price** (17–9)	Clippard (3)	Yankee Stadium	35,161	92–65	L1
158	September 28*	@ Yankees	3–5	Pazos (1–0)	**Kimbrel** (2–5)		Yankee Stadium	35,520	92–66	L2
159	September 29	@ Yankees	1–5	Sabathia (9–12)	**Owens** (0–2)		Yankee Stadium	41,597	92–67	L3
160	September 30	Blue Jays	5–3	**Ziegler** (4–6)	Biagini (4–3)	**Kimbrel** (31)	**Fenway Park**	37,661	93–67	W1
161	October 1	Blue Jays	3–4	Osuna (4–3)	**Kimbrel** (2–6)		**Fenway Park**	37,396	93–68	L1
162	October 2	Blue Jays	1–2	Sanchez (15–2)	**Ziegler** (2–4)	Osuna (36)	**Fenway Park**	36,787	93–69	L2
* Despite losing to New York on September 28, the Red Sox clinched the American League East title on this day by virtue of a Toronto loss.

=== Postseason game log ===
Boston Red Sox 2016 Postseason Game Log
American League Division Series vs. Cleveland Indians (0–3)

#	Date	Opponent	Score	Win	Loss	Save	Stadium	Attendance	Series	Box/ Streak
1	October 6	@ Indians	4–5	Miller (1–0)	**Porcello** (0–1)	Allen (1)	Progressive Field	37,763	0–1	L1
2	October 7	@ Indians	0–6	Kluber (1–0)	**Price** (0–1)		Progressive Field	37,842	0–2	L2
—	October 9	Indians	Postponed (rain). Makeup date: October 10.							
3	October 10	Indians	3–4	Tomlin (1–0)	**Buchholz** (0–1)	Allen (2)	**Fenway Park**	39,530	0–3	L3
**Red Sox lose series 0–3**

=== Detailed records ===
**American League**
Opponent	Home	Away	Total	Pct.	Runs scored	Runs allowed
**AL East**
Baltimore Orioles	3–6	8–2	11–8	.579	102	82
**Boston Red Sox**	—	—	—	—	—	—
New York Yankees	8–2	3–6	11–8	.579	84	77
Tampa Bay Rays	6–3	6–4	12–7	.632	87	73
Toronto Blue Jays	4–6	5–4	9–10	.474	97	85
	**21–17**	**22–16**	**43–33**	**.566**	**370**	**317**
**AL Central**
Chicago White Sox	1–3	2–1	3–4	.429	29	30
Cleveland Indians	2–1	2–1	4–2	.667	31	18
Detroit Tigers	0–3	2–2	2–5	.286	34	35
Kansas City Royals	1–2	1–2	2–4	.333	26	32
Minnesota Twins	2–2	2–1	4–3	.571	58	34
	**6–11**	**9–7**	**15–18**	**.455**	**178**	**149**
**AL West**
Houston Astros	3–1	2–1	5–2	.714	49	37
Los Angeles Angels	2–1	2–2	4–3	.571	31	42
Oakland Athletics	3–0	2–1	5–1	.833	67	20
Seattle Mariners	2–1	2–2	4–3	.571	22	22
Texas Rangers	2–1	1–2	3–3	.500	38	41
	**12–4**	**9–8**	**21–12**	**.636**	**207**	**162**

**National League**
Opponent	Home	Away	Total	Pct.	Runs scored	Runs allowed
**NL West**
Atlanta Braves	1–1	2–0	3–1	.750	24	13
Arizona Diamondbacks	3–0	–	3–0	1.000	31	9
Los Angeles Dodgers	–	1–2	1–2	.333	14	11
San Francisco Giants	2–0	1–1	3–1	.750	21	12
San Diego Padres	–	2–1	2–1	.667	13	5
Colorado Rockies	2–1	–	2–1	.667	20	14
	**8–2**	**6–4**	**14–6**	**.700**	**123**	**64**

== Statistics ==
As a team, the Red Sox led Major League Baseball in a number of offensive categories, including at bats (5670), runs scored (878), hits (1598), doubles (343), runs batted in (836), batting average (.282), on-base percentage (.348), slugging percentage (.461), on-base plus slugging (.810), total bases (2615) and extra-base hits (576).

Please note only the statistics from playing with the Red Sox are included in this list.

=== Regular season batting ===
Note: G = Games played; AB = At bats; R = Runs scored; H = Hits; 2B = Doubles; 3B = Triples; HR = Home runs; RBI = Runs batted in; SB = Stolen bases; BB = Walks; AVG = Batting average; Ref. = Reference

Top ten batters shown

Player	G	AB	R	H	2B	3B	HR	RBI	SB	BB	AVG	Ref.
Andrew Benintendi	34	105	16	31	11	1	2	14	1	10	.295	
Mookie Betts	158	672	122	214	42	5	31	113	26	49	.318	
Xander Bogaerts	157	652	115	192	34	1	21	89	13	58	.294	
Jackie Bradley Jr.	156	558	94	149	30	7	26	87	9	63	.267	
Sandy León	78	252	36	78	17	2	7	35	0	23	.310	
David Ortiz	151	537	79	169	48	1	38	127	2	80	.315	
Dustin Pedroia	154	633	105	201	36	1	15	74	7	61	.318	
Hanley Ramírez	147	549	81	157	28	1	30	111	9	60	.286	
Travis Shaw	145	480	63	116	34	2	16	71	5	43	.242	
Chris Young	76	203	29	56	18	0	9	24	4	21	.276	

Rest of the position players
Player	G	AB	R	H	2B	3B	HR	RBI	SB	BB	AVG	Ref.
Bryce Brentz	25	61	8	17	3	0	1	7	0	3	.279	
Clay Buchholz	1	2	0	0	0	0	0	0	0	1	.000	
Rusney Castillo	9	8	4	2	1	0	0	0	0	0	.250	
Ryan Hanigan	35	105	9	18	4	0	1	14	0	7	.171	
Marco Hernández	39	51	11	15	1	0	1	5	1	5	.294	
Aaron Hill	47	124	14	27	3	0	2	9	0	11	.218	
Bryan Holaday	14	33	3	7	1	0	0	1	0	2	.212	
Brock Holt	94	290	45	74	16	0	7	34	4	27	.255	
Ryan LaMarre	5	5	1	0	0	0	0	0	0	1	.000	
Deven Marrero	13	12	0	1	0	0	0	0	0	2	.083	
Michael Martínez	4	6	1	1	0	0	0	0	0	1	.167	
Mike Miller	1	1	0	0	0	0	0	0	0	0	.000	
Yoan Moncada	8	19	3	4	1	0	0	1	0	1	.211	
Drew Pomeranz	1	2	0	0	0	0	0	0	0	0	.000	
Rick Porcello	2	5	0	1	0	0	0	0	0	0	.200	
David Price	4	10	0	0	0	0	0	0	0	1	.000	
Eduardo Rodríguez	1	2	0	0	0	0	0	0	0	0	.000	
Josh Rutledge	28	49	9	13	6	0	0	3	2	6	.265	
Pablo Sandoval	3	6	0	0	0	0	0	0	0	1	.000	
Blake Swihart	19	62	9	16	0	3	0	5	0	11	.258	
Christian Vázquez	57	172	21	39	9	1	1	12	0	10	.227	
Steven Wright	2	4	0	0	0	0	0	0	0	0	.000	
Team totals	162	5670	878	1598	343	25	208	836	83	558	.282	

Top 10 hitters determined by fWAR:

=== Regular season pitching ===
Note: G = Games pitched; GS = Games started; W = Wins; L = Losses; SV = Saves; ERA = Earned run average; WHIP = Walks plus hits per inning pitched; IP = Innings pitched; H = Hits allowed; R = Runs allowed; ER = Earned runs allowed; BB = Walks allowed; K = Strikeouts; HLD = Holds; Ref. = Reference

Top ten pitchers shown

Player	G	GS	W	L	SV	ERA	WHIP	IP	H	R	ER	BB	K	HLD	Ref.
Clay Buchholz	37	21	8	10	0	4.78	1.33	139.1	130	80	74	55	93	2	
Craig Kimbrel	57	0	2	6	31	3.40	1.09	53.0	28	22	20	30	83	1	
Drew Pomeranz	14	13	3	5	0	4.59	1.37	68.2	70	35	35	24	71	0	
Rick Porcello	33	33	22	4	0	3.15	1.01	223.0	193	85	78	32	189	0	
David Price	35	35	17	9	0	3.99	1.20	230.0	227	106	102	50	228	0	
Eduardo Rodríguez	20	20	3	7	0	4.71	1.30	107.0	99	58	56	40	100	0	
Robbie Ross	54	0	3	2	0	3.25	1.25	55.1	46	21	20	23	56	8	
Koji Uehara	50	0	2	3	7	3.45	0.96	47.0	34	18	18	11	63	18	
Steven Wright	24	24	13	6	0	3.33	1.24	156.2	138	74	58	57	127	0	
Brad Ziegler	33	0	2	4	4	1.52	1.25	29.2	26	8	5	11	31	8	

Rest of the pitching staff
Player	G	GS	W	L	SV	ERA	WHIP	IP	H	R	ER	BB	K	HLD	Ref.
Fernando Abad	18	0	0	2	0	6.39	1.66	12.2	13	9	9	8	12	2	
Matt Barnes	62	0	4	3	1	4.05	1.40	66.2	62	32	30	31	71	16	
William Cuevas	3	0	0	1	0	3.60	2.20	5.0	5	2	2	6	3	0	
Roenis Elías	3	1	0	1	0	12.91	2.61	7.2	15	11	11	5	3	0	
Heath Hembree	38	0	4	1	0	2.65	1.33	51.0	51	23	15	17	47	6	
Joe Kelly	20	6	4	0	0	5.18	1.70	40.0	44	23	23	24	48	2	
Ryan LaMarre	1	0	0	0	0	0.00	2.00	1.0	2	0	0	0	0	0	
Tommy Layne	34	0	0	1	0	3.77	1.43	28.2	27	12	12	14	25	2	
Pat Light	2	0	0	0	0	23.63	3.00	2.2	7	8	7	1	2	0	
Sean O'Sullivan	5	4	2	0	0	6.75	1.69	21.1	30	17	16	6	13	0	
Henry Owens	5	5	0	2	0	6.95	1.95	22.0	23	17	17	20	21	0	
Noé Ramirez	14	0	0	0	0	6.23	1.85	13.0	16	9	9	8	15	0	
Robby Scott	7	0	1	0	0	0.00	1.33	6.0	6	0	0	2	5	1	
Carson Smith	3	0	0	0	0	0.00	1.13	2.2	2	1	0	1	2	0	
Junichi Tazawa	53	0	3	2	0	4.17	1.23	49.2	47	23	23	14	54	16	
Team totals	162	162	93	69	43	4.00	1.27	1439.2	1342	694	640	490	1362	82	

Top 10 pitchers determined by fWAR:

=== Postseason batting ===
Player	G	AB	R	H	2B	3B	HR	RBI	SB	BB	AVG	Ref.
Andrew Benintendi	3	9	1	3	1	0	1	2	0	0	.333	
Mookie Betts	3	10	1	2	1	0	0	0	0	2	.200	
Xander Bogaerts	3	12	1	3	0	0	0	0	0	0	.250	
Jackie Bradley Jr.	3	10	0	1	0	0	0	0	0	0	.100	
Marco Hernández	1	0	0	0	0	0	0	0	0	0	.000	
Aaron Hill	1	1	0	0	0	0	0	0	0	0	.000	
Brock Holt	3	10	1	4	1	0	1	1	0	0	.400	
Sandy León	3	10	1	1	0	0	1	1	0	1	.100	
David Ortiz	3	9	0	1	1	0	0	1	0	2	.111	
Dustin Pedroia	3	12	2	2	1	0	0	0	0	2	.167	
Hanley Ramírez	3	12	0	3	2	0	0	2	0	0	.250	
Travis Shaw	1	2	0	1	0	0	0	0	0	0	.500	
Chris Young	1	1	0	0	0	0	0	0	0	1	.000	

=== Postseason pitching ===
Player	G	GS	W	L	SV	ERA	WHIP	IP	H	R	ER	BB	K	Ref.
Matt Barnes	1	0	0	0	0	0.00	1.80	1.2	3	1	0	0	1	
Clay Buchholz	1	1	0	1	0	4.50	1.75	4.0	6	2	2	1	4	
Joe Kelly	3	0	0	0	0	0.00	0.00	3.2	0	0	0	0	3	
Craig Kimbrel	2	0	0	0	0	0.00	0.00	1.1	0	0	0	0	3	
Drew Pomeranz	2	0	0	0	0	4.91	1.64	3.2	4	2	2	2	7	
Rick Porcello	1	1	0	1	0	10.38	1.38	4.1	6	5	5	0	6	
David Price	1	1	0	1	0	13.50	2.40	3.1	6	5	5	2	3	
Robbie Ross	1	0	0	0	0	0.00	0.00	0.1	0	0	0	0	1	
Koji Uehara	2	0	0	0	0	0.00	0.50	2.0	1	0	0	0	1	
Brad Ziegler	1	0	0	0	0	0.00	1.50	0.2	0	0	0	1	1	

== Awards and honors ==
Recipient	Award	Date awarded	Ref.
Jackie Bradley Jr.	AL Player of the Week (May 9–15)	May 16, 2016	
Jackie Bradley Jr.	AL Player of the Month (May)	June 2, 2016	
Mookie Betts	All-Star Starter OF	July 5, 2016	
Xander Bogaerts	All-Star Starter SS	July 5, 2016	
Jackie Bradley Jr.	All-Star Starter OF	July 5, 2016	
Craig Kimbrel	All-Star Manager's Pick	July 5, 2016	
David Ortiz	All-Star Starter DH	July 5, 2016	
Steven Wright	All-Star Player's Selection	July 5, 2016	
Hanley Ramírez	AL Player of the Week (July 18–24)	July 25, 2016	
Mookie Betts	AL Player of the Month (July)	August 3, 2016	
Hanley Ramírez	AL Player of the Week (September 12–18)	September 19, 2016	
Rick Porcello	AL Pitcher of the Month (September)	October 3, 2016	
David Ortiz	AL Hank Aaron Award	October 26, 2016	
Mookie Betts	AL Gold Glove RF	November 8, 2016	
Mookie Betts	AL Silver Slugger OF	November 10, 2016	
Xander Bogaerts	AL Silver Slugger SS	November 10, 2016	
David Ortiz	AL Silver Slugger DH	November 10, 2016	
Rick Porcello	AL Cy Young Award	November 16, 2016	

== Farm system ==
Level	Team	League	Manager
AAA	Pawtucket Red Sox	International League	Kevin Boles
AA	Portland Sea Dogs	Eastern League	Carlos Febles
A-Advanced	Salem Red Sox	Carolina League	Joe Oliver
A	Greenville Drive	South Atlantic League	Darren Fenster
A-Short Season	Lowell Spinners	New York–Penn League	Iggy Suarez
Rookie	GCL Red Sox	Gulf Coast League	Tom Kotchman
Rookie	DSL Red Sox 1	Dominican Summer League	José Zapata
Rookie	DSL Red Sox 2	Dominican Summer League	Aly González

LEAGUE CHAMPIONS: DSL Red Sox 1
