= Marco Hernandez =

Marco Hernandez may refer to:

- Marco A. Hernandez (born 1957), American attorney and judge in the state of Oregon
- Marco Hernández (born 1992), Dominican Republic baseball player
