= Fernando Abad =

Dominican baseball player (born 1985)

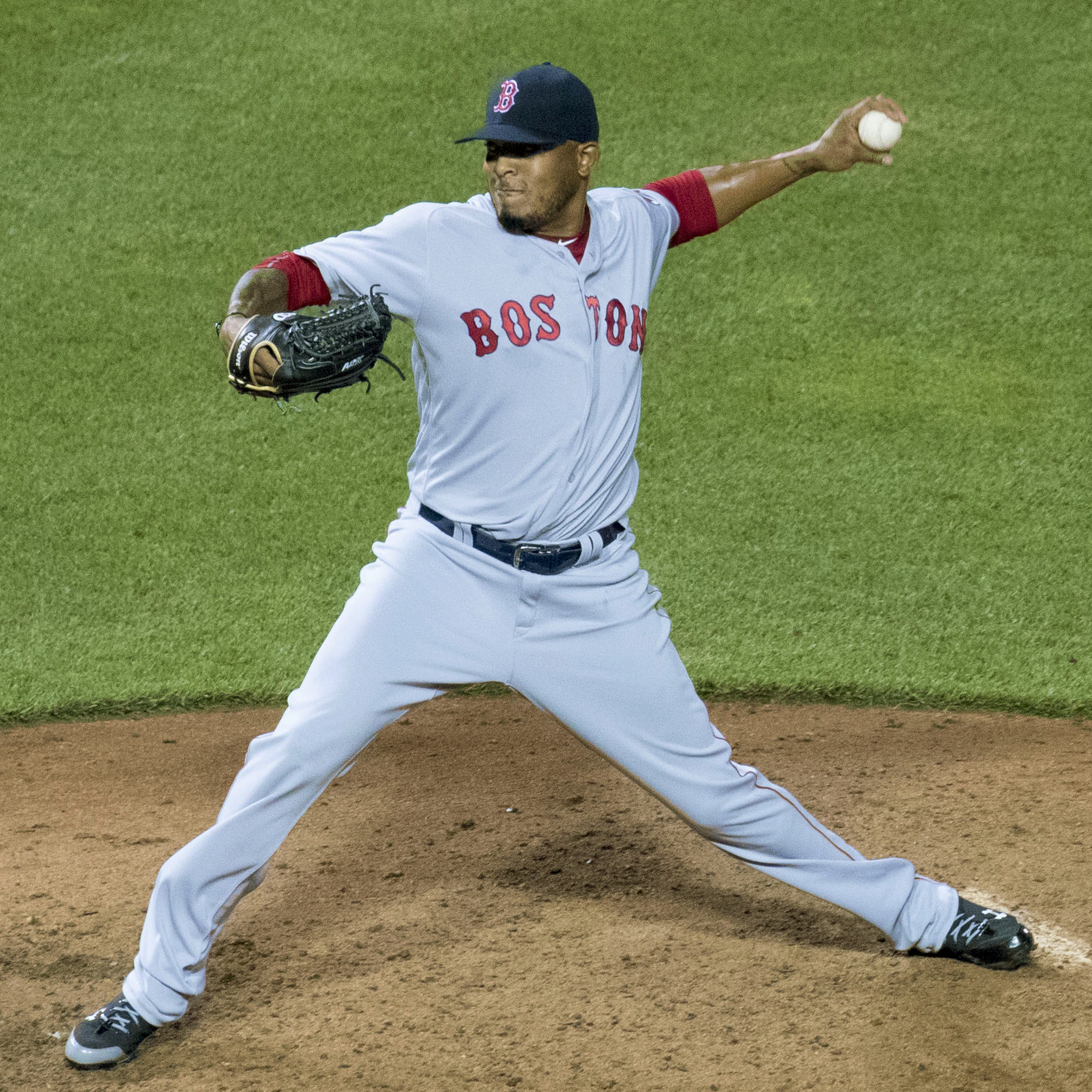
- Abad pitching for the Boston Red Sox in 2016

Free agent
- Pitcher
- Born: December 17, 1985 (age 40); La Romana, Dominican Republic
- Bats: Left Throws: Left

MLB debut
- July 28, 2010, for the Houston Astros

MLB statistics (through 2023 season)
- Win–loss record: 9–29
- Earned run average: 3.78
- Strikeouts: 292
- Stats at Baseball Reference

Teams
- Houston Astros (2010–2012); Washington Nationals (2013); Oakland Athletics (2014–2015); Minnesota Twins (2016); Boston Red Sox (2016–2017); San Francisco Giants (2019); Baltimore Orioles (2021); Colorado Rockies (2023)

Fernando Antonio Abad (/ˈeɪbæd/; born December 17, 1985) is a Dominican professional baseball pitcher who is a free agent. He has previously played in Major League Baseball (MLB) for the Houston Astros, Washington Nationals, Oakland Athletics, Minnesota Twins, Boston Red Sox, San Francisco Giants, Baltimore Orioles, and Colorado Rockies.

== Professional career ==
=== Houston Astros ===
Abad began his professional career in 2006, pitching for the Dominican Summer Astros. That year, he went 5–2 with a 1.32 ERA in 15 games (11 games started). He also struck out 64 batters in 61 1/3 innings.

He split 2007 between the Greeneville Astros (17 games, four starts) and Tri-City ValleyCats (two games), going a combined 6–4 with a 4.25 ERA, with 59 strikeouts in 53 innings. In 2008, he pitched for the Lexington Legends, going 2–7 with a 3.30 ERA in 45 relief appearances, striking out 94 batters in 76 1/3 innings.

Abad pitched for the Lancaster JetHawks (41 games) and Corpus Christi Hooks (three games, all starts) in 2009, going a combined 4–7 with a 4.00 ERA, striking out 92 batters in 96 2/3 innings of work.

In 3 seasons with the Astros, Abad went 1–11 with a 5.10 ERA in 88 games while striking out 65 in 84 2/3 innings. On November 1, 2012, Abad was removed from the 40-man roster and sent outright to the Triple-A Oklahoma City RedHawks.

=== Washington Nationals ===
On November 22, 2012, Abad signed a minor league contract with the Washington Nationals. He was called up to the big leagues when Ryan Mattheus was placed on the disabled list and he posted a 3.35 ERA in 37 2/3 innings out of the bullpen. On November 20, 2013, Abad was designated for assignment.

=== Oakland Athletics ===
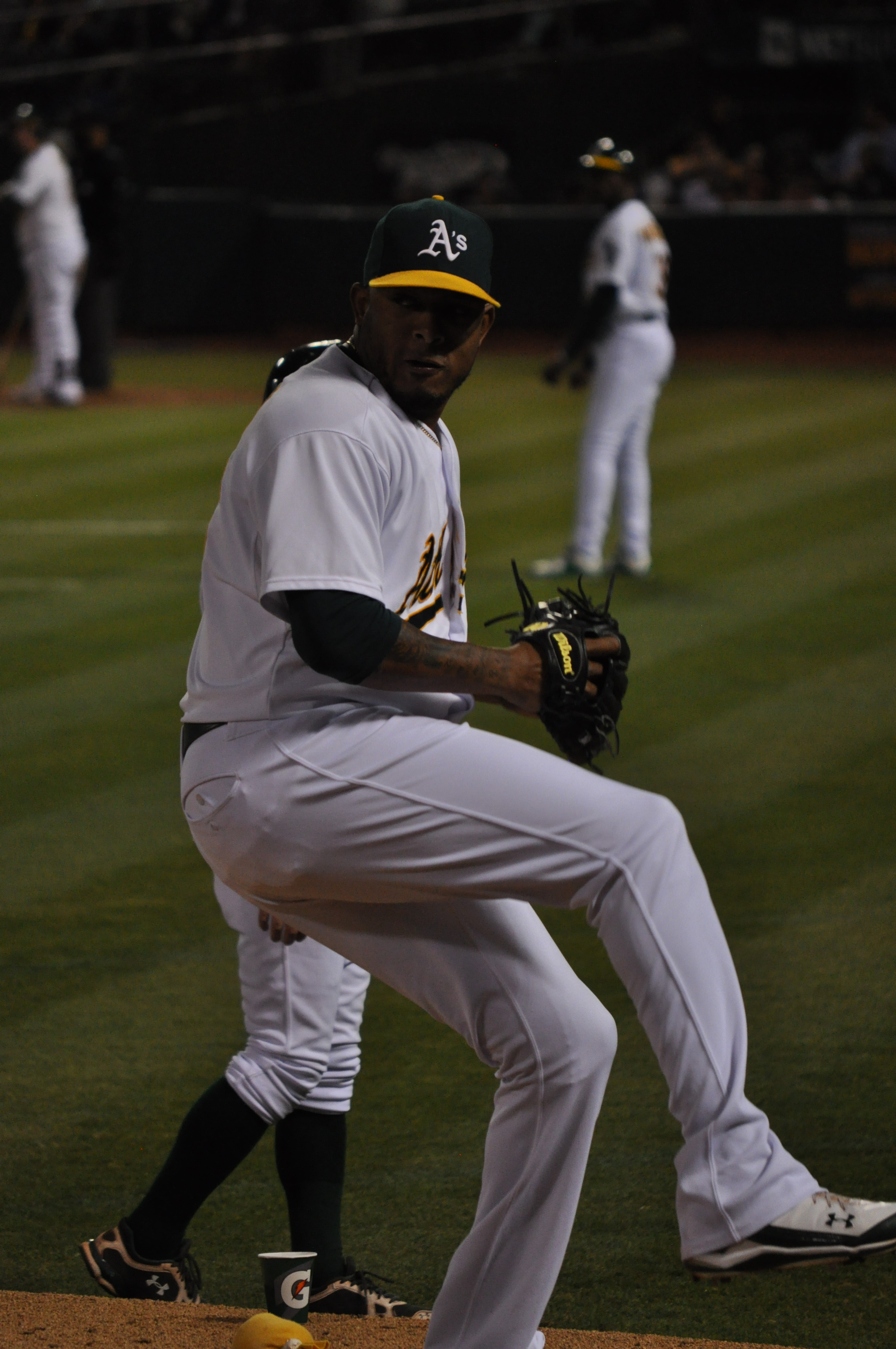
Abad warms up in 2015.

On November 25, 2013, the Nationals traded Abad to the Oakland Athletics for minor league outfielder John Wooten.

In his first season in Oakland, Abad pitched a career high 69 games with a career low 1.57 ERA in 57 1/3 innings. Abad regressed the following season, allowing 11 home runs in under 60 innings. The Athletics designated Abad for assignment after the 2015 season, and he later elected free agency.

=== Minnesota Twins ===
On December 17, 2015, Abad signed a minor league contract with the Minnesota Twins organization. On April 2, 2016, the Twins selected Abad's contract after he made the team's Opening Day roster. He became an integral part of the Twins' bullpen in 2016, posting a 1–4 record and 2.65 ERA with 29 strikeouts across 39 appearances.

=== Boston Red Sox ===
On August 1, 2016, the Twins traded Abad to the Boston Red Sox in exchange for Pat Light. In 2017, Abad appeared in 48 games for the Red Sox, pitching to a 3.30 ERA with 37 strikeouts in 43 2/3 innings of work. On November 2, 2017, Abad elected free agency.

=== Long Island Ducks ===
On February 17, 2018, Abad agreed to a minor league contract with the Philadelphia Phillies that included an invitation to spring training. He was released prior to the start of the season on March 21.

Abad signed a minor league contract with the New York Mets on March 25, 2018. On June 7, Abad was suspended 80 games after testing positive for Stanozolol, a performance-enhancing substance and was released by the Mets upon the announcement of the news.

On August 3, 2018, Abad signed with the Long Island Ducks of the Atlantic League of Professional Baseball. In 19 games for the Ducks, he logged a 1-0 record and 0.48 ERA with 23 strikeouts and 2 saves across 18 2/3 innings pitched. Abad became a free agent following the 2018 season.

=== San Francisco Giants ===
On February 16, 2019, Abad signed a minor league contract with the San Francisco Giants organization. In 41 appearances split between the Double–A Richmond Flying Squirrels and Triple–A Sacramento River Cats, he compiled a 2.70 ERA with 55 strikeouts and 13 saves over 50 innings pitched. On August 15, the Giants selected Abad's contract, adding him to their active roster. In 21 games for San Francisco, he logged a 4.15 ERA with 9 strikeouts across 13 innings of work. On November 2, the Giants declined their option on Abad for the 2020 season, making him a free agent.

=== New York Yankees ===
On December 18, 2019, Abad returned to the Washington Nationals, signing a minor league contract with the organization. He was released by the Nationals on July 17, 2020.

On July 24, 2020, Abad signed a minor league contract with the New York Yankees organization. He became a free agent on November 2.

=== Baltimore Orioles ===
On December 16, 2020, Abad signed a minor league contract with the Baltimore Orioles organization. After the 2020 season, he played for Toros del Este of the Dominican Professional Baseball League (LIDOM). He has also played for Dominican Republic in the 2021 Caribbean Series. After posting a 4.26 ERA with 27 strikeouts in 26 appearances for the Triple-A Norfolk Tides, the Orioles selected Abad's contract on August 15, 2021.

=== Saraperos de Saltillo ===
On March 23, 2022, Abad signed with the Saraperos de Saltillo of the Mexican League. In 4 games for Saltillo, he registered a 2-0 record and 2.25 ERA with 7 strikeouts over 4 innings of relief.

=== Seattle Mariners ===
On May 4, 2022, Abad signed a minor league deal with the Seattle Mariners. He was assigned to the Triple-A Tacoma Rainiers, with whom he recorded a 3.56 ERA in 40 appearances, striking out 32 batters in 43 innings pitched. He elected free agency following the season on November 10.

=== Colorado Rockies ===
On January 9, 2023, Abad signed a minor league contract with the Colorado Rockies organization. He was assigned to the Triple-A Albuquerque Isotopes to begin the year, where he pitched to a 1.69 ERA with 20 strikeouts and 2 saves across 13 appearances. On May 15, Abad's contract was selected to the active roster. He pitched in 3 games for Colorado, surrendering 3 runs on 6 hits and 2 walks in 2 2/3 innings of work. On May 21, Abad was designated for assignment following the promotion of Matt Carasiti. He was released by the Rockies on May 24. Abad re-signed with the Rockies organization on a minor league contract on May 30. On July 2, Abad was selected back to the major league roster. He was the winning pitcher for the first time in 2,226 days in a 4–3 victory over the Astros at Coors Field on July 18. His previous win was with the Red Sox six years prior on June 13, 2017, when he defeated the Philadelphia Phillies.

Somewhat ironically, this long-awaited win turned out to be Abad's last major league appearance. After posting a 4.26 ERA across 6 appearances, Abad was designated for assignment on July 19, after Brent Suter was activated from the injured list. On July 22, he again cleared waivers and was outrighted to Albuquerque. Abad was released by the Rockies organization on August 15.

=== Milwaukee Brewers ===
On August 25, 2023, Abad signed a minor league contract with the Milwaukee Brewers organization. In 9 appearances for the Triple–A Nashville Sounds, he posted a 7.88 ERA with 8 strikeouts and 2 saves across 8 innings pitched. Abad elected free agency following the season on November 6.

=== Saraperos de Saltillo (second stint) ===
On February 24, 2024, Abad signed with the Saraperos de Saltillo of the Mexican League. In 42 appearances for Saltillo, he logged a 2–1 record and 4.65 ERA with 31 strikeouts and 3 saves over 40 2/3 innings of relief. Abad was released by the Saraperos on March 19, 2025.

=== Algodoneros de Unión Laguna ===
On April 8, 2025, Abad signed with the Algodoneros de Unión Laguna of the Mexican League. He made 41 appearances for the Algodoneros, compiling a 3-2 record and 4.31 ERA with 38 strikeouts across 39 2/3 innings pitched.

Abad made 13 appearances for the club in 2026, posting a 1–1 record with a 5.40 ERA, six strikeouts, and three walks in 11 2/3 innings pitched. On June 29, 2026, Abad was released by Laguna.

=== Conspiradores de Querétaro ===
On July 8, 2026, Abad signed with the Conspiradores de Querétaro of the Mexican League. In 9 games of relief with Querétaro he threw 10 innings going 0-1 with a 5.40 ERA with 10 strikeouts. He was released on November 10.

== Pitching style ==
Abad features a four-seam fastball (94–97 mph), a sinker (92–95 mph), a curveball (78–83 mph), and a changeup (75–79 mph). He tends to use the sinker and changeup more against right-handed hitters, and his four-seamer and curveball more against left-handed hitters. He also occasionally throws an eephus pitch, around 55 mph.
