= Pat Light =

American baseball player (born 1991)

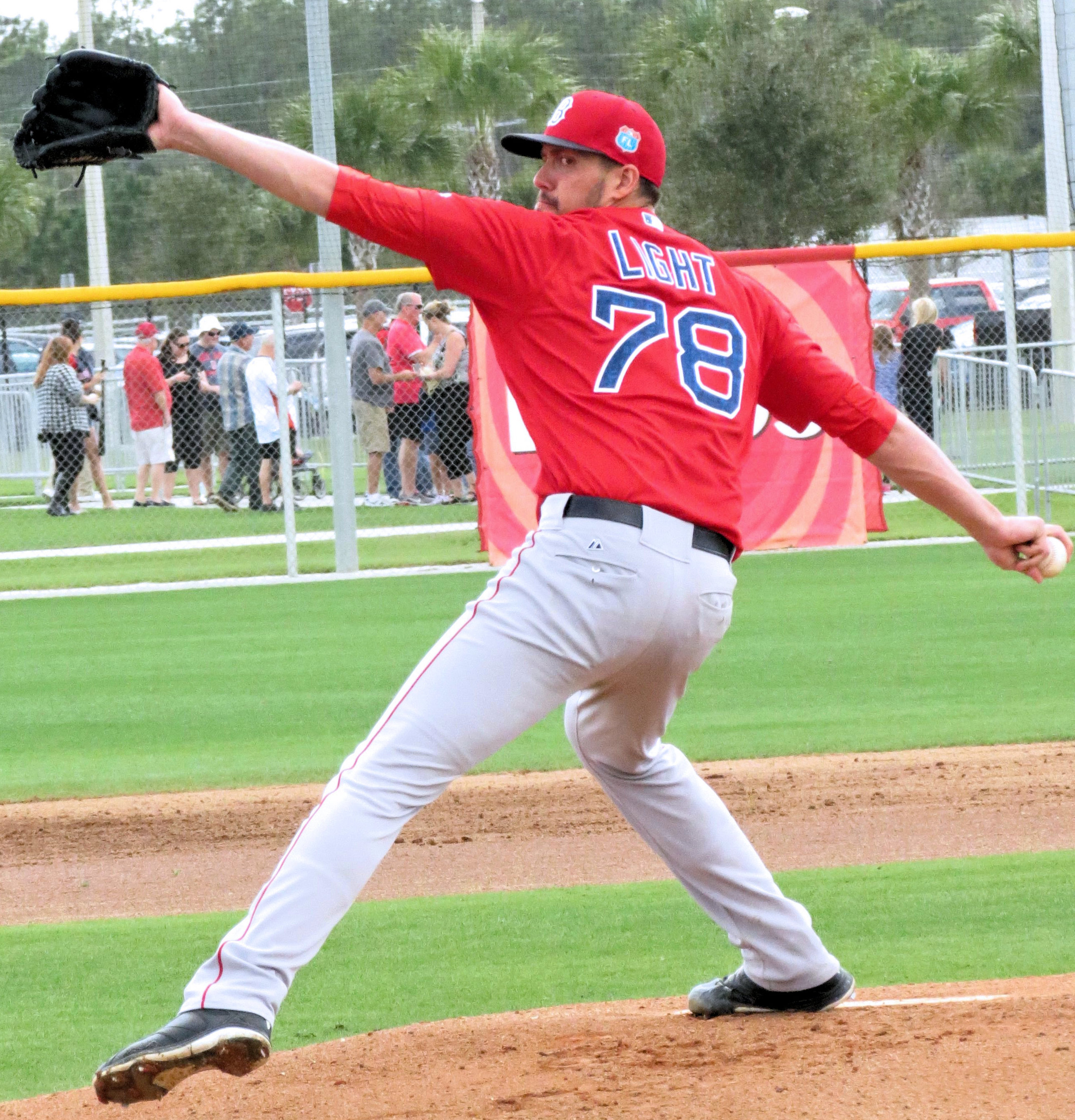
- Light pitching for the Boston Red Sox in 2016
- Relief pitcher
- Born: March 29, 1991 (age 34); Colts Neck Township, New Jersey, U.S.
- Batted: Right Threw: Right

MLB debut
- April 26, 2016, for the Boston Red Sox

Last MLB appearance
- September 30, 2016, for the Minnesota Twins

MLB statistics
- Win–loss record: 0–1
- Earned run average: 11.34
- Strikeouts: 16
- Stats at Baseball Reference

Teams
- Boston Red Sox (2016); Minnesota Twins (2016)

Patrick James Light (born March 29, 1991) is an American former professional baseball pitcher. He played in Major League Baseball (MLB) for the Boston Red Sox and Minnesota Twins.

== Amateur career ==
Pat Light attended Christian Brothers Academy (CBA) in Lincroft, New Jersey, where he became one of the most dominant high school pitchers in the state. Over the course of his career at CBA, Light posted a perfect 20–0 record with a 1.52 earned run average (ERA), the best career mark in Shore Conference history.

As a senior in 2009, Light led CBA to the NJSIAA Non-Public A state championship, throwing a complete-game 4–1 victory in the title game against Don Bosco Preparatory High School. He also helped CBA win two Class A North division titles during his time there. Light earned two First Team All-Shore selections and was named Third Team All-State by The Star-Ledger in his senior season.

The Minnesota Twins selected Light in the 28th round of the 2009 Major League Baseball draft, but he opted to attend Monmouth University, where he pitched from 2010 to 2012. He compiled a 14–14 record, 3.84 ERA, and 196 strikeouts across 39 appearances. He was ranked #53 on Baseball America’s preseason Top 100 list of 2012 draft prospects.

In summer 2010, Light was named an All-Star in the New England Collegiate Baseball League (NECBL) while pitching for the Newport Gulls. In 2011, he played for the Chatham Anglers of the Cape Cod Baseball League.

== Professional career ==
=== Boston Red Sox ===
The Boston Red Sox selected Light in the first round (37th overall) of the 2012 MLB draft. Light made his professional debut in 2012 with the Short-Season A Lowell Spinners, where he posted a 0–2 record with a 2.37 ERA in 12 starts, allowing eight runs (seven earned) on 27 hits and five walks, while striking out 30 in 30 1/3 innings of work. He then joined the Low A Greenville Drive in 2013, but suffered a partial tear in his right hamstring that was initially misdiagnosed before all-but-ending his season in early June. He returned in late August for a rehab assignment with the GCL Red Sox, where he pitched six innings of shutout ball in three appearances. Being limited to 28 1/3 innings at Greenville, he went 1–4 with 28 strikeouts and an ERA of 8.06.

Light returned to Greenville in 2014 and earned a promotion to the High-A Salem Red Sox during the midseason. He went 8–6 with a 4.83 ERA in 25 starts between Greenville and Salem, striking out 76 batters while walking 37 in 132 1/3 innings.

After making 49 starts over his first three seasons, Light was told he would be changing roles and throwing out of the bullpen when he reported to Double-A Portland Sea Dogs to open the 2015 season. With the Red Sox relief pitchers finishing last in fastball average velocity in 2014, and giving another hard-throwing prospect Matt Barnes a chance as a reliever, the organization decided to increase velocity out of the bullpen more than it had before.

Light delivered a solid start to his 2015 season after being moved to the bullpen. He regularly reached 94–96 mph with his heavy fastball, reportedly touched 100 mph at times, and reintroduced a splitter, which he had used successfully before being drafted in 2012. As a result, Light went 1–1 with a 2.43 ERA and three saves in 21 games at Double-A Portland, allowing 11 walks and striking out 32 in 29 2/3 innings, while holding opponents to a .168 batting average. He then earned a promotion to the Triple-A Pawtucket Red Sox in the month of June. Light was 3–5 with five saves and a 3.88 ERA in the two stints, totaling 62 2/3 innings pitched to go with 67 strikeouts and 37 walks.

Light opened 2016 at Pawtucket. He was promoted to the Boston Red Sox on April 24. After giving up six runs, including two home runs, in a July 2 game against the Los Angeles Angels of Anaheim, he was demoted back to Pawtucket.

=== Minnesota Twins ===
On August 1, 2016, the Boston Red Sox traded Pat Light to the Minnesota Twins in exchange for veteran left-handed reliever Fernando Abad. Light made his debut with the Twins on August 7, 2016, pitching two innings against the Tampa Bay Rays and allowing two earned runs. He appeared in a total of 15 games for Minnesota during the 2016 season, posting a 5.94 ERA and 16 strikeouts across 16.2 innings.

Despite his high-velocity fastball, Light struggled with command and consistency during his stint in the majors. On February 6, 2017, he was designated for assignment by the Twins to make room on the 40-man roster for infielder Ehire Adrianza.

=== Pittsburgh Pirates ===
Three days later, on February 9, 2017, Light was traded to the Pittsburgh Pirates in exchange for cash considerations or a player to be named later. He was assigned to the Triple-A Indianapolis Indians, where he pitched in 18 games and recorded a 3.76 ERA with 20 strikeouts over 26.1 innings.

However, his control issues persisted, leading to his designation for assignment by the Pirates on June 10, 2017.

=== Seattle Mariners ===
On June 17, 2017, Light was claimed off waivers by the Seattle Mariners and assigned to the Triple-A Tacoma Rainiers. He appeared in 11 games for Tacoma, recording a 5.68 ERA. Despite flashes of potential, his struggles with command and effectiveness against left-handed hitters limited his progress.

Light was released by the Mariners organization on April 19, 2018, effectively ending his affiliated professional baseball career.

== Player profile ==
Pat Light was known for his power arm and imposing presence on the mound, standing 6 feet 5 inches tall and weighing 220 pounds. His primary weapon was a heavy four-seam fastball that consistently ranged from 99–104 mph (159–167 km/h), and at times touched as high as 108 mph (174 km/h) on radar guns during workouts and professional scouting showcases.

His fastball featured good riding action and late life, making it difficult for batters to square up. Complementing his fastball, Light had a developing slider in the high 80s and a split-finger fastball that served as his main off-speed pitch. Scouts noted the split-finger as an emerging out pitch, particularly effective against left-handed hitters.

Though initially used as a starter at Monmouth, Light was widely projected to transition to a bullpen role in professional baseball. Analysts believed his high-velocity arsenal, paired with occasional command issues and effort in his delivery, made him an ideal candidate for a late-inning reliever role—either as a setup man or potential closer.

His ability to generate strikeouts in short bursts and intimidate hitters with raw velocity earned him comparisons to hard-throwing relievers like Craig Kimbrel and Trevor Rosenthal in his minor league evaluations.
