= Marco Hernández =

Dominican baseball player (born 1992)

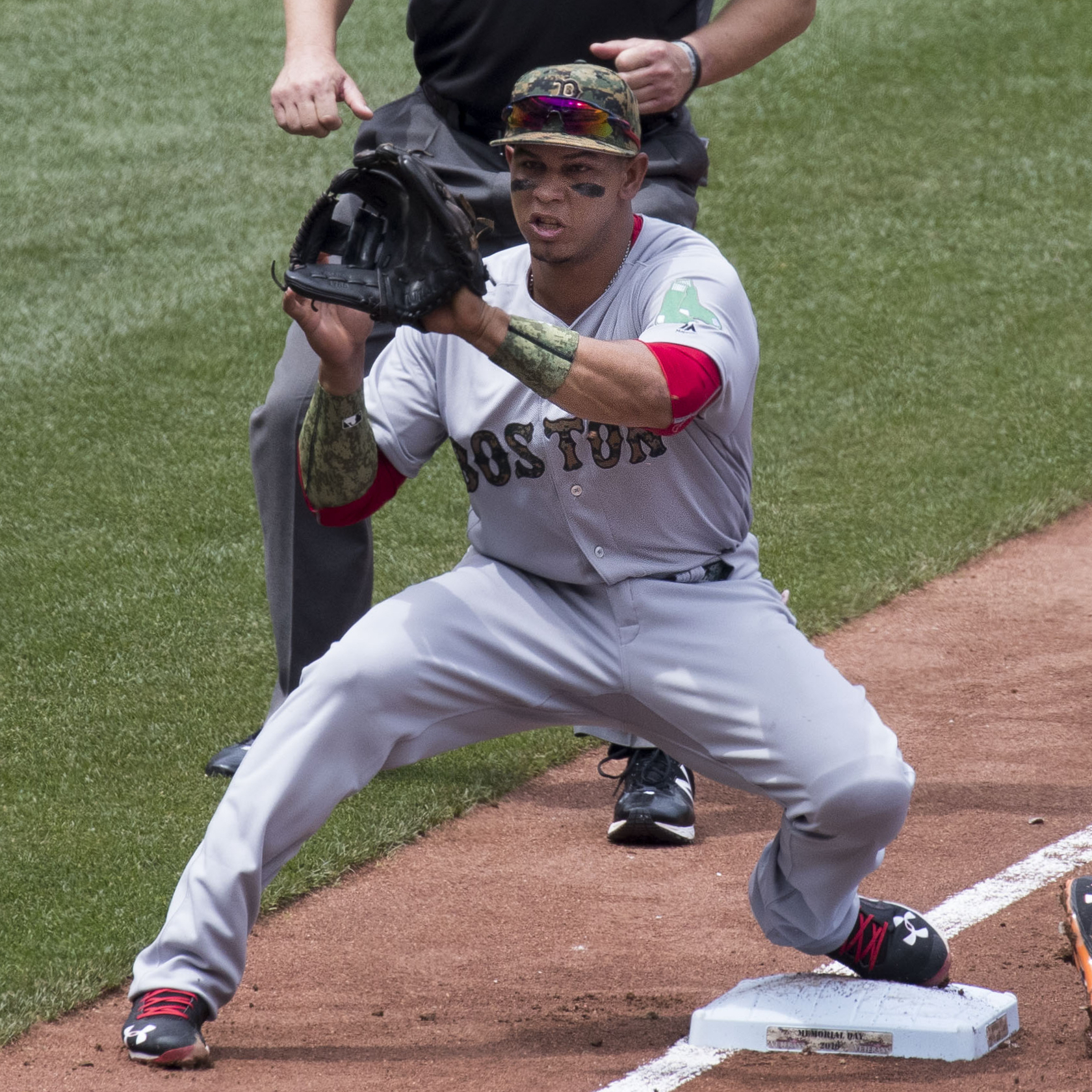
- Hernández with the Boston Red Sox

Leones del Escogido
- Infielder
- Born: September 6, 1992 (age 34); Santiago, Dominican Republic
- Bats: Left Throws: Right

MLB debut
- April 17, 2016, for the Boston Red Sox

MLB statistics (through 2019 season)
- Batting average: .265
- Home runs: 3
- Runs batted in: 18
- Stats at Baseball Reference

Teams
- Boston Red Sox (2016–2017, 2019)

Marco Antonio Hernández (born September 6, 1992) is a Dominican professional baseball infielder for the Olmecas de Tabasco of the Mexican League. Listed at 6 feet 0 inches (1.83 m) and 200 pounds (91 kg), he bats left-handed and throws right-handed. He has previously played in Major League Baseball (MLB) for the Boston Red Sox.

== Career ==
=== Chicago Cubs ===
Hernández was originally signed by the Chicago Cubs as a non-drafted free agent in 2009. He played from 2010 through 2014 in the Cubs' farm system, where he was named to the Florida State League mid-season All-Star team in 2014, while leading the High-A Daytona Cubs with seven triples and 22 stolen bases, hitting .270 (119-for-441) with 13 doubles, three home runs, and 55 RBI in 122 games. Overall, he posted a slash line of .273/.315/.376 with 17 home runs and 202 RBI in 463 games for the organization. Hernández was originally a switch hitter, but since 2014 has only hit left-handed.

=== Boston Red Sox ===
Hernández was acquired by Boston as the player to be named later in the deal that sent Félix Doubront to the Cubs in August 2014.

Hernández opened 2015 with the Double-A Portland Sea Dogs, where he slashed .326/.349/.482 in his first 68 games for Portland, mostly as a leadoff hitter, to become one of five Sea Dogs chosen for the Eastern League All-Star team. He then made a huge impact on the All-Star Game at Hadlock Field, going 2-for-2 with two runs, a single and a two-run home run, which earned him MVP honors. Hernández came into the game as the league's leading hitter with a .326 average. As a result, he earned a promotion to the Triple-A Pawtucket Red Sox. He hit .271 with four home runs and 22 RBI in 46 games for Pawtucket, ending the season with an accumulative .305/.330/.454 slash line along with nine homers and 53 RBI in the two stints.

Hernández was added to the Red Sox' 40-man roster in November 2015, and made a strong impression at 2016 spring training at JetBlue Park. He started the regular season at Pawtucket, then gained a promotion to Boston on April 15. Hernández made his MLB debut on April 17, 2016, collecting a hit and a walk with one run scored. He split time between Pawtucket and Boston during the season, and hit his first MLB home run on Memorial Day, May 30, against the Baltimore Orioles. Overall, Hernández appeared in 40 games with the 2016 Red Sox, batting .294 with one home run and five RBI.

In 2017, Hernández sustained a left shoulder subluxation in a game in early May, and was added to the disabled list. In late May, he underwent season-ending surgery on his left shoulder. For the season, he appeared in 21 games with the 2017 Red Sox, batting .276 with no home runs and two RBI.

Hernández left spring training in late February 2018, due to additional difficulty with his left shoulder. He was placed on the 60-day disabled list on March 29. He underwent surgery on his left shoulder on July 10, ending his season. He missed the entire 2018 season as a result.

In 2019, the team placed Hernández on the 10-day injured list prior to Opening Day. On April 20, he was sent on a rehab assignment with the High-A Salem Red Sox, and on April 25 was optioned to Salem. On May 18, Hernández was assigned to Triple-A Pawtucket. Hernández was added to Boston's major league roster on June 8, when Mitch Moreland was placed on the injured list, and was optioned to Pawtucket on July 23, when Moreland returned. Hernández was recalled to Boston on August 2, returned to Pawtucket two days later, and again recalled to Boston on August 12. Overall with the 2019 Red Sox, Hernández appeared in 61 games, batting .250 with two home runs and 11 RBI. After the season, Hernández played winter baseball in the Dominican Professional Baseball League. Hernández was non-tendered on December 2, 2019, and became a free agent.

On December 4, 2019, Hernández re-signed with Boston on a one-year major league contract. On January 10, 2020, Hernández was designated for assignment by the Red Sox; he was sent outright to Triple-A Pawtucket six days later. He did not play in a game in 2020 due to the cancellation of the minor league season because of the COVID-19 pandemic. Hernández was released by the Red Sox organization on August 30.

=== Chicago White Sox ===
On January 6, 2021, it was announced that Hernández had been signed to a minor league contract by the Chicago White Sox and was invited to spring training. He was assigned to the Triple-A Charlotte Knights. In 97 appearances for Charlotte, Hernández batted .267/.286/.377 with five home runs and 34 RBI. He elected free agency following the season on November 7.

=== Guerreros de Oaxaca ===
On April 14, 2025, after three years of inactivity, Hernández signed with the Guerreros de Oaxaca of the Mexican League. In 17 appearances for Oaxaca, Hernández batted .238/.273/.405 with two home runs and six RBI.

=== Olmecas de Tabasco ===
On May 21, 2025, Hernández was traded to the Olmecas de Tabasco in exchange for Abraham Almonte. In 41 games he hit .429/.472/.601 with 6 home runs, 26 RBIs and 6 stolen bases.
