= Mike Miller (baseball) =

American baseball player (born 1989)

- Infielder
- Born: September 27, 1989 (age 36); Concord, California, U.S.
- Batted: Right Threw: Right

MLB debut
- June 27, 2016, for the Boston Red Sox

Last MLB appearance
- June 27, 2016, for the Boston Red Sox

MLB statistics
- Batting average: .000
- Home runs: 0
- Runs batted in: 0
- Stats at Baseball Reference

Teams
- Boston Red Sox (2016)

Michael Ryan Miller (born September 27, 1989) is an American former professional baseball infielder. He played in one Major League Baseball (MLB) game for the Boston Red Sox in 2016. Listed at 5 feet 9 inches (1.75 m) and 170 pounds (77 kg), he bats and throws right-handed.

== Early years ==
Miller attended De La Salle High School in Concord, California, Cuesta College in San Luis Obispo, California, and California Polytechnic State University (Cal Poly) in San Luis Obispo.

For Cuesta, Miller hit .392 during the 2009 season. In 2012, he earned first-team All-Big West selection after pacing the Mustangs with a .354 batting average.

== Professional career ==
=== Boston Red Sox ===
Miller was selected by the Boston Red Sox in the ninth round of the 2012 MLB draft, with the 301st overall pick. From 2012 through 2015, Miller played for several Red Sox farm teams: the Low–A Lowell Spinners, the Single–A Greenville Drive, the High–A Salem Red Sox, the Double-A Portland Sea Dogs, and the Triple-A Pawtucket Red Sox.

Miller began the 2016 season with Double-A Portland, and was subsequently promoted to Triple-A Pawtucket. On June 27, Miller was added to Boston's major league roster. Miller made his MLB debut in that day's game against the Tampa Bay Rays, entering as a defensive replacement at second base in the eighth inning, and grounding out in an at bat in the ninth inning. On July 2, Miller was sent outright back to Pawtucket, removing him from the 40-man roster. Miller finished the season in Triple-A, appearing in 90 games while batting .228.

In 2017, Miller appeared in 85 games for Pawtucket, batting .261. He also made four appearances as a relief pitcher, registering a 12.71 ERA in 5 2/3 innings pitched. In 2018, he batted .284 with four home runs and 31 RBI in 102 games with Pawtucket. He became a free agent after the 2018 season, then re-signed with the Red Sox organization on February 24, 2019.

Miller began the 2019 season with Pawtucket, and was granted his release on August 3, 2019.

=== Minnesota Twins ===
On August 5, 2019, Miller signed a minor league contract with the Minnesota Twins organization. In 25 games for the Triple–A Rochester Red Wings, he batted .238/.297/.274 with six RBI and one stolen base. Miller elected free agency following the season on November 4.
