= 2016 Baltimore Orioles season =

Major League Baseball season

2016 Baltimore Orioles
- American League Wild Card winners
- League: American League
- Division: East
- Ballpark: Oriole Park at Camden Yards
- City: Baltimore, Maryland
- Record: 89–73 (.549)
- Divisional place: 3rd
- Owners: Peter Angelos
- General managers: Dan Duquette
- Managers: Buck Showalter
- Television: MASN; WJZ-TV (CBS 13) (Gary Thorne, Jim Palmer, Mike Bordick, Jim Hunter)
- Radio: WJZ-FM; Baltimore Orioles Radio Network (Joe Angel, Jim Hunter, Fred Manfra, Ben McDonald, Mike Bordick)

The 2016 Baltimore Orioles season was the 116th season in franchise history, the 63rd in Baltimore, and the 25th at Oriole Park at Camden Yards. They improved on their 2015 record of 81–81, finishing 89–73. and advanced to the playoffs on the last day of the season, October 2, where they lost to the Blue Jays in the American League Wild Card Game 5–2 in 11 innings; this was the Orioles' third postseason appearance in five years.

Right fielder Mark Trumbo won the MLB and American League home run championships with 47; 2016 was the fourth consecutive year in which an Oriole won the home run crown following Chris Davis in 2013, Nelson Cruz in 2014 and Davis again in 2015. Closer Zach Britton recorded a perfect 47 saves in 47 opportunities; Britton set an all-time record of 43 consecutive appearances without allowing an earned run. Britton's 0.54 ERA was the lowest ever recorded by a pitcher with at least 50 innings pitched. This season was their last winning season until 2022, and their last playoff appearance until 2023.

== Offseason ==
- Oct 20: Claimed RHP Vance Worley off waivers from Pittsburgh Pirates.
- Nov 2: C Matt Wieters, 1B Chris Davis, OF Gerardo Parra, 1B Steve Pearce, LHP Wei-Yin Chen and RHP Darren O'Day elected free agency.
- Nov 2: RHP Dylan Bundy activated from 60-day disabled list.
- Nov 6: Selected contract of LHP Chris Jones from AAA Norfolk Tides.
- Nov 13: Re-signed free agent C Matt Wieters (accepted qualifying offer).
- Nov 20: Selected the contracts of RHP Parker Bridwell, RHP Andrew Triggs and LHP Chris Lee from AA Bowie Baysox.
- Nov 25: Acquired OF L. J. Hoes from Houston Astros for cash.
- Dec 2: Traded C Steve Clevenger to Seattle Mariners for OF/1B Mark Trumbo and LHP C. J. Riefenhauser.
- Dec 2: Acquired C Francisco Peña from Kansas City Royals for cash.
- Dec 2: RHP Steve Johnson and LF David Lough elected free agency.
- Dec 3: SS Paul Janish elected free agency.
- Dec 10: Drafted OF Joey Rickard from Tampa Bay Rays under Rule 5; designated OF Junior Lake for assignment.
- Dec 14: Re-signed free agent RHP Darren O'Day; designated 2B Rey Navarro for assignment.
- Dec 18: Toronto Blue Jays claimed RF Junior Lake off waivers.
- Dec 23: Los Angeles Angels claimed 2B Rey Navarro off waivers.
- Dec 23: Signed free agent OF Hyun-soo Kim.
- Jan 1: Signed SS Paul Janish to a minor-league contract.
- Jan 8: Claimed 1B Joey Terdoslavich off waivers from Atlanta Braves.
- Jan 16: Re-signed free agent 1B Chris Davis; 1B Joey Terdoslavich designated for assignment.
- Jan 26: Acquired OF/1B Efren Navarro from Los Angeles Angels for cash; designated OF L. J. Hoes for assignment.
- Jan 28: Outrightred OF Joey Terdoslavich to AAA Norfolk Tides.
- Feb 4: Outrighted OF L. J. Hoes to AAA Norfolk Tides.
- Feb 4: Acquired RHP Odrisamer Despaigne from San Diego Padres for RHP Jean Cosme; designated LHP C. J. Riefenhauser for assignment.
- Feb 25: Signed free agent RHP Yovani Gallardo; designated OF/1B Efren Navarro for assignment.

== Regular season ==
=== Transactions ===
==== Contracts ====
April 7: St. Louis Cardinals traded LHP Jayson Aquino to Baltimore Orioles for cash.
April 15: Claimed RHP Scott McGough off waivers from Miami Marlins.
April 18: Traded LF Alfredo Marte to Philadelphia Phillies for player TBD.
April 25: Claimed RHP David Hale off waivers from Colorado Rockies.

May 7: Contract of SS Paul Janish selected from AAA Norfolk.
May 9: RHP Scott McGough sent outright to AAA Norfolk.
May 16: Toronto Blue Jays claimed DH Jimmy Paredes off waivers from Baltimore Orioles.
May 23:Baltimore Orioles traded LHP Brian Matusz to Atlanta Braves for RHP Brandon Barker and LHP Trevor Belicek.
May 24: Cincinnati Reds traded RHP Franderlin Romero to Baltimore Orioles for Future Considerations; Contract of LHP Ashur Tolliver selected from AA Bowie.
May 25: Baltimore Orioles signed free agent LHP Brian Duensing to a minor league contract.

June 2: Contract of LHP Brian Duensing selected from AAA Norfolk; Baltimore Orioles signed free agents LHP Hector Jimenez and RHP Wally Vrolijk to a minor league contracts.
June 21: SS Paul Janish sent outright to AAA Norfolk.
June 30: Contract of RHP Chaz Roe selected from AAA Norfolk.
June 31: Contract of RHP Sidney Ponson selected from AAA Norfolk.

July 3: Contract of LHP Ariel Miranda selected from AAA Norfolk.
July 12: Contract of LHP Donnie Hart selected from AA Bowie.
July 19: Contract of OF Julio Borbón selected from AA Bowie.
July 28: OF Henry Urruita sent outright to AA Bowie.
July 29: OF Julio Bourbon sent outright to AA Bowie; signed free agent RHP Logan Ondrusek.
July 31: Baltimore Orioles traded LHP Ariel Miranda to Seattle Mariners for LHP Wade Miley.

August 1: Baltimore Orioles traded C Jonah Heim to Tampa Bay Rays for 2B Steve Pearce.
August 2: Baltimore Orioles activated Steve Pearce and LHP Wade Miley.
August 7: Atlanta Braves claim RHP Chaz Roe off waivers from Baltimore Orioles.
August 27: Contract of CF Julio Borbon selected from AA Bowie.
August 28: Baltimore Orioles signed free agent RHP Tommy Hunter.
August 30: CF Julio Borbon and RHP Logan Ondrusek sent outright to AA Bowie.
August 31: Pittsburgh Pirates traded LHP Kyle Lobstein to Baltimore Orioles for LHP Zach Phillips; Claimed CF Drew Stubbs off waivers from Texas Rangers.

September 3: LHP Kyle Lobstein sent outright to AAA Norfolk.
September 15: Miami Marlins claimed Odrisamer Despaigne off waivers from Baltimore Orioles; Contract of SS Paul Janish selected from AAA Norfolk.
September 18: Contract of 1B Trey Mancini selected from AAA Norfolk.

October 7: LHP Jed Bradley claimed off waivers from the Atlanta Braves.
October 13: SS Paul Janish sent outright to AAA Norfolk.

==== Callups & optional assignments ====
April 1: C Francisco Pena optioned to AAA Norfolk.
April 7: LHP Jayson Aquino optioned to AA Bowie.
April 15: RHP Scott McGough optioned to AAA Norfolk.
April 25: RHP David Hale and IF Ryan Flaherty optioned to AAA Norfolk.

May 3: IF Ryan Flaherty recalled from AAA Norfolk.
May 7: RHP Scott McGough designated for assignment; LHP T.J. McFarland optioned to AAA Norfolk; LHP T.J. McFarland recalled from AAA Norfolk.
May 8: LHP T.J. McFarland optioned to AAA Norfolk.
May 31: C Francisco Pena recalled from AAA Norfolk.

June 1: LHP T.J. McFarland recalled from AAA Norfolk; LHP Ashur Tolliver optioned to AAA Norfolk.
June 2: RHP Mike Wright optioned to AAA Norfolk.
June 3: RHP Mike Wright recalled from AAA Norfolk.
June 14: RHP Odrisamer Despaigne recalled from AAA Norfolk.
June 18: LHP T.J. McFarland and RHP Mike Wright optioned to AAA Norfolk.
June 21: RHP Oliver Drake recalled from AAA Norfolk.
June 22: LHP Ashur Tolliver recalled from AAA Norfolk.
June 25: LHP T.J. McFarland recalled from AAA Norfolk.
June 26: LHP T.J. McFarland optioned to AAA Norfolk.
June 27: LHP Ashur Tolliver optioned to AAA Norfolk.
June 28: LHP T.J. McFarland recalled from AAA Norfolk.
June 30: RHP Oliver Drake and C Francisco Pena optioned to AAA Norfolk.

July 3: RHP Tyler Wilson optioned to AAA Norfolk.
July 4: LHP Ariel Miranda optioned to AAA Norfolk; RF Dariel ALvarez recalled from AAA Norfolk; LHP Jayson Aquino recalled from AA Bowie.
July 7: RF Dariel Alvarez optioned to AAA Norfolk; LHP Jayson Aquino optioned to AA Bowie.
July 8: RHP Mike Wright recalled from AAA Norfolk.
July 9: RHP Mike Wright optioned to AAA Norfolk; RHP Jason Garcia recalled from AA Bowie.
July 11: RHP Jason Garcia optioned to AA Bowie.
July 19: OF Henry Urrutia designated for assignment.
July 22: RF Dariel Alvarez recalled from AAA Norfolk.
July 23: RHP Tyler Wilson recalled from AAA Norfolk.
July 24: LHP Donnie Hart optioned to AA Bowie.
July 26: RF Dariel Alvarez optioned to AAA Norfolk; CF Julio Bourbon designated for assignment.
July 29: RHP Chaz Roe designated for assignment.

August 2: RHP Odrisamer Despaigne and RHP Tyler Wilson optioned to AAA Norfolk.
August 12: RHP Logan Ondrusek optioned to AA Bowie; LHP Donnie Hart recalled from AA Bowie.
August 13: RHP Tyler Wilson recalled from AAA Norfolk.
August 20: RHP Tyler Wilson optioned to AAA Norfolk; C Francisco Pena & RHP Odrisamer Despaigne recalled from AAA Norfolk.
August 21: RHP Parker Bridwell recalled from AAA Norfolk; RHP Odrisamer Despaigne optioned to AAA Norfolk.
August 22: C Caleb Joseph optioned to AAA Norfolk.
August 24: RHP Mike Wright recalled from AAA Norfolk.
August 25: RHP Parker Bridwell optioned to AAA Norfolk; RHP Logan Ondrusek recalled from AA Bowie.
August 26: RHP Logan Ondrusek designated for assignment.
August 27: RHP Mike Wright optioned to AAA Norfolk.
August 28: LHP T.J. McFarland and CF Julio Borbon designated for assignment; RHP Oliver Drake recalled from AAA Norfolk.
August 29: LHP T.J. McFarland optioned to AAA Norfolk.
August 31: LHP Ashur Tolliver designated for assignment.

September 2: CF Michael Bourn and CF Drew Stubbs activated; C Caleb Joseph, LHP Jayson Aquino, and RHP Tyler Wilson recalled from AAA Norfolk.
September 5: RHP Odrisamer Despaigne designated for assignment.
September 15: RHP Mike Wright recalled from AAA Norfolk; LHP Chris Lee recalled from AA Bowie.

October 3: RF Dariel Alvarez, RHP Parker Bridwell, LF Christian Walker, and LHP T.J. McFarland recalled from AAA Norfolk; RHP Jason Garcia recalled from AA Bowie.
October 4: SS Paul Janish, C Francisco Pena, RF Dariel Alvarez, LF Christian Walker, LHP Wade Miley, RHP Vance Worley, RHP Tyler Wilson, RHP Mike Wright, RHP Kevin Gausman, LHP T.J. McFarland, RHP Parker Bridwell, RHP Jason Garcia, RHP Yovani Gallardo, LHP Jayson Aquino, and RHP Oliver Drake reassigned to the minor leagues.
October 5: SS Paul Janish, C Francisco Pena, RF Dariel Alvarez, LF Christian Walker, LHP Wade Miley, RHP Vance Worley, RHP Tyler Wilson, RHP Mike Wright, RHP Kevin Gausman, LHP T.J. McFarland, RHP Parker Bridwell, RHP Jason Garcia, RHP Yovani Gallardo, LHP Jayson Aquino, and RHP Oliver Drake activated.
October 7: SS Paul Janish designated for assignment.

==== Injuries etc. ====
April 3: LHP Brian Matusz (left intercostal strain), RHP Kevin Gausman (right shoulder strain), and DH Jimmy Paredes (left wrist sprain) placed on 15-day disabled list, retroactive to March 25.
April 23: RHP Yovani Gallardo (tendinitis) placed on 15-day disabled list; LHP Brian Matusz activated from 15-day disabled list.
April 25: RHP Kevin Gausman activated from 15-day disabled list.

May 3: IF JJ Hardy (left foot fracture) placed on 15-day disabled list, retroactive to May 2.
May 31: C Caleb Joseph (testicular injury) placed on 15-day disabled list.

June 3: RHP Darren O'Day (right hamstring strain) placed on 15-day disabled list.
June 14: RHP Vance Worley (right groin strain) placed on the 15-day disabled list, retroactive to June 13.
June 18: SS J.J. Hardy and RHP Yovani Gallardo activated from 15-day disabled list.
June 19: Roster status of 3B Manny Machado changed (suspension).
June 22: LHP Brian Duensing (left elbow inflammation) placed in 15-day disabled list, retroactive to June 20.
June 24: 3B Manny Machado activated (suspension).
June 30: RHP Vance Worley and C Caleb Joseph activated from 15-day disabled list; LHP T.J. McFarland (left knee inflammation) placed on the 15-day disabled list.

July 3: LHP Brian Duensing (left elbow inflammation) transferred from 15-day disabled list to 60-day disabled list.
July 4: DH Pedro Alvarez placed on the bereavement list.
July 7: DH Pedro Alvarez activated from the bereavement list.
July 19: OF Hyun Soo Kim (right hamstring strain) placed on the 15-day disabled list, retroactive to July 11.
July 22: LF Joey Rickard (right thumb ligament injury) placed on the 15-day disabled list, retroactive to July 21, 2016.
July 23: RHP Ubaldo Jiménez placed on the paternity list.
July 24: RHP Darren O'Day activated from 15-day disabled list.
July 26: OF Hyun Soo Kim activated from 15-day disabled list; RHP Ubaldo Jiménez activated from the paternity list .

August 13: RHP Darren O'Day (right shoulder rotator cuff strain) placed on 15-day disabled list, retroactive to August 12.
August 20: C Matt Weiters placed on the paternity list.
August 22: C Matt Weiters activated from the paternity list.
August 24: RHP Chris Tillman (right shoulder bursitis) placed on 15-day disabled list, retroactive to August 21.
August 26: LHP T.J. McFarland activated from 15-day disabled list.
August 31: LF Joey Rickard (right thumb ligament injury) transferred from 15-day disabled list to 60-day disabled list.

September 5: LHP Brian Duensing activated from the 60-day disabled list.
September 11: RHP Chris Tillman activated from the 15-day disabled list.
September 15: LHP Chris Lee (left shoulder strain) placed on 60-day disabled list.
September 18: RHP Darren O'Day activated from the 15-day disabled list; 1B Steve Pearce (right flexor mass strain) placed on 60-day disabled list.
September 27: LHP Wade Miley placed on the paternity list.
September 30: LHP Wade Miley activated from the paternity list.

=== Season highlights ===
- The Orioles started the season 7–0, the best start in team history.
- The Orioles set the Major League record for most home runs hit by a team for the month of June with 56, breaking the previous record of 55 set by the 1996 Oakland Athletics.
- The Orioles tied the Major League record for most home runs hit by a team for the month of August with 55.
- The Orioles became the only team in Major League history to hit 55+ home runs in two separate months.
- Hit 250+ home runs for the 2nd time in franchise history (1996), becoming the first franchise to hit at least 250 home runs in a season twice.
- First team since 1947-1950 Pittsburgh Pirates to have the Major League home run leader for four consecutive seasons.
- First AL team to have three different consecutive Major League home run leaders.
- Mark Trumbo led the Majors with 47 home runs.
- Zach Britton led the AL with 47 saves.

== Season standings ==
=== American League East ===
AL East
Team	W	L	Pct.	GB	Home	Road
Boston Red Sox	93	69	.574	—	47‍–‍34	46‍–‍35
Toronto Blue Jays	89	73	.549	4	51‍–‍30	38‍–‍43
Baltimore Orioles	89	73	.549	4	50‍–‍31	39‍–‍42
New York Yankees	84	78	.519	9	48‍–‍33	36‍–‍45
Tampa Bay Rays	68	94	.420	25	36‍–‍45	32‍–‍49

=== American League Wild Card ===
Division leaders
Team	W	L	Pct.
Texas Rangers	95	67	.586
Cleveland Indians	94	67	.584
Boston Red Sox	93	69	.574

Wild Card teams (Top 2 teams qualify for postseason)
Team	W	L	Pct.	GB
Toronto Blue Jays	89	73	.549	—
Baltimore Orioles	89	73	.549	—
Detroit Tigers	86	75	.534	2½
Seattle Mariners	86	76	.531	3
New York Yankees	84	78	.519	5
Houston Astros	84	78	.519	5
Kansas City Royals	81	81	.500	8
Chicago White Sox	78	84	.481	11
Los Angeles Angels	74	88	.457	15
Oakland Athletics	69	93	.426	20
Tampa Bay Rays	68	94	.420	21
Minnesota Twins	59	103	.364	30

=== Record vs. opponents ===
2016 American League record Source: MLB Standings Grid – 2016
Team	BAL	BOS	CWS	CLE	DET	HOU	KC	LAA	MIN	NYY	OAK	SEA	TB	TEX	TOR	NL
Baltimore	—	8–11	4–3	5–1	5–2	1–6	4–2	4–2	5–1	10–9	3–4	1–6	13–6	3–4	9–10	14–6
Boston	11–8	—	3–4	4–2	2–5	5–2	2–4	4–3	4–3	11–8	5–1	4–3	12–7	3–3	9–10	14–6
Chicago	3–4	4–3	—	8–11	7–12	3–3	5–14	2–5	12–7	3–3	5–2	4–3	4–3	4–2	5–1	9–11
Cleveland	1–5	2–4	11–8	—	14–4	3–4	14–5	6–1	10–9	2–5	4–2	3–4	5–1	2–5	4–3	13–7
Detroit	2–5	5–2	12–7	4–14	—	4–2	7–12	2–4	15–4	3–3	4–3	4–3	6–1	2–4	3–4	13–7
Houston	6–1	2–5	3–3	4–3	2–4	—	3–4	13–6	5–2	2–4	13–6	11–8	3–3	4–15	2–5	11–9
Kansas City	2–4	4–2	14–5	5–14	12–7	4–3	—	1–5	15–4	2–5	1–6	3–4	5–2	1–6	2–4	10–10
Los Angeles	2–4	3–4	5–2	1–6	4–2	6–13	5–1	—	2–4	1–6	12–7	8–11	3–4	9–10	4–3	9–11
Minnesota	1–5	3–4	7–12	9–10	4–15	2–5	4–15	4–2	—	2–5	2–4	4–2	3–4	5–2	1–6	8–12
New York	9–10	8–11	3–3	5–2	3–3	4–2	5–2	6–1	5–2	—	4–3	3–3	11–8	3–4	7–12	8–12
Oakland	4–3	1–5	2–5	2–4	3–4	6–13	6–1	7–12	4–2	3–4	—	7–12	5–2	9–10	3–3	7–13
Seattle	6–1	3–4	3–4	4–3	3–4	8–11	4–3	11–8	2–4	3–3	12–7	—	4–2	7–12	3–3	13–7
Tampa Bay	6–13	7–12	3–4	1–5	1–6	3–3	2–5	4–3	4–3	8–11	2–5	2–4	—	4–2	11–8	10–10
Texas	4–3	3–3	2–4	5–2	4–2	15–4	6–1	10–9	2–5	4–3	10–9	12–7	2–4	—	3–4	13–7
Toronto	10–9	10–9	1–5	3–4	4–3	5–2	4–2	3–4	6–1	12–7	3–3	3–3	8–11	4–3	—	13–7

== Game log ==
Legend
Orioles Win	Orioles Loss	Game postponed	Clinched Playoff Spot
**Bold** denotes an Orioles pitcher

Baltimore Orioles 2016 Season Game Log — Season Record: 89–73 (.549)
April: 14–9 (Home: 9–2; Away: 5–7)

#	Date	Opponent	Score	Win	Loss	Save	Attendance	Record	Box/ Streak
1	April 4	Twins	3–2	**Britton** (1–0)	Jepsen (0–1)	—	45,785	1–0	W1
2	April 6	Twins	4–2	**Gallardo** (1–0)	Gibson (0–1)	**Britton** (1)	12,622	2–0	W2
3	April 7	Twins	4–2	**Jiménez** (1–0)	Hughes (0–1)	**O'Day** (1)	11,142	3–0	W3
4	April 8	Rays	6–1	**Tillman** (1–0)	Archer (0–2)	—	17,304	4–0	W4
—	April 9	Rays	Postponed (rain). Makeup date June 25 as part of doubleheader.						
5	April 10	Rays	5–3	**Brach** (1–0)	Odorizzi (0–1)	**Britton** (2)	23,101	5–0	W5
6	April 11	@ Red Sox	9–7	**Brach** (2–0)	Kimbrel (0–1)	**Britton** (3)	37,160	6–0	W6
7	April 12	@ Red Sox	9–5	**Wright** (1–0)	Buchholz (0–1)	—	31,114	7–0	W7
8	April 13	@ Red Sox	2–4	Kelly (1–0)	**Jiménez** (1–1)	Kimbrel (2)	31,011	7–1	L1
9	April 14	@ Rangers	3–6	Wilhelmsen (1–0)	**Tillman** (1–1)	Tolleson (3)	22,820	7–2	L2
10	April 15	@ Rangers	11–5	**Worley** (1–0)	Wilhelmsen (1–1)	—	32,628	8–2	W1
11	April 16	@ Rangers	4–8	Kela (1–0)	**McFarland** (0–1)	—	39,493	8–3	L1
—	April 17	@ Rangers	Postponed (rain). Makeup date June 20						
12	April 19	Blue Jays	3–4	Stroman (3–0)	**Wright** (1–1)	Osuna (5)	16,783	8–4	L2
13	April 20	Blue Jays	4–3 (10)	**Givens** (1–0)	Biagini (0–1)	—	15,404	9–4	W1
14	April 21	Blue Jays	3–2	**O'Day** (1–0)	Cecil (0–3)	**Britton** (4)	17,644	10–4	W2
15	April 22	@ Royals	2–4	Young (1–3)	**Gallardo** (1–1)	Davis (7)	29,546	10–5	L1
16	April 23	@ Royals	8–3	**Wilson** (1–0)	Medlen (1–1)	—	39,900	11–5	W1
17	April 24	@ Royals	1–6	Ventura (2–0)	**Wright** (1–2)	—	34,748	11–6	L1
18	April 25	@ Rays	0–2	Archer (1–4)	**Gausman** (0–1)	Colomé (4)	12,996	11–7	L2
19	April 26	@ Rays	1–3	Romero (1–0)	**Jiménez** (1–2)	Colomé (5)	10,988	11–8	L3
20	April 27	@ Rays	3–1	**Tillman** (2–1)	Moore (1–2)	**Britton** (5)	11,850	12–8	W1
21	April 28	White Sox	10–2	**Givens** (2–0)	Danks (0–4)	—	14,568	13–8	W2
22	April 29	White Sox	6–3	**Brach** (3–0)	Rodon (1–3)	**Britton** (6)	19,912	14–8	W3
23	April 30	White Sox	7–8	Jones (2–0)	**Britton** (1–1)	—	29,152	14–9	L1

May: 14–13 (Home: 8–8; Away: 6–5)

#	Date	Opponent	Score	Win	Loss	Save	Attendance	Record	Box/ Streak
24	May 1	White Sox	1–7	Sale (6–0)	**Jiménez** (1–3)	—	28,803	14–10	L2
25	May 3	Yankees	4–1	**Tillman** (3–1)	Severino (0–4)	**O'Day** (2)	16,083	15–10	W1
26	May 4	Yankees	0–7	Sabathia (2–2)	**Wilson** (1–1)	—	15,998	15–11	L1
27	May 5	Yankees	1–0 (10)	**Britton** (2–1)	Barbato (1–2)	—	19,598	16–11	W1
—	May 6	Athletics	Postponed (rain). Makeup date May 7 as part of doubleheader.						
28	May 7	Athletics	4–8	Hill (4–3)	**Wright** (1–3)	—	15,110	16–12	L1
29	May 7	Athletics	5–2	**Jiménez** (2–3)	Hahn (1–1)	**Britton** (7)	29,862	17–12	W1
30	May 8	Athletics	11–3	**Tillman** (4–1)	Graveman (1–4)	—	43,690	18–12	W2
—	May 9	@ Twins	Postponed (rain). Makeup date July 28.						
31	May 10	@ Twins	5–3	**O'Day** (2–0)	Jepsen (2–4)	**Britton** (8)	21,586	19–12	W3
32	May 11	@ Twins	9–2	**Wilson** (2–1)	Hughes (1–6)	—	25,094	20–12	W4
33	May 12	Tigers	7–5	**Worley** (2–0)	Wilson (0–1)	**Britton** (9)	14,918	21–12	W5
34	May 13	Tigers	1-0	**Tillman** (5–1)	Verlander (2–4)	**Britton** (10)	30,488	22–12	W6
35	May 14	Tigers	9–3	**Wright** (2–3)	Sánchez (3–4)	**Brach** (1)	32,174	23–12	W7
36	May 15	Tigers	5–6	Saupold (1–0)	**O'Day** (2–1)	Rodríguez (9)	37,890	23–13	L1
37	May 17	Mariners	0–10	Miley (4–2)	**Jiménez** (2–4)	—	14,477	23–14	L2
38	May 18	Mariners	5–2	**Tillman** (6–1)	Walker (2–3)	**Britton** (11)	21,267	24–14	W1
39	May 19	Mariners	2–7	Karns (4–1)	**Wilson** (2–2)	—	35,012	24–15	L1
40	May 20	@ Angels	9–4	**Givens** (3–0)	Álvarez (1–2)	—	40,987	25–15	W1
41	May 21	@ Angels	3–1	**Brach** (4–0)	Smith (1–3)	**Britton** (12)	40,137	26–15	W2
42	May 22	@ Angels	2–10	Weaver (4–3)	**Jiménez** (2–5)	—	41,280	26–16	L1
43	May 24	@ Astros	2–3 (13)	Feliz (2–1)	**Bundy** (0–1)	—	24,783	26–17	L2
44	May 25	@ Astros	3–4	Neshek (2–0)	**Wilson** (2–3)	Gregerson (10)	25,618	26–18	L3
45	May 26	@ Astros	2–4	McCullers (1–1)	**Gausman** (0–2)	Giles (1)	23,826	26–19	L4
46	May 27	@ Indians	6–4	**Bundy** (1–1)	McAllister (2–2)	**Britton** (13)	21,054	27–19	W1
47	May 28	@ Indians	4–11	Salazar (5–3)	**Jiménez** (2–6)	—	21,110	27–20	L1
48	May 29	@ Indians	6–4	**Tillman** (7–1)	Manship (0–1)	**Britton** (14)	18,565	28–20	W1
49	May 30	Red Sox	2–7	Wright (5–4)	**Willson** (1–4)	—	43,926	28–21	L1
50	May 31	Red Sox	2–6	Rodríguez (1–0)	**Gausman** (0–3)	—	17,664	28–22	L2

June: 19–9 (Home: 14–3; Away: 5–6)

#	Date	Opponent	Score	Win	Loss	Save	Attendance	Record	Box/ Streak
51	June 1	Red Sox	13–9	**Brach** (5–0)	Buchholz (3–6)	**Britton** (15)	20,750	29–22	W1
52	June 2	Red Sox	12–7	**Givens** (4–0)	Ross (0–1)	—	21,534	30–22	W2
53	June 3	Yankees	6–5	**Givens** (5–0)	Betances (2–3)	**Britton** (16)	25,220	31–22	W3
54	June 4	Yankees	6–8	Nova (4–3)	**Wilson** (2–5)	Chapman (9)	33,170	31–23	L1
55	June 5	Yankees	3–1	**McFarland** (1–1)	Betances (2–4)	**Britton** (17)	28,807	32–23	W1
56	June 6	Royals	4–1	**Wright** (3–3)	Duffy (1–1)	**Britton** (18)	14,878	33–23	W2
57	June 7	Royals	9–1	**Jiménez** (3–6)	Ventura (4–4)	—	28,110	34–23	W3
58	June 8	Royals	4–0	**Tillman** (8–1)	Vólquez (5–6)	**Brach** (2)	19,178	35–23	W4
59	June 9	@ Blue Jays	6–5	**Bundy** (2–1)	Osuna (2–1)	**Britton** (19)	41,448	36–23	W5
60	June 10	@ Blue Jays	3–4 (10)	Storen (1–2)	**Brach** (5–1)	—	44,439	36–24	L1
61	June 11	@ Blue Jays	6–11	Happ (7–3)	**McFarland** (1–2)	—	47,651	36–25	L2
62	June 12	@ Blue Jays	9–10	Sanchez (6–1)	**Jiménez** (3–7)	Grilli (3)	47,249	36–26	L3
63	June 14	@ Red Sox	3–2	**Tillman** (9–1)	Price (7–4)	**Britton** (20)	38,009	37–26	W1
64	June 15	@ Red Sox	4–6	Wright (8–4)	**Gausman** (0–4)	Kimbrel (15)	36,233	37–27	L1
65	June 16	@ Red Sox	5–1	**Wilson** (3–5)	Rodríguez (1–2)	—	36,757	38–27	W1
66	June 17	Blue Jays	3–13	Happ (8–3)	**Wright** (3–4)	—	38,306	38–28	L1
67	June 18	Blue Jays	4–2	**Gallardo** (2–1)	Dickey (4–8)	**Britton** (21)	41,901	39–28	W1
68	June 19	Blue Jays	11–6	**Tillman** (10–1)	Stroman (6–3)	—	39,024	40–28	W2
69	June 20	@ Rangers	3–4	Tolleson (2–2)	**Gausman** (0–5)	Dyson (14)	35,366	40–29	–L1
70	June 21	Padres	7–10	Quackenbush (5–3)	**Givens** (5–1)	Rodney (15)	23,876	40–30	L2
71	June 22	Padres	7–2	**Jiménez** (4–7)	Johnson (0–5)	—	23,785	41–30	W1
72	June 24	Rays	6–3	**Tolliver** (1–0)	Moore (3–5)	**Britton** (22)	44,956	42–30	W2
73	June 25	Rays	5–0	**Gausman** (1–5)	Andriese (6–1)	—	18,229	43–40	W3
74	June 25	Rays	8–6	**McFarland** (2-2)	Ramírez (7–6)	**Britton** (23)	33,040	44–30	W4
75	June 26	Rays	12–5	**Wilson** (4–5)	Smyly (2–8)		38,611	45–30	W5
76	June 28	@ Padres	11–7	**Jiménez** (5–7)	Johnson (0–6)	—	31,515	46–30	W6
77	June 29	@ Padres	12–6	**Gallardo** (3–1)	Friedrich (4–3)	—	25,221	47–30	W7
78	June 30	@ Mariners	3–5	Walker (4–6)	**Tillman** (10–2)	Cishek (19)	23,715	47–31	L1

July: 12–14 (Home: 6–3; Away: 6–11)

#	Date	Opponent	Score	Win	Loss	Save	Attendance	Record	Box/ Streak
79	July 1	@ Mariners	2–5	LeBlanc (1–0)	**Gausman** (1–6)	Cishek (20)	33,006	47–32	L2
80	July 2	@ Mariners	6–12	Paxton (2–3)	**Wilson** (4–6)	Karns (1)	29,362	47–33	L3
81	July 3	@ Mariners	4–9	Iwakuma (8–6)	**Jiménez** (5–8)	—	31,405	47–34	L4
82	July 4	@ Dodgers	5–7	Blanton (4–2)	**Despaigne** (0–1)	Jansen (25)	47,378	47–35	L5
83	July 5	@ Dodgers	4–1	**Tilman** (11–2)	Maeda (7–6)	**Britton** (24)	45,373	48–35	W1
84	July 6	@ Dodgers	6–4 (14)	**Givens** (6–1)	Hatcher (5–4)	**Britton** (25)	40,899	49–35	W2
85	July 8	Angels	5–9	Shoemaker (4–9)	**Jiménez** (5–9)	—	44,317	49–36	L1
86	July 9	Angels	3–2	**Brach** (6–1)	Smith (1–4)	**Britton** (26)	43,288	50–36	W1
87	July 10	Angels	4–2	**Tilman** (12–2)	Lincecum (1–3)	**Britton** (27)	32,963	51–36	W2
ASG	July 12	@ Petco Park	AL 4–2 NL	Kluber	Cueto	**Britton**	42.386	—	Box
88	July 15	@ Rays	4–3	**Givens** (7–1)	Archer (4–13)	**Britton** (28)	17,672	52–36	W3
89	July 16	@ Rays	2–1	**Tillman** (13–2)	Moore (5–7)	**Britton** (29)	18,638	53–36	W4
90	July 17	@ Rays	2–5	Odorizzi (4–5)	**Bundy** (2–2)	Colomé (20)	16,161	53–37	L1
91	July 18	@ Yankees	1–2	Nova (7–5)	**Gausman** (1–7)	Chapman (19)	31,102	53–38	L2
92	July 19	@ Yankees	1–7	Eovaldi (8–6)	**Worley** (2–1)	—	31,192	53–39	L3
93	July 20	@ Yankees	0–5	Pineda (4–9)	**Gallardo** (3–2)	—	35,681	53–40	L4
94	July 21	@ Yankees	4–1	**Tillman** (14–2)	Sabathia (5–8)	**Britton** (30)	42,476	54–40	W1
95	July 22	Indians	5–1	**Bundy** (3–2)	Bauer (7–4)	**Britton** (31)	39,358	55–40	W2
96	July 23	Indians	5–2	**Gausman** (2–7)	Tomlin (10–3)	**Britton** (32)	31,946	56–40	W3
97	July 24	Indians	5–3	**O'Day** (3–1)	Allen (2–4)	—	37,821	57–40	W4
98	July 25	Rockies	3–2 (10)	**Roe** (1–0)	Lyles (2–3)	—	19,361	58–40	W5
99	July 26	Rockies	3–6	Bettis (9–6)	**Tillman** (14–3)	Estévez (9)	23,677	58–41	L1
100	July 27	Rockies	1–3	Gray (7–4)	**Bundy** (3–3)	Estévez (10)	20,324	58–42	L2
101	July 28	@ Twins	2-6	Pressly (5–5)	**Despaigne** (0–2)	—	22,569	58–43	L3
102	July 29	@ Blue Jays	5-6	Estrada (6–4)	**Gausman** (2–8)	Osuna (21)	46,112	58–44	L4
103	July 30	@ Blue Jays	1–9	Happ (14–3)	**Gallardo** (3–3)	—	47,305	58–45	L5
104	July 31	@ Blue Jays	6–2 (12)	**Givens** (8–1)	Morales (0–1)	—	46,792	59–45	W1

August: 13–16 (Home: 6–8; Away: 7–8)

#	Date	Opponent	Score	Win	Loss	Save	Attendance	Record	Box/ Streak
105	August 2	Rangers	5–1	**Bundy** (4–3)	Darvish (2–3)	**O'Day** (3)	22,230	60–45	W2
106	August 3	Rangers	3–2	**Gausman** (3–8)	Hamels (12–3)	**Britton** (33)	24,552	61–45	W3
107	August 4	Rangers	3–5	Griffin (5–1)	**Miley** (7–9)	Dyson (23)	28,762	61–46	L1
108	August 5	@ White Sox	7–5	**Gallardo** (4–3)	González (2–6)	**Britton** (34)	26,553	62–46	W1
109	August 6	@ White Sox	2–4	Jones (5–2)	**Tillman** (14–4)	Robertson (27)	28,491	62–47	L1
110	August 7	@ White Sox	10–2	**Bundy** (5–3)	Shields (5–14)	—	31,040	63–47	W1
111	August 8	@ Athletics	2–3	Graveman (8–7)	**Gausman** (3–9)	Madson (23)	10,407	63–48	L1
112	August 9	@ Athletics	1–2	Neal (2–1)	**Miley** (7–10)	Madson (24)	13,573	63–49	L2
113	August 10	@ Athletics	0–1	Detwiler (1–0)	**Gallardo** (4–4)	Axford (2)	13,481	63–50	L3
114	August 11	@ Athletics	9–6	**Tillman** (15–4)	Triggs (1–0)	**Britton** (35)	16,610	64–50	W1
115	August 12	@ Giants	5–2	**Bundy** (6–3)	Cain (4–7)	**Britton** (36)	41,479	65–50	W2
116	August 13	@ Giants	2–6	Bumgarner (11–7)	**Gausman** (3–10)	Casilla (27)	41,456	65–51	L1
117	August 14	@ Giants	8–7	**Brach** (7–1)	Casilla (2–4)	**Britton** (37)	41,268	66–51	W1
118	August 16	Red Sox	3–5	Ziegler (3–6)	**Brach** (7–2)	Kimbrel (21)	26,014	66–52	L1
119	August 17	Red Sox	1–8 (7)	Price (11–8)	**Bundy** (6–4)	—	26,160	66–53	L2
120	August 18	Astros	13–5	**Gausman** (4–10)	Musgrove (1–1)	—	20,288	67–53	W1
121	August 19	Astros	8–15	Devenski (2–4)	**Jiménez** (5–10)	—	34,422	67–54	L1
122	August 20	Astros	2–12	Fiers (9–6)	**Tillman** (15–5)	—	39,373	67–55	L2
123	August 21	Astros	3–5	Keuchel (8–12)	**Gallardo** (4–5)	Giles (3)	29,734	67-56	L3
124	August 22	Nationals	4–3	**Bundy** (7–4)	Cole (0–1)	**Britton** (38)	31,660	68–56	W1
125	August 23	Nationals	8–1	**Gausman** (5–10)	López (2–2)	**Worley** (1)	26,697	69–56	W2
126	August 24	@ Nationals	10–8	**Miley** (8–10)	Roark (13–7)	—	39,100	70–56	W3
127	August 25	@ Nationals	0–4	Scherzer (14–7)	**Jiménez** (5–11)	—	39,722	70–57	L1
128	August 26	@ Yankees	4–14	Cessa (4–0)	**Gallardo** (4–6)	—	38,423	70–58	L2
129	August 27	@ Yankees	5–13	Layne (1–1)	**Bundy** (7–5)	—	38,843	70–59	L3
130	August 28	@ Yankees	5–0	**Gausman** (6–10)	Sabathia (8–11)	—	38,002	71–59	W1
131	August 29	Blue Jays	1–5	Estrada (8–6)	**Miley** (8–11)	—	15,532	71–60	L1
132	August 30	Blue Jays	5–3	**Brach** (8–2)	Grilli (5–4)	**Britton** (39)	16,083	72–60	W1
133	August 31	Blue Jays	3–5	Sanchez (13–2)	**Gallardo** (4–7)	—	16,161	72–61	L1

September/October: 17–12 (Home: 7–7; Away: 10–5)

#	Date	Opponent	Score	Win	Loss	Save	Attendance	Record	Box/ Streak
134	September 2	Yankees	8–0	**Bundy** (8–5)	Green (2–4)	—	24,226	73–61	W1
135	September 3	Yankees	2–0	**Gausman** (7–10)	Sabathia (8–12)	**Britton** (40)	30,855	74–61	W2
136	September 4	Yankees	2–5	Severino (2–8)	**Miley** (8–12)	Betances (8)	31,161	74–62	L1
137	September 5	@ Rays	7–3	**Jimenez** (6–11)	Andriese (6–7)	—	12,256	75–62	W1
138	September 6	@ Rays	11–2	**Gallardo** (5–7)	Odorizzi (9–6)	—	12,207	76–62	W2
139	September 7	@ Rays	7–6	Boxberger (3–0)	**Givens (8–2)**	Colomé (31)	10,537	76–63	L1
140	September 9	@ Tigers	3–4	Wilson (3–0)	**Brach** (8–3)	Rodríguez (40)	32,140	76–64	L2
141	September 10	@ Tigers	11–3	**Jiménez** (7–11)	Zimmermann (9–6)	—		77–64	W1
142	September 11	@ Tigers	3–1	**Tillman** (16–5)	Verlander (14–8)	**Britton** (41)	33,069	78–64	W2
143	September 12	@ Red Sox	2–12	Price (16–8)	**Miley** (8–13)	—	37,551	78–65	L1
144	September 13	@ Red Sox	6–3	**Bundy** (9–5)	Pomeranz (10–12)	**Britton** (42)	38,041	79–65	W1
145	September 14	@ Red Sox	1–0	**Gausman** (8–10)	Porcello (20–4)	**Britton** (43)	37,973	80–65	W2
146	September 15	Rays	6–7	Snell (6–8)	**Gallardo** (5–8)	Colomé (33)	19,233	80–66	L1
147	September 16	Rays	5–4	**Brach** (9–3)	Boxberger (4–2)	**Britton** (44)	30,094	81–66	W1
148	September 17	Rays	2–5	Andriese (8–7)	**Tillman** (16–6)	Colomé (34)	27,823	81–67	L1
149	September 18	Rays	2–1	**Brach** (10–3)	Garton (1–1)	**Britton** (45)	28,427	82–67	W1
150	September 19	Red Sox	2–5	Porcello (21–4)	**Bundy** (9–6)	—	18,456	82–68	L1
151	September 20	Red Sox	2–5	Rodríguez (3–7)	**Gausman** (8–11)	Kimbrel (28)	20,387	82–69	L2
152	September 21	Red Sox	1–5	Buchholz (8–10)	**Jiménez** (7–12)	—	20,865	82–70	L3
153	September 22	Red Sox	3–5	Price (17–8)	**Worley** (2–2)	Kimbrel (29)	26,788	82–71	L4
154	September 23	Diamondbacks	3–2 (12)	**Drake** (1–0)	Koch (1–1)	—	37,815	83–71	W1
155	September 24	Diamondbacks	6–1	**Miley** (9–13)	Ray (8–14)	—	40,610	84–71	W2
156	September 25	Diamondbacks	2–1	**Bundy** (10–6)	Shipley (4–5)	**Britton** (46)	31,229	85–71	W3
157	September 27	@ Blue Jays	1–5	Sanchez (14–2)	**Gausman** (8–12)	—	44,762	85–72	L1
158	September 28	@ Blue Jays	3–2	**Duensing** (1–0)	Osuna (3–3)	**Britton** (47)	44,668	86–72	W1
159	September 29	@ Blue Jays	4–0	**Jiménez** (8–12)	Stroman (9–10)	—	47,791	87–72	W2
160	September 30	@ Yankees	8–1	**Gallardo** (6–8)	Pineda (6–12)	—	33,955	88–72	W3
161	October 1	@ Yankees	3–7	Clippard (4–6)	**Brach** (10–4)	—	33,222	88–73	L1
162	October 2	@ Yankees	5–2	**Gausman** (9–12)	**Cessa** (4–4)	—	33,277	89–73	W1

== Post-season ==
=== Wild Card Game ===
The Orioles faced the Toronto Blue Jays in the Wild Card Game, losing 5–2 in 11 innings.

=== Post-season game log ===
Baltimore Orioles 2016 Post-season Game Log
American League Wild Card Game vs. Toronto Blue Jays

Date	Opponent	Score	Win	Loss	Save	Attendance	Series	Box
October 4	@ Blue Jays	2–5 (11)	Liriano (1–0)	Jiménez (0–1)	—	49,934	0–1	Box

=== Postseason rosters ===
Playoff rosters
American League Wild Card Game

- Pitchers: 29 Tommy Hunter 30 Chris Tillman 31 Ubaldo Jiménez 35 Brad Brach 37 Dylan Bundy 50 Brian Duensing 53 Zach Britton 56 Darren O'Day 58 Donnie Hart 60 Mychal Givens
- Catchers: 32 Matt Wieters 36 Caleb Joseph
- Infielders: 2 J. J. Hardy 3 Ryan Flaherty 6 Jonathan Schoop 13 Manny Machado 19 Chris Davis 24 Pedro Álvarez 67 Trey Mancini
- Outfielders: 1 Michael Bourn 10 Adam Jones 14 Nolan Reimold 18 Drew Stubbs 25 Hyun-soo Kim 45 Mark Trumbo

== Accolades ==
- Mark Trumbo: AL Co-Player of the Week (Week of April 17)
- Manny Machado: AL Player of the Month (April).
- Chris Davis: Al Player of the Week (Week of June 12)
- Mark Trumbo:

AL Sporting News Comeback Player of the Year Award
AL Silver Slugger Award – DH

- Zach Britton: Mariano Rivera Award

=== All-Star Game ===
The following Orioles were selected to participate in the 2016 Major League Baseball All-Star Game:

- Brad Brach (1st)
- Zach Britton (2nd)
- Manny Machado (3rd)
- Mark Trumbo (2nd)
- Matt Wieters (4th)

== Roster ==
2016 Baltimore Orioles
Roster
Pitchers: 64 Jayson Aquino; 35 Brad Brach; 68 Parker Bridwell; 53 Zach Britton; 37 Dylan Bundy; 43 Odrisamer Despaigne; 71 Oliver Drake; 50 Brian Duensing; 49 Yovani Gallardo; 39 Kevin Gausman; 60 Mychal Givens; 58 Donnie Hart; 29,41 Tommy Hunter; 31 Ubaldo Jiménez; 17 Brian Matusz; 66 T. J. McFarland; 38 Wade Miley; 41 Ariel Miranda; 56 Darren O'Day; 51 Logan Ondrusek; 65 Chaz Roe; 30 Chris Tillman; 40 Ashur Tolliver; 63 Tyler Wilson; 48 Vance Worley; 59 Mike Wright	Catchers: 36 Caleb Joseph; 27 Francisco Peña; 32 Matt Wieters; Infielders: 24 Pedro Álvarez; 19 Chris Davis; 3 Ryan Flaherty; 2 J. J. Hardy; 15 Paul Janish; 13 Manny Machado; 6 Jonathan Schoop	Outfielders: 12 Dariel Álvarez; 29 Julio Borbón; 1 Michael Bourn; 10 Adam Jones; 25 Hyun-soo Kim; 28 Steve Pearce; 14 Nolan Reimold; 23 Joey Rickard; 18 Drew Stubbs; 45 Mark Trumbo; Other batters: 67 Trey Mancini	Manager: 26 Buck Showalter; Coaches: 54 Dom Chiti (bullpen); 47 Scott Coolbaugh (hitting); 55 Einar Díaz (coach); 11 Bobby Dickerson (third base); 21 Wayne Kirby (first base); 52 Mark Quinn (assistant hitting); 77 John Russell (bench); 16 Dave Wallace (pitching)

== Team leaders ==
Hitting leaders
Stat	Player	Total
AVG	Manny Machado	.294
HR	Mark Trumbo	47
RBI	Mark Trumbo	108
R	Manny Machado	105
H	Manny Machado	188
SB	Joey Rickard	4

Pitching leaders
Stat	Player	Total
W	Chris Tillman	16
L	Ubaldo Jiménez / Kevin Gausman	12
ERA	Kevin Gausman	3.61
K	Kevin Gausman	174
IP	Kevin Gausman	179 2/3
SV	Zach Britton	47

== Player stats ==
=== Batting ===
Note: G = Games played; AB = At bats; R = Runs; H = Hits; 2B = Doubles; 3B = Triples; HR = Home runs; RBI = Runs batted in; SB = Stolen bases; BB = Walks; AVG = Batting average; SLG = Slugging average

Player	G	AB	R	H	2B	3B	HR	RBI	SB	BB	AVG	SLG
Manny Machado	157	640	105	188	40	1	37	96	0	48	.294	.533
Adam Jones	152	619	86	164	19	0	29	83	2	39	.265	.436
Jonathan Schoop	162	615	82	164	38	1	25	82	1	21	.267	.454
Mark Trumbo	159	613	94	157	27	1	47	108	2	51	.256	.533
Chris Davis	157	566	99	125	21	0	38	84	1	88	.221	.459
Matt Wieters	124	423	48	103	17	1	17	66	1	32	.243	.409
J.J. Hardy	115	405	43	109	29	0	9	48	0	26	.269	.407
Pedro Álvarez	109	337	43	84	20	0	22	49	1	37	.249	.504
Hyun Soo Kim	95	305	36	92	16	1	6	22	1	36	.302	.420
Joey Rickard	85	257	32	69	13	0	5	19	4	18	.268	.377
Nolan Reimold	104	203	25	45	9	1	6	15	1	22	.222	.365
Ryan Flaherty	74	157	16	34	7	0	3	15	2	17	.217	.318
Caleb Joseph	49	132	7	23	3	0	0	0	0	7	.174	.197
Steve Pearce	25	60	9	13	2	0	3	6	0	8	.217	.400
Michael Bourn	24	46	5	13	1	0	2	8	2	6	.283	.435
Francisco Peña	14	40	5	8	0	0	1	3	0	2	.200	.275
Paul Janish	14	31	3	6	1	0	0	0	0	3	.194	.226
Drew Stubbs	20	22	1	3	0	0	0	1	1	4	.136	.136
Trey Mancini	5	14	3	5	1	0	3	5	0	0	.357	1.071
Julio Borbon	6	13	1	4	0	0	0	0	0	0	.308	.308
Dariel Álvarez	2	3	0	1	1	0	0	0	0	1	.333	.667
Pitcher totals	162	23	1	3	0	0	0	0	0	2	.130	.130
Team totals	162	5524	744	1413	265	6	253	710	19	468	.256	.443

=== Pitching ===
Note: W = Wins; L = Losses; ERA = Earned run average; G = Games pitched; GS = Games started; SV = Saves; IP = Innings pitched; H = Hits allowed; R = Runs allowed; ER = Earned runs allowed; BB = Walks allowed; SO = Strikeouts

Player	W	L	ERA	G	GS	SV	IP	H	R	ER	BB	SO
Kevin Gausman	9	12	3.61	30	30	0	179.2	183	76	72	47	174
Chris Tillman	16	6	3.77	30	30	0	172.0	155	73	72	66	140
Ubaldo Jiménez	8	12	5.44	29	25	1	142.1	150	93	86	72	125
Yovani Gallardo	6	8	5.42	23	23	0	118.0	126	74	71	61	85
Dylan Bundy	10	6	4.02	36	14	0	109.2	109	52	49	42	104
Tyler Wilson	4	6	5.27	24	13	0	94.0	110	57	55	24	55
Vance Worley	2	2	3.53	35	4	1	86.2	84	37	34	35	56
Brad Brach	10	4	2.05	71	0	2	79.0	57	23	18	25	92
Mike Wright	3	4	5.79	18	12	0	74.2	81	53	48	26	50
Mychal Givens	8	2	3.13	66	0	0	74.2	59	28	26	36	96
Zach Britton	2	1	0.54	69	0	47	67.0	38	7	4	18	74
Wade Miley	2	5	6.17	11	11	0	54.0	70	38	37	15	55
Darren O'Day	3	1	3.77	34	0	3	31.0	25	13	13	13	38
Odrisamer Despaigne	0	2	5.60	16	0	0	27.1	32	18	17	15	17
TJ McFarland	2	2	6.93	16	0	0	24.2	33	19	19	10	7
Donnie Hart	0	0	0.49	22	0	0	18.1	12	1	1	6	12
Oliver Drake	1	0	4.00	14	0	0	18.0	11	11	8	7	21
Brian Duensing	1	0	4.05	14	0	0	13.1	13	6	6	3	10
Tommy Hunter	0	0	2.19	12	0	0	12.1	14	3	3	3	6
Chaz Roe	1	0	3.72	9	0	0	9.2	8	4	4	7	11
Logan Ondrusek	0	0	9.95	7	0	0	6.1	9	7	7	3	4
Brian Matusz	0	0	12.00	7	0	0	6.0	11	8	8	7	1
Ashur Tolliver	1	0	5.79	5	0	0	4.2	5	4	3	3	5
Parker Bridwell	0	0	13.50	2	0	0	3.1	5	5	5	1	3
Jayson Aquino	0	0	0.00	3	0	0	2.1	1	0	0	0	3
Ariel Miranda	0	0	13.50	1	0	0	2.0	4	3	3	0	4
Ryan Flaherty	0	0	18.00	1	0	0	1.0	3	2	2	0	0
Team totals	89	73	4.22	162	162	54	1432.0	1408	715	671	545	1248

== Farm system ==
Level	Team	League	Manager
AAA	Norfolk Tides	International League	Ron Johnson
AA	Bowie Baysox	Eastern League	Gary Kendall
A-Advanced	Frederick Keys	Carolina League	Keith Bodie
A	Delmarva Shorebirds	South Atlantic League	Ryan Minor
A-Short Season	Aberdeen IronBirds	New York–Penn League	Luis Pujols
Rookie	GCL Orioles	Gulf Coast League	Orlando Gómez
Rookie	DSL Orioles 1 & 2	Dominican Summer League	Elvis Morel & Nelson Norman
