= Odrisamer Despaigne =

Cuban baseball player (born 1987)

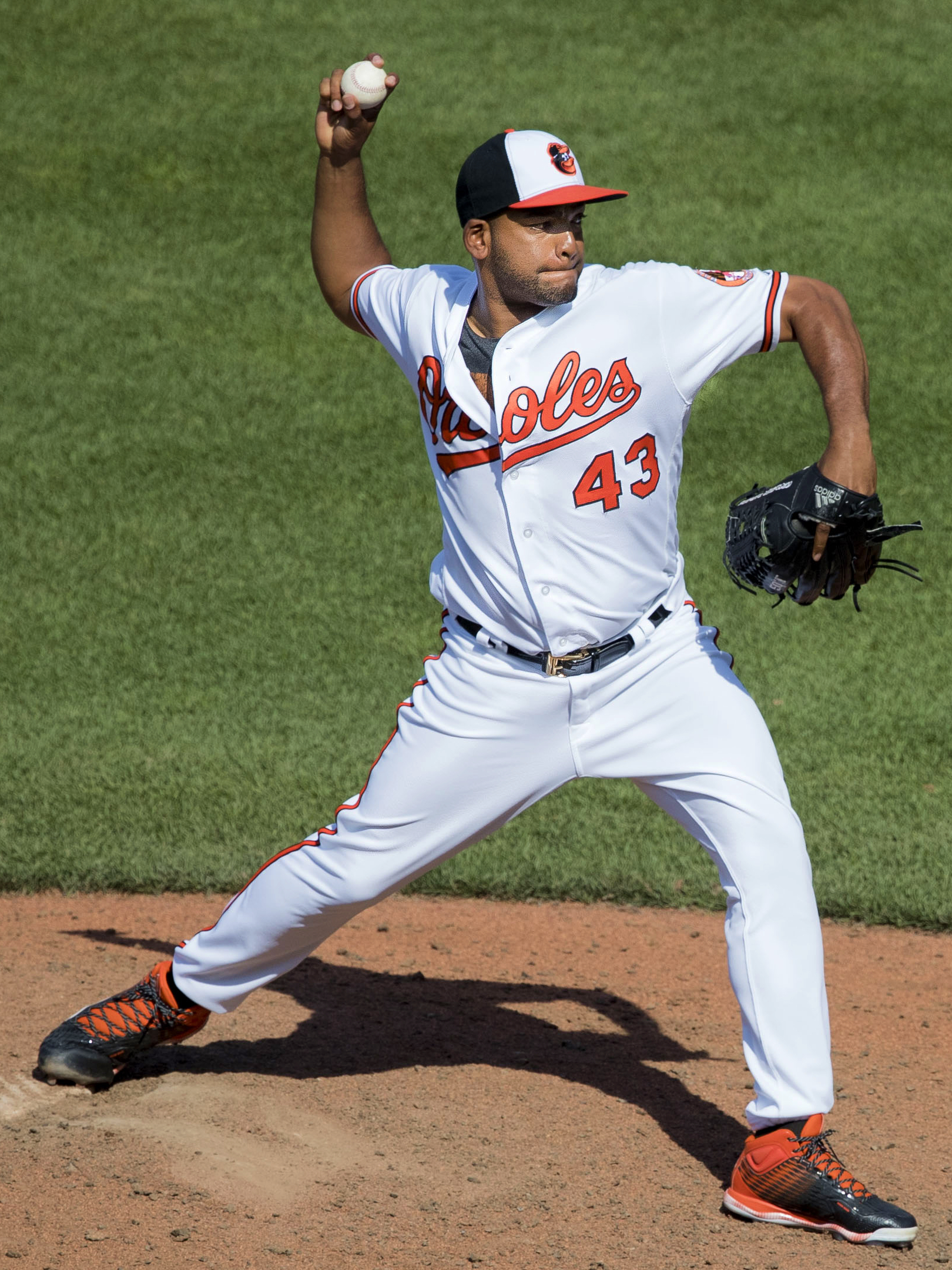
- Despaigne pitching for the Baltimore Orioles in 2016

Caliente de Durango – No. 40
- Pitcher
- Born: 4 April 1987 (age 39); Havana, Cuba
- Bats: Right Throws: Right

Professional debut
- MLB: 23 June, 2014, for the San Diego Padres
- KBO: 5 May, 2020, for the KT Wiz

MLB statistics (through 2019 season)
- Win–loss record: 13–26
- Earned run average: 5.11
- Strikeouts: 224

KBO statistics (through 2022 season)
- Win–loss record: 36–30
- Earned run average: 4.07
- Strikeouts: 440
- Stats at Baseball Reference

Teams
- San Diego Padres (2014–2015); Baltimore Orioles (2016); Miami Marlins (2016–2018); Los Angeles Angels (2018); Chicago White Sox (2019); KT Wiz (2020–2022)

Career highlights and awards
- Korean Series champion (2021)

Odrisamer Despaigne Orue (/ˈoʊdriːsəmɪər ˈdɛspɑːnjeɪ/ OH-dree-sə-meer DES-pahn-yay; born 4 April 1987) is a Cuban professional baseball pitcher for the Caliente de Durango of the Mexican League. He has previously played in Major League Baseball (MLB) for the San Diego Padres, Baltimore Orioles, Miami Marlins, Los Angeles Angels, and Chicago White Sox. He has also played in the KBO League for the KT Wiz, with whom he won the Korean Series in 2021.

== Career ==
=== Cuban career ===
Despaigne played for the Industriales of the Cuban National Series, making his debut in the league in 2007. He played for the Cuban national baseball team, and defected from Cuba while in Europe for the 2013 World Port Tournament. Despaigne became a legal resident of Spain, and traveled to Mexico.

=== San Diego Padres ===
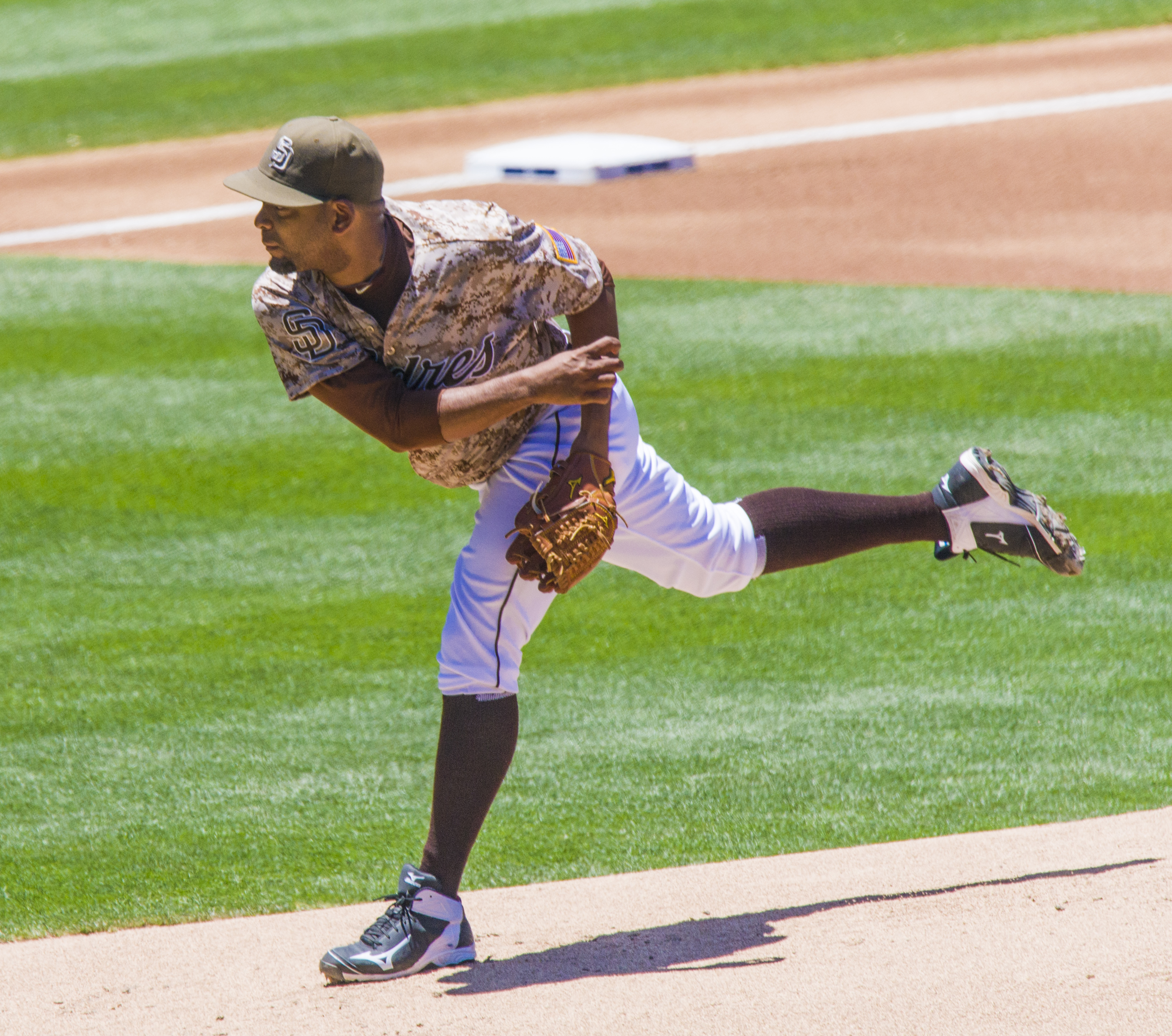
Despaigne pitching for the San Diego Padres in 2015

Despaigne and fellow Cuban defector Aledmys Díaz held a showcase for Major League Baseball teams on 13 February 2014. Despaigne signed a minor league contract with the San Diego Padres on 2 May. The Padres assigned Despaigne to the San Antonio Missions of the Double-A Texas League, where in two games started, he allowed one earned run in 7 2/3 innings pitched. The Padres promoted Despaigne to the El Paso Chihuahuas of the Triple-A Pacific Coast League on 26 May. Despaigne was called up by the Padres on 23 June to start that night against the San Francisco Giants. Despaigne pitched seven shutout innings, allowing four hits in his major league debut. In his fifth major league start on 20 July, Despaigne pitched 7 2/3 no-hit innings before the New York Mets' Daniel Murphy doubled. The Padres won the game 2–1.

=== Baltimore Orioles ===
On 4 February 2016, Despaigne was traded to the Baltimore Orioles in exchange for minor league pitcher Jean Cosme. He made 16 appearances for Baltimore, registering an 0-2 record and 5.60 ERA with 17 strikeouts across 27 1/3 innings pitched. Despaigne was designated for assignment by the Orioles on 5 September.

=== Miami Marlins ===
The Miami Marlins claimed Despaigne off waivers on 15 September 2016. He made three appearances down the stretch for the Marlins, recording a 9.00 ERA with no strikeouts over three innings of work.

Despaigne started a game for Miami against the New York Mets on 6 May 2017, allowing eight runs (three earned) in an 11–3 loss, and on 17 May returned as a relief pitcher, giving up two runs and four walks in one inning pitched. Despaigne was optioned to the Triple-A New Orleans Baby Cakes and was recalled on 28 July. He made 18 appearances (eight starts) for Miami, compiling a 2-3 record and 4.01 ERA with 31 strikeouts and one save across 58 1/3 innings pitched.

Despaigne made 11 appearances (one start) for the Marlins in 2018, accumulating a 2-0 record and 5.31 ERA with 18 strikeouts over 20 1/3 innings of work.

=== Los Angeles Angels ===
On 14 August 2018, the Marlins traded Despaigne to the Los Angeles Angels in exchange for cash considerations. He made his first start with the Angels on 17 August against the Texas Rangers. In eight appearances (four starts) for Los Angeles, Despaigne struggled to an 0-3 record and 8.20 ERA with 17 strikeouts across 18 2/3 innings pitched. He elected free agency on 5 November.

=== Cincinnati Reds ===
On 7 January 2019, Despaigne signed a minor league contract with the Cincinnati Reds. In eight starts for the Triple-A Louisville Bats, he posted a 3-2 record and 3.92 ERA with 40 strikeouts across 41 1/3 innings pitched. Despaigne opted out of his contract on 16 May.

=== Chicago White Sox ===
On 19 May 2019, Despaigne signed a minor league deal with the Chicago White Sox. He made his first start with the team on 10 June against the Washington Nationals. He finished 0–2 in 3 starts for the team. He elected free agency following the 2019 season.

=== KT Wiz ===
On 10 November 2019, Despaigne signed a one-year, $900,000 contract with the KT Wiz of the KBO League. On 16 December 2020, Despaigne re-signed with the Wiz for the 2021 season on a one-year, $800K contract. He posted a 13–10 record with a team-leading 3.39 ERA and 165 strikeouts over 33 starts. On 30 December 2021, Despaigne re-signed with the Wiz for the 2022 season on a one-year contract worth up to $1.35 million. He became a free agent after the 2022 season.

=== Mariachis de Guadalajara ===
On 24 February 2023, Despaigne signed with the Mariachis de Guadalajara of the Mexican League for the 2023 season. In 18 starts for Guadalajara, he compiled a 5–6 record and 5.22 ERA with 81 strikeouts across 98 1/3 innings pitched.

=== Leones de Yucatán ===
On 1 December 2023, Despaigne's rights were traded to the Leones de Yucatán in exchange for Anthony García. He made 18 starts for Yucatán in 2024, posting a 3–7 record and 4.74 ERA with 78 strikeouts across 98 2/3 innings pitched.

Despaigne made 16 appearances (13 starts) for the Leones in 2025, but struggled to a 3-6 record and 9.16 ERA with 40 strikeouts over 56 innings of work.

=== Caliente de Durango ===
On November 14, 2025, Despaigne and Webster Rivas were traded to the Caliente de Durango in exchange for Geraldi Díaz.

== See also ==
- List of baseball players who defected from Cuba
