= Ashur Tolliver =

American baseball player (born 1988)

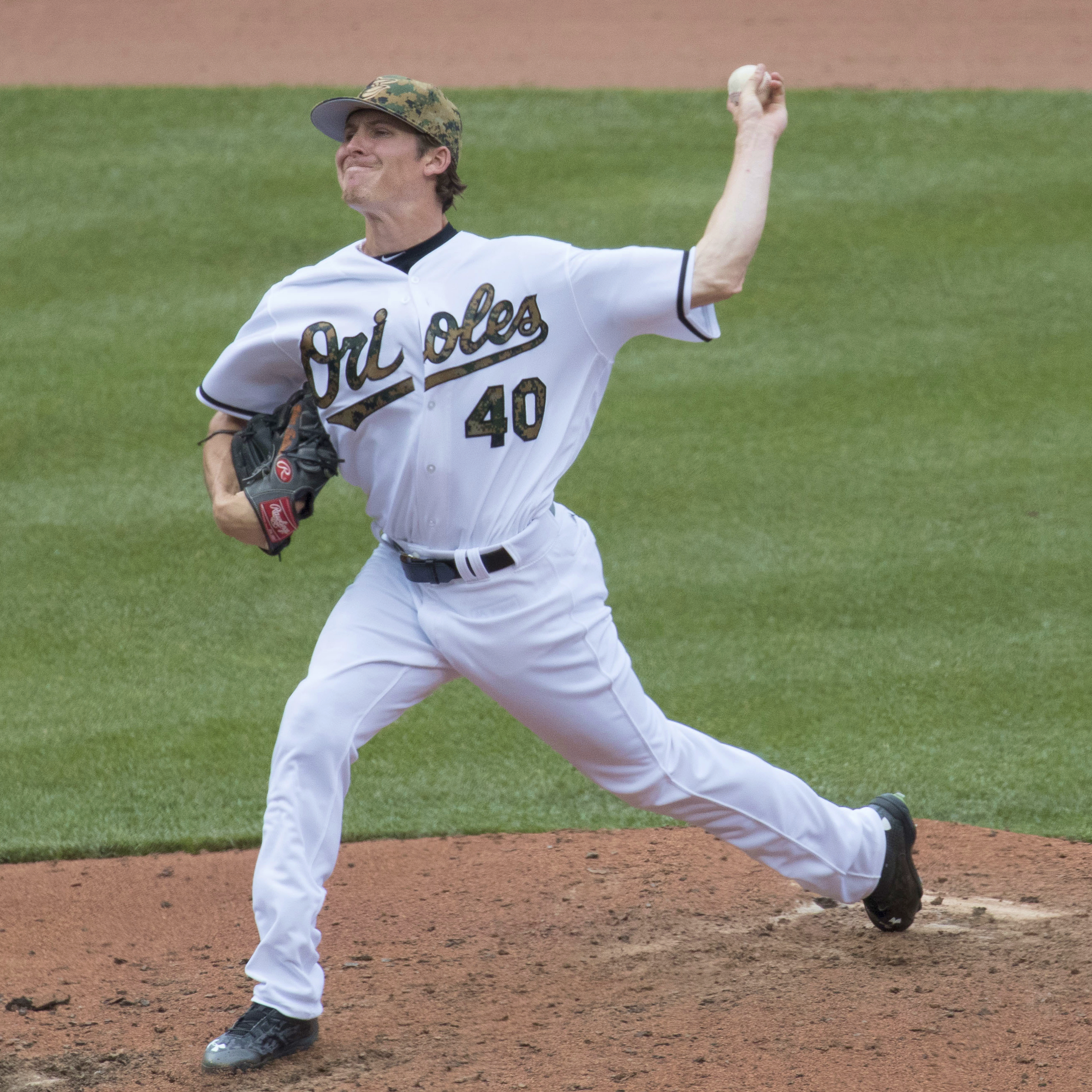
- Tolliver with the Baltimore Orioles
- Pitcher
- Born: January 24, 1988 (age 38); Little Rock, Arkansas, U.S.
- Batted: Left Threw: Left

MLB debut
- May 26, 2016, for the Baltimore Orioles

Last MLB appearance
- July 4, 2017, for the Houston Astros

MLB statistics
- Win–loss record: 1-0
- Earned run average: 4.66
- Strikeouts: 10
- Stats at Baseball Reference

Teams
- Baltimore Orioles (2016); Houston Astros (2017)

Ashur Jordan Tolliver (born January 24, 1988) is an American former professional baseball pitcher who played in Major League Baseball (MLB) for the Baltimore Orioles and Houston Astros in 2016 and 2017. Since 2017, he has served as Vice President and Marketing Director of Dive Bomb Industries, a waterfowl hunting equipment company.

== Career ==
=== Amateur ===
Tolliver attended Sylvan Hills High School in Sherwood, Arkansas, where he helped lead the team to three state championship games; winning titles in 2003 and 2005. He played college baseball at both the University of Arkansas at Little Rock and Oklahoma City University. In 2008, he played collegiate summer baseball with the Hyannis Mets of the Cape Cod Baseball League.

=== Baltimore Orioles ===
Tolliver was drafted by the Baltimore Orioles in the fifth round, 146th overall, of the 2009 Major League Baseball draft. He made his professional debut with the Low-A Aberdeen IronBirds. He returned to Aberdeen in 2010, posting a 5.77 ERA in 20 games. In 2011, Tolliver split the season between the High-A Frederick Keys and the Single-A Delmarva Shorebirds, pitching to a cumulative 2–3 record and 2.40 ERA in 29 games. Tolliver missed the entire 2012 season after undergoing shoulder surgery. In 2013, Tolliver again split the season between Frederick and Delmarva, posting a 2.98 ERA with 42 strikeouts in 48.1 innings of work. The following year, Tolliver split the season between Frederick and the Double-A Bowie Baysox, recording a 3–2 record and 2.89 ERA in 27 appearances. For the 2015 season, Tolliver returned to Bowie, logging a 2.91 ERA with 61 strikeouts in 58.2 innings pitched. On November 6, 2015, Tolliver elected free agency. On February 8, 2016, he re-signed with the Orioles organization on a minor league contract and received an invitation to Spring Training. He was assigned to Double-A Bowie to begin the year. While playing with Bowie, Tolliver made a bare-handed catch on a line drive that garnered national headlines.

Tolliver was selected to the 40-man roster and called up to the majors for the first time on May 23, 2016. He made his MLB debut on May 26, pitching 1.1 innings of relief against the Houston Astros and striking out 3. He was later optioned to the Triple-A Norfolk Tides, but was later recalled on June 22. Tolliver earned his first major league win on June 24 against the Tampa Bay Rays. On August 31, Tolliver was designated for assignment by Baltimore after posting a 5.79 ERA in 5 appearances.

=== Los Angeles Angels ===
On September 3, 2016, Tolliver was claimed off waivers by the Los Angeles Angels. He finished the year in the Angels organization, making one appearance apiece for the rookie-level Orem Owlz and the Double-A Arkansas Travelers. Tolliver was designated for assignment by the Angels in December with the hope of him getting through waivers.

=== Houston Astros ===
On December 5, 2016, Tolliver was claimed off waivers by the Houston Astros. He was assigned to the Triple-A Fresno Grizzlies of the Pacific Coast League to begin the 2017 season. Tolliver posted a 3.60 ERA in 3 appearances for Houston before he was outrighted off of the 40-man roster on July 25, 2017. On August 13, Tolliver was released by the Astros organization after struggling to a 7.13 ERA in 31 games for Fresno. The Astros would go on to win the 2017 World Series, and because Tolliver played with Houston in the 2017 season, he earned his first career championship title and World Series ring.

=== Seattle Mariners ===
On August 18, 2017, Tolliver signed a minor league contract with the Seattle Mariners organization. He finished the year with the Double-A Arkansas Travelers, where he registered a 3.38 ERA in 5 appearances. He elected free agency following the season on November 6.

=== Long Island Ducks ===
On April 11, 2018, Tolliver signed with the Long Island Ducks of the independent Atlantic League of Professional Baseball. Tolliver made 49 appearances out of the bullpen for the Ducks, recording a 4.34 ERA with 56 strikeouts.

=== High Point Rockers ===
On February 28, 2019, Tolliver was traded to the High Point Rockers of the Atlantic League of Professional Baseball. Tolliver was named an Atlantic League All-Star and finished the season with an 8–1 record and 2.94 ERA with 38 strikeouts in as many appearances. He became a free agent following the season.

As of August 2017, Tolliver was working as the Vice President for Dive Bomb Industries, a business in the waterfowl and outdoor industry.
