= Donnie Hart =

American baseball player (born 1990)

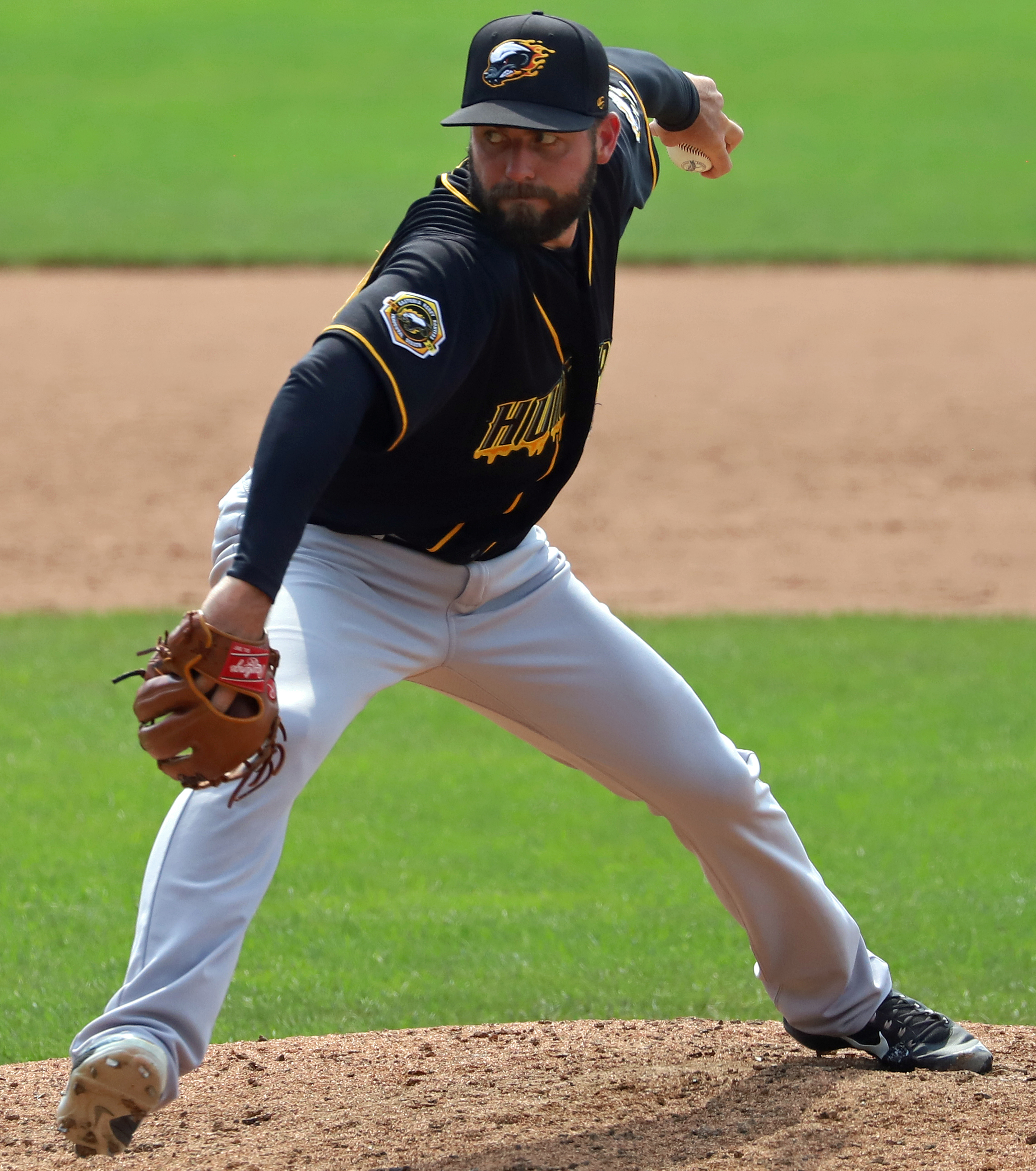
- Hart with the Gastonia Honey Hunters in 2021
- Pitcher / Coach
- Born: September 6, 1990 (age 35); Bedford, Texas, U.S.
- Batted: Left Threw: Left

MLB debut
- July 17, 2016, for the Baltimore Orioles

Last MLB appearance
- August 4, 2019, for the New York Mets

MLB statistics
- Win–loss record: 2–0
- Earned run average: 3.13
- Strikeouts: 57
- Stats at Baseball Reference

Teams
- Baltimore Orioles (2016–2018); Milwaukee Brewers (2019); New York Mets (2019)

Donnie Scott Hart (born September 6, 1990) is an American former professional baseball pitcher. He played in Major League Baseball (MLB) for the Baltimore Orioles, Milwaukee Brewers, and New York Mets.

== Career ==
Hart attended Seven Lakes High School in Katy, Texas. At Seven Lakes, he was a three-time all-district pitcher.

Hart played college baseball at Texas State University. As a sophomore, he allowed a .138 batting average to opposing hitters and, as a junior, he posted a team-leading 2.13 ERA.

=== Baltimore Orioles ===
Hart was drafted by the Baltimore Orioles in the 27th round, with the 819th overall selection, of the 2013 Major League Baseball draft.

After signing with the Orioles, Hart made his professional debut that season with the Low–A Aberdeen IronBirds, going 3–1 with a 2.25 ERA in 24 relief innings pitched. In 2014 he pitched for the Single–A Delmarva Shorebirds where he was 1–3 with a 3.68 ERA in 24 relief appearances, and in 2015, he played for Delmarva, the High–A Frederick Keys, and Double–A Bowie Baysox, pitching to a combined 6–2 record and 1.49 ERA in 54 1/3 innings pitched out of the bullpen. He began 2016 with Bowie.

Hart was promoted to the majors for the first time on July 14, 2016. He made his major league debut on July 17, throwing 2/3 innings while earning his first career strikeout. He made two more scoreless appearances for the Orioles the next two games before being optioned back to Double–A Bowie on July 24. Hart was recalled again on August 12, where he pitched 1 1/3 perfect innings out of the bullpen. He also had one at bat in the game, striking out. On September 22, Hart allowed the first run of his career, a solo home run to Hanley Ramírez in a game against the Boston Red Sox. The home run ended Hart's streak of 18 consecutive scoreless games to start his career and his 15 1/3 scoreless innings streak also came to an end. He ended his first year in the big leagues having pitched in 22 games while tossing 18 1/3 innings and only allowing one run (via solo home run). Hart pitched to a 0.49 ERA and 0.98 WHIP while striking out 12 batters and issuing six walks. Hart made the Orioles Wild Card Game roster and ended up pitching to one batter, inducing a fly out to end the seventh inning. The Orioles would go on to lose in the 11th inning, 5–2.

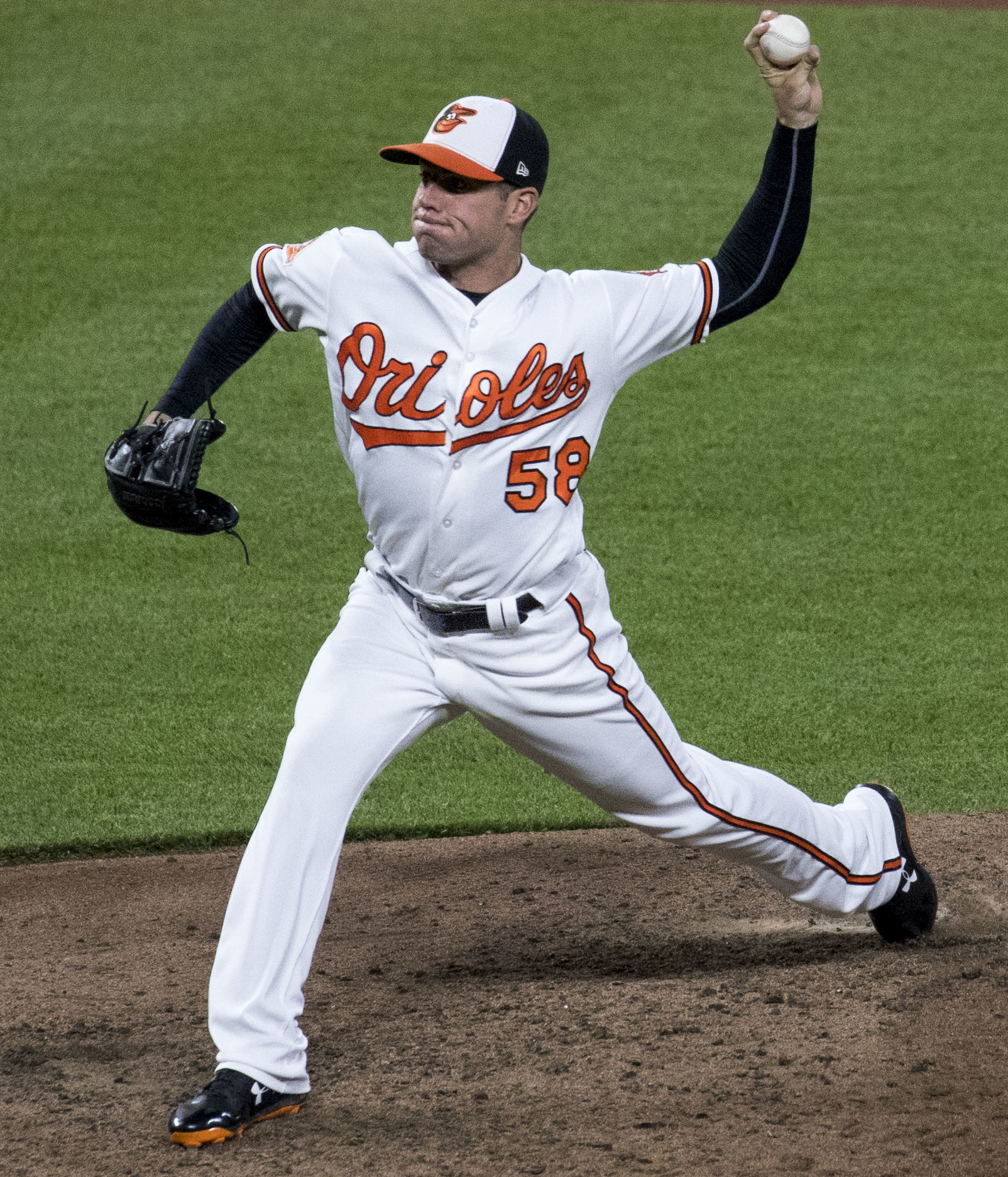
Hart with the Baltimore Orioles in 2017

Hart made Baltimore's 2017 Opening Day roster. On April 7, Hart earned his first career major league victory. The win came against the New York Yankees after Hart retired Starlin Castro in the seventh inning and teammate Seth Smith hit a go–ahead home run in the bottom half of the inning. Hart was optioned to the Triple–A Norfolk Tides and recalled to Baltimore multiple times during the season. In 13 relief appearances for Norfolk he was 1–0 with a 2.35 ERA and 45 strikeouts, and in 51 appearances for Baltimore, he was 2–0 with a 3.71 ERA and 13 strikeouts.

Hart began the 2018 season with Norfolk. He spent most of the season in the minors, pitching in 20 games only for the Orioles. He was designated for assignment when the Orioles reclaimed Hanser Alberto on waivers on March 1, 2019.

=== Milwaukee Brewers ===
On March 7, 2019, Hart was claimed off waivers by the Los Angeles Dodgers. On April 4, Hart was claimed off waivers by the Milwaukee Brewers. He made 4 scoreless appearances for Milwaukee, striking out 3 in 6 2/3 innings pitched. Hart was designated for assignment on July 31.

=== New York Mets ===
On August 3, 2019, Hart was claimed off waivers by the New York Mets. He was designated to the minor leagues on August 8 after only one appearance with the Mets. Hart elected free agency following the 2019 season.

=== Oakland Athletics ===
On February 4, 2020, Hart signed a minor league deal with the Oakland Athletics. Hart did not play in a game in 2020 due to the cancellation of the minor league season because of the COVID-19 pandemic. He became a free agent on November 2.

=== Gastonia Honey Hunters ===
On May 21, 2021, Hart signed with the Gastonia Honey Hunters of the Atlantic League of Professional Baseball. In 22 bullpen appearances, Hart posted a 2–2 record with a 3.48 ERA and 26 strikeouts.

=== Winnipeg Goldeyes ===
On August 2, 2021, Hart was traded to the Winnipeg Goldeyes of the American Association of Professional Baseball in exchange for LHP José José. Hart logged a 2.30 ERA with 20 strikeouts in 15 appearances for Winnipeg to finish out the year. On March 8, 2022, Hart was released by the Goldeyes.

=== Tecolotes de los Dos Laredos ===
On April 20, 2022, Hart signed with the Tecolotes de los Dos Laredos of the Mexican League. In 30 appearances for Dos Laredos, he logged a 1–1 record and 1.88 ERA with 22 strikeouts and 5 saves across 28 2/3 innings pitched.

Hart pitched in 37 games for Dos Laredos in 2023, recording a 2.81 ERA with 16 strikeouts over 25 2/3 innings of relief. In 2024, he made 26 appearances for the team, working to a 3–1 record and 6.89 ERA with 14 strikeouts over 15 2/3 innings of work.

On July 17, 2025, it was announced that Hart would begin serving as a player/coach. In 12 relief appearances, he registered a 4.70 ERA and allowed eight hits while striking out seven across 7 2/3 innings.

On March 9, 2026, Hart announced his retirement from professional baseball.
