= Joey Rickard =

American baseball player (born 1991)

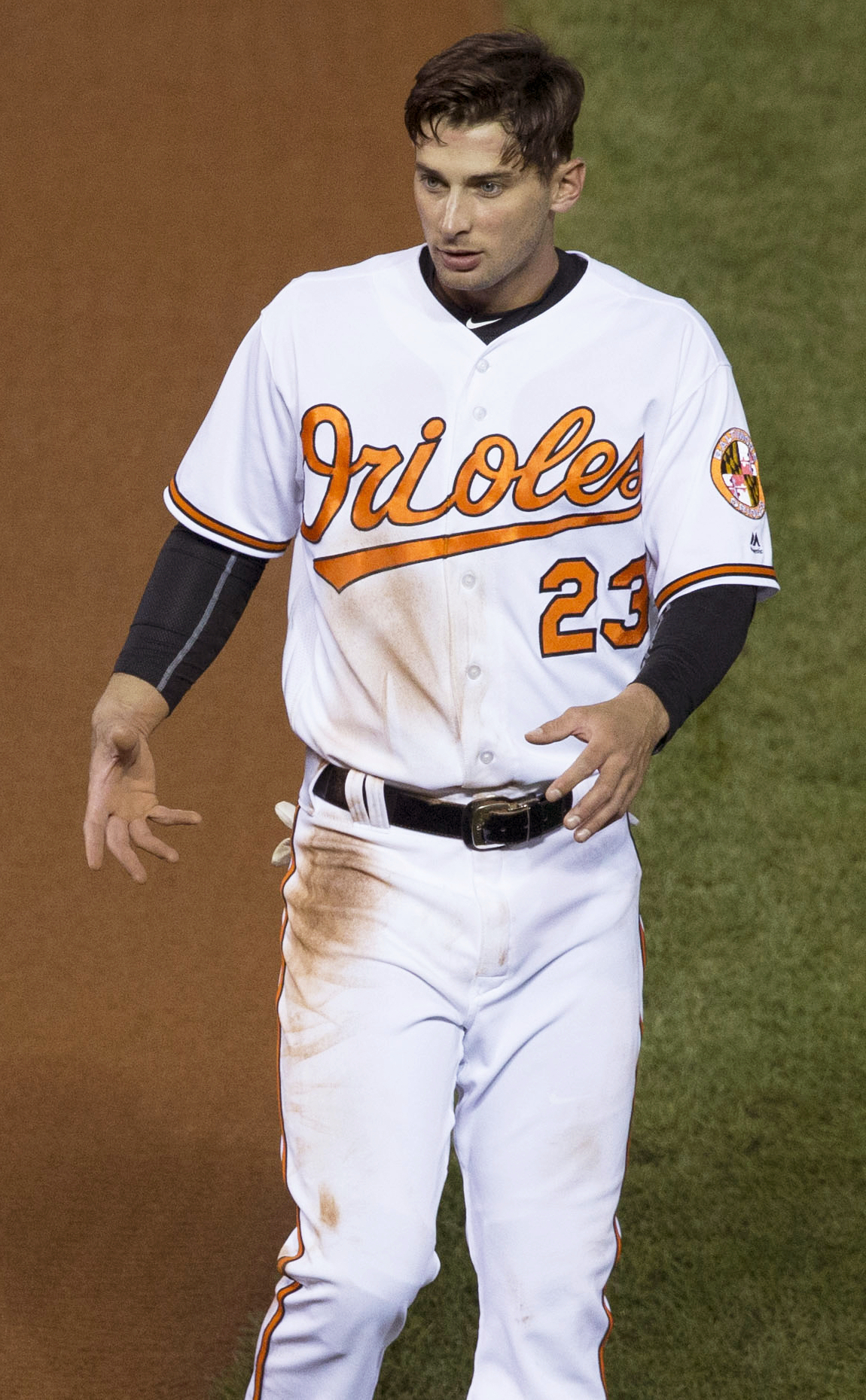
- Rickard with the Baltimore Orioles
- Outfielder
- Born: May 21, 1991 (age 35); Redding, California, U.S.
- Batted: Right Threw: Left

MLB debut
- April 4, 2016, for the Baltimore Orioles

Last MLB appearance
- August 30, 2020, for the San Francisco Giants

MLB statistics
- Batting average: .246
- Home runs: 20
- Runs batted in: 71
- Stats at Baseball Reference

Teams
- Baltimore Orioles (2016–2019); San Francisco Giants (2019–2020)

Joseph Mark Rickard (born May 21, 1991) is an American former professional baseball outfielder. Prior to his professional career, he played college baseball for the Arizona Wildcats of the University of Arizona, and was a member of the 2012 College World Series champions. The Tampa Bay Rays selected Rickard in the ninth round of the 2012 MLB draft. He made his Major League Baseball (MLB) debut in 2016 with the Baltimore Orioles. He has also played in MLB for the San Francisco Giants.

== Amateur career ==
Rickard attended Bishop Gorman High School in Las Vegas, where he played baseball with his brother John, and the University of Arizona. As a junior he batted .489 with 12 home runs, 54 RBIs, and stole 34 bases, and as a senior he batted .554 with 7 home runs, 62 RBIs, and 29 stolen bases. He was named first team All-State as a sophomore, junior, and senior, and a 2009 Louisville Slugger All-American as a senior.

In 2011, he played collegiate summer baseball with the Hyannis Harbor Hawks of the Cape Cod Baseball League, and was named a league all-star.

Playing for the Arizona Wildcats baseball team, Rickard was a member of the 2012 College World Series champions and was named to the All-Tournament Team. In college he batted .325/.391/.443.

== Professional career ==
=== Tampa Bay Rays ===
The Tampa Bay Rays selected Rickard in the ninth round of the 2012 MLB draft, and he signed for a $125,000 signing bonus. He was a 2012 New York-Penn League mid-season All Star for the Hudson Valley Renegades, for whom he batted .279/.371/.372.

In 2013 with the Bowling Green Hot Rods he batted .270/.390/.409 with 79 runs (3rd in the Midwest League), 78 walks (3rd), 16 HBP (2nd), 8 sacrifice flies (3rd), and 30 stolen bases (8th). He spent 2014 with the Montgomery Biscuits of the Double–A Southern League, and batted .243/.337/.296.

Rickard began the 2015 season with the Charlotte Stone Crabs of the High–A Florida State League, and received promotions to the Biscuits and the Durham Bulls of the Triple–A International League, where he played in 29 games and batted .360/.437/.472. With Montgomery, Rickard set a Southern League record by walking six times in a game, and batted .322 (7th in the league)/.420 (2nd)/.479 (10th) with 6 triples (9th) and 19 stolen bases in 23 attempts. He was an MILB.com Tamp Bay Organization All Star.

=== Baltimore Orioles ===
The Baltimore Orioles selected Rickard in the 2015 Rule 5 draft. Rickard made the Orioles' Opening Day roster, and started for the Orioles on Opening Day. He recorded his first major league hit in his first game off of Ervin Santana of the Minnesota Twins. On April 7, he hit his first major league home run, also against the Twins. During his first month in the Majors, Rickard played in every game for the Orioles (23), going 26-for-93 (.280), with five doubles, two home runs, seven RBI, one steal, and 11 runs.

On May 20, Rickard hit his first career lead-off home run to start a game against the Angels. The next batter (Manny Machado) would also hit a homer, giving the Orioles their 8th set of back-to-back homers on the year. On July 20, Rickard was placed on the 15-day disabled list with a thumb ligament injury, ending his season, as he was later placed on the 60-day disabled list. In his rookie season, he played in 85 games, slashing .268/.319/.377 with 13 doubles, five home runs, and 19 RBI. He stole four bases in five attempts and collected 69 hits.

In 2017 in the majors, Rickard batted .241/.276/.345 with four home runs and 19 RBI. On defense, he played 53 games in right field, 43 games in left field, and 21 games in center field. In 16 games in the minor leagues, he batted .211/.338/.281.

Rickard played 79 games (primarily in right field) for the Orioles in 2018, hitting .254/.300/.413 with 8 home runs and 23 RBI.

Rickard started the 2019 season with Orioles, playing 42 games (primarily in right field) of .203/.304/.347 ball with two home runs and six RBI in 118 at–bats before being sent down to the minors on May 24. With the Triple–A Norfolk Tides, he batted .203/.338/.469 with four home runs and 10 RBI in 64 at–bats. Rickard was designated for assignment by the Orioles on June 17, following the promotion of Sean Gilmartin.

=== San Francisco Giants ===
On June 21, 2019, Rickard was claimed off waivers by the San Francisco Giants and assigned to the Triple–A Sacramento River Cats. With Sacramento he batted .372/.431/.587 with 45 runs, 6 home runs, and 23 RBI in 172 at–bats. He was promoted to the Giants roster on August 8. With the Giants in 2019, playing primarily left field he batted .280/.333/.380 with one home run and four RBI in 50 at–bats. He was non-tendered on December 2, 2019, and became a free agent.

On January 5, 2020, the Giants re-signed Rickard to a minor league contract that included an invitation to spring training. He went 0–for–5 in four games for San Francisco in 2020. October 29, Rickard was outrighted off of the 40-man roster. He became a free agent on November 2.

In the minor leagues through 2020, Rickard on defense had played 180 games in center field, 159 games in right field, and 120 games in left field.

=== Acereros de Monclova ===
On June 1, 2021, Rickard signed with the Acereros de Monclova of the Mexican League. Rickard went 0-for-5 with a walk in 2 games before being released on June 6.
