= Tyler Wilson (baseball) =

American baseball player (born 1989)

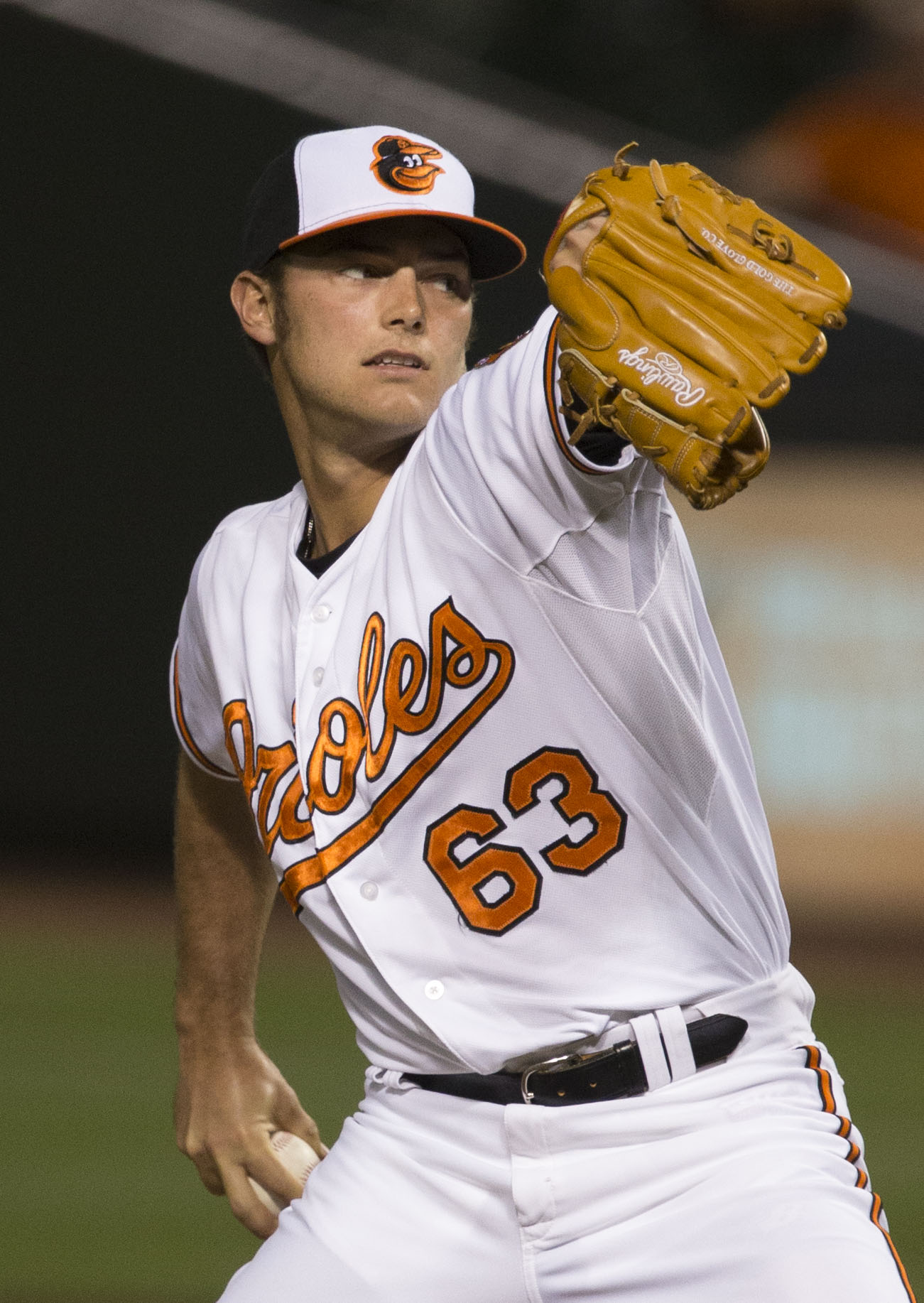
- Wilson with the Baltimore Orioles
- Pitcher
- Born: September 25, 1989 (age 37); Lynchburg, Virginia, U.S.
- Batted: Right Threw: Right

Professional debut
- MLB: May 20, 2015, for the Baltimore Orioles
- KBO: March 24, 2018, for the LG Twins

Last appearance
- MLB: July 4, 2017, for the Baltimore Orioles
- KBO: October 4, 2020, for the LG Twins

MLB statistics
- Win–loss record: 8–10
- Earned run average: 5.02
- Strikeouts: 77

KBO statistics
- Win–loss record: 33–19
- Earned run average: 3.40
- Strikeouts: 395
- Stats at Baseball Reference

Teams
- Baltimore Orioles (2015–2017); LG Twins (2018–2020)

Philip Tyler Wilson (born September 25, 1989) is an American professional baseball pitcher. He previously played in Major League Baseball (MLB) for the Baltimore Orioles and in the KBO League for the LG Twins.

== Career ==
=== Amateur ===
Wilson played college baseball at the University of Virginia for the Virginia Cavaliers from 2009 to 2011. In 2009 and 2010, he played collegiate summer baseball with the Hyannis Harbor Hawks of the Cape Cod Baseball League. He was drafted by the Cincinnati Reds in the 35th round of the 2010 Major League Baseball draft after his junior season but did not sign and returned to Virginia. As a senior, he was the winner of the Senior CLASS Award, given to the most outstanding senior student-athlete in NCAA Division I baseball. After his senior season, Wilson was drafted by the Baltimore Orioles in the 10th round of the 2011 Draft and signed.

=== Baltimore Orioles ===
Wilson made his professional debut with the Gulf Coast Orioles and also pitched that season for the Aberdeen IronBirds. Wilson started 2014 with the Double-A Bowie Baysox and was promoted to the Norfolk Tides during the season. He finished the season 14–8 with a 3.67 earned run average (ERA) and 157 strikeouts. After the season, he was named the Jim Palmer Pitcher of the Year, given to the Orioles top minor league pitcher that season.

Wilson made his major-league debut in Baltimore on May 20, 2015. In his debut, he pitched out of the bullpen, going one inning, giving up two hits and not allowing a run. Wilson made his first career start for the Orioles on May 28 against the Chicago White Sox in game two of a double header. He earned a tough loss after going six innings, while only allowing two runs. On August third, Wilson was recalled by the Orioles to start against the Oakland Athletics. Wilson pitched 7.2 innings, allowing only two runs while striking out three batters. He earned his second career win. He finished the season making nine appearances (five starts), pitching to a 2-2 record and 3.50 ERA.

In 2016, due to two separate rain delays on Opening Day, Wilson was summoned out of the bullpen after the Orioles starter pitched two perfect innings. Wilson threw 3 scoreless innings, while allowing two hits and striking out one batter. The Orioles went on to win the game 3-2. He was designated for assignment on September 1, 2017. He elected free agency following the season on November 6.

=== LG Twins ===
Wilson signed with the LG Twins of the Korea Baseball Organization for the 2018 season, to a reported $800,000 contract. He signed a renewed contract to a reported $1,500,000 contract for the 2019 season. He re-signed for the 2020 season on a $1.6 million contract. Wilson became a free agent after the 2020 season, with the Twins opting to not re-sign him due to perceived issues with his pitching elbow.

== Personal life ==
He is married to ESPN basketball announcer Chelsea Wilson (née Shine).
