= Jayson Aquino =

Dominican baseball player (born 1992)

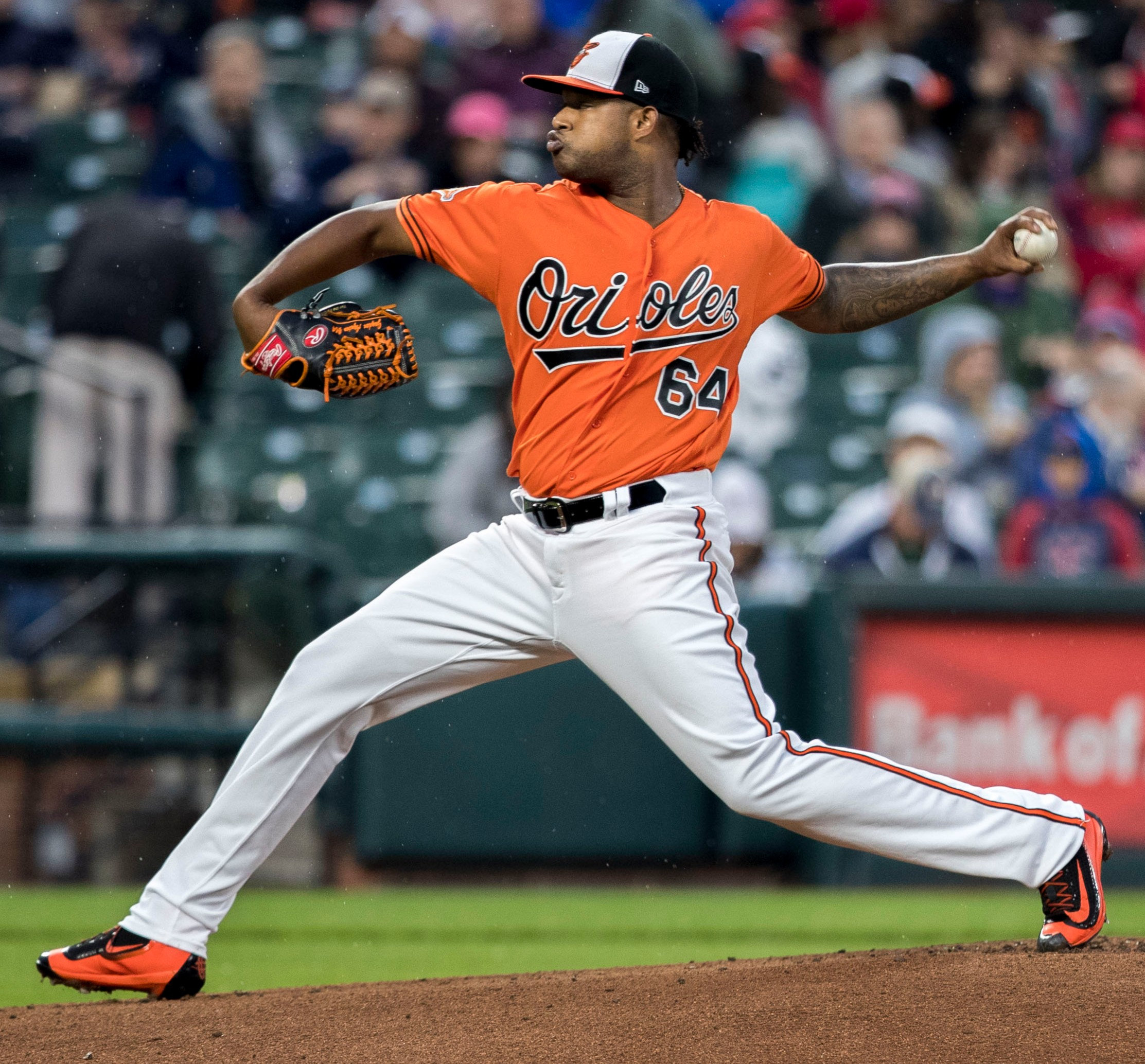
- Aquino with the Baltimore Orioles
- Pitcher
- Born: November 22, 1992 (age 33); San Pedro de Macorís, Dominican Republic
- Batted: Left Threw: Left

MLB debut
- July 4, 2016, for the Baltimore Orioles

Last MLB appearance
- July 5, 2017, for the Baltimore Orioles

MLB statistics
- Win–loss record: 1–2
- Earned run average: 6.32
- Strikeouts: 16
- Stats at Baseball Reference

Teams
- Baltimore Orioles (2016–2017)

Jayson Julio Aquino Félix (born November 22, 1992) is a Dominican former professional baseball pitcher. He played in Major League Baseball (MLB) for the Baltimore Orioles.

== Career ==
=== Colorado Rockies ===
Aquino signed with the Colorado Rockies as an international free agent on July 2, 2009. He spent his first professional season with the Dominican Summer League Rockies in 2010, posting a 4–3 win–loss record, a 1.02 earned run average (ERA), and 59 strikeouts in 61 2/3 innings pitched. He also played the 2011 season with the DSL Rockies, and pitched to an 8–2 record, 1.30 ERA, and 80 strikeouts in 89 2/3 innings. In 2012, Aquino pitched for both the DSL Rockies and the Rookie Grand Junction Rockies, posting a combined record of 10–1, a 1.66 ERA, and 110 strikeouts in 108 1/3 innings.

In 2013, Aquino was promoted to the Low-A Tri-City Dust Devils, and later the Single-A Asheville Tourists. In 14 starts comprising 87 innings, he would go 0–10 with a 4.34 ERA and 73 strikeouts.

Aquino was added to the Rockies' 40-man roster on November 20, 2013, in order to be protected from the Rule 5 draft. In 2014, he played with the High-A Modesto Nuts and Double-A Tulsa Drillers, posting a combined 5–10 record, a 5.13 ERA, and 83 strikeouts in 107 innings pitched. Aquino was designated for assignment by the Rockies on January 30, 2015.

=== Toronto Blue Jays ===
On February 4, 2015, Aquino was traded to the Toronto Blue Jays in exchange for Tyler Ybarra. On March 8, 2015, the Blue Jays optioned Aquino to the Double-A New Hampshire Fisher Cats. He made 5 starts for the High-A Dunedin Blue Jays, posting a 2–2 record and 2.81 ERA with 16 strikeouts across 25 2/3 innings pitched. Aquino was designated for assignment by Toronto following the promotion of Chris Colabello on May 5.

=== Pittsburgh Pirates ===
On May 10, 2015, Aquino was traded to the Pittsburgh Pirates in exchange for cash considerations. In 13 starts for the High-A Bradenton Marauders, he logged a 2–6 record and 3.78 ERA with 50 strikeouts across 78 2/3 innings pitched. The Pirates designated Aquino for assignment on July 22.

=== Cleveland Indians ===
The Pirates traded Aquino to the Cleveland Indians in exchange for cash on July 29, 2015. He spent the remainder of the year with the High-A Lynchburg Hillcats, registering a 1–3 record and 2.45 ERA with 20 strikeouts over 33 innings of work. The Indians designated Aquino for assignment on December 7.

=== Baltimore Orioles ===
On December 9, 2015, Aquino was claimed off waivers by the St. Louis Cardinals.

On April 7, 2016, Aquino was traded by the Cardinals to the Baltimore Orioles in exchange for cash. He pitched for the Bowie Baysox of the Double-A Eastern League before he was promoted to the major leagues for the first time on July 4. Aquino made 3 scoreless appearances for Baltimore during his rookie campaign, logging 3 strikeouts over 2 1/3 innings.

Aquino made his first career start in the majors on April 22, 2017, for the Baltimore Orioles against the Boston Red Sox at Oriole Park at Camden Yards. He went six innings, giving up just two runs on six hits and three walks, while striking out two batters. Aquino earned the victory in a 4-2 Orioles win, the first of his MLB career. In 4 games (2 starts) for Baltimore, he struggled to a 1–2 record and 7.43 ERA with 14 strikeouts across 13 1/3 innings pitched. Aquino was designated for assignment following the promotion of Austin Hays on September 5. He cleared waivers and was sent outright to the Triple-A Norfolk Tides on September 10. Aquino elected free agency following the season on November 6.

On December 22, 2017, Aquino re–signed with the Orioles on a new minor league contract. In 12 starts split between Bowie and Norfolk, he accumulated a combined 4–6 record and 5.15 ERA with 40 strikeouts across 57 2/3 innings pitched. Aquino was released by the Orioles organization on June 19, 2018.

=== Kansas City T-Bones ===
On July 19, 2018, Aquino signed with the Kansas City T-Bones of the American Association of Independent Professional Baseball. In 4 games (3 starts) for the T-Bones, he struggled to an 0–1 record and 6.00 ERA with 5 strikeouts over 15 innings of work. Aquino was released by Kansas City on August 8.

=== New Jersey Jackals ===
On December 27, 2019, Aquino signed with the New Jersey Jackals of the Frontier League for the 2020 season. However, Aquino did not play in a game due to the cancellation of the Frontier League season because of the COVID-19 pandemic.

=== Barrie Baycats ===
On November 23, 2020, Aquino signed with the Barrie Baycats of the Intercounty Baseball League. However, he did not appear for the team in 2021. In 2022, Aquino made two starts for Barrie, compiling a 3.00 ERA with 10 strikeouts across 9 innings pitched.
