= 2006 Oregon State Beavers baseball team =

American college baseball season

2006 Oregon State Beavers baseball

College World Series champions Pac-10 Conference champions
- Conference: Pac-10 Conference
- Record: 50–16 (16–7 Pac-10)
- Head coach: Pat Casey (12th season)
- Assistant coach: Marty Lees (3rd season)
- Pitching coach: Dan Spencer (10th season)
- Home stadium: Goss Stadium

2006 Pacific-10 Conference baseball standings
	Conf.				Overall
Team	W		L	PCT	W		L	PCT
No. 1 Oregon State ‍†‍‍^{y}	16	–	7	.696	50	–	16	.758
Arizona State ‍‍‍^{y}	14	–	10	.583	37	–	21	.638
UCLA ‍‍‍^{y}	13	–	10	.565	33	–	25	.569
Arizona ‍‍‍	12	–	12	.500	27	–	28	.491
No. 15 Stanford ‍‍‍^{y}	11	–	13	.458	33	–	27	.550
Southern California ‍‍‍	11	–	13	.458	36	–	25	.590
Washington ‍‍‍	11	–	13	.458	36	–	25	.590
Washington State ‍‍‍	10	–	14	.417	36	–	23	.610
California ‍‍‍	9	–	15	.375	26	–	28	.481
† – Conference champion y – Invited to the NCAA tournament As of June 30, 2006; Rankings from Collegiate Baseball

The 2006 Oregon State Beavers baseball team represented Oregon State University in the 2006 NCAA Division I baseball season. The Beavers played their home games at Goss Stadium. The team was coached by Pat Casey in his 12th season at Oregon State.

The Beavers won the College World Series, defeating the North Carolina Tar Heels in the championship series.

== Roster ==
2006 Oregon State Beavers baseball team
Players
Coaches

#	Pos.	Name	B/T	Height	Weight	Year	Home town
1	C	Casey Priseman	R/R	6 ft 1 in (1.85 m)	195 lb (88 kg)	So	Woodinville, Washington
2	RHP	Dallas Buck	R/R	6 ft 3 in (1.91 m)	210 lb (95 kg)	Jr	Newberg, Oregon
3	INF	Chris Kunda	R/R	6 ft 0 in (1.83 m)	175 lb (79 kg)	Sr	Philomath, Oregon
4	RHP	Greg Keim	R/R	5 ft 11 in (1.8 m)	175 lb (79 kg)	Jr	Ontario, Oregon
6	LHP	Kevin Gunderson	R/L	5 ft 10 in (1.78 m)	165 lb (75 kg)	Jr	Portland, Oregon
8	OF	Mike Lissman	R/R	6 ft 0 in (1.83 m)	200 lb (91 kg)	Jr	Ontario, Oregon
9	OF	Cole Gillespie	R/R	6 ft 1 in (1.85 m)	200 lb (91 kg)	Jr	West Linn, Oregon
10	INF	Darwin Barney	R/R	5 ft 10 in (1.78 m)	175 lb (79 kg)	So	Beaverton, Oregon
11	C	Mitch Canham	L/R	6 ft 2 in (1.88 m)	212 lb (96 kg)	So	Lake Stevens, Washington
12	C	Erik Ammon	R/R	5 ft 11 in (1.8 m)	195 lb (88 kg)	So	Salem, Oregon
14	INF	Ryan Gipson	R/R	5 ft 11 in (1.8 m)	182 lb (83 kg)	Sr	Central Point, Oregon
15	INF	Lonnie Lechelt	R/R	6 ft 0 in (1.83 m)	193 lb (88 kg)	So	Kennewick, Washington
16	OF	Cory Ellis	R/R	5 ft 7 in (1.7 m)	160 lb (73 kg)	Fr	Portland, Oregon
17	LHP	Anton Maxwell	L/L	5 ft 9 in (1.75 m)	180 lb (82 kg)	Jr	Anchorage, Alaska
18	RHP	Mark Grbavac	R/R	6 ft 0 in (1.83 m)	180 lb (82 kg)	Fr	Portland, Oregon
19	OF	Jake McCormick	R/R	6 ft 3 in (1.91 m)	225 lb (102 kg)	Jr	Marysville, California
20	OF	Greg Laybourn	R/R	5 ft 10 in (1.78 m)	190 lb (86 kg)	Fr	Portland, Oregon
21	OF	Tyler Graham	R/R	6 ft 1 in (1.85 m)	185 lb (84 kg)	Jr	Great Falls, Montana
22	OF	Koa Kahalehoe	L/L	5 ft 10 in (1.78 m)	195 lb (88 kg)	Fr	Las Vegas, Nevada
23	OF	Scott Santschi	L/R	6 ft 0 in (1.83 m)	190 lb (86 kg)	Jr	Vancouver, Washington
24	RHP	Brian Budrow	R/R	6 ft 4 in (1.93 m)	215 lb (98 kg)	Fr	Glendale, Arizona
26	LHP	Joe Paterson	L/L	6 ft 1 in (1.85 m)	195 lb (88 kg)	So	McMinnville, Oregon
27	RHP	Rob Summers	R/R	6 ft 0 in (1.83 m)	188 lb (85 kg)	Fr	Beaverton, Oregon
28	RHP	Daniel Turpen	R/R	6 ft 4 in (1.93 m)	215 lb (98 kg)	So	McMinnville, Oregon
29	INF	Shea McFeely	R/R	6 ft 1 in (1.85 m)	210 lb (95 kg)	Sr	Federal Way, Washington
30	INF	Brett Casey	S/R	6 ft 0 in (1.83 m)	170 lb (77 kg)	Fr	Corvallis, Oregon
31	LHP	Alex Sogard	L/L	6 ft 3 in (1.91 m)	200 lb (91 kg)	Fr	Phoenix, Arizona
32	RHP	Reed Brown	R/R	6 ft 4 in (1.93 m)	210 lb (95 kg)	So	Edmonds, Washington
33	RHP	Michael Stutes	R/R	6 ft 1 in (1.85 m)	185 lb (84 kg)	So	Lake Oswego, Oregon
34	RHP	Jonah Nickerson	R/R	6 ft 1 in (1.85 m)	195 lb (88 kg)	Jr	Oregon City, Oregon
35	OF	John Wallace	L/R	6 ft 0 in (1.83 m)	200 lb (91 kg)	Fr	Reno, Nevada
36	RHP	Jon Koller	R/R	6 ft 6 in (1.98 m)	230 lb (104 kg)	Sr	Carlsbad, California
37	OF	Geoff Wagner	L/L	6 ft 2 in (1.88 m)	215 lb (98 kg)	Sr	Redmond, Oregon
38	INF	Bill Rowe	L/L	6 ft 3 in (1.91 m)	230 lb (104 kg)	Sr	Ashland, Oregon
39	C	Dale Solomon	R/R	5 ft 11 in (1.8 m)	205 lb (93 kg)	Fr	Moreno Valley, California
40	OF	Derek Engelke	L/L	5 ft 10 in (1.78 m)	175 lb (79 kg)	So	Newberg, Oregon
41	INF	Sean Rockey	R/R	6 ft 0 in (1.83 m)	180 lb (82 kg)	Fr	Sammamish, Washington
42	LHP	Bret Bochsler	L/L	6 ft 1 in (1.85 m)	170 lb (77 kg)	Fr	Redmond, Washington
44	P	Eddie Kunz	R/R	6 ft 5 in (1.96 m)	250 lb (113 kg)	So	Portland, Oregon
45	OF	Joey Lakoweske	L/R	6 ft 2 in (1.88 m)	195 lb (88 kg)	Fr	Corvallis, Oregon
46	LHP	Bryn Card	L/L	6 ft 3 in (1.91 m)	175 lb (79 kg)	Fr	Klamath Falls, Oregon

Head coach

Pat Casey

Assistant coach(es)

Marty Lees
David Wong

Pitching coach(es)

Dan Spencer

Legend

- (C) Team captain
- (S) Suspended
- (I) Ineligible
- Injured
- Current redshirt

== Schedule ==
2006 Oregon State Beavers baseball game log (50–16)
Regular season (39–14)
February (6–4)

#	Date	Opponent	Rank	Site/stadium	Score	Overall record	Pac-10 record
Coca-Cola Classic
1	February 10	vs. Nevada	No. 2	Surprise Stadium • Surprise, Arizona	W 12–4	1–0	–
2	February 11	vs. No. 10 Arizona State	No. 2	Surprise Stadium • Surprise, Arizona	W 11–0	2–0	–
3	February 12	vs. Gonzaga	No. 2	Surprise Stadium • Surprise, Arizona	L 5–6	2–1	–
4	February 17	at No. 14 Pepperdine	No. 2	Eddy D. Field Stadium • Malibu, California	W 7–6	3–1	–
5	February 18	at No. 14 Pepperdine	No. 2	Eddy D. Field Stadium • Malibu, California	L 2–6	3–2	–
6	February 19	at No. 14 Pepperdine	No. 2	Eddy D. Field Stadium • Malibu, California	L 1–7	3–3	–
River City Classic
7	February 23	vs. BYU	No. 10	Dobbins Baseball Complex • Davis, California	W 12–2	4–3	–
8	February 24	at UC Davis	No. 10	Dobbins Baseball Complex • Davis, California	L 1–2	4–4	–
9	February 25	at Sacramento State	No. 10	John Smith Field • Sacramento, California	W 8–3	5–4	–
10	February 26	vs. Saint Mary's	No. 10	Dobbins Baseball Complex • Davis, California	W 7–5	6–4	–

March (11–4)

#	Date	Opponent	Rank	Site/stadium	Score	Overall record	Pac-10 record
11	March 3	Nevada	No. 14	Goss Stadium at Coleman Field • Corvallis, Oregon	W 13–4	7–4	–
12	March 4	Nevada	No. 14	Goss Stadium at Coleman Field • Corvallis, Oregon	W 4–0	8–4	–
13	March 5	Nevada	No. 14	Goss Stadium at Coleman Field • Corvallis, Oregon	W 9–1	9–4	–
14	March 7	Portland	No. 12	Goss Stadium at Coleman Field • Corvallis, Oregon	W 3–1	10–4	–
15	March 10	at New Mexico	No. 12	Isotopes Park • Albuquerque, New Mexico	W 10–4	11–4	–
16	March 11	at New Mexico	No. 12	Isotopes Park • Albuquerque, New Mexico	L 2–13	11–5	–
17	March 17	at Southern California	No. 14	Dedeaux Field • Los Angeles, California	W 4–1	12–5	1–0
18	March 18	at Southern California	No. 14	Dedeaux Field • Los Angeles, California	L 3–11	12–6	1–1
19	March 19	at Southern California	No. 14	Dedeaux Field • Los Angeles, California	L 1–4	12–7	1–2
20	March 24	Utah Valley State	No. 19	Goss Stadium at Coleman Field • Corvallis, Oregon	W 7–5	13–7	–
21	March 25	Utah Valley State	No. 19	Goss Stadium at Coleman Field • Corvallis, Oregon	W 9–4	14–7	–
22	March 26	Utah Valley State	No. 19	Goss Stadium at Coleman Field • Corvallis, Oregon	W 13–6	15–7	–
23	March 28	at Pacific	No. 18	Klein Family Field • Stockton, California	W 6–4	16–7	–
24	March 29	vs. San Francisco	No. 18	Klein Family Field • Stockton, California	L 2–8	16–8	–
25	March 31	Texas–Pan American	No. 18	Goss Stadium at Coleman Field • Corvallis, Oregon	W 5–4 (10)	17–8	–

April (15–2)

#	Date	Opponent	Rank	Site/stadium	Score	Overall record	Pac-10 record
26	April 1	Texas–Pan American	No. 18	Goss Stadium at Coleman Field • Corvallis, Oregon	W 9–1	18–8	–
27	April 1	Texas–Pan American	No. 18	Goss Stadium at Coleman Field • Corvallis, Oregon	W 14–1	19–8	–
28	April 7	Arizona	No. 16	Goss Stadium at Coleman Field • Corvallis, Oregon	W 10–5	20–8	2–2
29	April 8	Arizona	No. 16	Goss Stadium at Coleman Field • Corvallis, Oregon	W 10–2	21–8	3–2
30	April 9	Arizona	No. 16	Goss Stadium at Coleman Field • Corvallis, Oregon	L 1–8	21–9	3–3
31	April 11	at Portland	No. 19	Joe Etzel Field • Portland, Oregon	W 14–9	22–9	–
32	April 13	Stanford	No. 19	Goss Stadium at Coleman Field • Corvallis, Oregon	W 3–0	23–9	4–3
33	April 14	Stanford	No. 19	Goss Stadium at Coleman Field • Corvallis, Oregon	W 1–0	24–9	5–3
34	April 16	Stanford	No. 19	Goss Stadium at Coleman Field • Corvallis, Oregon	W 12–1	25–9	6–3
35	April 21	at California	No. 14	Evans Diamond • Berkeley, California	W 5–2	26–9	7–3
36	April 22	at California	No. 14	Evans Diamond • Berkeley, California	W 5–2	27–9	8–3
37	April 23	at California	No. 14	Evans Diamond • Berkeley, California	W 9–7	28–9	9–3
38	April 25	Portland	No. 7	Goss Stadium at Coleman Field • Corvallis, Oregon	L 13–20 (12)	28–10	–
39	April 27	Cal Poly	No. 7	Goss Stadium at Coleman Field • Corvallis, Oregon	W 3–0	29–10	–
40	April 28	New Mexico	No. 7	Goss Stadium at Coleman Field • Corvallis, Oregon	W 16–1	30–10	–
41	April 29	Cal Poly	No. 7	Goss Stadium at Coleman Field • Corvallis, Oregon	W 8–4	31–10	–
42	April 30	New Mexico	No. 7	Goss Stadium at Coleman Field • Corvallis, Oregon	W 8–2	32–10	–

May (7–4)

#	Date	Opponent	Rank	Site/stadium	Score	Overall record	Pac-10 record
43	May 5	No. 22 Washington	No. 6	Goss Stadium at Coleman Field • Corvallis, Oregon	L 4–6	32–11	9–4
44	May 6	No. 22 Washington	No. 6	Goss Stadium at Coleman Field • Corvallis, Oregon	W 5–3	33–11	10–4
45	May 7	No. 22 Washington	No. 6	Goss Stadium at Coleman Field • Corvallis, Oregon	W 7–1	34–11	11–4
46	May 12	at No. 20 Arizona State	No. 5	Packard Stadium • Tempe, Arizona	L 3–10	34–12	11–5
47	May 13	at No. 20 Arizona State	No. 5	Packard Stadium • Tempe, Arizona	L 3–6	34–13	11–6
48	May 14	at No. 20 Arizona State	No. 5	Packard Stadium • Tempe, Arizona	W 9–8	35–13	12–6
49	May 19	at Washington State	No. 7	Bailey–Brayton Field • Pullman, Washington	W 16–1	36–13	13–6
50	May 20	at Washington State	No. 7	Bailey–Brayton Field • Pullman, Washington	W 10–2	37–13	14–6
51	May 21	at Washington State	No. 7	Bailey–Brayton Field • Pullman, Washington	W 13–3	38–13	15–6
52	May 26	UCLA	No. 5	Goss Stadium at Coleman Field • Corvallis, Oregon	W 9–2	39–13	16–6
53	May 28	UCLA	No. 5	Goss Stadium at Coleman Field • Corvallis, Oregon	L 1–3	39–14	16–7

Postseason (11–2)
NCAA tournament: Corvallis Regional (3–0)

#	Date	Opponent	Seed/Rank	Site/stadium	Score	Overall record	NCAAT record
54	June 2	(4) Wright State	(1) No. 4	Goss Stadium at Coleman Field • Corvallis, Oregon	W 5–3	40–14	1–0
55	June 3	(2) No. 28 Kansas	(1) No. 4	Goss Stadium at Coleman Field • Corvallis, Oregon	W 11–3	41–14	2–0
56	June 4	(3) Hawaii	(1) No. 4	Goss Stadium at Coleman Field • Corvallis, Oregon	W 12–3	42–14	3–0

NCAA tournament: Corvallis Super Regional (2–0)

#	Date	Opponent	Seed/Rank	Site/stadium	Score	Overall record	NCAAT record
57	June 10	No. 15 Stanford	No. 4	Goss Stadium at Coleman Field • Corvallis, Oregon	W 4–3	43–14	4–0
58	June 11	No. 15 Stanford	No. 4	Goss Stadium at Coleman Field • Corvallis, Oregon	W 15–0	44–14	5–0

NCAA tournament: College World Series (6–2)

#	Date	Opponent	Seed/Rank	Site/stadium	Score	Overall record	CWS record
59	June 18	vs. No. 8 Miami (FL)	No. 4	Rosenblatt Stadium • Omaha, Nebraska	L 1–11	44–15	0–1
60	June 19	vs. (7) No. 6 Georgia	No. 4	Rosenblatt Stadium • Omaha, Nebraska	W 5–3	45–15	1–1
61	June 20	vs. No. 8 Miami (FL)	No. 4	Rosenblatt Stadium • Omaha, Nebraska	W 8–1	46–15	2–1
62	June 21	vs. (2) No. 1 Rice	No. 4	Rosenblatt Stadium • Omaha, Nebraska	W 5–0	47–15	3–1
63	June 22	vs. (2) No. 1 Rice	No. 4	Rosenblatt Stadium • Omaha, Nebraska	W 2–0	48–15	4–1
64	June 24	vs. No. 5 North Carolina	No. 4	Rosenblatt Stadium • Omaha, Nebraska	L 3–4	48–16	4–2
65	June 25	vs. No. 5 North Carolina	No. 4	Rosenblatt Stadium • Omaha, Nebraska	W 11–7	49–16	5–2
66	June 26	vs. No. 5 North Carolina	No. 4	Rosenblatt Stadium • Omaha, Nebraska	W 3–2	50–16	6–2

== Awards and honors ==
Darwin Barney
All-Pac-10
Dallas Buck
All America Second Team
All-Pac-10
Kevin Gunderson
College World Series All-Tournament Team
All America Second Team
All-Pac-10
Cole Gillespie
College World Series All-Tournament Team
All America First Team
All-Pac-10
Shea McFeely
College World Series All-Tournament Team
Jonah Nickerson
College World Series Most Outstanding Player
All America Second Team
All-Pac-10
Bill Rowe
College World Series All-Tournament Team

== 2006 Major League Baseball draft ==
The following members of the Oregon State Beavers baseball program were drafted in the 2006 Major League Baseball draft.

Members of baseball program drafted in 2006
Player	Position	Round	Overall	MLB Team
Dallas Buck	RHP	3rd	86th	Arizona Diamondbacks
Cole Gillespie	OF	3rd	92nd	Milwaukee Brewers
Kevin Gunderson	LHP	5th	160th	Atlanta Braves
Jonah Nickerson	RHP	7th	202nd	Detroit Tigers
Tyler Graham	OF	19th	566th	San Francisco Giants
Chris Kunda	2B	19th	584th	New York Yankees
Shea McFeely	3B	28th	837th	Arizona Diamondbacks
Mitch Canham	C	41st	1246th	San Diego Padres
Jon Koller	RHP	48th	1435th	New York Mets
