= 2006 Atlantic Coast Conference baseball tournament =

American college baseball tournament

- Teams: 8
- Format: Double-elimination tournament
- Finals site: Baseball Grounds of Jacksonville; Jacksonville, FL
- Champions: Clemson Tigers (9th title)
- Winning coach: Jack Leggett (2nd title)
- MVP: Tyler Colvin (Clemson Tigers)

2006 Atlantic Coast Conference baseball standings
	Conf.				Overall
Team	W		L	PCT	W		L	PCT
Atlantic
No. 5 Clemson ^{x}‍‍‡‍^{y}	24	–	6	.800	53	–	16	.768
No. 24 Florida State ‍‍‍^{y}	16	–	13	.552	44	–	21	.677
No. 29 NC State ‍‍‍^{y}	16	–	13	.552	40	–	23	.635
Wake Forest ‍‍‍	16	–	13	.552	33	–	22	.600
Boston College ‍‍‍	9	–	21	.300	28	–	25	.528
Maryland ‍‍‍	8	–	22	.267	26	–	30	.464
Coastal
No. 2 North Carolina ^{x}‍‍‍^{y}	22	–	8	.733	54	–	15	.783
No. 20 Virginia ‍‍‍^{y}	21	–	9	.700	47	–	15	.758
No. 8 Georgia Tech ‍‍‍^{y}	19	–	11	.633	50	–	18	.735
No. 6 Miami (FL) ‍‍‍^{y}	17	–	13	.567	42	–	24	.636
Duke ‍‍‍	6	–	24	.200	15	–	40	.273
Virginia Tech ‍‍‍	4	–	25	.138	20	–	33	.377
x – Division champion ‡ – Tournament champion y – Invited to the NCAA tournament As of June 30, 2006; Rankings from Collegiate Baseball

The 2006 Atlantic Coast Conference baseball tournament was held at the Baseball Grounds of Jacksonville in Jacksonville, Florida, from May 24 through 28. Clemson won the tournament and earned the Atlantic Coast Conference's automatic bid to the 2006 NCAA Division I baseball tournament. This was the last edition of the tournament to use the double-elimination format. The ACC converted the tournament to a round robin format in 2007.

== Seeding Procedure ==
From TheACC.com:

The top two teams from both the Atlantic and Coastal divisions, as determined by conference winning percentage, in addition to the four teams with the next best conference winning percentage, regardless of division, will be selected to participate in the ACC Baseball Championship. The two division champions will automatically be seeded number one and two based on winning percentage in overall conference competition. The remaining teams will be seeded (three through eight) based on winning percentage in overall conference competition without regard to division. All ties will be broken using the tie-breaking provisions.

- Boston College, Duke, Maryland and Virginia Tech did not make the tournament.

== Tournament ==
First round
1	Clemson	13
8	Wake Forest	1
4	Georgia Tech	2
5	Miami (FL)	1
8	Wake Forest	1
5	Miami (FL)	4
2	North Carolina	3
7	North Carolina State	9
3	Virginia	6
6	Florida State	2
2	North Carolina	6
6	Florida State	7

Second round
1	Clemson	3
4	Georgia Tech	2
5	Miami (FL)	4
4	Georgia Tech	7
7	North Carolina State	4
3	Virginia	3
6	Florida State	11
3	Virginia	0

Semifinals
1	Clemson	7	16
4	Georgia Tech	8	11
7	North Carolina State	3	8
6	Florida State	7	7

Finals
1	Clemson	8
7	North Carolina State	4

== All-Tournament Team ==
Position	Player	School
1B	Luke Murton	Georgia Tech
2B	Taylor Harbin	Clemson
3B	Marquez Smith	Clemson
SS	Buster Posey	Florida State
C	Danny Diaz	Florida State
C	Caleb Mangum	NC State
OF	Brad Chalk	Clemson
OF	Tyler Colvin	Clemson
OF	P.J. Mitchell	Clemson
OF	Matt Camp	NC State
DH	Travis Anderson	Florida State
P	Sean Clark	Clemson
MVP	Tyler Colvin	Clemson

== See also ==
- College World Series
- NCAA Division I Baseball Championship
