= 2006 NCAA Division I baseball rankings =

- Duration: January 26 – June 26, 2006
- Number of teams: 293
- Preseason No. 1: Texas

Tournament
- Duration: June 2–26, 2006
- Most conference bids: SEC (8)

College World Series
- Duration: June 16–26, 2006
- Champions: Oregon State (1st title)
- Runners-up: North Carolina
- MOP: Jonah Nickerson

Seasons
- ← 2005 2007 →

The following polls make up the 2006 NCAA Division I baseball rankings. USA Today and ESPN began publishing the Coaches' Poll of 31 active coaches ranking the top 25 teams in the nation in 1992. Each coach is a member of the American Baseball Coaches Association. Baseball America began publishing its poll of the top 20 teams in college baseball in 1981. Beginning with the 1985 season, it expanded to the top 25. Collegiate Baseball Newspaper published its first human poll of the top 20 teams in college baseball in 1957, and expanded to rank the top 30 teams in 1961.

== Legend ==
	Increase in ranking
	Decrease in ranking
	Not ranked previous week
Italics	Number of first place votes
(#–#)	Win–loss record
т	Tied with team above or below also with this symbol

== USA Today/ESPN Coaches' Poll ==
Currently, only the final poll from the 2006 season is available.

Rank	Team
1	Oregon State
2	North Carolina
3	Rice
4	Cal State Fullerton
5	Clemson
6	Miami (FL)
7	Georgia Tech
8	Georgia
9	Alabama
10	Ole Miss
11	Oklahoma
12	Texas
13	College of Charleston
14	Virginia
15	Kentucky
16	Stanford
17	South Carolina
18	Nebraska
19	Oral Roberts
20	Florida State
21	Missouri
22	Arkansas
23	Arizona State
24	Houston
25	Pepperdine

== Baseball America ==
	Preseason	Week 1 Feb 6	Week 2 Feb 13	Week 3 Feb 20	Week 4 Feb 27	Week 5 Mar 6	Week 6 Mar 13	Week 7 Mar 20	Week 8 Mar 27	Week 9 Apr 3	Week 10 Apr 10	Week 11 Apr 17	Week 12 Apr 24	Week 13 May 1	Week 14 May 8	Week 15 May 15	Week 16 May 22	Week 17 May 29	Week 18 June 6	Week 19 June 13	Week 20 June 29	
1.	Texas	Clemson (0–0)	Clemson (0–0)	Clemson (3–0)	Clemson (5–1)	Georgia Tech (13–0)	Georgia Tech (16–1)	Mississippi State (15–0)	Mississippi State (19–1)	Cal State Fullerton (24–7)	Cal State Fullerton (26–8)	Cal State Fullerton (28–9)	Cal State Fullerton (31–10)	Rice (39–9)	Rice (39–9)	Rice (42–10)	Rice (46–10)	Rice (50–10)	Rice (53–10)	Rice (55–11)	Oregon State (50–16)	1.
2.	Clemson	Florida (0–0)	Florida (3–0)	Florida (6–1)	Georgia Tech (10–0)	Clemson (7–2)	Clemson (10–3)	Rice (18–6)	Cal State Fullerton (20–7)	South Carolina (26–3)	Rice (28–8)	Rice (32–8)	Rice (35–9)	North Carolina (39–8)	North Carolina (39–8)	Cal State Fullerton (36–12)	Cal State Fullerton (39–13)	Cal State Fullerton (43–13)	Cal State Fullerton (46–13)	Cal State Fullerton (48–13)	North Carolina (54–15)	2.
3.	Florida	Georgia Tech (0–0)	Georgia Tech (2–0)	Georgia Tech (6–0)	North Carolina (7–0)	Rice (13–3)	Rice (15–5)	North Carolina (17–3)	Georgia Tech (20–4)	Mississippi State (22–3)	North Carolina (27–7)	North Carolina (31–7)	North Carolina (34–8)	Nebraska (36–6)	Cal State Fullerton (35–12)	Texas (38–15)	Clemson (43–13)	Clemson (47–14)	Clemson (50–14)	Clemson (52–14)	Cal State Fullerton (50–15)	3.
4.	Georgia Tech	North Carolina (0–0)	North Carolina (0–0)	North Carolina (3–0)	Rice (10–2)	North Carolina (10–1)	North Carolina (13–2)	Cal State Fullerton (17–6)	Florida State (25–2)	Rice (24–8)	Florida State (31–4)	Nebraska (28–5)	Nebraska (32–6)	Cal State Fullerton (33–11)	Oregon State (34–11)	Clemson (39–13)	North Carolina (45–11)	Texas (40–19)	Oregon State (42–14)	Oregon State (44–14)	Rice (57–13)	4.
5.	Cal State Fullerton	Rice (1–0)	Rice (4–1)	Rice (6–2)	Florida (8–3)	Tennessee (11–2)	Tennessee (13–2)	Georgia Tech (18–3)	South Carolina (22–3)	North Carolina (23–6)	Clemson (24–8)	Texas (27–12)	Oregon State (28–9)	Oregon State (32–10)	Nebraska (36–8)	North Carolina (41–11)	Oregon State (38–13)	Oregon State (39–14)	Alabama (44–19)	North Carolina (40–13)	Clemson (53–16)	5.
6.	North Carolina	Oregon State (0–0)	Oregon State (2–1)	Tennessee (6–1)	Tennessee (7–2)	Mississippi State (6–0)	Mississippi State (11–0)	Florida State (21–2)	Rice (20–8)	Florida State (27–4)	Nebraska (24–5)	Clemson (27–10)	Alabama (31–12)	Alabama (34–13)	Texas (36–15)	Oregon State (35–13)	Texas (38–18)	Alabama (41–19)	Ole Miss (43–20)	Georgia (47–21)	Georgia (47–23)	6.
7.	Rice	Texas (0–3)	Texas (3–4)	Texas (5–5)	Cal State Fullerton (8–4)	Cal State Fullerton (10–6)	Cal State Fullerton (14–6)	South Carolina (17–3)	North Carolina (20–5)	Clemson (20–7)	South Carolina (27–6)	South Carolina (29–8)	Texas (28–15)	Texas (31–15)	Clemson (33–13)	Kentucky (40–11)	Virginia (45–11)	Ole Miss (40–20)	Georgia (45–20)	Georgia Tech (50–16)	Georgia Tech (50–18)	7.
8.	Oregon State	Tennessee (2–1)	Tennessee (4–1)	Oregon State (3–3)	Mississippi State (3–0)	Florida State (14–1)	Florida State (18–1)	Nebraska (15–2)	Nebraska (17–3)	Nebraska (20–5)	Texas (24–11)	Florida State (33–6)	Georgia Tech (32–9)	Clemson (33–13)	Kentucky (37–11)	Nebraska (37–12)	Alabama (39–17)	Georgia (41–19)	Georgia Tech (48–16)	Miami (FL) (41–22)	Miami (FL) (42–24)	8.
9.	Tennessee	Cal State Fullerton (0–3)	Cal State Fullerton (3–3)	Cal State Fullerton (5–4)	South Carolina (8–1)	South Carolina (9–2)	South Carolina (13–2)	Florida (17–7)	Clemson (16–6)	Texas (21–11)	Alabama (25–10)	Oregon State (25–9)	Clemson (29–13)	Oklahoma (35–11)	Oklahoma (37–13)	Virginia (41–11)	Georgia (38–17)	Nebraska (42–15)	North Carolina (48–13)	Oklahoma (45–22)	Oklahoma (45–22)	9.
10.	Missouri	Missouri (0–0)	Tulane (2–1)	Tulane (6–1)	Florida State (10–1)	Arkansas (13–1)	Arkansas (16–1)	Clemson (11–6)	Texas (19–10)	Georgia Tech (22–6)	Mississippi State (25–6)	Arizona State (27–11)	Oklahoma (32–10)	Notre Dame (35–9)	Arkansas (34–15)	Alabama (36–17)	Kentucky (42–13)	Georgia Tech (45–16)	Oklahoma (44–20)	Alabama (44–21)	Alabama (44–22)	10.
11.	Pepperdine	Pepperdine (2–1)	Mississippi State (0–0)	Mississippi State (0–0)	Arkansas (9–0)	Oregon State (8–4)	LSU (16–3)	Arkansas (17–2)	Tulane (17–9)	Oregon State (19–8)	Oregon State (21–9)	Alabama (27–12)	Arkansas (30–12)	Kentucky (34–11)	Notre Dame (37–11)	Georgia (35–16)	Georgia Tech (42–14)	North Carolina (45–13)	Texas (41–210	Ole Miss (44–22)	Ole Miss (44–22)	11.
12.	Tulane	Tulane (0–0)	Missouri (2–2)	Missouri (4–2)	Pepperdine (8–6)	Tulane (10–4)	Nebraska (11–2)	Tennessee (14–5)	Oregon State (15–7)	Arkansas (23–6)	Arkansas (25–8)	Arkansas (27–10)	Notre Dame (32–8)	South Carolina (32–12)	Alabama (34–16)	Georgia Tech (39–13)	Oklahoma State (39–15)	Virginia (46–13)	College of Charleston (46–15)	Texas (41–21)	Texas (41–21)	12.
13.	Mississippi State	Mississippi State (0–0)	South Carolina (2–1)	South Carolina (5–1)	Oregon State (6–4)	LSU (13–2)	Oregon State (11–5)	Wichita State (20–3)	Arkansas (20–5)	Arizona State (23–9)	Arizona State (25–10)	Georgia Tech (28–9)	Kentucky (30–10)	Virginia (38–10)	Virginia (39–10)	Arizona State (32–17)	Oklahoma (39–17)	Kentucky (42–15)	Miami (FL) (39–21)	South Carolina (48–17)	South Carolina (41–25)	13.
14.	South Carolina	South Carolina (0–0)	Florida State (4–1)	Florida State (7–1)	Texas (9–6)	Nebraska (8–2)	Tulane (12–6)	Tulane (14–8)	Arizona State (21–7)	Alabama (22–9)	Georgia Tech (25––8)	NC State (30–10)	South Carolina (31–11)	Arkansas (31–14)	Houston (34–17)	Oklahoma (37–16)	Arkansas (38–17)	Houston (39–20)	Nebraska (42–17)	College of Charleston (46–17)	College of Charleston (46–17)	14.
15.	Florida State	Florida State (3–0)	San Diego (5–1)	San Diego (7–2)	Tulane (8–3)	Florida (9–6)	Florida (14–6)	LSU (17–5)	Florida (17–11)	Old Dominion (29–3)	Old Dominion (31–4)	Oklahoma (28–10)	Florida State (33–10)	Houston (31–16)	Georgia Tech (36–12)	Arkansas (35–17)	Nebraska (39–14)	Notre Dame (45–15)	South Carolina (40–23)	Nebraska (40–23)	Nebraska (40–23)	15.
16.	Arizona State	Arizona State (5–1)	Pepperdine (3–3)	Pepperdine (6–4)	Long Beach State (9–4)	Stanford (10–5)	Arizona State (17–5)	Oregon State (12–7)	LSU (19–7)	Vanderbilt (19–9)	NC State (27–9)	Vanderbilt (25–12)	Arizona State (28–14)	Georgia Tech (33–12)	Georgia (31–16)	Houston (35–19)	Houston (36–19)	Arizona State (36–19)	Virginia (47–15)	Virginia (47–15)	Virginia (47–15)	16.
17.	Southern California	Long Beach State (3–0)	Arkansas (3–0)	Arkansas (6–0)	LSU (10–1)	Arizona State (14–5)	Stanford (11–7)	Stanford (11–7)	Wichita State (21–5)	NC State (25–8)	Oklahoma (24–10)	Mississippi State (26–9)	College of Charleston (33–8)	Florida State (35–11)	Florida State (37–12)	Oklahoma State (36–14)	Ole Miss (36–20)	Oklahoma (40–19)	Stanford (33–25)	Oral Roberts (41–16)	Oral Roberts (41–16)	17.
18.	Arkansas	San Diego (3–0)	TCU (2–1)	Long Beach State (6–4)	NC State (12–1)	Missouri (8–5)	Texas (13–9)	Texas (15–10)	Oklahoma (20–6)	Tulane (18–12)	Vanderbilt (21–11)	Notre Dame (27–8)	NC State (31–13)	Ole Miss (30–15)	Arizona State (30–16)	Ole Miss (33–19)	Notre Dame (41–14)	Pepperdine (40–19)	Missouri (46–25)	Missouri (36–25)	Missouri (36–25)	18.
19.	TCU	Stanford (3–0)	Long Beach State (4–2)	LSU (6–1)	Stanford (9–4)	Ole Miss (8–3)	Washington (15–5)	Arizona State (18–7)	Pepperdine (18–11)	Oklahoma (21–9)	Kentucky (25–8)	College of Charleston (30–7)	Houston (28–15)	College of Charleston (33–10)	South Carolina (32–16)	Notre Dame (38–13)	Arizona State (33–19)	Fresno State (43–16)	Oral Roberts (41–14)	Stanford (33–27)	Stanford (33–27)	19.
20.	LSU	Arkansas (0–0)	LSU (2–1)	NC State (8–1)	Missouri (5–4)	Texas A&M (13–2)	Georgia (11–2)	NC State (21–4)	Kentucky (20–5)	Wake Forest (23–7)	Southern California (20–14)	Old Dominion (33–6)	Virginia (34–10)	Arizona State (29–16)	Peppedine (33–17)	Pepperdine (36–18)	Pepperdine (38–18)	Oklahoma State (38–19)	Kentucky (43–17)	Kentucky (43–17)	Kentucky (43–17)	20.
21.	Fresno State	TCU (0–0)	NC State (6–0)	TCU (4–3)	TCU (6–4)	Texas (10–8)	Pepperdine (12–10)	Pepperdine (14–11)	Tennessee (17–7)	Creighton (18–6)	College of Charleston (27–6)	Kentucky (26–10)	Vanderbilt (25–16)	Pepperdine (30–16)	College of Charleston (33–11)	College of Charleston (38–12)	Fresno State (39–16)	Arkansas (38–19)	Pepperdine (42–21)	Pepperdine (42–21)	Pepperdine (42–21)	21.
22.	Long Beach State	LSU (0–0)	Cal Poly (7–2)	Cal Poly (9–3)	Ole Miss (6–1)	Long Beach State (10–7)	Baylor (12–4)	Baylor (14–6)	Georgia (17–5)	Pepperdine (20–13)	Creighton (20–8)	Southern California (22–16)	UCLA (23–16)	Washington (30–16)	Ole Miss (31–18)	Miami (FL) (34–17)	Tulane (39–17)	Kansas (42–23)	Fresno State (45–18)	Fresno State (45–18)	Fresno State (45–18)	22.
23.	Ole Miss	Ole Miss (0–0)	Ole Miss (0–0)	Ole Miss (2–0)	Nebraska (5–2)	Pepperdine (9–9)	Wichita State (17–2)	Oklahoma (18–5)	Virginia (22–5)	Kentucky (22–7)	San Diego (21–12)	Winthrop (29–10)	Ole Miss (26–15)	Vanderbilt (27–18)	Miami (FL) (32–16)	Winthrop (41–12)	San Francisco (37–19)	Tulane (41–19)	Oklahoma State (40–21)	Oklahoma State (40–21)	Oklahoma State (40–21)	23.
24.	NC State	NC State (3–0)	Stanford (4–2)	Southern California (7–4)	Winthrop (9–2)	Cal Poly (12–6)	Oklahoma (16–4)	Virginia (19–4)	Winthrop (21–5)	Kansas (18–11)	Baylor (22–11)	Miami (FL) (23–13)	Mississippi State (29–11)	Miami (FL) (29–16)	Oklahoma State (33–13)	Tulane (37–16)	Hawaii (40–13)	College of Charleston (43–15)	Houston (39–22)	Houston (39–22)	Houston (39–22)	24.
25.	California	Cal Poly (5–1)	Southern California (4–3)	Nebraska (3–1)	San Diego (7–6)	Kansas (13–4)	Kansas (15–6)	Georgia (14–5)	Miami (FL) (23–7)	Winthrop (23–7)	Winthrop (26–9)	San Diego (23–14)	Old Dominion (35–8)	Old Dominion (35–8)	Old Dominion (37–9)	Baylor (33–19)	Elon (42–14)	San Francisco (38–21)	Wichita State (46–22)	Wichita State (46–22)	Wichita State (46–22)	25.
	Preseason	Week 1 Feb 6	Week 2 Feb 13	Week 3 Feb 20	Week 4 Feb 27	Week 5 Mar 6	Week 6 Mar 13	Week 7 Mar 20	Week 8 Mar 27	Week 9 Apr 3	Week 10 Apr 10	Week 11 Apr 17	Week 12 Apr 24	Week 13 May 1	Week 14 May 8	Week 15 May 15	Week 16 May 22	Week 17 May 29	Week 18 June 6	Week 19 June 13	Week 20 June 29	
		Dropped: 17 Southern California; 21 Fresno State; 25 California	Dropped: 16 Arizona State	Dropped: 24 Stanford	Dropped: 22 Cal Poly; 24 Southern California	Dropped: 18 NC State; 21 TCU; 24 Winthrop; 25 San Diego	Dropped: 18 Missouri; 19 Ole Miss; 20 Texas A&M; 22 Long Beach State; 24 Cal Poly	Dropped: 19 Washington; 25 Kansas	Dropped: 17 Stanford; 20 NC State; 22 Baylor	Dropped: 15 Florida; 16 LSU; 17 Wichita State; 21 Tennessee; 22 Georgia; 23 Virginia; 25 Miami (FL)	Dropped: 18 Tulane; 20 Wake Forest; 22 Pepperdine; 24 Kansas	Dropped: 22 Creighton; 24 Baylor	Dropped: 22 Southern California; 23 Winthrop; 24 Miami (FL); 25 San Diego	Dropped: 18 NC State; 22 UCLA; 24 Mississippi State	Dropped: 22 Washington; 23 Vanderbilt	Dropped: 17 Florida State; 18 South Carolina; 25 Old Dominion	Dropped: 21 College of Charleston; 22 Miami (FL); 23 Winthrop; 25 Baylor	Dropped: 24 Hawaii; 25 Elon	Dropped: 15 Notre Dame; 16 Arizona State; 21 Arkansas; 22 Kansas; 23 Tulane; 25 San Francisco	None	None	

== Collegiate Baseball ==
	Preseason Dec 23	Week 1 Feb 6	Week 2 Feb 13	Week 3 Feb 20	Week 4 Feb 27	Week 5 Mar 6	Week 6 Mar 13	Week 7 Mar 20	Week 8 Mar 27	Week 9 Apr 3	Week 10 Apr 10	Week 11 Apr 17	Week 12 Apr 24	Week 13 May 1	Week 14 May 8	Week 15 May 15	Week 16 May 22	Week 17 May 29	Week 18 June 6	Week 19 June 12	Week 20 June 27	
1.	Texas	Florida (0–0)	Florida (3–0)	Florida (6–1)	Clemson (5–1)	Georgia Tech (13–0)	Florida State (18–1)	Florida State (21–2)	Florida State (25–2)	South Carolina (26–3)	Cal State Fullerton (26–8)	North Carolina (31–7)	North Carolina (34–8)	North Carolina (39–8)	North Carolina (39–8)	Rice (42–10)	Rice (46–10)	Rice (50–10)	Rice (53–10)	Rice (55–11)	Oregon State (50–16)	1.
2.	Florida	Oregon State (0–0)	Oregon State (2–1)	Clemson (3–0)	Rice (10–2)	Florida State (14–1)	Georgia Tech (16–1)	Nebraska (15–2)	Mississippi State (19–1)	Cal State Fullerton (24–7)	North Carolina (27–7)	Cal State Fullerton (28–9)	Cal State Fullerton (31–10)	Rice (39–9)	Rice (39–9)	Cal State Fullerton (36–12)	Cal State Fullerton (39–13)	Cal State Fullerton (43–13)	Cal State Fullerton (46–13)	Cal State Fullerton (48–13)	North Carolina (54–15)	2.
3.	Oregon State	Nebraska (0–0)	Nebraska (0–0)	Nebraska (3–1)	North Carolina (7–0)	Clemson (7–2)	Nebraska (11–2)	Mississippi State (15–0)	Nebraska (17–3)	North Carolina (23–6)	Florida State (31–4)	Rice (32–8)	Rice (35–9)	Nebraska (36–6)	Cal State Fullerton (35–12)	Texas (38–15)	Clemson (43–13)	Clemson (47–14)	Clemson (50–14)	Clemson (52–14)	Rice (57–13)	3.
4.	Nebraska	Rice (1–0)	Rice (4–1)	Rice (6–2)	Nebraska (5–2)	Rice (13–3)	Clemson (10–3)	Georgia Tech (18–3)	Georgia Tech (20–4)	Florida State (27–4)	Nebraska (24–5)	Nebraska (28–5)	Nebraska (32–6)	Cal State Fullerton (33–11)	Texas (36–15)	Kentucky (40–11)	North Carolina (45–11)	Oregon State (39–14)	Oregon State (42–14)	Oregon State (44–14)	Cal State Fullerton (50–15)	4.
5.	Rice	Clemson (0–0	Clemson (0–0)	North Carolina (3–0)	Georgia Tech (10–0)	North Carolina (10–1)	Rice (15–5)	Rice (18–6)	South Carolina (22–3)	Mississippi State (22–3)	Rice (28–8)	Texas (27–12)	Georgia Tech (32–9)	Alabama (34–130	Oregon State (34–11)	Clemson (39–13)	Oregon State (38–13)	Texas (40–19)	North Carolina (48–13)	North Carolina (50–13)	Clemson (53–16)	5.
6.	Clemson	North Carolina (0–0)	North Carolina (0–0)	Florida State (7–1)	Florida State (10–1)	Nebraska (8–2)	North Carolina (14–2)	North Carolina (17–3)	Cal State Fullerton (20–7)	Nebraska (20–5)	Texas (24–11)	Florida State (33–6)	Alabama (31–12)	Oregon State (32–10)	Nebraska (36–8)	North Carolina (41–11)	Alabama (39–17)	North Carolina (45–13)	Alabama (44–19)	Georgia (47–21)	Miami (FL) (42–24)	6.
7.	North Carolina	FLorida State (3–0)	Florida State (4–1)	Georgia Tech (6–0)	Florida (8–3)	Tennessee (11–2)	Tennessee (13–2)	South Carolina (17–3)	Rice (20–8)	Rice (24–8)	Clemson (24–8)	NC State (30–10)	Oregon State (28–9)	Texas (31–15)	Kentucky (37–11)	Oregon State (35–13)	Kentucky (42–13)	Alabama (41–19)	Georgia (45–20)	Georgia Tech (50–16)	Georgia (47–23)	7.
8.	Florida State	Stanford (3–0)	Georgia Tech (2–0)	San Diego (7–2)	LSU (10–1)	LSU (13–2)	LSU (16–3)	Cal State Fullerton (17–6)	North Carolina (20–5)	Clemson (20–7)	Alabama (25–10)	Georgia Tech (28–9)	Notre Dame (32–8)	Notre Dame (35–9–1)	Alabama (34–16)	Alabama (36–17)	Virginia (45–11)	Kentucky (42–15)	Georgia Tech (48–16)	Miami (FL) (41–22)	Georgia Tech (50–18)	8.
9.	Cal State Fullerton	Georgia Tech (0–0)	San Diego (5–1)	Pepperdine (6–3)	Tennessee (7–2)	South Carolina (9–2)	South Carolina (13–2)	Florida (17–7)	Clemson (16–6)	Texas (21–11)	South Carolina (27–6)	Clemson (27–10)	Texas (28–15)	Clemson (33–13)	Clemson (33–13)	Virginia (41–11)	Texas (38–18)	Virginia (46–13)	Ole Miss (43–20)	Alabama (44–21)	Alabama (44–21)	9.
10.	Georgia Tech	Arizona State (5–1)	Texas (3–4)	Oregon State (3–3)	Stanford (9–4)	Arkansas (13–1)	Arkansas (16–1)	Arkansas (17–3)	Texas (19–10)	Alabama (22–9)	Mississippi State (25–6)	Arizona state (27–11)	Florida State (33–10)	Houston (31–16)	Houston (34–17)	Nebraska (37–12)	Georgia (38–17)	Georgia (41–19)	Oklahoma (44–20)	Oklahoma (45–22)	Oklahoma (45–22)	10.
11.	Miami (FL)	Pepperdine (2–1)	Stanford (4–2)	Texas (5–5)	Texas (9–6)	Stanford (10–5)	Arizona State (17–5)	Wichita State (20–3)	Miami (FL) (23–7)	Georgia Tech (22–6)	Georgia Tech (25–8)	Miami (FL) (26–13)	NC State (31–13)	Oklahoma (35–11)	Oklahoma (37–13)	Houston (35–19)	Houston (36–19)	Houston (39–20)	Miami (FL) (39–21)	Ole Miss (44–22)	Ole Miss (44–22)	11.
12.	Arizona State	Long Beach State (3–0)	Cal State Fullerton (3–3)	Stanford (5–3)	Pepperdine (8–6)	Oregon State (9–4)	Mississippi State (11–0)	Miami (FL) (21–6)	Arizona State (21–7)	Vanderbilt (19–9)	NC State (27–9)	Alabama (27–12)	Clemson (29–13)	Virginia (38–10)	Virginia (39–10)	Georgia (35–16)	Oklahoma State (39–15)	Nebraska (42–15)	South Carolina (40–23)	South Carolina (41–25)	South Carolina (41–25)	12.
13.	Pepperdine	San Diego (3–0)	Tennessee (4–1)	Tennessee (6–1)	Cal State Fullerton (8–4)	Arizona State (14–5)	Cal State Fullerton (14–6)	Clemson (11–6)	Wichita State (21–5)	Arizona State (23–9)	Arizona State (25–10)	South Carolina (29–8)	Houston (28–15)	Florida State (35–11)	Arkansas (34–15)	Oklahoma State (36–14)	Oklahoma (39–17)	Oklahoma (40–19)	College of Charleston (46–15)	College of Charleston (46–17)	College of Charleston (46–17)	13.
14.	Missouri	Texas (0–3)	Pepperdine (3–3)	Cal State Fullerton (5–4)	Oregon State (6–4)	Cal State Fullerton (10–6)	Oregon State (11–5)	LSU (17–5)	Virginia (22–5)	Miami (FL) (23–10)	Miami (FL) (24–12)	Oregon State (25–9)	Oklahoma (32–10)	Georgia Tech (33–12)	Notre Dame (37–11)	Arizona State (32–17)	Nebraska (39–14)	Oklahoma State (39–18)	Oral Roberts (41–14)	Oral Roberts (41–16)	Oral Roberts (41–16)	14.
15.	LSU	Cal State Fullerton (0–3)	Long Beach State (4–2)	LSU (6–1)	South Carolina (8–1)	Texas A&M (13–2)	Florida (14–6)	Tennessee (14–5)	LSU (19–7)	NC State (25–8)	Arkansas (25–8)	Mississippi State (26–9)	Virginia (34–10)	Kentucky (34–11)	Florida State (37–12)	Oklahoma (37–16)	Arkansas (38–17)	Arkansas (38–19)	Stanford (33–25)	Stanford (33–27)	Stanford (33–27)	15.
16.	Long Beach State	Missouri (0–0)	LSU (2–1)	South Carolina (5–1)	Long Beach State (9–4)	Florida (9–6)	Texas (13–9)	Texas (15–10)	Alabama (19–8)	Oregon State (19–8)	Vanderbilt (21–11)	Notre Dame (27–8)	Arizona State (28–14)	Miami (FL) (29–16)	Georgia Tech (36–12)	Tulane (37–16)	Georgia Tech (42–14)	Georgia Tech (45–16)	Missouri (35–26)	Missouri (35–28)	Missouri (35–28)	16.
17.	South Carolina	LSU (0–0)	South Carolina (2–1)	Long Beach State (6–4)	NC State (12–1)	Texas (10–8)	Stanford (11–7)	Arizona State (18–7)	Vanderbilt (17–7)	Arkansas (23–6)	Old Dominion (31–4)	Vanderbilt (25–12)	Miami (FL) (27–15)	Ole Miss (30–15)	Miami (FL) (32–16)	Georgia Tech (39–13)	Tulane (39–17)	Arizona State (36–19)	Texas (41–21)	Texas (41–21)	Texas (41–21)	17.
18.	Florida Atlantic	South Carolina (0–0)	Miami (FL) (5–3)	NC State (8–1)	Ole Miss (6–1)	Mississippi State (6–0)	Baylor (12–4)	Stanford (11–7)	Oregon State (15–7)	Old Dominion (29–3)	Southern California (20–14)	Virginia (31–9)	Kentucky (30–10)	NC State (32–15)	NC State (33–15)	Miami (FL) (34–17)	Arizona State (33–19)	Ole Miss (40–20)	Kentucky (44–17)	Kentucky (44–17)	Kentucky (44–17)	18.
19.	Tennessee	Tennessee (2–1)	NC State (6–0)	Ole Miss (2–0)	Arkansas (9–0)	Baylor (9–3)	Wichita State (17–2)	Oregon State (12–7)	Georgia (17–5)	Wake Forest (23–7)	Oregon State (21–9)	Houston (24–15)	South Carolina (30–11)	South Carolina (32–12)	Wake Forest (31–15)	Ole Miss (33–19)	Ole Miss (36–20)	Tulane (41–19)	Evansville (43–22)	Evansville (43–22)	Evansville (43–22)	19.
20.	Ole Miss	Florida Atlantic (1–2)	Missouri (2–2)	Baylor (4–0)	Georgia (6–0)	Wichita State (13–2)	Miami (FL) (16–6)	NC State (21–5)	Arkansas (20–5)	Virginia (24–8)	Virginia (27–9)	Arkansas (27–10)	Mississippi State (29–11)	Arizona State (29–16)	Arizona State (30–16)	Arkansas (35–17)	Miami (FL) (35–19)	Notre Dame (45–15–1)	Virginia (47–15)	Virginia (47–15)	Virginia (47–15)	20.
21.	Southern California	Miami (FL) (3–2)	Ole Miss (0–0)	Tulane (6–1)	Tulane (8–3)	Miami (FL) (12–6)	Oklahoma (16–4)	Virginia (19–4)	Kentucky (20–5)	Fresno State (24–9)	Notre Dame (22–8)	Old Dominion (33–6)	Wake Forest (30–14)	Wake Forest (30–14)	Tulane (34–16)	Notre Dame (38–13–1)	Notre Dame (41–14–1)	Miami (FL) (36–21)	Houston (39–22)	Houston (39–22)	Houston (39–22)	21.
22.	Notre Dame	Ole Miss (0–0)	Notre Dame (0–0)	Notre Dame (0–0)	Arizona State (10–5)	Tulane (10–4)	NC State (18–4)	Oklahoma (18–5)	Tennessee (17–7)	College of Charleston (23–6)	College of Charleston (27–6)	Southern California (22–16)	Ole Miss (26–15)	Washington (30–16)	Southern Miss (34–16)	Wake Forest (33–17)	Florida State (39–17)	Fresno State (43–16)	Nebraska (42–17)	Nebraska (42–17)	Nebraska (42–17)	22.
23.	Baylor	Notre Dame (0–0)	Baylor (3–0)	Missouri (4–2)	Baylor (6–2)	Oklahoma (12–4)	Georgia (11–2)	Baylor (14–6)	Oklahoma (20–6)	Creighton (18–6)	Fresno State (26–10)	Oklahoma (28–10)	Arkansas (30–12)	Arkansas (31–14)	Ole Miss (31–18)	NC State (34–17)	Michigan (38–18)	Michigan (42–19)	Oklahoma State (41–20)	Oklahoma State (41–20)	Oklahoma State (41–20)	23.
24.	Tulane	Baylor (0–0)	Tulane (2–1)	Arkansas (6–0)	Hawaii (11–3)	Pepperdine (9–9)	Tulane (12–6)	Kansas State (16–1)	Baylor (16–8)	Ohio State (15–6)	Ohio State (19–7)	Wake Forest (28–12)	Vanderbilt (25–16)	Vanderbilt (27–18)	South Carolina (32–16)	Baylor (33–19)	San Francisco (37–19)	Florida State (42–19)	Florida State (44–21)	Florida State (44–21)	Florida State (44–21)	24.
25.	Stanford	Tulane (0–0)	Wichita State (4–1)	Cal Poly (9–3)	Oklahoma (9–3)	Long Beach State (10–7)	Washington (15–5)	James Madison (16–4)	James Madison (19–5)	Kentucky (22–7)	Kentucky (25–8)	College of Charleston (30–7)	Old Dominion (35–8)	Old Dominion (35–8)	Georgia (31–16)	Florida State (37–15)	Pepperdine (38–18)	Pepperdine (40–19)	Arkansas (39–21)	Arkansas (39–21)	Arkansas (39–21)	25.
26.	Wichita State	Winthrop (2–1)	Winthrop (3–2)	Winthrop (7–2)	Winthrop (10–2)	NC State (13–4)	Pepperdine (12–10)	Kentucky (17–4)	Winthrop (21–5)	Texas Tech (22–10)	Baylor (22–11)	Kentucky (26–10)	College of Charleston (33–9)	Troy (34–12)	Oklahoma State (33–13)	South Carolina (34–18)	NC State (35–19)	NC State (38–21)	Baylor (37–26)	Baylor (37–26_	Baylor (37–26)	26.
27.	TCU	Wichita State (0–0)	Cal Poly (7–2)	Miami (FL) (6–6)	Miami (FL) (9–6)	Ole Miss (8–3)	Long Beach State (12–9)	Creighton (15–3)	Old Dominion (25–3)	Tennessee (18–10)	Creighton (20–8)	LSU (26–12)	Washington (27–15)	Pepperdine (30–16)	Old Dominion (37–9)	Michigan (33–18)	Wake Forest (33–20)	Troy (45–14)	Tulane (43–210	Tulane (43–21)	Tulane (43–21)	27.
28.	Winthrop	TCU (0–0)	TCU (2–1)	Southern California (7–4)	Wichita State (9–2)	Georgia (7–2)	Winthrop (15–4)	Cal Poly (15–8)	Washington State (20–6)	Oklahoma (21–9)	Georgia (21–10)	San Diego (24–14)	Pepperdine (27–16)	Tulane (30–16)	Pepperdine (33–17)	Pepperdine (36–18)	Hawaii (40–13)	Kansas (42–23)	Fresno State (45–18)	Fresno State (45–18)	Fresno State (45–18)	28.
29.	Oklahoma	Cal Poly (5–1)	Gonzaga (6–1)	Wichita State (6–2)	Texas A&M (10–1)	Cal Poly (12–6)	Kansas State (12–1)	Winthrop (18–5)	Missouri (15–8)	LSU (20–10)	Oklahoma (24–10)	Winthrop (29–10)	Baylor (25–16)	Southern Miss (31–16)	Hawaii (37–12)	Hawaii (37–12)	Troy (41–14)	Evansville (40–20)	NC State (40–23)	NC State (40–23)	NC State (40–23)	29.
30.	Southern Miss	Southern Miss (0–0)	Kansas (6–2)	Arizona State (8–4)	Cal Poly (10–5)	Alabama (12–3)	James Madison (11–4)	Old Dominion (22–3)	Tulane (17–9)	Winthrop (23–7)	LSU (23–11)	James Madison (25–14)	Winthrop (31–12)	Winthrop (33–120	Winthrop (37–12)	Winthrop (41–12)	Vanderbilt (33–23)	Vanderbilt (36–25)	Pepperdine (42–21)	Pepperdine (42–21)	Pepperdine (42–21)	30.
	Preseason Dec 23	Week 1 Feb 6	Week 2 Feb 13	Week 3 Feb 20	Week 4 Feb 27	Week 5 Mar 6	Week 6 Mar 13	Week 7 Mar 20	Week 8 Mar 27	Week 9 Apr 3	Week 10 Apr 10	Week 11 Apr 17	Week 12 Apr 24	Week 13 May 1	Week 14 May 8	Week 15 May 15	Week 16 May 22	Week 17 May 29	Week 18 June 6	Week 19 June 12	Week 20 June 27	
		Dropped: 21 Southern California; 29 Oklahoma	Dropped: 20 Florida Atlantic; 30 Southern Miss	Dropped: 28 TCU; 29 Gonzaga; 30 Kansas	Dropped: 8 San Diego; 22 Notre Dame; 23 Missouri; 28 Southern California	Dropped: 24 Hawaii; 26 Winthrop	Dropped: 15 Texas A&M; 27 Ole Miss; 29 Cal Poly; 30 Alabama	Dropped: 23 Georgia; 24 Tulane; 25 Washington; 26 Pepperdine; 27 Long Beach State	Dropped: 9 Florida; 18 Stanford; 20 NC State; 24 Kansas State; 27 Creighton; 28 Cal Poly	Dropped: 13 Wichita State; 19 Georgia; 24 Baylor; 25 James Madison; 28 Washington State; 29 Missouri; 30 Tulane	Dropped: 19 Wake Forest; 26 Texas Tech; 27 Tennessee; 30 Winthrop	Dropped: 23 Fresno State; 24 Ohio State; 26 Baylor; 27 Creighton; 28 Georgia	Dropped: 22 Southern California; 27 LSU; 28 San Diego; 30 James Madison	Dropped: 20 Mississippi State; 26 College of Charleston; 29 Baylor	Dropped: 22 Washington; 24 Vanderbilt; 26 Troy	Dropped: 22 Southern Miss; 27 Old Dominion	Dropped: 24 Baylor; 26 South Carolina; 30 Winthrop	Dropped: 24 San Francisco; 27 Wake Forest; 28 Hawaii	Dropped: 17 Arizona State; 20 Notre Dame; 23 Michigan; 27 Troy; 28 Kansas; 30 Vanderbilt	None	None	

The preseason poll ranked the top 40 teams. Remaining teams not listed were: 31. Arizona 32. Houston 33. Arkansas 34. Mississippi State 35. San Francisco 36. San Diego 37. Stetson 38. Washington 39. Georgia 40. Fresno State

== NCBWA ==
	Preseason Jan 17	Week 1 Feb 6	Week 2 Feb 13	Week 3 Feb 20	Week 4 Feb 27	Week 5 Mar 6	Week 6 Mar 13	Week 7 Mar 20	Week 8 Mar 27	Week 9 Apr 3	Week 10 Apr 10	Week 11 Apr 17	Week 12 Apr 24	Week 13 May 1	Week 14 May 8	Week 15 May 15	Week 16 May 22	Week 17 May 29	Week 18 June 6	Week 19 June 13	Week 20 June 27	
1.	Texas	Florida (0–0)	Florida (3–0)	Florida (6–1)	Rice (10–2)	Rice (13–3)	Georgia Tech (16–1)	Florida State (21–2)	Florida State (25–2)	South Carolina (26–3)	North Carolina (27–7)	Rice (32–8)	Rice (35–9)	Rice (39–9)	Rice (39–9)	Rice (42–10)	Rice (46–10)	Rice (50–10)	Rice (53–10)	Rice (55–11)	Oregon State (50–16)	1.
2.	Florida	Rice (1–0)	Rice (4–1)	Rice (6–2)	North Carolina (7–0)	Georgia Tech (13–0)	Florida State (18–1)	North Carolina (17–3)	Nebraska (17–3)	North Carolina (23–6)	Rice (28–8)	North Carolina (31–7)	North Carolina (34–8)	North Carolina (39–8)	North Carolina (39–8)	Clemson (39–13)	Clemson (43–13)	Clemson (47–14)	Clemson (50–14)	Clemson (52–14)	North Carolina (54–15)	2.
3.	Oregon State	Oregon State (0–0)	Oregon State (2–1)	Clemson (3–0)	Georgia Tech (10–0)	North Carolina (10–1)	North Carolina (13–2)	Nebraska (15–2)	Mississippi State (19–1)	Rice (24–8)	Florida State (31–4)	Nebraska (28–5)	Nebraska (32–6)	Nebraska (36–6)	Cal State Fullerton (35–12)	Cal State Fullerton (36–12)	Cal State Fullerton (39–13)	Cal State Fullerton (43–13)	Cal State Fullerton (46–13)	Cal State Fullerton (48–13)	Rice (57–13)	3.
4.	Rice	Nebraska (0–0)	Clemson (0–0)	North Carolina (3–0)	Clemson (5–1)	Clemson (7–2)	Rice (15–5)	Rice (18–6)	Georgia Tech (20–4)	Florida State (27–4)	Nebraska (24–5)	Cal State Fullerton (28–9)	Cal State Fullerton (31–10)	Cal State Fullerton (33–11)	Clemson (33–13)	Texas (38–15)	North Carolina (45–11)	Alabama (41–19)	Alabama (44–19)	Oregon State (44–14)	Cal State Fullerton (50–15)	4.
5.	Nebraska	Clemson (0–0)	Nebraska (0–0)	Georgia Tech (6–0)	Florida (8–3)	Florida State (14–1)	Clemson (10–3) т	Georgia Tech (18–3)	South Carolina (22–3)	Mississippi State (22–3)	Cal State Fullerton (26–8)	Florida State (33–6)	Georgia Tech (32–9)	Clemson (33–13)	Texas (36–15)	North Carolina (41–11)	Virginia (45–11)	Oregon State (39–14)	Oregon State (42–14)	North Carolina (50–13)	Clemson (53–16)	5.
6.	Clemson	Florida State (3–0)	North Carolina (0–0)	Florida State (7–1)	Florida State (10–1)	Nebraska (8–2)	Nebraska (11–2) т	Mississippi State (15–0)	North Carolina (20–5)	Cal State Fullerton (24–7)	Clemson (24–8)	Clemson (27–10)	Oregon State (28–9)	Oregon State (32–10)	Oregon State (34–11)	Virginia (41–11)	Alabama (39–17) т	Virginia (46–13)	North Carolina (48–13)	Georgia Tech (50–16)	Miami (FL) (42–24)	6.
7.	North Carolina	North Carolina (0–0)	Georgia Tech (2–0)	Nebraska (3–1)	Nebraska (5–2)	Arkansas (13–1)	Arkansas (16–1)	South Carolina (17–3)	Rice (20–8)	Nebraska (20–5)	South Carolina (27–6)	Texas (27–12)	Clemson (29–13)	Alabama (34–13)	Nebraska (36–8)	Georgia Tech (39–13)	Oregon State (38–13) т	North Carolina (45–13)	Georgia Tech (48–16)	Georgia (47–21)	Georgia Tech (50–18)	7.
8.	Cal State Fullerton	Arizona State (5–1)	Florida State (4–1)	Tulane (6–1)	Arkansas (9–0)	Tennessee (11–2)	Mississippi State (11–0)	Arkansas (17–3)	Cal State Fullerton (20–7)	Clemson (20–7)	Mississippi State (25–6)	South Carolina (29–8)	Alabama (31–12)	Texas (31–15)	Georgia Tech (36–12)	Kentucky (40–11)	Kentucky (42–13)	Georgia Tech (45–16) т	Georgia (45–20)	Miami (FL) (41–22)	Georgia (47–23)	8.
9.	Florida State	Georgia Tech (0–0)	Tulane (2–1)	Arkansas (6–0)	Tulane (8–3)	Tulane (10–4)	Tennessee (13–2)	Cal State Fullerton (17–6)	Clemson (16–6)	Georgia Tech (22–6)	Texas (24–11)	Georgia Tech (28–9)	Texas (28–15)	Oklahoma (35–11)	Virginia (39–10)	Oregon State (35–13)	Georgia Tech (42–14)	Nebraska (42–15) т	Oklahoma (44–20)	Alabama (44–21)	Alabama (44–21)	9.
10.	Arizona State	Texas (0–3)	Texas (3–4)	Oregon State (3–3)	Tennessee (7–2)	Oregon State (9–4)	LSU (16–3)	Florida (17–7)	Arkansas (20–5)	Arkansas (23–6)	Georgia Tech (25–8)	Arizona State (27–11)	Oklahoma (32–10)	Georgia Tech (33–12)	Arkansas (34–15)	Alabama (36–17)	Texas (38–18)	Texas (40–19)	Ole Miss (43–20)	Oklahoma (45–22)	Oklahoma (45–22)	10.
11.	Georgia Tech	Long Beach State (3–0)	Long Beach State (4–2)	Tennessee (6–1)	Texas (9–6)	LSU (13–2)	Oregon State (11–5)	Clemson (11–6)	Arizona State (21–7)	Texas (21–11)	Arkansas (25–8)	Oregon State (25–9)	Arkansas (30–12)	Virginia (38–10)	Alabama (34–16)	Nebraska (37–12)	Nebraska (39–14) т	Kentucky (42–15)	College of Charleston (46–15)	Ole Miss (44–22)	Ole Miss (44–22)	11.
12.	Pepperdine	Pepperdine (2–1)	Cal State Fullerton (3–3)	Texas (5–5)	Oregon State (6–4)	Mississippi State (6–0)	South Carolina (13–2)	Wichita State (20–3)	Oregon State (15–7)	Arizona State (23–9)	Alabama (25–10)	Arkansas (27–10)	Florida State (33–10)	South Carolina (32–12)	Florida State (37–12)	Arizona State (32–17)	Tulane (39–17) т	Houston (39–20)	Miami (FL) (39–210	College of Charleston (46–17)	College of Charleston (46–17)	12.
13.	Miami (FL)	Tulane (0–0)	Arkansas (3–0)	Cal State Fullerton (5–4)	Cal State Fullerton (8–4)	Florida (9–6)	Arizona State (17–5) т	LSU (17–5)	Texas (19–10)	Oregon State (19–8)	Arizona State (25–10)	NC State (30–10)	South Carolina (30–11)	Florida State (35–11)	Oklahoma (37–13)	Tulane (37–16)	Houston (36–19)	Georgia (41–19)	Virginia (47–15)	South Carolina (41–25)	South Carolina (41–25)	13.
14.	Tulane	Stanford (3–0)	Tennessee (4–1)	San Diego (7–2)	LSU (10–1)	Arizona State (14–5)	Florida (14–6) т	NC State (21–5)	Tulane (17–9)	NC State (25–8)	NC State (27–9)	Alabama (27–12)	Virginia (34–10)	Notre Dame (35–9–1)	Kentucky (37–11)	Houston (35–19)	Oklahoma (39–17)	Tulane (41–19)	Texas (41–21)	Oral Roberts (41–16)	Virginia (47–15)	14.
15.	LSU	Cal State Fullerton (0–3)	Stanford (4–2)	Long Beach State (6–4)	Long Beach State (9–4)	South Carolina (9–2)	Tulane (12–6) т	Oregon State (12–7)	Oklahoma (20–6)	Alabama (22–9)	Oregon State (21–9)	Mississippi State (26–9)	Notre Dame (32–8)	Arkansas (31–14)	Houston (34–17)	Florida State (37–15)	Georgia (38–17)	Oklahoma (40–19)	South Carolina (40–23)	Virginia (47–15)	Oral Roberts (41–16)	15.
16.	Missouri	LSU (0–0)	Mississippi State (0–0)	LSU (6–1)	NC State (12–1)	Cal State Fullerton (10–6)	Cal State Fullerton (14–6)	Tennessee (14–5)	Wichita State (21–5)	Old Dominion (29–3)	Old Dominion (31–4)	Oklahoma (28–10)	Arizona State (28–14)	Houston (31–16)	Notre Dame (37–11–1)	Winthrop (41–12)	Arizona State (33–19)	Notre Dame (45–15–1)	Kentucky (44–17)	Texas (41–21)	Texas (41–21)	16.
17.	Long Beach State	Missouri (0–0)	LSU (2–1)	Stanford (5–3)	Stanford (9–4)	Stanford (10–5)	Wichita State (17–2)	Arizona State (18–7)	LSU (19–7)	Oklahoma (21–9)	College of Charleston (27–6)	College of Charleston (30–7)	College of Charleston (33–9)	Tulane (30–16)	Tulane (34–16)	Arkansas (35–17)	Arkansas (38–17)	Ole Miss (40–20)	Nebraska (42–17)	Kentucky (44–17)	Kentucky (44–17)	17.
18.	Mississippi State	Mississippi State (0–0)	San Diego (5–1)	Pepperdine (6–4)	Mississippi State (3–0)	Wichita State (13–2)	Texas (13–9)	Tulane (14–8)	Florida (17–11)	Tulane (18–12)	Oklahoma (24–10)	Virginia (31–9)	NC State (31–13)	Arizona State (29–16)	Arizona State (30–16)	Oklahoma (37–16)	Oklahoma State (39–15)	Arizona State (36–19)	Oral Roberts (41–14)	Stanford (33–27)	Stanford (33–27)	18.
19.	Arkansas	Tennessee (2–1)	Pepperdine (3–3)	Mississippi State (0–0)	South Carolina (8–1)	Texas (10–8)	NC State (18–4)	Oklahoma (18–5) т	Miami (FL) (23–7)	Florida (19–13)	Virginia (27–9)	Old Dominion (33–6)	Mississippi State (29–11)	Kentucky (34–11)	South Carolina (32–16)	Notre Dame (38–13–1)	Notre Dame (41–14–1)	Arkansas (38–19)	Stanford (33–25)	Missouri (35–28)	Nebraska (42–17)	19.
20.	Tennessee	Arkansas (0–0)	Miami (FL) (5–3)	NC State (8–1)	Pepperdine (8–6)	Long Beach State (10–7)	Southern Miss (13–4)	Texas (15–10) т	Southern Miss (20–6)	College of Charleston (23–6)	Winthrop (26–9)	LSU (26–12)	Tulane (27–15)	College of Charleston (33–10)	Old Dominion (37–9)	College of Charleston (38–12) т	Florida State (39–17)	Florida State (42–19)	Tulane (43–21)	Nebraska (42–17)	Missouri (35–28)	20.
21.	TCU	Miami (FL) (3–2)	NC State (6–0)	South Carolina (5–1)	Arizona State (10–5)	Texas A&M (13–2)	Oklahoma (16–4)	Miami (FL) (21–6)	NC State (21–8)	Wichita State (22–9)	LSU (23–11)	Winthrop (29–10)	Houston (28–15)	Old Dominion (35–8)	Winthrop (37–12)	Miami (FL) (34–17) т	Winthrop (42–14)	Oklahoma State (39–18)	Missouri (35–26)	Tulane (43–21)	Tulane (43–21)	21.
22.	Notre Dame	TCU (0–0)	TCU (2–1)	Arizona State (8–4)	Ole Miss (6–1)	NC State (13–4)	Miami (FL) (16–6)	Southern Miss (16–5)	Tennessee (17–7)	Virginia (24–8)	Southern Miss (24–10)	Notre Dame (27–8)	Old Dominion (35–8)	NC State (32–15)	NC State (33–15)	South Carolina (34–18)	Ole Miss (36–20) т	Pepperdine (40–19)	Oklahoma State (41–20)	Oklahoma State (41–20)	Florida State (44–21)	22.
23.	Ole Miss	San Diego (3–0)	Arizona State (5–4)	Ole Miss (2–0)	Winthrop (10–2)	Ole Miss (8–3)	Stanford (11–7)	Stanford (11–7)	Virginia (22–5)	Winthrop (23–7)	Tulane (20–14)	Tulane (23–15)	Wichita State (31–14)	Wichita State (34–15)	Miami (FL) (32–16)	Georgia (35–16)	Wichita State (43–18) т	College of Charleston (43–15)	Florida State (44–21)	Florida State (44–21)	Oklahoma State (41–20)	23.
24.	Wichita State	Notre Dame (0–0)	Missouri (2–2)	Winthrop (7–2)	Wichita State (9–2)	Southern Miss (9–3)	Baylor (12–4) т	Baylor (14–6)	Winthrop (21–5)	Tennessee (18–10)	Wichita State (24–11)	Southern Miss (26–12) т	Winthrop (31–12)	Miami (FL) (29–16)	College of Charleston (33–11)	Oklahoma State (36–14)	Miami (FL) (35–19)	Winthrop (44–16)	Pepperdine (42–210	Pepperdine (42–21)	Pepperdine (42–21)	24.
25.	Southern California	Ole Miss (0–0)	Notre Dame (0–0)	Missouri (4–2)	Georgia (6–0)	Miami (FL) (12–6)	Long Beach State (12–9) т	Winthrop (18–5) т	Georgia (17–5)	LSU (20–10)	Georgia (21–10)	Miami (FL) (26–13) т	Troy (32–10)	Winthrop (33–12)	LSU (32–17)	Wichita State (40–18)	Pepperdine (38–18)	Hawaii (43–15)	Houston (39–22)	Houston (39–22)	Houston (39–22)	25.
26.	Winthrop	South Carolina (0–0)	Ole Miss (0–0)	Wichita State (6–2)	Hawaii (11–3)	Oklahoma (12–4)	Georgia (11–2)	Virginia (19–4) т	Alabama (19–8)	Miami (FL) (23–10)	Ohio State (19–7)	Vanderbilt (25–12)	Kentucky (30–10)	Ole Miss (30–15)	Mississippi State (33–16)	Old Dominion (38–12)	South Carolina (36–20)	Miami (FL) (36–21)	Arizona State (37–21)	Winthrop (46–18)	Winthrop (46–18)	26.
27.	NC State	Winthrop (2–1)	South Carolina (2–1)	Notre Dame (0–0)	San Diego (7–6)	Baylor (9–3)	Winthrop (15–4)	Kansas State (16–1)	Old Dominion (25–3)	Southern Miss (21–9)	Florida (20–16)	Houston (24–15)	Miami (FL) (27–15)	Mississippi State (30–15)	Wake Forest (31–15)	NC State (34–17)	Elon (42–14)	NC State (38–21)	Winthrop (46–18)	Arizona State (37–21)	Arkansas (39–21)	27.
28.	Oklahoma	NC State (3–0)	Wichita State (4–1)	TCU (4–3)	Southern Miss (6–2)	Pepperdine (9–9)	Pepperdine (12–10)	College of Charleston (17–4)	College of Charleston (20–5)	Vanderbilt (19–9)	Notre Dame (22–8)	Wichita State (27–13)	Wake Forest (30–14)	LSU (29–17)	Oklahoma State (33–13)	Wake Forest (33–17)	College of Charleston (39–15)	Kansas (42–23)	Arkansas (39–21) т	Evansville (43–22) т	Arizona State (37–21)	28.
29.	Stanford	Wichita State (0–0)	Winthrop (3–2)	Miami (FL) 6–6)	Miami (FL) (9–6)	Winthrop (12–4)	Ole Miss (10–6)	Georgia (14–4)	Baylor (16–8)	West Virginia (23–4)	Miami (FL) (24–12)	Troy (27–10)	LSU (26–16)	Wake Forest (30–14)	Wichita State (36–17)	Elon (39–13)	Hawaii (40–13)	Michigan (42–19)	Notre Dame (45–17–1) т	Arkansas (39–21) т	Evansville (43–22)	29.
30.	Southern Miss	Southern Miss (0–0)	Kansas (6–2)	Baylor (4–0)	Oklahoma (9–3)	Wake Forest (10–3)	Hawaii (17–6)	Old Dominion (22–3)	Kentucky (20–5)	Wake Forest (23–7)	Kentucky (25–8)	Wake Forest (28–12)	Kansas (29–16) т; Vanderbilt (25–16) т	Troy (34–12)	Georgia (31–16)	Ole Miss (33–19)	NC State (35–19)	Wichita State (44–20)	Wichita State (46–22)	Baylor (37–26)	Baylor (37–26)	30.
	Preseason Jan 17	Week 1 Feb 6	Week 2 Feb 13	Week 3 Feb 20	Week 4 Feb 27	Week 5 Mar 6	Week 6 Mar 13	Week 7 Mar 20	Week 8 Mar 27	Week 9 Apr 3	Week 10 Apr 10	Week 11 Apr 17	Week 12 Apr 24	Week 13 May 1	Week 14 May 8	Week 15 May 15	Week 16 May 22	Week 17 May 29	Week 18 June 6	Week 19 June 13	Week 20 June 27	
		Dropped: 25 Southern California; 28 Oklahoma	Dropped: 30 Southern Miss	Dropped: 30 Kansas	Dropped: 25 Missouri; 27 Notre Dame; 28 TCU; 30 Baylor	Dropped: 25 Georgia; 26 Hawaii; 27 San Diego	Dropped: 21 Texas A&M; 30 Wake Forest	Dropped: 24 Long Beach State; 28 Pepperdine; 29 Ole Miss; 30 Hawaii	Dropped: 23 Stanford; 27 Kansas State	Dropped: 25 Georgia; 29 Baylor; 30 Kentucky	Dropped: 24 Tennessee; 28 Vanderbilt; 29 West Virginia; 30 Wake Forest	Dropped: 25 Georgia; 26 Ohio State; 27 Florida; 30 Kentucky	Dropped: 24 Southern Miss	Dropped: 30 Kansas; 30 Vanderbilt	Dropped: 26 Ole Miss; 30 Troy	Dropped: 25 LSU; 26 Mississippi State	Dropped: 26 Old Dominion; 28 Wake Forest	Dropped: 26 South Carolina; 27 Elon	Dropped: 25 Hawaii; 27 NC State; 28 Kansas; 29 Michigan	Dropped: 28 Notre Dame; 30 Wichita State	None	
