= 2006 ACC tournament =

2006 ACC tournament may refer to:

- 2006 ACC men's basketball tournament
- 2006 ACC women's basketball tournament
- 2006 ACC men's soccer tournament
- 2006 ACC women's soccer tournament
- 2006 Atlantic Coast Conference baseball tournament
- 2006 Atlantic Coast Conference softball tournament
