= 2006 Miami Hurricanes baseball team =

American college baseball season

2006 Miami Hurricanes baseball

NCAA Oxford Super Regional champions NCAA Lincoln Regional champions

College World Series, 1–2
- Conference: Atlantic Coast Conference
- Record: 42–24 (17–13 ACC)
- Head coach: Jim Morris (13th year)
- Home stadium: Mark Light Field

2006 Atlantic Coast Conference baseball standings
	Conf.				Overall
Team	W		L	PCT	W		L	PCT
Atlantic
No. 5 Clemson ^{x}‍‍‡‍^{y}	24	–	6	.800	53	–	16	.768
No. 24 Florida State ‍‍‍^{y}	16	–	13	.552	44	–	21	.677
No. 29 NC State ‍‍‍^{y}	16	–	13	.552	40	–	23	.635
Wake Forest ‍‍‍	16	–	13	.552	33	–	22	.600
Boston College ‍‍‍	9	–	21	.300	28	–	25	.528
Maryland ‍‍‍	8	–	22	.267	26	–	30	.464
Coastal
No. 2 North Carolina ^{x}‍‍‍^{y}	22	–	8	.733	54	–	15	.783
No. 20 Virginia ‍‍‍^{y}	21	–	9	.700	47	–	15	.758
No. 8 Georgia Tech ‍‍‍^{y}	19	–	11	.633	50	–	18	.735
No. 6 Miami (FL) ‍‍‍^{y}	17	–	13	.567	42	–	24	.636
Duke ‍‍‍	6	–	24	.200	15	–	40	.273
Virginia Tech ‍‍‍	4	–	25	.138	20	–	33	.377
x – Division champion ‡ – Tournament champion y – Invited to the NCAA tournament As of June 30, 2006; Rankings from Collegiate Baseball

The 2006 Miami Hurricanes baseball team represented the University of Miami in the 2006 NCAA Division I baseball season. The Hurricanes played their home games at Mark Light Field. The team was coached by Jim Morris in his thirteenth season at Miami. Playing in the Atlantic Coast Conference's Coastal Division, they finished in fourth place in their division with a record of 17–13, 42–24 overall.

The Hurricanes reached the College World Series, where they finished tied for fifth after splitting a pair of games with eventual champion Oregon State and losing another to Rice.

== Personnel ==
=== Roster ===
2006 Miami Hurricanes roster
Pitchers: 17 - Andrew Lane - Senior; 21 - Michael Sanders – (redshirt) Freshman; 24 - Scott Maine - (redshirt) Sophomore; 27 - Danny Gil - Junior; 28 - Anthony Perez - Freshman; 31 - Jon McLean - Senior; 32 - Raudel Alfonso - Sophomore; 35 - Manny Miguelez - Sophomore; 36 - Jason Santana – (redshirt) Freshman; 40 - Ricky Orta - Junior; 41 - Teddy Kaufman - Freshman; 43 - Chris Perez - Junior; 44 - Carlos Gutierrez - Sophomore; 45 - Marcelo Albir - Senior; 47 - David Gutierrez - Freshman	Catchers: 10 - Eddy Rodríguez - Junior; 34 - Richard O'Brien Jr. - Junior; 38 - Ben Vazquez - Freshman; Outfielders: 4 - Nick Freitas - Freshman; 8 - Tommy Giles - Senior; 9 - Blake Tekotte - Freshman; 30 - Jon Jay - Junior; 39 - Joseph Paniagua - Freshman	Infielders: 0 - Roger Tomas - Junior; 2 - Jemile Weeks - Freshman; 13 - Chris Petralli - Junior; 16 - Gus Menendez - Junior; 18 - Dennis Raben - Freshman; 19 - Yonder Alonso - Freshman; 22 - Danny Valencia - Junior; 48 - Chris Gawenda - Freshman

=== Coaches ===
2006 Miami Hurricanes baseball coaching staff
- Jim Morris – Head coach – 13th year

== Schedule and results ==
Legend
Miami win
Miami loss

2006 Miami Hurricanes baseball game log
Regular season

January/February
Date	Opponent	Rank	Site/stadium	Score	Overall record	ACC record
Jan 28	FIU*	No. 11	Mark Light Field • Coral Gables, FL	W 17–3	1–0	
Jan 29	at FIU*	No. 11	FIU Baseball Stadium • Miami, FL	W 5–0	2–0	
Feb 3	No. 28 Winthrop*	No. 11	Mark Light Field • Coral Gables, FL	W 16–4	3–0	
Feb 5	No. 28 Winthrop*	No. 11	Mark Light Field • Coral Gables, FL	L 3–8	3–1	
Feb 5	No. 28 Winthrop*	No. 11	Mark Light Field • Coral Gables, FL	L 3–4	3–2	
Feb 10	at UCLA*	No. 21	Jackie Robinson Stadium • Los Angeles, CA	W 3–1	4–2	
Feb 11	at UCLA*	No. 21	Jackie Robinson Stadium • Los Angeles, CA	L 4–7	4–3	
Feb 12	at UCLA*	No. 21	Jackie Robinson Stadium • Los Angeles, CA	W 5–2	5–3	
Feb 15	Louisville*	No. 18	Mark Light Field • Coral Gables, FL	W 13–4	6–3	
Feb 17	No. 1 Florida*	No. 18	Mark Light Field • Coral Gables, FL	L 1–2	6–4	
Feb 18	No. 1 Florida*	No. 18	Mark Light Field • Coral Gables, FL	L 1–4	6–5	
Feb 19	No. 1 Florida*	No. 18	Mark Light Field • Coral Gables, FL	L 10–11	6–6	
Feb 25	Bethune–Cookman*	No. 27	Mark Light Field • Coral Gables, FL	W 4–3	7–6	
Feb 25	Bethune–Cookman*	No. 27	Mark Light Field • Coral Gables, FL	W 9–1	8–6	
Feb 26	Bethune–Cookman*	No. 27	Mark Light Field • Coral Gables, FL	W 9–1	9–6	

March
Date	Opponent	Rank	Site/stadium	Score	Overall record	ACC record
Mar 3	Indiana*	No. 27	Mark Light Field • Coral Gables, FL	W 4–0	10–6	
Mar 4	Indiana*	No. 27	Mark Light Field • Coral Gables, FL	W 7–2	11–6	
Mar 5	Indiana*	No. 27	Mark Light Field • Coral Gables, FL	W 6–4	12–6	
Mar 8	Michigan State*	No. 21	Mark Light Field • Coral Gables, FL	W 9–4	13–6	
Mar 10	Virginia Tech	No. 21	Mark Light Field • Coral Gables, FL	W 14–3	14–6	1–0
Mar 11	Virginia Tech	No. 21	Mark Light Field • Coral Gables, FL	W 12–3	15–6	2–0
Mar 12	Virginia Tech	No. 21	Mark Light Field • Coral Gables, FL	W 10–4	16–6	3–0
Mar 14	Fordham*	No. 20	Mark Light Field • Coral Gables, FL	W 6–0	17–6	
Mar 15	Manhattan*	No. 20	Mark Light Field • Coral Gables, FL	W 12–2	18–6	
Mar 17	at Duke	No. 20	Jack Coombs Field • Durham, NC	W 3–0	19–6	4–0
Mar 18	at Duke	No. 20	Jack Coombs Field • Durham, NC	W 4–3	20–6	5–0
Mar 19	at Duke	No. 20	Jack Coombs Field • Durham, NC	W 7–1	21–6	6–0
Mar 24	at Maryland	No. 12	Bob "Turtle" Smith Stadium • College Park, MD	W 10–2	22–6	7–0
Mar 25	at Maryland	No. 12	Bob "Turtle" Smith Stadium • College Park, MD	L 4–5	22–7	7–1
Mar 26	at Maryland	No. 12	Bob "Turtle" Smith Stadium • College Park, MD	W 3–1	23–7	8–1
Mar 31	No. 9 Clemson	No. 11	Mark Light Field • Coral Gables, FL	L 6–8	23–8	8–2

April
Date	Opponent	Rank	Site/stadium	Score	Overall record	ACC record
Apr 1	No. 9 Clemson	No. 11	Mark Light Field • Coral Gables, FL	L 2–6	23–9	8–3
Apr 2	No. 9 Clemson	No. 11	Mark Light Field • Coral Gables, FL	L 1–14	23–10	8–4
Apr 7	No. 3 North Carolina	No. 14	Mark Light Field • Coral Gables, FL	L 7–8	23–11	8–5
Apr 8	No. 3 North Carolina	No. 14	Mark Light Field • Coral Gables, FL	W 9–7	24–11	9–5
Apr 9	No. 3 North Carolina	No. 14	Mark Light Field • Coral Gables, FL	L 6–9	24–12	9–6
Apr 14	at No. 3 Florida State	No. 14	Mike Martin Field at Dick Howser Stadium • Tallahassee, FL	W 7–3	25–12	10–6
Apr 15	at No. 3 Florida State	No. 14	Mike Martin Field at Dick Howser Stadium • Tallahassee, FL	L 1–16	25–13	10–7
Apr 16	at No. 3 Florida State	No. 14	Mike Martin Field at Dick Howser Stadium • Tallahassee, FL	W 7–5	26–13	11–7
Apr 21	No. 18 Virginia	No. 11	Mark Light Field • Coral Gables, FL	L 2–8	26–14	11–8
Apr 22	No. 18 Virginia	No. 11	Mark Light Field • Coral Gables, FL	L 7–15	26–15	11–9
Apr 23	No. 18 Virginia	No. 11	Mark Light Field • Coral Gables, FL	W 9–8^{10}	27–15	12–9
Apr 28	at No. 11 NC State	No. 17	Doak Field • Raleigh, NC	L 2–9	27–16	12–10
Apr 29	at No. 11 NC State	No. 17	Doak Field • Raleigh, NC	W 9–6	28–16	13–10
Apr 30	at No. 11 NC State	No. 17	Doak Field • Raleigh, NC	W 12–10	29–16	14–10

May
Date	Opponent	Rank	Site/stadium	Score	Overall record	ACC record
May 5	Wright State*	No. 16	Mark Light Field • Coral Gables, FL	W 5–2	30–16	
May 6	Wright State*	No. 16	Mark Light Field • Coral Gables, FL	W 14–1	31–16	
May 7	Wright State*	No. 16	Mark Light Field • Coral Gables, FL	W 15–1	32–16	
May 12	No. 19 Wake Forest	No. 17	Mark Light Field • Coral Gables, FL	W 13–1	33–16	15–10
May 13	No. 19 Wake Forest	No. 17	Mark Light Field • Coral Gables, FL	W 11–10^{10}	34–16	16–10
May 14	No. 19 Wake Forest	No. 17	Mark Light Field • Coral Gables, FL	L 5–8	34–17	16–11
May 18	at No. 17 Georgia Tech	No. 18	Russ Chandler Stadium • Atlanta, GA	W 8–7	35–17	17–11
May 19	at No. 17 Georgia Tech	No. 18	Russ Chandler Stadium • Atlanta, GA	L 5–14	35–18	17–12
May 20	at No. 17 Georgia Tech	No. 18	Russ Chandler Stadium • Atlanta, GA	L 7–12	35–19	17–13

Postseason

ACC Tournament
Date	Opponent	Seed	Site/stadium	Score	Overall record	ACCT Record
May 24	No. 16 (4) Georgia Tech	No. 20 (5)	Baseball Grounds of Jacksonville • Jacksonville, FL	L 1–2	35–20	0–1
May 25	No. 27 (8) Wake Forest	No. 20 (5)	Baseball Grounds of Jacksonville • Jacksonville, FL	W 4–1	36–20	1–1
May 26	No. 16 (4) Georgia Tech	No. 20 (5)	Baseball Grounds of Jacksonville • Jacksonville, FL	L 4–7	36–21	1–2

NCAA Lincoln Regional
Date	Opponent	Seed	Site/stadium	Score	Overall record	NCAAT record
June 2	(3) San Francisco	No. 21 (2)	Haymarket Park • Lincoln, NE	W 6–3	37–21	1–0
June 3	(4) Manhattan	No. 21 (2)	Haymarket Park • Lincoln, NE	W 1–0	38–21	2–0
June 4	(4) Manhattan	No. 21 (2)	Haymarket Park • Lincoln, NE	W 19–6	39–21	3–0

NCAA Oxford Super Regional
Date	Opponent	Seed	Site/stadium	Score	Overall record	SR Record
June 10	No. 9 Ole Miss	No. 11	Swayze Field • Oxford, MS	L 9–11	39–22	0–1
June 11	No. 9 Ole Miss	No. 11	Swayze Field • Oxford, MS	W 7–0	40–22	1–1
June 12	No. 9 Ole Miss	No. 11	Swayze Field • Oxford, MS	W 14–9	41–22	2–1

College World Series
Date	Opponent	Seed	Site/stadium	Score	Overall record	CWS record
June 17	No. 4 Oregon State	No. 8 (3)	Johnny Rosenblatt Stadium • Omaha, NE	W 11–1	42–22	1–0
June 19	No. 1 (2) Rice	No. 8 (3)	Johnny Rosenblatt Stadium • Omaha, NE	L 2–3	42–23	1–1
June 20	No. 4 Oregon State	No. 8 (3)	Johnny Rosenblatt Stadium • Omaha, NE	L 1–8	42–24	1–2
