= 2006 North Carolina Tar Heels baseball team =

American college baseball season

2006 North Carolina Tar Heels baseball

Chapel Hill Regional Champions Tuscaloosa Super Regional Champions

College World Series, Runner-Up
- Conference: Atlantic Coast Conference
- Coastal Division
- Record: 54–15 (22–8 ACC)
- Head coach: Mike Fox (6th season)
- Assistant coaches: Chad Holbrook (13th season); Scott Forbes (1st season); Jason Howell (1st season)
- Home stadium: Bryson Field at Boshamer Stadium

2006 Atlantic Coast Conference baseball standings
	Conf.				Overall
Team	W		L	PCT	W		L	PCT
Atlantic
No. 5 Clemson ^{x}‍‍‡‍^{y}	24	–	6	.800	53	–	16	.768
No. 24 Florida State ‍‍‍^{y}	16	–	13	.552	44	–	21	.677
No. 29 NC State ‍‍‍^{y}	16	–	13	.552	40	–	23	.635
Wake Forest ‍‍‍	16	–	13	.552	33	–	22	.600
Boston College ‍‍‍	9	–	21	.300	28	–	25	.528
Maryland ‍‍‍	8	–	22	.267	26	–	30	.464
Coastal
No. 2 North Carolina ^{x}‍‍‍^{y}	22	–	8	.733	54	–	15	.783
No. 20 Virginia ‍‍‍^{y}	21	–	9	.700	47	–	15	.758
No. 8 Georgia Tech ‍‍‍^{y}	19	–	11	.633	50	–	18	.735
No. 6 Miami (FL) ‍‍‍^{y}	17	–	13	.567	42	–	24	.636
Duke ‍‍‍	6	–	24	.200	15	–	40	.273
Virginia Tech ‍‍‍	4	–	25	.138	20	–	33	.377
x – Division champion ‡ – Tournament champion y – Invited to the NCAA tournament As of June 30, 2006; Rankings from Collegiate Baseball

The 2006 North Carolina Tar Heels baseball team represented the University of North Carolina in the 2006 NCAA Division I baseball season. The Tar Heels played their home games at the new Bryson Field at Boshamer Stadium. The team was coached by Mike Fox in his 6th season at North Carolina.

The Tar Heels lost the College World Series, defeated by the Oregon State Beavers in the championship series.

== Roster ==
2006 North Carolina Tar Heels roster
Pitchers: 25 Daniel Bard - Junior; 8 Andrew Carignan - Sophomore; 31 Matt Cox - Freshman; 17 Matt Danford - Junior; 18 Mike Facchinei - Sophomore; 29 Brian Farrell - Freshman; 15 Jonathan Hovis - Senior; 33 Andrew Miller - Junior; 39 Luke Putkonen - RS Freshman; 40 Tyler Trice - Sophomore; 28 Adam Warren - Freshman; 20 Robert Woodard - Junior; 35 Rob Wooten - Sophomore	Catchers: 19 Tim Federowicz - Freshman; 16 Matt Iannetta - Sophomore; 26 Benji Johnson - Sophomore; 38 Mike McKee - Freshman; Infielders: 34 Chad Flack - Sophomore; 7 Reid Fronk - Sophomore; 4 Garrett Gore - Freshman; 12 Josh Horton - Sophomore; 14 Joe Pietropaoli - Junior; 1 Kyle Shelton - Sophomore; 36 Matt Spencer - Sophomore; 3 Bryan Steed - Junior	Outfielders: 11 Mike Cavasinni - Freshman; 10 Jay Cox - Junior; 6 Nate Lape - Freshman; 5 Matt McNichol - Freshman; 27 Seth Williams - Sophomore

== Schedule and results ==
Legend
North Carolina win
North Carolina loss
North Carolina tie

2006 North Carolina Tar Heels baseball game log
Regular season (45–11)
February (7–0)

Date	Opponent	Site/stadium	Score	UNC Pitcher of Record	Attendance	Overall Record	ACC Record
February 17	Seton Hall	Boshamer Stadium • Chapel Hill, North Carolina	8–3	Woodard (1–0)	1,175	1–0	–
February 19	Seton Hall	Boshamer Stadium • Chapel Hill, North Carolina	9–7	Bard (1–0)	355	2–0	–
February 19	Seton Hall	Boshamer Stadium • Chapel Hill, North Carolina	21–2	Miller (1–0)	355	3–0	–
February 21	Coastal Carolina	Boshamer Stadium • Chapel Hill, North Carolina	15–0	Putkonen (1–0)	485	4–0	–
February 24	George Washington	Boshamer Stadium • Chapel Hill, North Carolina	11–7	Woodard (2–0)	1,251	5–0	–
February 25	George Washington	Boshamer Stadium • Chapel Hill, North Carolina	6–5	Hovis (1–0)	859	6–0	–
February 26	George Washington	Boshamer Stadium • Chapel Hill, North Carolina	14–0	Miller (2–0)	805	7–0	–

March (15–5)

Date	Opponent	Site/stadium	Score	UNC Pitcher of Record	Attendance	Overall Record	ACC Record
March 1	Gardner–Webb	Boshamer Stadium • Chapel Hill, North Carolina	11–8	Hovis (2–0)	759	8–0	–
March 3	Purdue	Boshamer Stadium • Chapel Hill, North Carolina	4–5	Hovis (2–1)	1,005	8–1	–
March 4	Purdue	Boshamer Stadium • Chapel Hill, North Carolina	5–2	Bard (2–0)	1,152	9–1	–
March 5	Purdue	Boshamer Stadium • Chapel Hill, North Carolina	7–3	Miller (3–0)	952	10–1	–
March 8	Appalachian State	Boshamer Stadium • Chapel Hill, North Carolina	6–4	Putkonen (2–0)	455	11–1	–
March 10	at Wake Forest	Ernie Shore Field • Winston-Salem, North Carolina	5–6	Danford (0–1)	413	11–2	0–1
March 11	at Wake Forest	Ernie Shore Field • Winston-Salem, North Carolina	3–0	Bard (3–0)	919	12–2	1–1
March 12	at Wake Forest	Ernie Shore Field • Winston-Salem, North Carolina	5–1	Miller (4–0)	1,501	13–2	2–1
March 14	George Mason	Boshamer Stadium • Chapel Hill, North Carolina	9–5	Danford (1–1)	115	14–2	2–1
March 15	George Mason	Boshamer Stadium • Chapel Hill, North Carolina	7–4	Hovis (3–1)	205	15–2	2–1
March 17	Maryland	Boshamer Stadium • Chapel Hill, North Carolina	8–15	Bard (3–1)	853	15–3	2–2
March 18	Maryland	Boshamer Stadium • Chapel Hill, North Carolina	11–7	Hovis (4–1)	1,125	16–3	3–2
March 19	Maryland	Boshamer Stadium • Chapel Hill, North Carolina	10–3	Danford (2–1)	1,050	17–3	4–2
March 21	Towson	Boshamer Stadium • Chapel Hill, North Carolina	11–2	Warren (1–0)	105	18–3	4–2
March 22	Towson	Boshamer Stadium • Chapel Hill, North Carolina	11–3	Putkonen (3–0)	353	19–3	4–2
March 24	at Georgia Tech	Russ Chandler Stadium • Atlanta, Georgia	2–0	Miller (5–0)	1,243	20–3	5–2
March 25	at Georgia Tech	Russ Chandler Stadium • Atlanta, Georgia	1–11	Bard (3–2)	1,397	20–4	5–3
March 26	at Georgia Tech	Russ Chandler Stadium • Atlanta, Georgia	2–3	Woodard (2–1)	2,201	20–5	5–4
March 28	Charlotte	Boshamer Stadium • Chapel Hill, North Carolina	3–1	Hovis (5–1)	665	21–5	5–4
March 31	Florida State	Boshamer Stadium • Chapel Hill, North Carolina	4–0	Miller (6–0)	2,555	22–5	6–4

April (17–3)

Date	Opponent	Site/stadium	Score	UNC Pitcher of Record	Attendance	Overall Record	ACC Record
April 1	Florida State	Boshamer Stadium • Chapel Hill, North Carolina	4–3	Woodard (3–1)	2,151	23–5	7–4
April 2	Florida State	Boshamer Stadium • Chapel Hill, North Carolina	5–6	Hovis (5–2)	2,395	23–6	7–5
April 4	Elon	Boshamer Stadium • Chapel Hill, North Carolina	9–1	Putkonen (4–0)	959	24–6	7–5
April 5	Davidson	Boshamer Stadium • Chapel Hill, North Carolina	23–7	Banford (3–1)	599	25–6	7–5
April 7	at Miami (FL)	Mark Light Field • Coral Gables, Florida	8–7	Miller (7–0)	2,216	26–6	8–5
April 8	at Miami (FL)	Mark Light Field • Coral Gables, Florida	7–9	Carignan (1–0)	2,203	26–7	8–6
April 9	at Miami (FL)	Mark Light Field • Coral Gables, Florida	9–6	Hovis (6–2)	1,385	27–7	9–6
April 12	at Charlotte	Tom and Lib Phillips Field • Charlotte, North Carolina	3–1	Danford (4–1)	3,134	28–7	9–6
April 14	Virginia Tech	Boshamer Stadium • Chapel Hill, North Carolina	9–4	Miller (8–0)	2,325	29–7	10–6
April 15	Virginia Tech	Boshamer Stadium • Chapel Hill, North Carolina	3–1	Woodard (4–1)	2,351	30–7	11–6
April 16	Virginia Tech	Boshamer Stadium • Chapel Hill, North Carolina	12–4	Bard (4–2)	1,355	31–7	12–6
April 18	at UNC Greensboro	UNCG Baseball Stadium • Greensboro, North Carolina	6–7	Facchinei (0–1)	1,033	31–8	12–6
April 21	NC State	Boshamer Stadium • Chapel Hill, North Carolina	7–3	Miller (9–0)	3,656	32–8	13–6
April 22	NC State	Boshamer Stadium • Chapel Hill, North Carolina	3–2	Carignan (1–1)	2,195	33–8	14–6
April 23	NC State	Boshamer Stadium • Chapel Hill, North Carolina	4–0	Bard (5–2)	3,153	34–8	15–6
April 25	VCU	Boshamer Stadium • Chapel Hill, North Carolina	6–3	Putkonen (9–0)	557	35–8	15–6
April 26	High Point	Boshamer Stadium • Chapel Hill, North Carolina	7–3	Trice (1–0)	105	36–8	15–6
April 28	at Duke	Jack Coombs Field • Durham, North Carolina	8–4	Miller (10–0)	1,927	37–8	16–6
April 29	at Duke	Jack Coombs Field • Durham, North Carolina	8–2	Woodard (5–1)	1,555	38–8	17–6
April 30	at Duke	Jack Coombs Field • Durham, North Carolina	7–1	Bard (6–2)	1,032	39–8	18–6

May (7–2)

Date	Opponent	Site/stadium	Score	UNC Pitcher of Record	Attendance	Overall Record	ACC Record
May 9	Campbell	Boshamer Stadium • Chapel Hill, North Carolina	6–3	Danford (5–1)	715	40–8	18–6
May 10	Winthrop	Boshamer Stadium • Chapel Hill, North Carolina	8–12	Carignan (1–2)	757	40–9	18–6
May 12	at Virginia	Davenport Field at UVA Baseball Stadium • Charlottesville, Virginia	1–4	Miller (10–1)	2,624	40–10	18–7
May 13	at Virginia	Davenport Field at UVA Baseball Stadium • Charlottesville, Virginia	5–0	Woodard (6–1)	2,624	41–10	19–7
May 14	at Virginia	Davenport Field at UVA Baseball Stadium • Charlottesville, Virginia	2–9	Bard (6–3)	2,119	41–11	19–8
May 16	UNC Greensboro	Boshamer Stadium • Chapel Hill, North Carolina	7–0	Putkonen (6–0)	858	42–11	19–8
May 18	Boston College	Boshamer Stadium • Chapel Hill, North Carolina	7–1	Miller (11–1)	255	43–11	20–8
May 19	Boston College	Boshamer Stadium • Chapel Hill, North Carolina	5–2	Hovis (7–2)	1,915	44–11	21–8
May 20	Boston College	Boshamer Stadium • Chapel Hill, North Carolina	5–1	Bard (7–3)	2,158	45–11	22–8

Postseason (9–4)
ACC Tournament (0–2)

Date	Opponent	Site/stadium	Score	UNC Pitcher of Record	Attendance	Overall Record	ACC Record
May 24	vs NC State	Baseball Grounds of Jacksonville • Jacksonville, Florida	3–9	Miller (11–2)	16,444	45–12	22–8
May 25	vs Florida State	Baseball Grounds of Jacksonville • Jacksonville, Florida	6–7	Carignan (1–3)	17,236	45–13	22–8

Chapel Hill Regional (3–0)

Date	Opponent	Site/stadium	Score	UNC Pitcher of Record	Attendance	Overall Record	ACC Record
June 2	Maine	Boshamer Stadium • Chapel Hill, North Carolina	15–7	Danford (6–1)	1,815	46–13	22–8
June 3	Winthrop	Boshamer Stadium • Chapel Hill, North Carolina	14–4	Miller (12–2)	2,915	47–13	22–8
June 4	Winthrop	Boshamer Stadium • Chapel Hill, North Carolina	14–2	Bard (8–3)	2,857	48–13	22–8

Tuscaloosa Super Regional (2–0)

Date	Opponent	Site/stadium	Score	UNC Pitcher of Record	Attendance	Overall Record	ACC Record
June 9	at Alabama	Sewell–Thomas Stadium • Tuscaloosa, Alabama	11–5	Miller (13–2)	5,240	49–13	22–8
June 10	at Alabama	Sewell–Thomas Stadium • Tuscaloosa, Alabama	8–7	Carignan (2–3)	5,420	50–13	22–8

2006 College World Series (4–2)

Date	Opponent	Site/stadium	Score	UNC Pitcher of Record	Attendance	Overall Record	ACC Record
June 16	vs Cal State Fullerton	Johnny Rosenblatt Stadium • Omaha, Nebraska	7–5	Danford (7–1)	23,385	51–13	22–8
June 18	vs Clemson	Johnny Rosenblatt Stadium • Omaha, Nebraska	2–0	Woodard (7–1)	21,329	52–13	22–8
June 21	vs Cal State Fullerton	Johnny Rosenblatt Stadium • Omaha, Nebraska	6–5	Bard (9–3)	17,000	53–13	22–8
June 24	vs Oregon State	Johnny Rosenblatt Stadium • Omaha, Nebraska	4–3	Hovis (8–2)	26,808	54–13	22–8
June 25	vs Oregon State	Johnny Rosenblatt Stadium • Omaha, Nebraska	7–11	Danford (7–2)	25,046	54–14	22–8
June 26	vs Oregon State	Johnny Rosenblatt Stadium • Omaha, Nebraska	2–3	Bard (9–4)	18,565	54–15	22–8

Schedule Source:

== Awards and honors ==
Tim Federowicz

- All Tournament Team

Jay Cox

- All Tournament Team

== Tar Heels in the 2006 MLB draft ==
The following members of the North Carolina Tar Heels baseball program were drafted in the 2006 Major League Baseball draft.

Round	Pick	Player	Position	MLB Club
1	6	Andrew Miller	P	Detroit Tigers
1	28	Daniel Bard	P	Boston Red Sox
22	648	Jay Cox	OF	Colorado Rockies
46	1,390	Robert Woodard	P	St. Louis Cardinals
