= Dallas Buck =

American baseball player (born 1984)

- Pitcher
- Born: November 11, 1984 (age 41); Newberg, Oregon, U.S.
- Bats: Right Throws: Right

Dallas Buck (born November 11, 1984) is an American former Minor League Baseball player and All-American pitcher. He played for the Oregon State Beavers of Oregon State University in college. He threw a fastball, changeup, curveball, and his strike-out pitch, the slider.

== College career ==
Buck pitched four years for Newberg High School, which won the Oregon state championship his senior year. At Oregon State University, the 6 ft 3 in (1.91 m), 210 pound, athlete majored in sociology. He played football in the Fall as a defensive-back and pitched for the baseball team in the Spring. After two years playing both sports, he decided to specialize in baseball.

Buck pitched for the Beavers from 2004 to 2006, including pitching games in the 2006 College World Series. In 2005, Dallas Buck and Oregon State teammate, outfielder Jacoby Ellsbury, were All-American candidates. In 2004 and 2005, he played collegiate summer baseball for the Falmouth Commodores of the Cape Cod Baseball League, and won West Division MVP at the league's 2004 all-star game. He had a key part in the 2006 championship series between Oregon State and the North Carolina Tar Heels. Buck won game three of the series after pitching just two days before in game one, sealing Oregon State's first baseball national championship. He finished his career at Oregon State as the school's leader in hit batters.

=== College honors ===
- 2005 American Baseball Coaches Association All-American (first team)
- 2005 Baseball America All-American (first team)
- 2005 Louisville Slugger/Collegiate Baseball All-American (first team)
- 2005 USA Today/Sports Weekly All-American (first team)
- 2005 National Collegiate Baseball Writers Association All-American (second team)
- 2005 ABCA All-West Region first team
- 2005 All-Pacific-10 first team

== Professional career ==
=== Arizona Diamondbacks ===
Buck was a third round pick for the Arizona Diamondbacks in the 2006 First-Year Player Draft. In June 2007, he had Tommy John surgery on his elbow.

=== Cincinnati Reds ===
On August 11, 2008, Buck was traded from Arizona's minor league Single-A Visalia Oaks (along with Micah Owings and Wilkin Castillo) to the Cincinnati Reds for Adam Dunn and cash. In 2009 Buck battled arm injuries while holding a 2–3 record with a 4.91 ERA in ten starts. He ended the 2009 season playing for the Double-A Carolina Mudcats. Buck played on the Mudcats through 2011. After posting a 1–5 record in eight starts for the Mudcats in 2011, he was released.

During his five seasons in the minor leagues, Buck finished with a 16–22 record in 61 starts and a 4.48 ERA. Buck also held a .244 batting average in 41 at bats, despite not having any plate appearances at Oregon State.
