= 2006 Cal State Fullerton Titans baseball team =

American college baseball season

2006 Cal State Fullerton Titans baseball

NCAA Fullerton Super Regional champions NCAA Fullerton Regional champions Big West Conference champions

College World Series, 2–2
- Conference: Big West Conference
- Record: 50–15 (18–3 Big West)
- Head coach: George Horton (10th year)
- Home stadium: Goodwin Field

2006 Big West Conference baseball standings
	Conf.				Overall
Team	W		L	PCT	W		L	PCT
No. 4 Cal State Fullerton ‍†‍‍^{y}	18	–	3	.857	50	–	15	.769
Long Beach State ‍‍‍	12	–	9	.571	29	–	27	.518
UC Irvine ‍‍‍^{y}	11	–	10	.524	36	–	24	.600
Cal Poly ‍‍‍	10	–	11	.476	29	–	27	.518
Pacific ‍‍‍	9	–	12	.429	30	–	25	.545
UC Riverside ‍‍‍	9	–	12	.429	29	–	25	.537
UC Santa Barbara ‍‍‍	9	–	12	.429	26	–	28	.481
Cal State Northridge ‍‍‍	6	–	15	.286	26	–	30	.464
UC Davis ‍‍‍	0	–	0	–	18	–	34	.346
† – Conference champion y – Invited to the NCAA tournament As of June 30, 2006; Rankings from Collegiate Baseball

The 2006 Cal State Fullerton Titans baseball team represented California State University, Fullerton in the 2006 NCAA Division I baseball season. The Titans played their home games at Goodwin Field, and played as part of the Big West Conference. The team was coached by George Horton in his tenth season as head coach at Cal State Fullerton.

The Titans reached the College World Series, their fourteenth appearance in Omaha, where they finished in fourth place after winning a game each against Georgia Tech and Clemson and losing a pair of games, one in the opening round and one in the semifinal, to eventual runner-up North Carolina.

== Personnel ==
=== Roster ===
2006 Cal State Fullerton Titans roster
Pitchers: 10 - Jared Clark - Sophomore; 18 - Dave Pherrin - Senior; 22 - Jeff Soulages - Sophomore; 24 - Wes Roemer - Sophomore; 26 - Chris Jones - Sophomore; 30 - Cory Arbiso - Freshman; 31 - Adam Jorgenson - Sophomore; 33 - Nolan Bruyninckx - Junior; 34 - Lauren Gagnier - Junior; 36 - Justin Klipp - Junior; 38 - Dustin Miller - Senior; 40 - Mike Anderson - Freshman; 45 - Brian Stevens - Sophomore; 50 - John Estes - Senior; 51 - Ryan Paul - Junior; 52 - Sean Urena - Freshman; 53 - Vinnie Pestano - Junior	Catchers: 5 - Cory Vanderhook - Senior; 23 - Dustin Garneau - Freshman; 32 - Jon Wilhite - Sophomore; 35 - John Curtis - Junior; 43 - Eric Echevarria - Senior; 46 - Billy Marcoe - Freshman; Outfielders: 1 - Joe Turgeon - Senior; 4 - Clark Hardman - Sophomore; 13 - Matthew Fahey - Freshman; 20 - Brandon Tripp - Junior; 27 - Danny Dorn - Senior; 37 - Dennis Gerbasi - Freshman	Infielders: 2 - Justin Turner - Senior; 3 - Blake Davis - Junior; 9 - Brett Pill - Junior; 15 - Bryan Harris - Junior; 17 - David Cooper - Freshman; 19 - Evan McArthur - Junior; 25 - Justin McClure - Junior; 41 - Joe Scott - Freshman; 42 - Billy Pinkerton - Freshman

=== Coaches ===
2006 Cal State Fullerton Titans baseball coaching staff
- 8 - George Horton - Head coach - 10th Season
- 6 - Jason Gill - Assistant coach/Recruiting coordinator - 2nd Season
- 28 - Rick Vanderhook - Assistant coach - 20th Season
- 12 - Ted Silva - Assistant coach - 2nd Season

== Schedule and results ==
Legend
Cal State Fullerton win
Cal State Fullerton loss

2006 Cal State Fullerton Titans baseball game log
Regular season

February
Date	Opponent	Rank	Site/Stadium	Score	Overall Record	Big West Record
Feb 3	at Stanford*	No. 5	Klein Field at Sunken Diamond • Stanford, CA	L 1–2	0–1	
Feb 4	at Stanford*	No. 5	Klein Field at Sunken Diamond • Stanford, CA	L 5–6^{10}	0–2	
Feb 5	at Stanford*	No. 5	Klein Field at Sunken Diamond • Stanford, CA	L 3–6	0–3	
Feb 10	UNLV*	No. 9	Goodwin Field • Fullerton, CA	W 9–1	1–3	
Feb 11	UNLV*	No. 9	Goodwin Field • Fullerton, CA	W 13–4	2–3	
Feb 12	UNLV*	No. 9	Goodwin Field • Fullerton, CA	W 3–1	3–3	
Feb 17	at UC Irvine*	No. 9	Anteater Ballpark • Irvine, CA	W 13–7	4–3	
Feb 18	UC Irvine*	No. 9	Goodwin Field • Fullerton, CA	W 5–2	5–3	
Feb 19	UC Irvine*	No. 9	Goodwin Field • Fullerton, CA	L 4–7	5–4	
Feb 24	at UCLA*	No. 9	Jackie Robinson Stadium • Los Angeles, CA	W 7–2	6–4	
Feb 25	UCLA*	No. 9	Goodwin Field • Fullerton, CA	W 3–1	7–4	
Feb 26	UCLA*	No. 9	Goodwin Field • Fullerton, CA	W 12–6	8–4	
Feb 28	at No. 12 Pepperdine*	No. 7	Eddy D. Field Stadium • Malibu, CA	W 5–0	9–4	

March
Date	Opponent	Rank	Site/Stadium	Score	Overall Record	Big West Record
Mar 3	at No. 4 Rice*	No. 7	Reckling Park • Houston, TX	L 2–3^{10}	9–5	
Mar 4	at No. 4 Rice*	No. 7	Reckling Park • Houston, TX	L 2–6	9–6	
Mar 5	at No. 4 Rice*	No. 7	Reckling Park • Houston, TX	W 15–4	10–6	
Mar 7	San Diego State*	No. 7	Goodwin Field • Fullerton, CA	W 10–5	11–6	
Mar 10	East Carolina*	No. 7	Goodwin Field • Fullerton, CA	W 5–0	12–6	
Mar 11	East Carolina*	No. 7	Goodwin Field • Fullerton, CA	W 8–0	13–6	
Mar 12	East Carolina*	No. 7	Goodwin Field • Fullerton, CA	W 8–1	14–6	
Mar 17	at Arizona*	No. 7	Jerry Kindall Field at Frank Sancet Stadium • Tucson, AZ	W 6–4	15–6	
Mar 18	at Arizona*	No. 7	Jerry Kindall Field at Frank Sancet Stadium • Tucson, AZ	W 5–3	16–6	
Mar 19	at Arizona*	No. 7	Jerry Kindall Field at Frank Sancet Stadium • Tucson, AZ	W 5–3	17–6	
Mar 21	No. 21 Pepperdine*	No. 4	Goodwin Field • Fullerton, CA	L 4–7	17–7	
Mar 24	Long Beach State*	No. 4	Goodwin Field • Fullerton, CA	W 2–1^{11}	18–7	
Mar 25	Long Beach State*	No. 4	Goodwin Field • Fullerton, CA	W 7–4	19–7	
Mar 26	Long Beach State*	No. 4	Goodwin Field • Fullerton, CA	W 6–2	20–7	
Mar 28	at Loyola Marymount*	No. 2	George C. Page Stadium • Los Angeles, CA	W 8–4	21–7	
Mar 31	Cal State Northridge	No. 2	Goodwin Field • Fullerton, CA	W 2–1	22–7	1–0

April
Date	Opponent	Rank	Site/Stadium	Score	Overall Record	Big West Record
Apr 1	Cal State Northridge	No. 2	Goodwin Field • Fullerton, CA	W 6–1	23–7	2–0
Apr 2	Cal State Northridge	No. 2	Goodwin Field • Fullerton, CA	W 14–2	24–7	3–0
Apr 7	at UC Irvine	No. 1	Anteater Ballpark • Irvine, CA	W 7–0	25–7	4–0
Apr 8	at UC Irvine	No. 1	Anteater Ballpark • Irvine, CA	L 0–2	25–8	4–1
Apr 9	at UC Irvine	No. 1	Anteater Ballpark • Irvine, CA	W 8–4	26–8	5–1
Apr 13	UC Davis*	No. 1	Goodwin Field • Fullerton, CA	L 1–2	26–9	
Apr 14	UC Davis*	No. 1	Goodwin Field • Fullerton, CA	W 11–2	27–9	
Apr 15	UC Davis*	No. 1	Goodwin Field • Fullerton, CA	W 8–1	28–9	
Apr 18	Loyola Marymount*	No. 1	Goodwin Field • Fullerton, CA	L 4–8	28–10	
Apr 21	at Pacific	No. 1	Klein Family Field • Stockton, CA	W 8–1	29–10	6–1
Apr 22	at Pacific	No. 1	Klein Family Field • Stockton, CA	W 11–1	30–10	7–1
Apr 23	at Pacific	No. 1	Klein Family Field • Stockton, CA	W 8–4	31–10	8–1
Apr 28	UC Riverside	No. 1	Goodwin Field • Fullerton, CA	L 7–9^{11}	31–11	8–2
Apr 29	UC Riverside	No. 1	Goodwin Field • Fullerton, CA	W 11–3	32–11	9–2
Apr 30	UC Riverside	No. 1	Goodwin Field • Fullerton, CA	W 11–3	33–11	10–2

May
Date	Opponent	Rank	Site/Stadium	Score	Overall Record	Big West Record
May 5	at UC Santa Barbara	No. 4	Caesar Uyesaka Stadium • Santa Barbara, CA	W 5–3	34–11	11–2
May 6	at UC Santa Barbara	No. 4	Caesar Uyesaka Stadium • Santa Barbara, CA	L 2–8	34–12	11–3
May 7	at UC Santa Barbara	No. 4	Caesar Uyesaka Stadium • Santa Barbara, CA	W 7–5	35–12	12–3
May 10	USC	No. 3	Goodwin Field • Fullerton, CA	W 7–6	36–12	
May 16	at San Diego State*	No. 2	Tony Gwynn Stadium • San Diego, CA	L 8–9	36–13	
May 19	Cal Poly	No. 2	Goodwin Field • Fullerton, CA	W 6–4	37–13	13–3
May 20	Cal Poly	No. 2	Goodwin Field • Fullerton, CA	W 3–1	38–13	14–3
May 21	Cal Poly	No. 2	Goodwin Field • Fullerton, CA	W 1–0	39–13	15–3
May 23	at USC*	No. 2	Dedeaux Field • Los Angeles, CA	W 7–6	40–13	
May 26	at Long Beach State	No. 2	Blair Field • Long Beach, CA	W 2–0	41–13	16–3
May 27	at Long Beach State	No. 2	Blair Field • Long Beach, CA	W 10–2	42–13	17–3
May 28	at Long Beach State	No. 2	Blair Field • Long Beach, CA	W 13–3	43–13	18–3

Postseason

NCAA Fullerton Regional
Date	Opponent	Rank/Seed	Site/Stadium	Score	Overall Record	Reg Record
June 2	(4) Saint Louis	No. 2 (1)	Goodwin Field • Fullerton, CA	W 6–1	44–13	1–0
June 3	No. 22 (2) Fresno State	No. 2 (1)	Goodwin Field • Fullerton, CA	W 9–2	45–13	2–0
June 4	No. 22 (2) Fresno State	No. 2 (1)	Goodwin Field • Fullerton, CA	W 10–3	46–13	3–0

NCAA Fullerton Super Regional
Date	Opponent	Rank/Seed	Site/Stadium	Score	Overall Record	SR Record
June 9	No. 18 Missouri	No. 2 (5)	Goodwin Field • Fullerton, CA	W 7–1	47–13	1–0
June 10	No. 18 Missouri	No. 2 (5)	Goodwin Field • Fullerton, CA	W 9–1	48–13	2–0

College World Series
Date	Opponent	Rank/Seed	Site/Stadium	Score	Overall Record	CWS Record
June 16	No. 5 North Carolina	No. 2 (5)	Johnny Rosenblatt Stadium • Omaha, NE	L 5–7	48–14	0–1
June 18	No. 7 (8) Georgia Tech	No. 2 (5)	Johnny Rosenblatt Stadium • Omaha, NE	W 7–5	49–14	1–1
June 20	No. 3 (1) Clemson	No. 2 (5)	Johnny Rosenblatt Stadium • Omaha, NE	W 7–6	50–14	2–1
June 21	No. 5 North Carolina	No. 2 (5)	Johnny Rosenblatt Stadium • Omaha, NE	L 5–6	50–15	2–2

== Rankings ==
Ranking movements Legend: ██ Increase in ranking ██ Decrease in ranking
	Week																				
Poll	Pre	1	2	3	4	5	6	7	8	9	10	11	12	13	14	15	16	17	18	19	Final
Coaches'		*																			4
Baseball America	5	9	9	9	7	7	7	4	2	1	1	1	1	4	3	2	2	2	2	2	3
Collegiate Baseball^	9	15	12	14	13	14	13	8	6	2	1	2	2	4	3	2	2	2	2	2	4
NCBWA†	8	15	12	13	13	16	16	9	8	6	5	4	4	4	3	3	3	3	3	3	4

^ Collegiate Baseball ranked 40 teams in their preseason poll, but only ranked 30 teams weekly during the season.
† NCBWA ranks 30 teams in their preseason poll, but only ranks 25 teams weekly during the season.
* A new poll was not released for this week, so for comparison purposes, the previous week's ranking is inserted in this week's slot.
