= Jonah Nickerson =

American baseball player

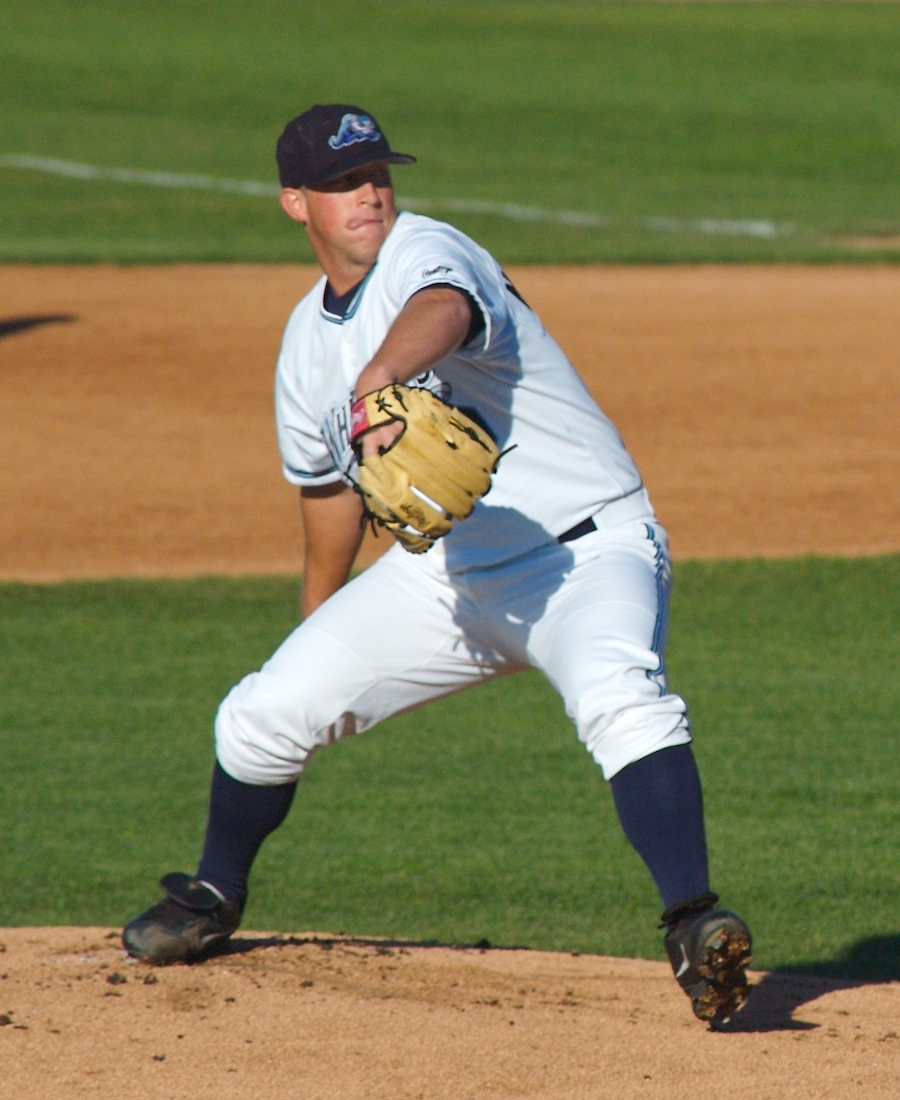
- Nickerson pitching for the West Michigan Whitecaps in 2007
- Pitcher
- Born: March 9, 1985 (age 40); Casper, Wyoming, U.S.
- Bats: Right Throws: Right

Career highlights and awards
- College World Series Most Outstanding Player (2005)

Jonah S. Nickerson (born March 9, 1985) is an American former professional baseball pitcher. Nickerson won the 2006 College World Series while playing for the Oregon State Beavers and was named the tournament's Most Outstanding Player.

== Early life ==
Although born in Wyoming, Nickerson grew up in Oregon City, Oregon, and played prep baseball there. He lettered 3 times in baseball and held a successful career at Oregon City. He graduated from Oregon City High School in 2003. At a local rally in Oregon City on July 7, 2006, Nickerson was honored with the keys to the city by Mayor Alice Norris, who also proclaimed July 7 as "Jonah Nickerson Day".

== College career ==
A 6'1", 190 lb right-hander, Nickerson posted a record of 13–4 during the 2006 season, including three games (two victories and one no-decision) during the College World Series; one of them, a victory against Rice University which qualified the Beavers for the Finals, came on two days' rest. His earned run average (ERA) for the regular season was 2.50. He was named an All-American in both 2005 and 2006.

== Professional career ==
Jonah was selected by the Detroit Tigers in the 7th round of the 2006 Major League Baseball draft. In 2006, he made five appearances with the short season Class A Oneonta Tigers of the New York–Penn League. During the 2009 season he was a starting pitcher for the Tigers Class AA affiliate Erie SeaWolves of the Eastern League.

On March 11, 2010, Nickerson retired from baseball.

Currently pitches for Texas Blacksox 8U in Aledo, TX.
