= 2006 NCAA Division I baseball tournament =

American college baseball tournament

- Season: 2006
- Teams: 64
- Finals site: Johnny Rosenblatt Stadium; Omaha, NE
- Champions: Oregon State (1st title)
- Runner-up: North Carolina (5th CWS Appearance)
- Winning coach: Pat Casey (1st title)
- MOP: Jonah Nickerson (Oregon State)

The 2006 NCAA Division I baseball tournament was held from June 2 through June 26, 2006. Sixty-four NCAA Division I college baseball teams met after having played their way through a regular season, and for some, a conference tournament, to play in the NCAA tournament. The tournament culminated with 8 teams in the College World Series at historic Rosenblatt Stadium in Omaha, Nebraska.

After winning the regional and super regional rounds of the 2006 NCAA Division I baseball tournament, eight teams advanced to Omaha. Clemson, Georgia Tech, North Carolina, Cal State Fullerton, Oregon State, Rice, Georgia, and Miami (FL) all won their super-regionals and made the trip to the 2006 College World Series. Five national seeds advanced to Omaha: Clemson (1), Rice (2), Cal State Fullerton (5), Georgia (7), and Georgia Tech (8). Third-seeded Texas and sixth-seeded Nebraska both fell in the regionals, while the fourth seed Alabama lost in super regional play.

The first pitch of the 2006 CWS was Friday, June 16, at 1:00 PM CDT (18:00 UTC). The 2006 tournament was only the second time in CWS history in which 16 games were played (the other being the 2003 College World Series).

After losing their tournament opener to Miami (FL), the Oregon State Beavers staved off elimination for four straight games to win their bracket and advance to the championship series. The Rice Owls, who had not lost a three-game series all season, were shut out in consecutive games by the Beavers and failed to score in a CWS-record 23 innings. Oregon State advanced to face North Carolina in the final.

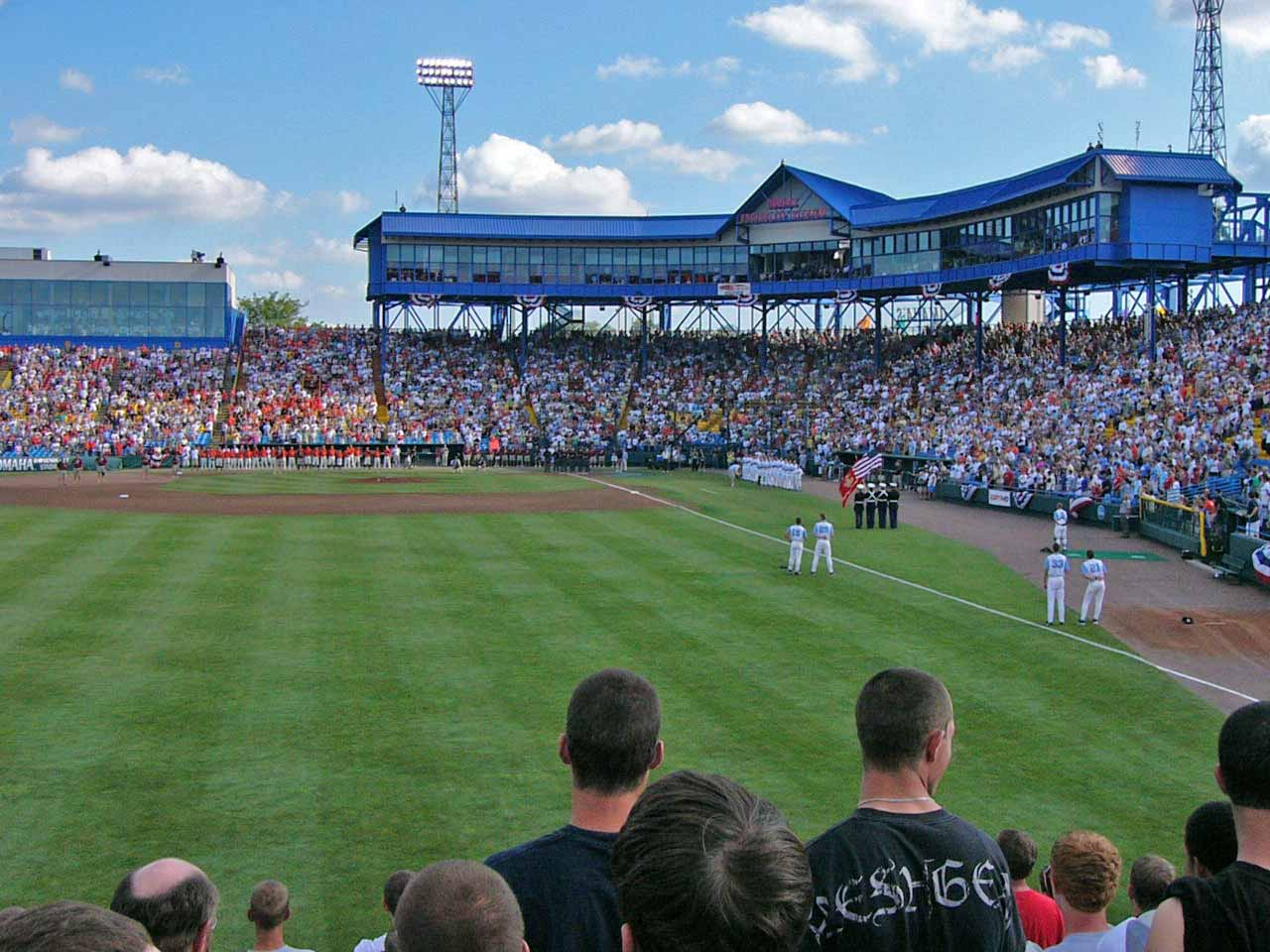
Opening ceremony of game 2 between Oregon State and North Carolina.

The best-of-three championship series featured Oregon State and North Carolina. Oregon State won the deciding game, 3–2, winning the school's first national title in baseball and its second NCAA championship overall. All games were televised on ESPN and ESPN2.

Oregon State set a CWS record by winning six elimination games (four in bracket play, two in the championship series) and also became the first team ever to lose twice in Omaha and still win the title. Oregon State is the only team besides Holy Cross in 1952 to win six games in the College World Series. Oregon State played in half (eight of 16) of the games in the tournament.

OSU pitcher Jonah Nickerson was named the tournament's Most Outstanding Player.

Five-time national champion LSU was left out of the field of 64, the first time since 1988 that the Tigers failed to qualify for a regional. LSU's overall record of 35–24 merited at-large consideration, but it was undone by poor performance in the Southeastern Conference, where the Tigers finished eighth out of 12 teams at 13–17 (followed by a 1-2 showing in the SEC Tournament). LSU won national championships in 1991, '93, '96, '97 and 2000 under Hall of Fame coach Skip Bertman, who was the school's athletic director at this time. Ten days after LSU's season ended, Bertman fired his successor, Smoke Laval, and hired Notre Dame coach Paul Mainieri. Prior to this season, LSU hosted a regional every year since 1990.

== Bids ==
=== Automatic bids ===
Conference champions from 30 Division I conferences earned automatic bids to regionals. The remaining 34 spots were awarded to schools as at-large invitees.

Conference	School	Berth type
America East	Maine	Tournament champion
ACC	Clemson	Tournament champion
Atlantic Sun	Stetson	Tournament champion
A-10	Saint Louis	Tournament champion
Big 12	Kansas	Tournament champion
Big East	Notre Dame	Tournament champion
Big South	UNC Asheville	Tournament champion
Big Ten	Michigan	Tournament champion
Big West	Cal State Fullerton	Regular-season champion
CAA	UNC Wilmington	Tournament champion
Conference USA	Rice	Tournament champion
Horizon League	Wright State	Tournament champion
Ivy League	Princeton	Championship series winner
MAAC	Manhattan	Tournament champion
MAC	Ball State	Tournament champion
Mid-Con	Oral Roberts	Tournament champion
MEAC	Bethune-Cookman	Tournament champion
Missouri Valley	Evansville	Tournament champion
MWC	TCU	Tournament champion
NEC	Sacred Heart	Tournament champion
OVC	Jacksonville State	Tournament champion
Pac-10	Oregon State	Regular-season champion
Patriot League	Lehigh	Tournament champion
SEC	Ole Miss	Tournament champion
SoCon	College of Charleston	Tournament champion
Southland	Texas–Arlington	Tournament champion
SWAC	Prairie View A&M	Tournament champion
Sun Belt	Troy	Tournament champion
WCC	Pepperdine	Championship series winner
WAC	Fresno State	Tournament champion

=== Bids by conference ===
Conference	Total	Schools
Southeastern	8	Alabama, Arkansas, Georgia, Kentucky, Ole Miss, Mississippi State, South Carolina, Vanderbilt
Atlantic Coast	7	Clemson, Florida State, Georgia Tech, Miami (FL), North Carolina, NC State, Virginia
Big 12	7	Baylor, Kansas, Missouri, Nebraska, Oklahoma, Oklahoma State, Texas
Conference USA	4	Houston, Rice, Southern Miss, Tulane
Pacific-10	4	Arizona State, Oregon State, Stanford, UCLA
WCC	3	Pepperdine, San Diego. San Francisco
Atlantic Sun	2	Jacksonville, Stetson
Big South	2	UNC Asheville, Winthrop
Big West	2	UC Irvine, Cal State Fullerton
Missouri Valley	2	Evansville, Wichita State
Southern	2	College of Charleston, Elon
Sun Belt	2	South Alabama, Troy
Western Athletic	2	Fresno State, Hawaii
America East	1	Maine
Atlantic 10	1	Saint Louis
Big East	1	Notre Dame
Big Ten	1	Michigan
Colonial	1	UNC Wilmington
Horizon	1	Wright State
Ivy	1	Princeton
Metro Atlantic	1	Manhattan
Mid-American	1	Ball State
Mid-Con	1	Oral Roberts
Mid-Eastern	1	Bethune Cookman
Mountain West	1	TCU
Northeast	1	Sacred Heart
Ohio Valley	1	Jacksonville State
Patriot	1	Lehigh
Southland	1	Texas–Arlington
Southwestern	1	Prairie View

== National seeds ==
Bold indicates CWS participant.

1. **Clemson**
2. **Rice**
3. Texas
4. Alabama
5. **Cal State Fullerton**
6. Nebraska
7. **Georgia**
8. **Georgia Tech**

== Regionals and super regionals ==
Bold indicates winner.

=== Clemson Super Regional ===
First round	Second round
1	**Clemson**	**3**
4	UNC Asheville	0
1	**Clemson**	**13**
2	Elon	3
3	Mississippi State	4
2	**Elon**	**5**
Clemson Regional–Doug Kingsmore Stadium
4	UNC Asheville	4
3	**Mississippi State**	**5**
3	**Mississippi State**	**12**
2	Elon	3
1	**Oklahoma State**	**4**
4	Princeton	1
1	Oklahoma State	4
3	**Oral Roberts**	**5**
3	**Oral Roberts**	**4**^{11}
2	Arkansas	3
Fayetteville Regional–Baum Stadium
4	Princeton	2
2	**Arkansas**	**6**
2	Arkansas	5
1	**Oklahoma State**	**6**

Regional finals
**1**	**Clemson**	**8**	—
3	Mississippi State	6	—
3	**Oral Roberts**	**9**	—
1	Oklahoma State	2	—

Super regionals
1	**Clemson**	**11**	**6**	—
Oral Roberts	8	5	—

=== Houston Super Regional ===
First round	Second round
1	**Rice**	**6**
4	Prairie View A&M	5
1	**Rice**	**7**
3	Baylor	2
3	**Baylor**	**3**
2	Arizona State	2
Houston Regional–Reckling Park
4	Prairie View A&M	4
2	**Arizona State**	**13**
2	Arizona State	2
3	**Baylor**	**7**
1	Oklahoma	5
4	**TCU**	**6**
4	TCU	8
3	**Wichita State**	**18**
3	**Wichita State**	**2**
2	Houston	1
Norman Regional–L. Dale Mitchell Park
1	**Oklahoma**	**8**
2	Houston	6
1	**Oklahoma**	**15**
4	TCU	6

Regional finals
1	**Rice**	**7**	—
3	Baylor	4	—
3	Wichita State	7	6
1	**Oklahoma**	**12**	**7**

Super regionals
2	**Rice**	**10**	5	**9**
Oklahoma	4	**11**	5

=== Corvallis Super Regional ===
First round	Second round
1	**Texas**	**9**
4	Texas–Arlington	1
1	Texas	8
3	**Stanford**	**18**
3	**Stanford**	**7**
2	NC State	2
Austin Regional–Disch–Falk Field
4	Texas–Arlington	5
2	**NC State**	**6**^{10}
2	**NC State**	**6**
1	Texas	3
1	**Oregon State**	**5**
4	Wright State	3
1	**Oregon State**	**11**
2	Kansas	3
3	Hawaii	6
2	**Kansas**	**9**
Corvallis Regional–Goss Stadium
4	Wright State	3
3	**Hawaii**	**5**
3	**Hawaii**	**9**
2	Kansas	5

Regional finals
3	**Stanford**	**17**	—
2	NC State	7	—
1	**Oregon State**	**12**	—
3	Hawaii	3	—

Super regionals
Stanford	3	0	—
**Oregon State**	**4**	**15**	—

=== Tuscaloosa Super Regional ===
First round	Second round
1	**Alabama**	**13**
4	Jacksonville State	1
1	**Alabama**	**4**
2	Troy	3
3	Southern Miss	8
2	**Troy**	**10**
Tuscaloosa Regional–Sewell-Thomas Stadium
4	Jacksonville State	2
3	**Southern Miss**	**6**
3	Southern Miss	5
2	**Troy**	**6**
1	**North Carolina**	**15**
4	Maine	7
1	**North Carolina**	**14**
2	Winthrop	4
3	UNC Wilmington	2
2	**Winthrop**	**14**
Chapel Hill Regional–Boshamer Stadium
4	Maine	19
3	**UNC Wilmington**	**21**
3	UNC Wilmington	4
2	**Winthrop**	**5**

Regional finals
1	**Alabama**	**14**	—
2	Troy	5	—
1	**North Carolina**	**14**	—
2	Winthrop	2	—

Super regionals
4	Alabama	5	7	—
**North Carolina**	**11**	**8**	—

=== Fullerton Super Regional ===
First round	Second round
1	**Cal State Fullerton**	**6**
4	Saint Louis	1
1	**Cal State Fullerton**	**9**
2	Fresno State	2
3	San Diego	8
2	**Fresno State**	**9**
Fullerton Regional–Goodwin Field
4	Saint Louis	12
3	**San Diego**	**19**
3	San Diego	2
2	**Fresno State**	**9**
1	**Pepperdine**	**3**
4	Missouri	2
1	**Pepperdine**	**6**
2	UCLA	0
3	UC Irvine	2
2	**UCLA**	**3**
Malibu Regional–Eddy D. Field Stadium
4	**Missouri**	**5**^{14}
3	UC Irvine	4
4	**Missouri**	**2**
2	UCLA	1

Regional finals
1	**Cal State Fullerton**	**10**	—
2	Fresno State	3	—
1	Pepperdine	1	3
4	**Missouri**	**4**	**8**

Super regionals
5	**Cal State Fullerton**	**7**	**9**	—
Missouri	1	1	—

=== Oxford Super Regional ===
First round	Second round
1	Nebraska	1
4	**Manhattan**	**4**
4	Manhattan	2
2	**Miami (FL)**	**8**
3	San Francisco	2
2	**Miami (FL)**	**11**
Lincoln Regional–Haymarket Park
**1**	Nebraska	1
3	**San Francisco**	**5**
3	San Francisco	4
4	**Manhattan**	**6**
1	**Ole Miss**	**3**
4	Bethune-Cookman	2
1	**Ole Miss**	**9**
3	South Alabama	7
3	**South Alabama**	**7**
2	Tulane	1
Oxford Regional–Swayze Field
4	Bethune-Cookman	7
2	**Tulane**	**12**
2	**Tulane**	**18**
3	South Alabama	11

Regional finals
2	**Miami (FL)**	**10**	—
4	Manhattan	4	—
1	**Ole Miss**	**12**	—
2	Tulane	4	—

Super regionals
**Miami (FL)**	9	**7**	**14**
Ole Miss	**11**	0	9

=== Athens Super Regional ===
First round	Second round
1	**Georgia**	**11**
4	Sacred Heart	0
1	Georgia	4
2	**Florida State**	**6**
3	Jacksonville	0
2	**Florida State**	**18**
Athens Regional–Foley Field
4	Sacred Heart	3
3	**Jacksonville**	**4**
3	Jacksonville	8
1	**Georgia**	**15**
1	**Virginia**	**11**
4	Lehigh	5
1	Virginia	2
2	**South Carolina**	**8**
3	Evansville	2
2	**South Carolina**	**4**
Charlottesville Regional–Davenport Field
4	Lehigh	6
3	**Evansville**	**10**
3	**Evansville**	**15**
1	Virginia	5

Regional finals
2	Florida State	1	2
1	**Georgia**	**7**	**3**
2	**South Carolina**	5	**5**
3	Evansville	**15**	1

Super regionals
7	**Georgia**	6	**11**	**11**
South Carolina	**15**	5	6

=== Atlanta Super Regional ===
First round	Second round
1	**Georgia Tech**	**7**
4	Stetson	5
1	**Georgia Tech**	**7**
2	Vanderbilt	2
3	Michigan	2
2	**Vanderbilt**	**5**
Atlanta Regional–Russ Chandler Stadium
4	Stetson	1
3	**Michigan**	**11**
3	Michigan	4
2	**Vanderbilt**	**5**
1	Kentucky	1
4	**Ball State**	**3**
4	Ball State	0
2	**College of Charleston**	**11**
3	Notre Dame	4
2	**College of Charleston**	**5**^{16}
Lexington Regional–Cliff Hagan Stadium
1	**Kentucky**	**10**
3	Notre Dame	4
1	**Kentucky**	**12**
4	Ball State	9

Regional finals
1	**Georgia Tech**	**8**	—
2	Vanderbilt	4	—
2	**College of Charleston**	**7**	—
1	Kentucky	4	—

Super regionals
8	**Georgia Tech**	**5**	**12**	—
College of Charleston	0	3	—

== College World Series ==
=== Participants ===
School	Conference	Record (conference)	Head coach	CWS appearances	Best CWS finish	CWS record Not including this year
Clemson	ACC	52–14 (24–6)	Jack Leggett	10 (last: 2002)	3rd (1996, 2002)	9–20
Cal State Fullerton	Big West	48–13 (18–3)	George Horton	13 (last: 2004)	1st (1979, 1984, 1995, 2004)	32–21
Georgia	SEC	47–21 (18–12)	David Perno	4 (last: 2004)	1st (1990)	6–7
Georgia Tech	ACC	50–16 (19–11)	Danny Hall	2 (last: 2002)	2nd (1994)	4–3
Miami (FL)	ACC	41–22 (17–13)	Jim Morris	21 (last: 2004)	1st (1982, 1985, 1999, 2001)	45–34
North Carolina	ACC	50–13 (22–8)	Mike Fox	4 (last: 1989)	3rd (1978)	2–8
Oregon State	Pac-10	44–14 (16–7)	Pat Casey	2 (last: 2005)	7th (1952, 2005)	0–4
Rice	C-USA	55–11 (22–2)	Wayne Graham	4 (last: 2003)	1st (2003)	6–7

=== Bracket ===
First round
1	**Clemson**	**8**
8	Georgia Tech	4
**North Carolina**	**7**^{13}
5	Cal State Fullerton	5
8	Georgia Tech	5
5	**Cal State Fullerton**	**7**
2	**Rice**	**6**
7	Georgia	4
**Miami (FL)**	**11**
Oregon State	1
7	Georgia	3
**Oregon State**	**5**

Second round
1	Clemson	0
**North Carolina**	**2**
5	**Cal State Fullerton**	**7**
1	Clemson	6
2	**Rice**	**3**
Miami (FL)	2
**Oregon State**	**8**
Miami (FL)	1

Semifinals
**North Carolina**	**6**	—
5	Cal State Fullerton	5	—
2	Rice	0	0
**Oregon State**	**5**	**2**

Finals
North Carolina	**4**	7	2
**Oregon State**	3	**11**	**3**

=== Championship series ===
==== Saturday 6/24 ====
===== Championship Game #1: 6:00 PM =====
Team	1	2	3	4	5	6	7	8	9	R	H	E
Oregon State	0	0	1	0	0	2	0	0	0	**3**	**9**	**0**
**North Carolina**	2	0	0	0	0	1	0	1	x	**4**	**10**	**1**
WP: Jonathon Hovis (8–2) LP: Joe Paterson (1–1) Sv: Andrew Carignan (15); Home runs: OSU: Gillespie; UNC: None

Note: 77 minute rain delay in top of 6th inning

==== Sunday 6/25 ====
===== Championship Game #2: 6:00 PM =====
Team	1	2	3	4	5	6	7	8	9	R	H	E
North Carolina	0	1	3	1	0	0	2	0	0	**7**	**13**	**0**
**Oregon State**	0	0	0	7	0	4	0	0	x	**11**	**14**	**0**
WP: Kevin Gunderson (3–2) LP: Matt Danford (7–2); Home runs: UNC: Federowicz (2); OSU: Rowe

==== Monday 6/26 ====
===== Championship Game #3: 6:00 PM =====
Team	1	2	3	4	5	6	7	8	9	R	H	E
North Carolina	0	0	0	0	2	0	0	0	0	**2**	**8**	**4**
**Oregon State**	0	0	0	2	0	0	0	1	x	**3**	**6**	**1**
WP: Dallas Buck (13–3) LP: Daniel Bard (9–4) Sv: Kevin Gunderson (20)

=== All-Tournament Team ===
The following players were members of the All-Tournament Team.

Position	Player	School
P	Kevin Gunderson	Oregon State
P	**Jonah Nickerson (MOP)**	Oregon State
C	Tim Federowicz	North Carolina
1B	Bill Rowe	Oregon State
2B	Justin Turner	Cal State Fullerton
3B	Shea McFeely	Oregon State
SS	Josh Horton	North Carolina
OF	Jay Cox	North Carolina
OF	Danny Dunn	Cal State Fullerton
OF	Cole Gillespie	Oregon State
DH	David Cooper	Cal State Fullerton

== Tournament performance by conference ==
Conference	Tournament record	Percentage	Schools to super regionals	Schools to CWS
Pacific-10	14-6	0.700	Oregon St, Stanford	Oregon St
ACC	29-13	0.690	Clemson, Georgia Tech, Miami, North Carolina	Clemson, Georgia Tech, Miami, North Carolina
Big West	7-4	0.636	Cal State Fullerton	Cal State Fullerton
Mid-Con	3-2	0.600	Oral Roberts	
SEC	21-16	0.568	Alabama, Georgia, Ole Miss, South Carolina	Georgia
Missouri Valley	5-4	0.556		
Conference USA	10-9	0.526	Rice	Rice
Southern	4-4	0.500	College of Charleston	
Western Athletic	4-4	0.500		
Metro Atlantic	2-2	0.500		
Big 12	15-16	0.484	Missouri, Oklahoma	
Sun Belt	3-4	0.429		
WCC	4-6	0.400		
Big South	2-4	0.333		
Big Ten	1-2	0.333		
Colonial	1-2	0.333		
Mid-American	1–2	0.333		
Mountain West	1-2	0.333		
Atlantic Sun	1-4	0.200		
America East	0-2	0.000		
Atlantic 10	0-2	0.000		
Big East	0-2	0.000		
Horizon	0-2	0.000		
Ivy	0-2	0.000		
Mid-Eastern	0-2	0.000		
Northeast	0-2	0.000		
Ohio Valley	0-2	0.000		
Patriot	0-2	0.000		
Southland	0-2	0.000		
Southwestern Athletic	0-2	0.000		

== Notes on tournament field ==
- Lehigh, UNC Asheville, San Francisco, Prairie View, and Sacred Heart were making their first NCAA tournament appearance.

== See also ==
- 2006 NCAA Division II baseball tournament
- 2006 NCAA Division III baseball tournament
- 2006 NAIA World Series
