= Clemson Tigers baseball statistical leaders =

The Clemson Tigers baseball statistical leaders are individual statistical leaders of the Clemson Tigers baseball program in various categories, including batting average, home runs, runs batted in, runs, hits, stolen bases, ERA, and Strikeouts. Within those areas, the lists identify single-game, single-season, and career leaders. The Tigers represent Clemson University in the NCAA's Atlantic Coast Conference.

Clemson began competing in intercollegiate baseball in 1896. These lists are updated through the end of the 2025 season.

== Batting Average ==
Career (Minimum 100 at-bats.)
Rk	Player	AVG	Seasons
1	Denny Walling	.421	1975
2	Dude Buchanan	.402	1939 1940 1941
3	Shane Monahan	.394	1993 1994 1995
4	Billy Amick	.382	2022 2023
5	Billy McMillon	.381	1991 1992 1993
6	Herb Jessen	.380	1942 1943
7	Rusty Adkins	.379	1965 1966 1967
8	Khalil Greene	.377	1999 2000 2001 2002
9	Ted Corbin	.372	1992
10	Tim Teufel	.367	1979 1980

Season (Minimum 50 at-bats)
Rk	Player	AVG	Season
1	Dude Buchanan	.485	1941
2	Khalil Greene	.470	2002
3	Homer Coker	.462	1943
4	Rusty Adkins	.444	1965
5	Johnny Jones	.439	1962
6	Hank Sullivan	.429	1943
7	Wyman Morris	.422	1953
8	Denny Walling	.421	1975
9	Shane Monahan	.415	1994

== Home Runs ==
Career
Rk	Player	HR	Seasons
1	Jeff Baker	59	2000 2001 2002
	Andy D'Alessio	59	2004 2005 2006 2007
3	Michael Johnson	58	2000 2001 2002 2003
4	Seth Beer	56	2016 2017 2018
5	Matthew LeCroy	53	1995 1996 1997
6	Jim McCollom	52	1982 1983 1984 1985
	Khalil Greene	52	1999 2000 2001 2002
8	Eric Macrina	51	1988 1989 1990 1991
9	Kyle Parker	46	2008 2009 2010
10	Caden Grice	45	2021 2022 2023

Season
Rk	Player	HR	Season
1	Khalil Greene	27	2002
	Max Wagner	27	2022
3	Jeff Baker	25	2002
	Michael Johnson	25	2002
	Kris Harvey	25	2005
6	Eric Macrina	24	1991
	Matthew LeCroy	24	1997
8	Jeff Baker	23	2001
	Andy D'Alessio	23	2006
10	Seth Beer	22	2018
	Jimmy Obertop	22	2024
	Blake Wright	22	2024

Single Game
Rk	Player	HR	Season	Opponent
1	Ray Mathews	3	1950	Furman
	Bill Barnett	3	1953	Furman
	Jack McCall	3	1964	Georgia Tech
	Denny Walling	3	1975	Wake Forest
	Neil Simons	3	1979	NC State
	Bob Paulling	3	1983	Georgia
	Steve Baucom	3	1987	Charlotte
	Chuck Baldwin	3	1987	Maryland
	Shane Monahan	3	1993	NC State
	Jeff Baker	3	2002	Winthrop
	Taylor Harbin	3	2005	NC State
	Kyle Parker	3	2008	Wake Forest
	John Hinson	3	2010	USC Upstate
	Grayson Byrd	3	2018	Charleston Southern
	Caden Grice	3	2021	Louisville
	Will Taylor	3	2024	USC Upstate
	Blake Wright	3	2024	Presbyterian
	Jimmy Obertop	3	2024	Pittsburgh

== Runs Batted In ==
Career
Rk	Player	RBI	Seasons
1	Khalil Greene	276	1999 2000 2001 2002
2	Jeff Baker	226	2000 2001 2002
3	Jim McCollom	218	1982 1983 1984 1985
4	Andy D'Alessio	217	2004 2005 2006 2007
5	Kurt Bultmann	214	1996 1997 1998 1999
6	Michael Johnson	213	2000 2001 2002 2003
7	Jeff Schaus	211	2008 2009 2010 2011
8	Gary Burnham	209	1994 1995 1996 1997
9	Matthew LeCroy	208	1995 1996 1997
10	Jim Crowley	197	1988 1989 1990 1991

Season
Rk	Player	RBI	Season
1	Khalil Greene	91	2002
2	Jeff Baker	87	2002
	Jeff Schaus	87	2010
4	Andy D'Alessio	85	2006
5	Eric Macrina	84	1991
6	Gary Burnham	82	1997
7	Michael Johnson	81	2002
8	Jerry Brooks	80	1988
9	Keith Williams	79	1993
	Matthew LeCroy	79	1997

Single Game
Rk	Player	RBI	Season	Opponent
1	Ray Mathews	10	1950	Furman
	Neil Simons	10	1979	NC State
	Jerry Brooks	10	1988	Charlotte

== Runs ==
Career
Rk	Player	R	Seasons
1	Bert Heffernan	285	1985 1986 1987 1988
2	Khalil Greene	265	1999 2000 2001 2002
3	Shane Monahan	235	1993 1994 1995
4	Kurt Bultmann	233	1996 1997 1998 1999
5	Gary Burnham	215	1994 1995 1996 1997
6	Jeff Schaus	213	2008 2009 2010 2011
7	Jim McCollom	203	1982 1983 1984 1985
8	Michael Johnson	201	2000 2001 2002 2003
9	Jim Crowley	199	1988 1989 1990 1991
10	Patrick Boyd	196	1998 1999 2000 2001

Season
Rk	Player	R	Season
1	Shane Monahan	97	1994
2	Bert Heffernan	93	1988
	Khalil Greene	93	2002
4	Brian Kowitz	87	1990
5	Henrí Stanley	85	1999
	Kyle Parker	85	2010
7	Mike Hampton	84	1994
8	Gary Burnham	83	1997
9	Shane Monahan	82	1995
10	Jim Crowley	79	1991
	David Miller	79	1995

Single Game
Rk	Player	R	Season	Opponent
1	Dave Buffamoyer	7	1979	NC State

== Hits ==
Career
Rk	Player	H	Seasons
1	Khalil Greene	403	1999 2000 2001 2002
2	Shane Monahan	337	1993 1994 1995
3	Bert Heffernan	335	1985 1986 1987 1988
4	Chuck Baldwin	311	1984 1985 1986 1987
	Jeff Schaus	311	2008 2009 2010 2011
6	Kurt Bultmann	306	1996 1997 1998 1999
7	Jim McCollom	285	1982 1983 1984 1985
8	Michael Johnson	275	2000 2001 2002 2003
9	Jim Crowley	271	1988 1989 1990 1991
10	Neil Simons	270	1977 1978 1979 1980
	Gary Burnham	270	1994 1995 1996 1997

Season
Rk	Player	H	Season
1	Shane Monahan	137	1994
2	Khalil Greene	134	2002
3	Mike Hampton	109	1994
4	Chuck Baldwin	107	1986
5	Jerry Brooks	106	1988
	Shane Monahan	106	1995
7	Gary Burnham	104	1997
8	David Miller	103	1995
	Casey Stone	103	2001
10	Brian Kowitz	102	1990

Single Game
Rk	Player	H	Season	Opponent
1	Joey Taylor	6	1962	South Carolina
	Neil Simons	6	1980	Georgia
	Greg Guin	6	1981	Georgia
	Bob Paulling	6	1983	Georgia Tech
	Bert Heffernan	6	1987	Auburn
	Jerry Brooks	6	1988	Charlotte
	Chad Phillips	6	1992	Maryland
	Brad McCann	6	2004	College of Charleston

== Stolen Bases ==
Career
Rk	Player	SB	Seasons
1	Henry Threadgill	85	1986 1987 1988 1989
	Mike Couture	85	1987 1988 1989 1990
3	Kevin Northrup	83	1989 1990 1991 1992
4	Brian Kowitz	76	1988 1989 1990
5	Brooks Shumake	71	1982 1983 1984
6	Ray Williams	70	1984 1985 1986 1987
7	Billy Weems	68	1977 1978 1979 1980
8	Randy Mazey	65	1985 1986 1987 1988
9	Shane Monahan	61	1993 1994 1995
10	Bill Spiers	60	1985 1986 1987

Season
Rk	Player	SB	Season
1	Henry Threadgill	47	1989
	Kevin Northrup	47	1992
3	Mike Hampton	39	1994
4	Bill Spiers	35	1986
5	Randy Mazey	34	1988
	Mike Couture	34	1989
	Brian Kowitz	34	1990
8	Mike Couture	32	1988
	Henry Threadgill	32	1988
10	Billy Weems	30	1980
	Brooks Shumake	30	1983
	Sam Hall	30	2019

Single Game
Rk	Player	SB	Season	Opponent
	Fred Knoebel	5	1950	Furman
	Mike Couture	5	1989	NC State

== Earned Run Average ==
Career (Minimum 100 innings pitched)
Rk	Player	ERA	Seasons
1	Billy O'Dell	1.51	1952 1953 1954
2	Scott Winchester	1.70	1993 1994 1995
3	Steve Cline	1.94	1973 1974
4	Jay Bevis	2.13	1969 1970 1971 1972
5	Matthew Crownover	2.30	2013 2014 2015
6	Harold Stowe	2.32	1957 1958 1959
7	Rusty Gerhardt	2.39	1969 1970 1971 1972
8	Chuck Porter	2.43	1974 1975 1976
9	Carson Spiers	2.47	2017 2018 2019 2020
10	Bill Parmer	2.59	1965 1966 1967

Season (Minimum 40 innings pitched)
Rk	Player	ERA	Season
1	Scott Winchester	0.59	1995
2	Billy O'Dell	0.79	1954
3	Joe Landrum	1.04	1946
4	Scott Clackum	1.11	1998
5	Jay Bevis	1.12	1970
6	Bill Parmer	1.14	1967
7	Brian Snyder	1.19	1977
8	Mike Holtz	1.26	1992
9	Jerome Santivasci	1.36	1989
10	Billy O'Dell	1.37	1953

== Strikeouts ==
Career
Rk	Player	K	Seasons
1	Brian Barnes	513	1986 1987 1988 1989
2	Rusty Gerhardt	382	1969 1970 1971 1972
3	Ryan Mottl	360	1997 1998 1999 2000
4	Kris Benson	356	1994 1995 1996
5	Billy Koch	338	1994 1995 1996
6	Aidan Knaak	306	2024 2025 2026
7	Billy O'Dell	300	1952 1953 1954
8	Daniel Gossett	285	2012 2013 2014
9	Harold Stowe	279	1957 1958 1959
10	Jason Dawsey	276	1993 1994 1995
11	Steve Reba	263	1999 2000 2001 2002

Season
Rk	Player	K	Season
1	Brian Barnes	208	1989
2	Kris Benson	204	1996
3	Billy Koch	152	1996
4	Brian Barnes	140	1988
5	Ken Vining	135	1996
6	Jason Dawsey	133	1995
7	Harold Stowe	126	1958
8	Harold Stowe	117	1959
9	Charlie Barnes	113	2017
10	Brian Barnes	112	1987

Single Game
Rk	Player	K	Season	Opponent
1	Flint Rhem	21	1923	Furman
	Billy O'Dell	21	1952	South Carolina
