= Atlantic Coast Conference Baseball Player of the Year =

- Awarded for: the most outstanding baseball player in the Atlantic Coast Conference
- Country: United States
- First award: 1969
- Currently held by: Tague Davis, Louisville

The Atlantic Coast Conference Baseball Player of the Year is a baseball award given to the Atlantic Coast Conference's most outstanding player. The award was first given following the 1969 season, with both pitchers and position players eligible. After the 2005 season, the Atlantic Coast Conference Baseball Pitcher of the Year award was created to honor the most outstanding pitcher.

== Key ==
*	Awarded a national Player of the Year award: the Dick Howser Trophy or the Golden Spikes Award
Player (X)	Denotes the number of times the player had been awarded the Player of the Year award at that point

== Winners ==
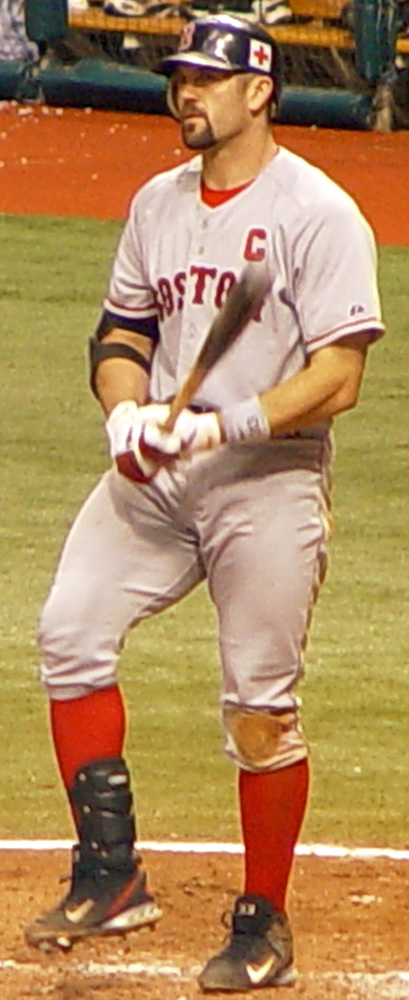
Jason Varitek of Georgia Tech won the award in 1993.

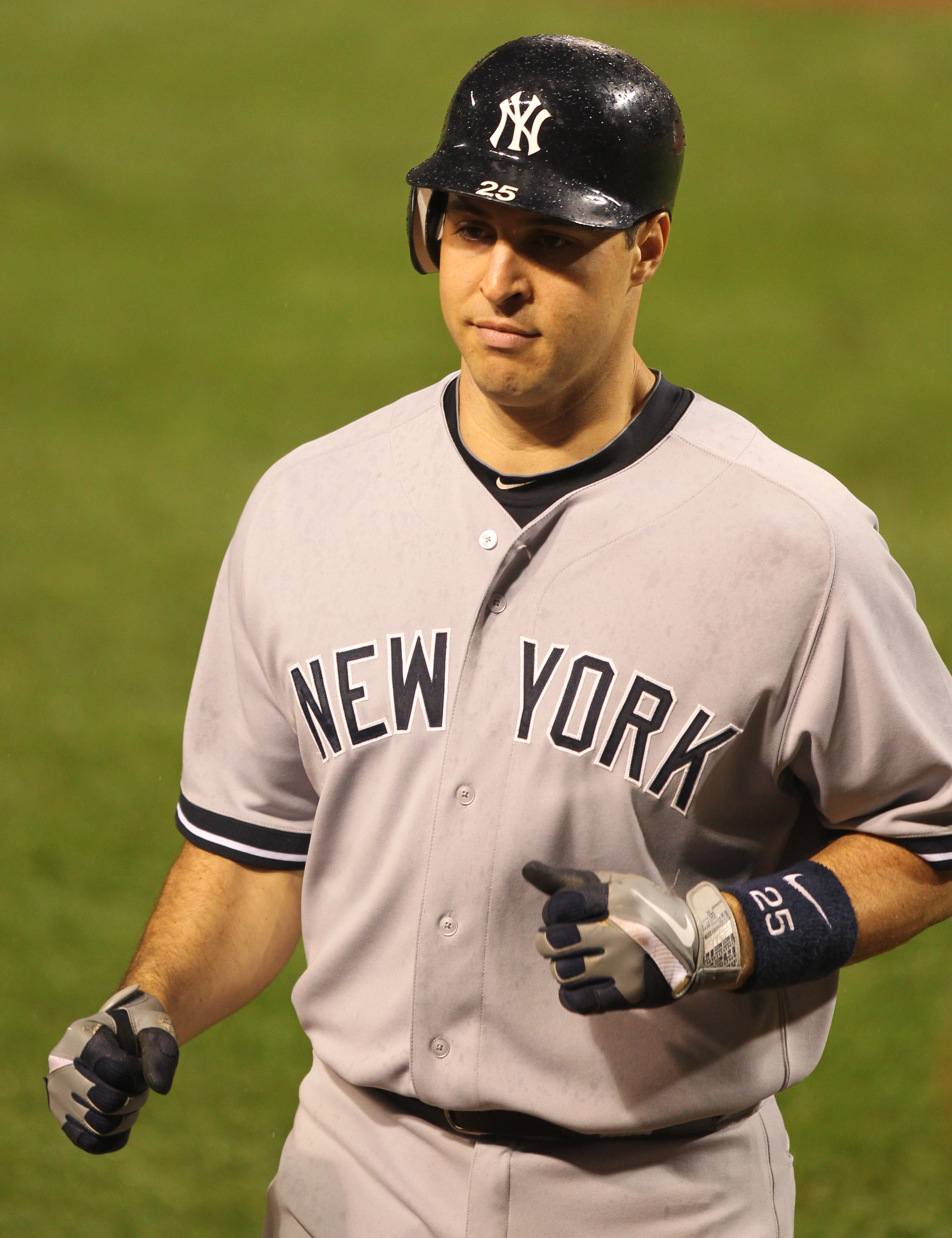
Mark Teixira also won the award in 2000 as a Georgia Tech YellowJacket.

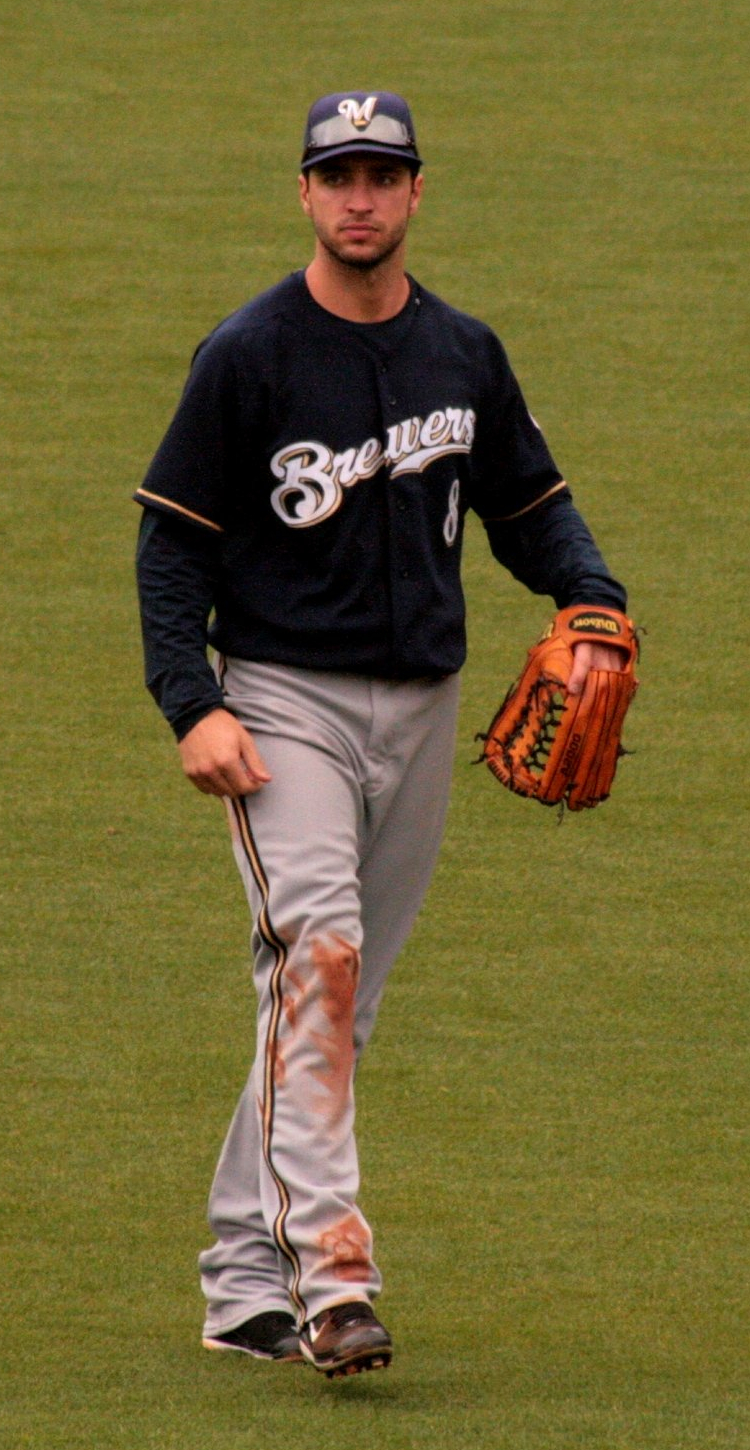
Miami's Ryan Braun won the award in 2005 as a junior.

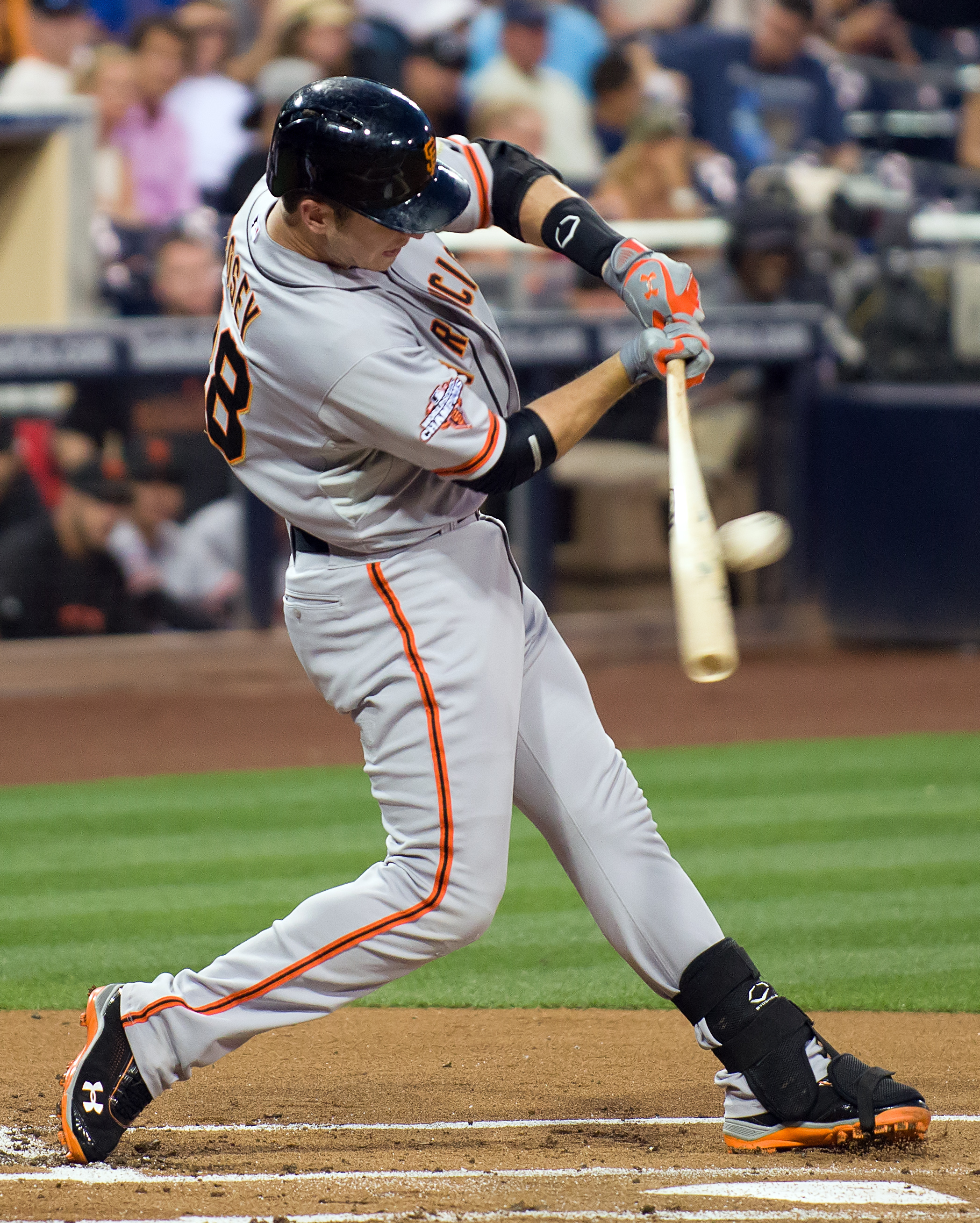
Buster Posey won the award in 2008 while playing for Florida State.

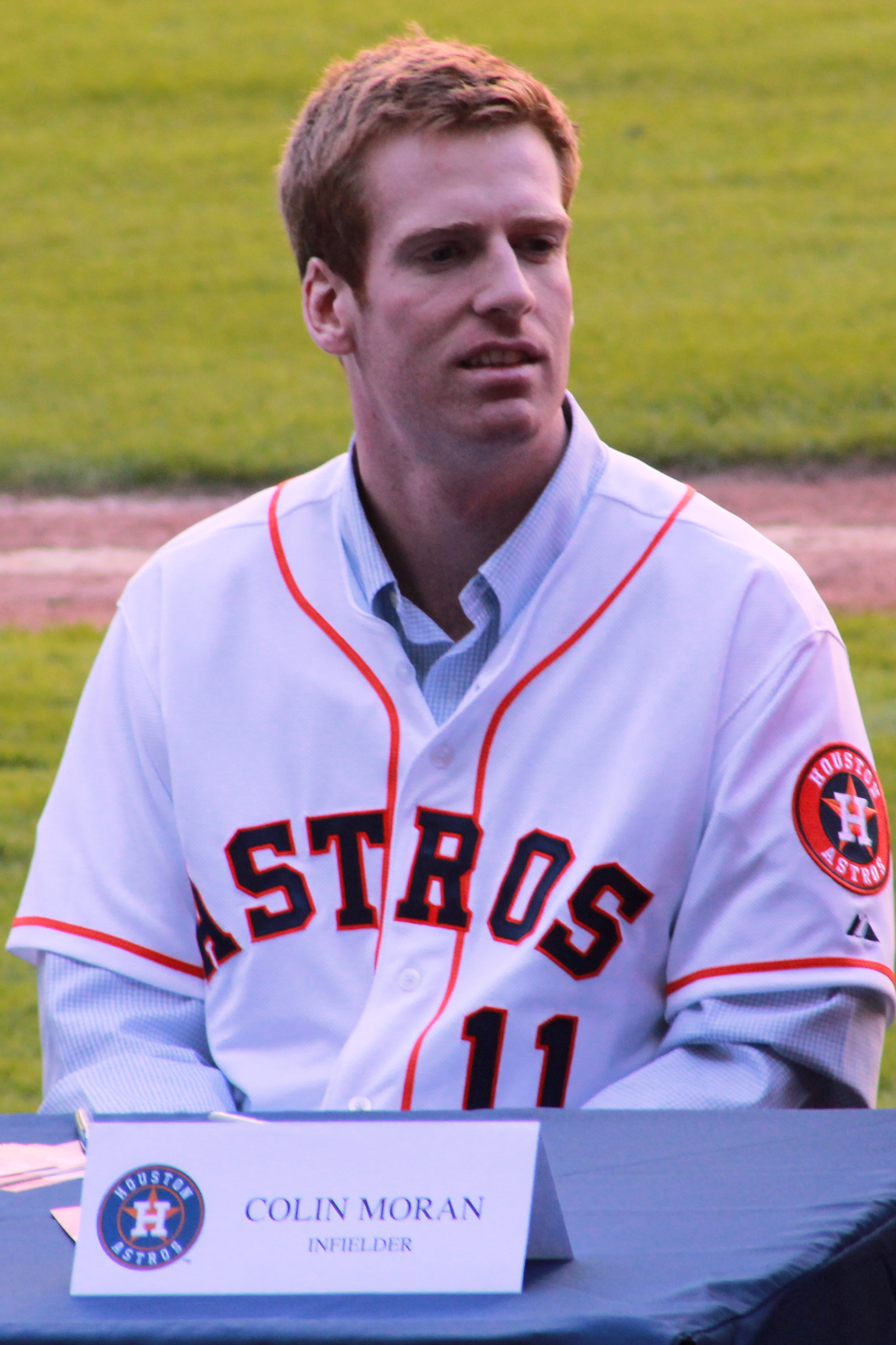
Colin Moran of North Carolina won the award in 2013.

Season	Player	School	Position	Reference
1969	Chris Cammack	NC State	Third baseman	
1970	Eddie Hill	North Carolina	First baseman	
1971	Mike Caldwell	NC State	Pitcher	
1972	Bob Grossman	Maryland	Pitcher	
1973	Craig White	Clemson	Outfielder	
1974	Steve Cline	Clemson	Pitcher	
1975	Denny Walling	Clemson	Outfielder	
1976	Chuck Porter	Clemson	Pitcher	
1977	Kenny Baker	Wake Forest	Outfielder	
1978	Greg Norris	North Carolina	Pitcher	
1979	Jim Atkinson	North Carolina	Third baseman	
1980	Scott Bradley	North Carolina	Third baseman	
1981	Brick Smith	Wake Forest	First baseman	
1982	Bill Merrifield	Wake Forest	Shortstop	
1983	Bill Merrifield (2)	Wake Forest	Shortstop	
1984	Tracy Woodson	NC State	First baseman	
1985	Jim McCollom	Clemson	First baseman	
1986	Chuck Baldwin	Clemson	First baseman	
1987	Riccardo Ingram	Georgia Tech	Outfielder	
1988	Turtle Zaun	NC State	First baseman	
1989	Brian Barnes	Clemson	Pitcher	
1990	Brian Kowitz	Clemson	Pitcher	
1991	Andy Bruce	Georgia Tech	Third baseman	
1992	Derek Hacopian	Maryland	Outfielder	
1993	Jason Varitek	Georgia Tech	Catcher	
1994	Ryan Jackson	Duke	First baseman	
1995	Shane Monahan	Clemson	Outfielder	
1996	Kris Benson*	Clemson	Pitcher	
1997	J. D. Drew*	Florida State	Outfielder	
1998	Brian Roberts	North Carolina	Shortstop	
1999	Marshall McDougall	Florida State	Second baseman	
2000	Mark Teixeira*	Georgia Tech	Third baseman	
2001	John-Ford Griffin	Florida State	Outfielder	
2002	Khalil Greene*	Clemson	Shortstop	
2003	Jamie D'Antona	Wake Forest	Third baseman	
2004	Joe Koshansky	Virginia	Pitcher/First baseman	
2005	Ryan Braun	Miami (FL)	Third baseman	
2006	Sean Doolittle	Virginia	Pitcher/First baseman	
2007	Tony Thomas, Jr.	Florida State	Second baseman	
2008	Buster Posey*	Florida State	Catcher	
2009	Dustin Ackley	North Carolina	First baseman	
2010	Yasmani Grandal	Miami (FL)	Catcher	
2011	Brad Miller	Clemson	Shortstop	
2012	James Ramsey	Florida State	Outfielder	
2013	Colin Moran	North Carolina	Third Base	
2014	DJ Stewart	Florida State	Outfielder	
2015	Will Craig	Wake Forest	Pitcher/First baseman	
2016	Seth Beer*	Clemson	Outfielder/First baseman	
2017	Brendan McKay*	Louisville	Pitcher/First baseman	
2018	Joey Bart	Georgia Tech	Catcher	
2019	Bobby Seymour	Wake Forest	First Baseman	
2021	Matheu Nelson	Florida State	Catcher	
2022	Max Wagner	Clemson	Third Baseman	
2023	Kyle Teel	Virginia	Catcher	
2024	James Tibbs III	Florida State	Outfielder	
2025	Alex Lodise*	Florida State	Shortstop	
2026	Tague Davis	Louisville	First baseman	

== Winners by school ==
Note that because NCAA baseball is a spring sport, the year of joining the ACC is the calendar year before the first season of competition.

School (year joined)	Winners	Years
Clemson (1953)	14	1973, 1974, 1975, 1976, 1985, 1986, 1989, 1990, 1995, 1996, 2002, 2011, 2016, 2022
Florida State (1991)	10	1997, 1999, 2001, 2007, 2008, 2012, 2014, 2021, 2024, 2025
North Carolina (1953)	7	1970, 1978, 1979, 1980, 1998, 2009, 2013
Wake Forest (1953)	7	1977, 1981, 1982, 1983, 2003, 2015, 2019
Georgia Tech (1978)	5	1987, 1991, 1993, 2000, 2018
NC State (1953)	4	1969, 1971, 1984, 1988
Virginia (1953)	3	2004, 2006, 2023
Louisville (2014)	2	2017, 2026
Miami (FL) (2004)	2	2005, 2010
Maryland (1953)^{[a]}	2	1972, 1992
Duke (1953)	1	1994
Boston College (2005)	0	—
California (2025)	0	—
Notre Dame (2013)	0	—
Pittsburgh (2013)	0	—
Stanford (2025)	0	—
Virginia Tech (2004)	0	—

== Footnotes ==
- ^{a} The University of Maryland left the ACC in 2014 to join the Big Ten Conference.
