= 2006 Clemson Tigers baseball team =

American college baseball season

2006 Clemson Tigers baseball

ACC Atlantic Division Champions ACC Tournament champions Clemson Regional champions Clemson Super Regional champions

College World Series, 1–2
- Conference: Atlantic Coast Conference
- Atlantic
- Record: 53–16 (24-6 ACC)
- Head coach: Jack Leggett
- Home stadium: Doug Kingsmore Stadium

2006 Atlantic Coast Conference baseball standings
	Conf.				Overall
Team	W		L	PCT	W		L	PCT
Atlantic
No. 5 Clemson ^{x}‍‍‡‍^{y}	24	–	6	.800	53	–	16	.768
No. 24 Florida State ‍‍‍^{y}	16	–	13	.552	44	–	21	.677
No. 29 NC State ‍‍‍^{y}	16	–	13	.552	40	–	23	.635
Wake Forest ‍‍‍	16	–	13	.552	33	–	22	.600
Boston College ‍‍‍	9	–	21	.300	28	–	25	.528
Maryland ‍‍‍	8	–	22	.267	26	–	30	.464
Coastal
No. 2 North Carolina ^{x}‍‍‍^{y}	22	–	8	.733	54	–	15	.783
No. 20 Virginia ‍‍‍^{y}	21	–	9	.700	47	–	15	.758
No. 8 Georgia Tech ‍‍‍^{y}	19	–	11	.633	50	–	18	.735
No. 6 Miami (FL) ‍‍‍^{y}	17	–	13	.567	42	–	24	.636
Duke ‍‍‍	6	–	24	.200	15	–	40	.273
Virginia Tech ‍‍‍	4	–	25	.138	20	–	33	.377
x – Division champion ‡ – Tournament champion y – Invited to the NCAA tournament As of June 30, 2006; Rankings from Collegiate Baseball

The 2006 Clemson Tigers baseball team represented Clemson University in the 2006 NCAA Division I baseball season. The team played their home games at Doug Kingsmore Stadium in Clemson, SC.

The team was coached by Jack Leggett, who completed his thirteenth season at Clemson. The Tigers reached the 2006 College World Series, their eleventh appearance in Omaha.

== Roster ==
2006 Clemson Tigers roster
- Alex Burg; - Herman Demmink; - Ben Hall; - Doug Hogan; - John Ingram; - Tanner Leggett; - D. J. Mitchell	Pitchers: - Jason Berken - Junior; - Sean Clark; - Stephen Clyne; - Josh Cribb - Senior; - Stephen Faris - Junior; - Drew Fiorenza; - Ryan Hinson; - Chris Howard; - David Kopp; - Alex Martin; - Steve Richard; - P. J. Zocchi	Catchers: - Adrian Casanova - Senior; Infielders: - Andy D'Alessio - Junior; - Taylor Harbin - Sophomore; - Stan Widmann - Sophomore; - Marquez Smith - Junior	Outfielders: - Brad Chalk - Sophomore; - Tyler Colvin - Junior; - Travis Storrer - Senior; - Casey Keen - Freshman

== Schedule ==
Legend
	Clemson win
	Clemson loss
**Bold**	Clemson team member
*	Non-Conference game

2006 Clemson Tigers baseball game log
Regular season

February
Date	Opponent	Rank	Site/stadium	Score	Win	Loss	Save	Attendance	Overall record	ACC record
Feb 17	James Madison*		Doug Kingsmore Stadium • Clemson, SC	**W** 8–1	**Berken (1–0)**	Miller (0–1)	None		1–0	
Feb 17	James Madison*		Doug Kingsmore Stadium • Clemson, SC	**W** 3–0	**Faris (1–0)**	Nesbitt (0–1)	**Richard (1)**	5,617	2–0	
Feb 19	James Madison*		Doug Kingsmore Stadium • Clemson, SC	**W** 6–1	**Cribb (1–0)**	Reid (0–1)	None	3,183	3–0	
Feb 24	Mercer*		Doug Kingsmore Stadium • Clemson, SC	**W** 5–1	**Berken (2–0)**	New (2–1)	None	4,702	4–0	
Feb 26	Mercer*		Doug Kingsmore Stadium • Clemson, SC	**L** 2–3	Barrett (2–0)	**Moskos (0–1)**	Urena (4)		4–1	
Feb 26	Mercer*		Doug Kingsmore Stadium • Clemson, SC	**W** 9–4	**Cribb (2–0)**	Abercrombie (3–1)	None	5,569	5–1	

March
Date	Opponent	Rank	Site/stadium	Score	Win	Loss	Save	Attendance	Overall record	ACC record
Mar 3	at College of Charleston*		CofC Baseball Stadium at Patriot's Point • Mount Pleasant, SC	**W** 6–0	**Zochi (1–0)**	Godfrey (2–2)	None	3,122	6–1	
Mar 4	at South Carolina*		Sarge Frye Field • Columbia, SC	**L** 2–6	Cruse (2–0)	**Berken (2–1)**	None	5,861	6–2	
Mar 5	South Carolina*		Doug Kingsmore Stadium • Clemson, SC	**W** 6–4	**Cribb (3–0)**	Lambert (2–1)	**Richard (2)**	5,617	7–2	
Mar 8	William & Mary*		Doug Kingsmore Stadium • Clemson, SC	**W** 10–5	**Clyne (1–0)**	Sosonko (0–1)	None	3,859	8–2	
Mar 10	Kansas*		Doug Kingsmore Stadium • Clemson, SC	**W** 7–2	**Cribb (4–0)**	Land (4–2)	None	4,525	9–2	
Mar 11	Kansas*		Doug Kingsmore Stadium • Clemson, SC	**L** 5–6	D. Czyz (2–0)	**Clyne (1–1)**	None	5,261	9–3	
Mar 12	Kansas*		Doug Kingsmore Stadium • Clemson, SC	**W** 4–3	**Moskos (1–1)**	Marks (1–1)	**Richard (3)**	4,694	10–3	
Mar 15	Gardner–Webb*		Doug Kingsmore Stadium • Clemson, SC	**W** 10–5	**Kopp (1–0)**	Campbell (1–2)	None	3,570	11–3	
Mar 17	at Virginia		Davenport Field • Charlottesville, VA	**L** 1–2	Lambert (1–1)	**Moskos (1–2)**	None	1,304	11–4	0–1
Mar 18	at Virginia		Davenport Field • Charlottesville, VA	**L** 2–10	Thompson (5–0)	**Berken (2–2)**	None	1,869	11–5	0–2
Mar 19	at Virginia		Davenport Field • Charlottesville, VA	**L** 4–7	Lambert (2–1)	**Moskos (1–3)**	None	1,879	11–6	0–3
Mar 21	Elon*		Doug Kingsmore Stadium • Clemson, SC	**W** 5–3	**Hinson (1–0)**	Hensley (0–3)	None	2,908	12–6	
Mar 22	Elon*		Doug Kingsmore Stadium • Clemson, SC	**W** 7–4	**Martin (1–0)**	Lewter (0–1)	**Moskos (1)**	3,136	13–6	
Mar 24	NC State		Doug Kingsmore Stadium • Clemson, SC	**W** 9–5	**Cribb (5–0)**	McConnell (4–3)	**Richard (4)**	3,951	14–6	1–3
Mar 25	NC State		Doug Kingsmore Stadium • Clemson, SC	**W** 4–2	**Berken (3–2)**	Surkamp (2–1)	**Moskos (2)**	3,914	15–6	2–3
Mar 26	NC State		Doug Kingsmore Stadium • Clemson, SC	**W** 6–2	**Faris (2–0)**	Brackman (0–2)	None	4,782	16–6	3–3
Mar 28	at Georgia*		Foley Field • Athens, GA	**L** 11–12^{10}	Fields (2–0)	**Moskos (1–4)**	None	1,811	16–7	
Mar 29	Georgia*		Doug Kingsmore Stadium • Clemson, SC	**W** 10–7	**Zocchi (2–0)**	Moreau (3–1)	**Fiorenza (1)**	5,426	17–7	
Mar 31	at Miami (FL)		Alex Rodriguez Park at Mark Light Field • Coral Gables, FL	**W** 8–6	**Martin (2–0)**	Gutierrez (7–2)	**Moskos (3)**	2,312	18–7	4–3

April
Date	Opponent	Rank	Site/stadium	Score	Win	Loss	Save	Attendance	Overall record	ACC record
Apr 1	at Miami (FL)		Mark Light Field • Coral Gables, FL	**W** 6–2	**Berken (4–2)**	Miguelez (5–2)	**Moskos (4)**	2,304	19–7	5–3
Apr 2	at Miami (FL)		Mark Light Field • Coral Gables, FL	**W** 14–1	**Faris (3–0)**	Maine (5–1)	None	1,927	20–7	6–3
Apr 4	Western Carolina*		Doug Kingsmore Stadium • Clemson, SC	**L** 6–8	McCullen (4–1)	**Vaughn (0–1)**	Holland (2)	3,773	20–8	
Apr 5	at South Carolina*		Sarge Frye Field • Columbia, SC	**W** 3–2	**Moskos (2–4)**	Lalor (0–1)	None	5,782	21–8	
Apr 7	Maryland		Doug Kingsmore Stadium • Clemson, SC	**W** 3–1	**Cribb (6–0)**	Baron (1–3)	None	5,209	22–8	7–3
Apr 8	Maryland		Doug Kingsmore Stadium • Clemson, SC	**W** 3–2^{11}	**Moskos (3–4)**	Cecil (4–3)	None	5,617	23–8	8–3
Apr 9	Maryland		Doug Kingsmore Stadium • Clemson, SC	**W** 15–7	**Faris (4–0)**	Tidball (3–5)	None	5,150	24–8	9–3
Apr 11	at Western Carolina*		Hennon Stadium • Cullowhee, NC	**W** 8–3	**Zocchi (3–0)**	Johnson (2–1)	**Moskos (5)**	2,823	25–8	
Apr 12	South Carolina*		Doug Kingsmore Stadium • Clemson, SC	**W** 10–5	**Kopp (2–0)**	Cruse (3–1)	None	5,617	26–8	
Apr 14	at Georgia Tech		Russ Chandler Stadium • Atlanta, GA	**W** 7–6	**Hinson (2–0)**	Turner (3–2)	**Moskos (6)**	2,642	27–8	10–3
Apr 15	at Georgia Tech		Russ Chandler Stadium • Atlanta, GA	**L** 3–12	Ladd (3–2)	**Berken (4–3)**	None	3,192	27–9	10–4
Apr 16	at Georgia Tech		Russ Chandler Stadium • Atlanta, GA	**L** 4–22	Duncan (4–1)	**Faris (4–1)**	None	2,087	27–10	10–5
Apr 18	Winthrop*		Doug Kingsmore Stadium • Clemson, SC	**L** 3–6	Wilson (9–2)	**Kopp (2–1)**	Rollins (1)	4,095	27–11	
Apr 19	Furman*		Doug Kingsmore Stadium • Clemson, SC	**L** 4–5	Arnett (2–5)	**Richard (0–1)**	Hollstegge (8)	3,929	27–12	
Apr 21	at Boston College		Eddie Pellagrini Diamond at John Shea Field • Chestnut Hill, MA	**W** 6–3	**Cribb (7–0)**	Houston (2–5)	**Moskos (7)**	340	28–12	11–5
Apr 22	at Boston College		Eddie Pellagrini Diamond at John Shea Field • Chestnut Hill, MA	**L** 2–3	Doyle (3–4)	**Faris (4–2)**	Boggan (5)		28–13	11–6
Apr 22	at Boston College		Eddie Pellagrini Diamond at John Shea Field • Chestnut Hill, MA	**W** 4–1	**Berken (5–3)**	Jeanes (1–4)	**Hinson (1)**	862	29–13	12–6
Apr 26	Wofford*		Doug Kingsmore Stadium • Clemson, SC	**W** 10–1	**Faris (5–1)**	Austin (0–3)	None	2,944	30–13	
Apr 28	Virginia Tech		Doug Kingsmore Stadium • Clemson, SC	**W** 11–2	**Cribb (8–0)**	Fryman (3–6)	None	5,187	31–13	13–6
Apr 29	Virginia Tech		Doug Kingsmore Stadium • Clemson, SC	**W** 11–4	**Berken (6–3)**	Frederickson (0–3)	None	4,993	32–13	14–6
Apr 30	Virginia Tech		Doug Kingsmore Stadium • Clemson, SC	**W** 7–3	**Kopp (3–1)**	Cross (3–7)	None	4,341	33–13	15–6

May
Date	Opponent	Rank	Site/stadium	Score	Win	Loss	Save	Attendance	Overall record	ACC record
May 8	at Duke		Jack Coombs Field • Durham, NC	**W** 7–4	Zocchi (4–0)	Wolcott (1–3)	**Moskos (8)**		34–13	16–6
May 8	at Duke		Jack Coombs Field • Durham, NC	**W** 14–0	Faris (6–2)	Perry (0–5)	None	270	35–13	17–6
May 9	at Duke		Jack Coombs Field • Durham, NC	**W** 8–2	Berken (7–3)	Gallagher (1–5)	None	327	36–13	18–6
May 12	Florida State		Doug Kingsmore Stadium • Clemson, SC	**W** 9–1	Faris (7–2)	Chambliss (10–4)	None	5,338	37–13	19–6
May 13	Florida State		Doug Kingsmore Stadium • Clemson, SC	**W** 4–3^{10}	Hinson (3–0)	Tucker (0–1)	None	5,470	38–13	20–6
May 14	Florida State		Doug Kingsmore Stadium • Clemson, SC	**W** 11–2	Berken (8–3)	Sauls (1–1)	None	4,582	39–13	21–6
May 16	College of Charleston*		Doug Kingsmore Stadium • Clemson, SC	**W** 1–0	Zocchi (5–0)	Beliveau (4–3)	**Moskos (9)**	4,259	40–13	
May 18	Wake Forest		Doug Kingsmore Stadium • Clemson, SC	**W** 26–1	Faris (8–2)	Kledzik (5–4)	None	4,501	41–13	22–6
May 19	Wake Forest		Doug Kingsmore Stadium • Clemson, SC	**W** 6–0	Cribb (9–0)	Niesen (3–1)	None	5,617	42–13	23–6
May 20	Wake Forest		Doug Kingsmore Stadium • Clemson, SC	**W** 7–3	Berken (9–3)	Keadle (5–3)	None	5,525	43–13	24–6

Postseason

ACC Tournament
Date	Opponent	Rank	Site/stadium	Score	Win	Loss	Save	Attendance	Overall record	ACCT Record
May 24	Wake Forest		Baseball Grounds of Jacksonville • Jacksonville, FL	**W** 13–1^{7}	**Zocchi (6–0)**	Niesen (3–2)	None	16,444	44–13	1–0
May 25	Georgia Tech		Baseball Grounds of Jacksonville • Jacksonville, FL	**W** 3–2	**Moskos (4–4)**	Wieters (1–2)	None	17,236	45–13	2–0
May 27	Georgia Tech		Baseball Grounds of Jacksonville • Jacksonville, FL	**L** 7–8^{10}	Goodman (2–0)	**Moskos (4–5)**	None		45–14	2–1
May 27	Georgia Tech		Baseball Grounds of Jacksonville • Jacksonville, FL	**W** 16–1	**Kopp (4–1)**	Hutts (0–1)	None	22,119	46–14	3–1
May 28	NC State		Baseball Grounds of Jacksonville • Jacksonville, FL	**W** 8–4	**Clark (1–0)**	Surkamp (2–3)	**Zocchi (1)**	4,172	47–14	4–1

NCAA Clemson Regional
Date	Opponent	Rank	Site/stadium	Score	Win	Loss	Save	Attendance	Overall record	Regional Record
June 3	UNC Asheville		Doug Kingsmore Stadium • Clemson, SC	**W** 3–0	**Clark (2–0)**	Nigro (5–11)	None	5,617	48–14	1–0
June 3	Elon		Doug Kingsmore Stadium • Clemson, SC	**W** 13–3	**Faris (9–2)**	Hensley (6–4)	None	5,617	49–14	2–0
June 4	Mississippi State		Doug Kingsmore Stadium • Clemson, SC	**W** 8–6	**Kopp (5–1)**	Crosswhite (0–3)	**Moskos (10)**	5,617	50–14	3–0

NCAA Clemson Super Regional
Date	Opponent	Rank	Site/stadium	Score	Win	Loss	Save	Attendance	Overall record	SR Record
June 9	Oral Roberts		Doug Kingsmore Stadium • Clemson, SC	**W** 11–8	**Moskos (5–5)**	Jarrett (7–2)	None	5,617	51–14	1–0
June 10	Oral Roberts		Doug Kingsmore Stadium • Clemson, SC	**W** 6–5	**Kopp (6–1)**	Crichton (5–1)	None	5,617	52–14	2–0

NCAA College World Series
Date	Opponent	Rank	Site/stadium	Score	Win	Loss	Save	Attendance	Overall record	CWS record
June 16	Georgia Tech		Johnny Rosenblatt Stadium • Omaha, NE	**W** 8–4	**Hinson (4–0)**	Turner (4–4)	None	16,045	53–14	1–0
June 18	North Carolina		Johnny Rosenblatt Stadium • Omaha, NE	**L** 0–2	Woodard (7–1)	**Faris (9–3)**	None	21,329	53–15	1–1
June 20	Cal State Fullerton		Johnny Rosenblatt Stadium • Omaha, NE	**L** 6–7	Jorgenson (2–0)	**Kopp (6–2)**	Roemer (1)	26,241	53–16	1–2

== Ranking movements ==
Ranking movements Legend: ██ Increase in ranking ██ Decrease in ranking
	Week																				
Poll	Pre	1	2	3	4	5	6	7	8	9	10	11	12	13	14	15	16	17	18	19	Final
Coaches'		*																			6
Baseball America	2	2	1	1	1	2	2	10	9	7	5	6	9	8	7	4	3	3	3	3	5
Collegiate Baseball^	6	5	5	2	1	3	4	13	9	8	7	9	12	9	9	5	3	3	3	3	5
NCBWA†	6	5	4	3	4	4	5	11	9	8	6	6	7	5	4	2	2	2	2	2	5

^ Collegiate Baseball ranked 40 teams in their preseason poll, but only ranked 30 teams weekly during the season.
† NCBWA ranks 30 teams in their preseason poll, but only ranks 25 teams weekly during the season.
* A new poll was not released for this week, so for comparison purposes, the previous week's ranking is inserted in this week's slot.
