= Tague Davis =

American baseball player (born 2005)

Louisville Cardinals
- First baseman
- Born: October 11, 2005 (age 20); Bryn Mawr, Pennsylvania, U.S.
- Bats: Left Throws: Left

Career highlights and awards
- ACC Player of the Year (2026)

Tague Davis (born October 11, 2005) is an American college baseball first baseman for the Louisville Cardinals .

== Career ==
Davis attended Malvern Preparatory School in Malvern, Pennsylvania, where he was a first baseman and pitcher. As a senior, he was the Daily Local News Baseball Player of the Year after hitting .347 with six home runs and 37 runs batted in (RBI) as a batter and went 7-1 with a 1.40 earned run average (ERA) and 62 strikeouts as a pitcher.

As a freshman at Louisville in 2025, Davis started 62 of 64 games and hit .283/.390/.571 with 18 home runs and 52 RBI. His 18 home runs broke the school freshman record and led the ACC. As a sophomore in 2026, he set the school record for home runs in a season with his 26th against Clemson. On May 8, 2026 in a match at Miami, Davis tied the ACC single-season home run record of 31 in the 4th inning, and then broke the record in the top of the 11th. He broke the record in just 51 games vs the previouse record at 61 games.

== Personal life ==
His father Ben Davis and uncle Glenn Davis were both drafted in the 1st round with Ben being drafted 2nd overall in 1995 MLB Draft while his uncle Glenn was drafted 25th overall in 1997 MLB Draft.
