= Bob Seymour (baseball) =

American baseball player (born 1998)

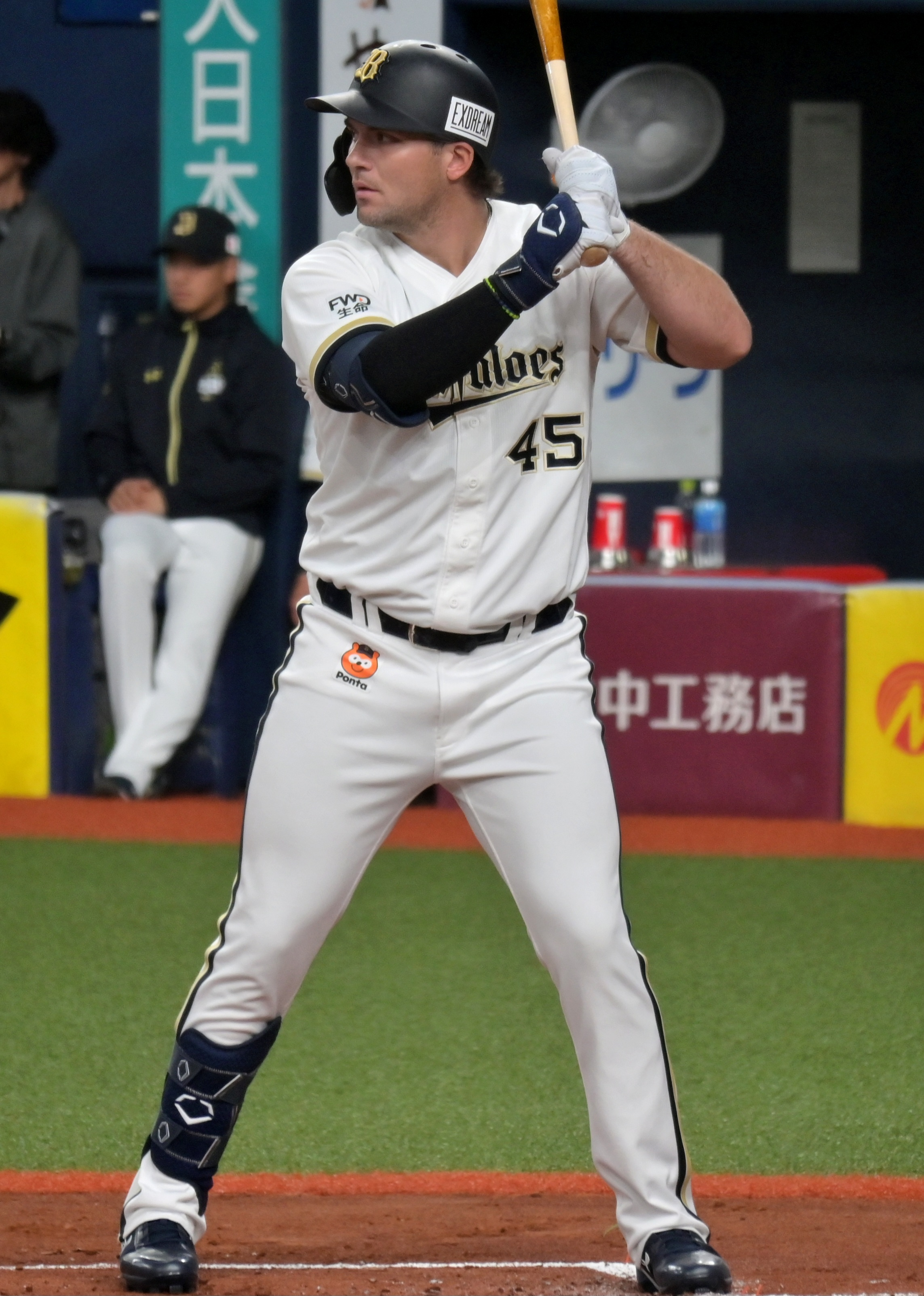
- Seymour with the Orix Buffaloes in 2026

Orix Buffaloes – No. 45
- First baseman
- Born: October 7, 1998 (age 27); Harvey, Illinois, U.S.
- Bats: Left Throws: Right

Professional debut
- MLB: August 15, 2025, for the Tampa Bay Rays
- NPB: March 27, 2026, for the Orix Buffaloes

MLB statistics (through 2025 season)
- Batting average: .205
- Home runs: 1
- Runs batted in: 5

NPB statistics (through August 21, 2026)
- Batting average: .158
- Home runs: 3
- Runs batted in: 15
- Stats at Baseball Reference

Teams
- Tampa Bay Rays (2025); Orix Buffaloes (2026–present)

Robert John Seymour (born October 7, 1998) is an American professional baseball first baseman for the Orix Buffaloes of Nippon Professional Baseball (NPB). He has previously played in Major League Baseball (MLB) for the Tampa Bay Rays.

== Amateur career ==
Seymour grew up in St. John, Indiana and attended Mount Carmel High School in Chicago where he played baseball. As a senior in 2017, he batted .561 with 15 home runs and 48 runs batted in (RBI).

After graduating from Mount Carmel, Seymour enrolled at Wake Forest University and played four seasons of college baseball for the Demon Deacons. As a sophomore in 2019, he hit .377 with nine home runs and 92 RBI over 57 games, earning Atlantic Coast Conference Baseball Player of the Year honors.

His first experience with collegiate summer baseball was in 2018, playing for the St. Cloud Rox of the Northwoods League. In 2019, he played with the Harwich Mariners of the Cape Cod Baseball League. In 2020, he returned to the Northwoods League to play with the Rockford Rivets in a COVID-19 pandemic-restricted pod circuit.

In 2021, he appeared in 47 games for the Demon Deacons and batted .302 with 21 home runs and 55 RBI. After the season, he was selected by the Tampa Bay Rays in the 13th round of the 2021 Major League Baseball draft.

== Professional career ==
=== Tampa Bay Rays ===
Seymour signed with the Rays and made his professional debut with the Florida Complex League Rays, appearing in eight games. In 2022, he played with the Charleston RiverDogs, hitting .281 with 12 home runs and 73 RBI over 95 games. Seymour played with the Complex League Rays, Bowling Green Hot Rods, and Montgomery Biscuits in 2023 and batted .313 with 17 home runs and 55 RBI over 79 games between the three affiliates. Seymour split the 2024 season between Montgomery and the Triple-A Durham Bulls and hit .281 with 28 home runs and 95 RBI across 123 appearances.

Seymour returned to Durham to open the 2025 season, for whom he batted .263/.327/.553 with thirty home runs and 87 RBI over 105 games. The Rays name him their Minor League Player of the Year.

On August 15, 2025, Seymour was selected to the 40-man roster and promoted to the major leagues for the first time. Seymour made his Major League Baseball debut that night. Coincidentally, two other players with the last name Seymour (fellow Ray Ian Seymour and San Francisco Giants player Carson Seymour) also appeared in the same game. Seymour had been teammates with opponent Carson twice before, in summer collegiate ball with both Harwich in 2019 and Rockford in 2020. Seymour recorded his first MLB hit on August 17, an infield single. He hit his first MLB home run, a solo home run, on August 20 at George M. Steinbrenner Field off Luke Weaver of the New York Yankees. In 26 appearances for Tampa Bay during his rookie campaign, Seymour batted .205/.253/.282 with one home run, five RBI, and one stolen bases. Seymour was designated for assignment by the Rays on November 6. He was released on November 12, in order to pursue an opportunity in Asia.

=== Orix Buffaloes ===
On November 14, 2025, Seymour signed with the Orix Buffaloes of Nippon Professional Baseball.
