= Jack Leiter =

American baseball player (born 2000)

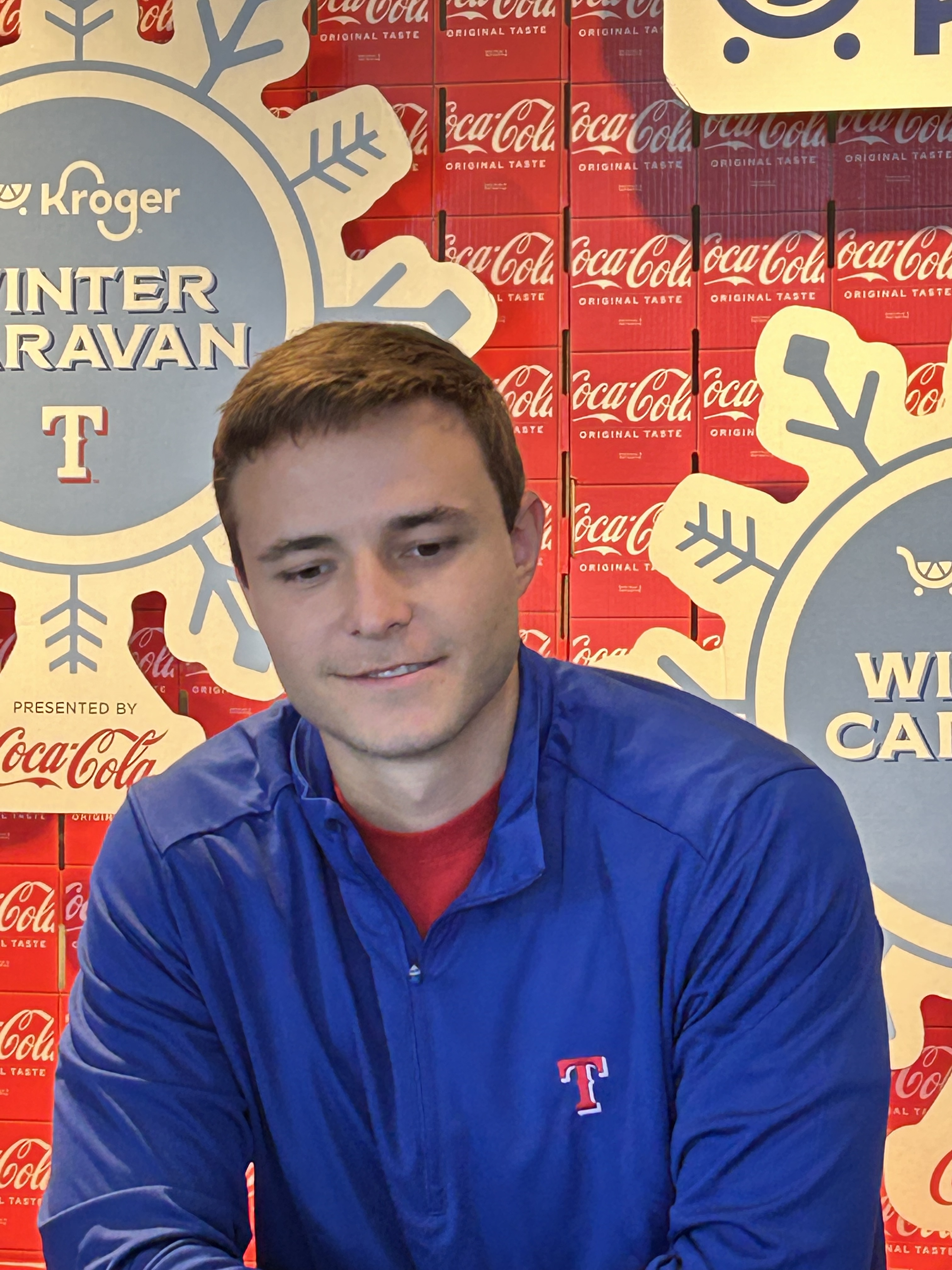
- Leiter at a Rangers fan event in 2025

Texas Rangers – No. 22
- Pitcher
- Born: April 21, 2000 (age 26); Plantation, Florida, U.S.
- Bats: Right Throws: Right

MLB debut
- April 18, 2024, for the Texas Rangers

MLB statistics (through 2026 season)
- Win–loss record: 13–20
- Earned run average: 4.95
- Strikeouts: 262
- Stats at Baseball Reference

Teams
- Texas Rangers (2024–present)

Jack Thomas Leiter (born April 21, 2000) is an American professional baseball pitcher for the Texas Rangers of Major League Baseball (MLB). He played college baseball for the Vanderbilt Commodores and was selected by the Rangers with the second overall pick of the 2021 MLB draft. He made his MLB debut in 2024.

Leiter is the son of former MLB pitcher Al Leiter.

== Early life ==
Raised in Summit, New Jersey, Leiter attended Delbarton School in Morristown, New Jersey, where he played baseball and was teammates with Anthony Volpe. In July 2018, he played in the 2018 Under Armour All-America Baseball Game. In December, he played on the USA Baseball 18U National Team in Panama City during the 2018 COPABE Pan-American Championships, helping Team USA win a gold medal. As a senior at Delbarton in 2019, he was named the Gatorade Player of the Year for the state of New Jersey. At the time of his selection, he was 6–0 with a 0.54 ERA while also batting .364. Leiter was considered a top prospect for the 2019 Major League Baseball draft, but due to his strong commitment to Vanderbilt University, was not selected until the 20th round by the New York Yankees, but did not sign.

== College career ==
He attended Vanderbilt University to play college baseball. In his college debut on February 18, 2020, Leiter pitched five no-hit innings while striking out 12, leading Vanderbilt to a 3–0 victory over the University of South Alabama. He was named the Southeastern Conference (SEC) Co-Freshman of the Week following the performance. Over 15 2/3 innings, Leiter went 2–0 with a 1.72 ERA before the college baseball season was cancelled due to the COVID-19 pandemic. As a redshirt freshman in 2021, Leiter returned as a member of Vanderbilt's starting rotation. On March 20, 2021, he pitched a no-hitter in his SEC debut against South Carolina, compiling sixteen strikeouts. In his next start, he pitched seven no-hit innings against Missouri. He was named the SEC Newcomer of the Year, along with being selected a consensus first-team All-American. He helped lead Vanderbilt to the 2021 College World Series finals and was named to the All-Tournament team. Leiter ended the 2021 season having started 18 games, in which he compiled an 11–4 record, a 2.13 ERA, and 179 strikeouts over 110 innings. He was named the Baseball America 2021 Freshman of the Year.

== Professional career ==
=== Draft and minor leagues ===
The Texas Rangers chose Leiter with the second overall selection in the 2021 Major League Baseball draft. Leiter signed with Texas on July 28, 2021, receiving a $7.92 million signing bonus. Leiter attended an organization draftee orientation at the Rangers spring training complex after signing, but did not appear in a professional game in 2021, instead choosing to return to Vanderbilt to continue college course work.

Leiter opened the 2022 season with the Frisco RoughRiders of the Double-A Texas League. He made his professional debut on April 9, going three innings while allowing one run and striking out seven batters. He was selected to represent the Rangers at the 2022 All-Star Futures Game. Over 23 games (22 starts) with Frisco, Leiter went 3–10 with a 5.54 ERA, 56 walks, and 109 strikeouts over 92 2/3 innings. He received a non-roster invitation to major league spring training in 2023, and returned to Frisco to open the season. Leiter once again struggled in 2023, including spending almost two months out of game action on the development list. With Frisco, he went 2–6 with a 5.06 ERA and 110 strikeouts over 81 1/3 innings. He finished the 2023 season with one start for the Round Rock Express of the Triple-A Pacific Coast League. Leiter returned to Round Rock for the beginning of the 2024 season. He pitched in 17 games for Round Rock and went 6-4 with a 3.51 ERA and 110 strikeouts over 77 innings. After the season, he won the Pacific Coast League Pitcher of the Year Award.

=== Texas Rangers (2024–present) ===
On April 18, 2024, the Rangers selected Leiter’s contract and promoted him to make his major league debut that day against the Detroit Tigers. Making his debut as the Rangers' starting pitcher, he allowed eight hits and seven earned runs with three strikeouts in 3 2/3 innings and earned a no decision as the Rangers ultimately won 9–7. He recorded his first MLB strikeout on three pitches against Riley Greene of the Detroit Tigers, the first batter he faced. Leiter was optioned to Round Rock the next day. He pitched in a total of nine games for the Rangers during the 2024 season and went 0-3 with an 8.83 ERA, 31 strikeouts and 17 walks over 35 2/3 innings.

Leiter was named to the Rangers' Opening Day roster to open the 2025 season. He won a spot in the team's starting rotation alongside former collegiate teammate Kumar Rocker. Leiter earned his first career win in his 2025 debut, allowing one run and striking out four batters in a 4-1 Texas win over the Boston Red Sox. During his second start of the season, he left the game early with a finger blister and was subsequently placed on the injured list. He was activated less than a month later and returned to the Texas rotation. Leiter made a total of 29 starts for the Rangers during the 2025 season and went 10-10 with a 3.86 ERA and 148 strikeouts over 151 2/3 innings.

On June 23, 2026, Leiter underwent arthroscopic surgery to remove a loose body from his right ankle. He was transferred to the 60–day injured list on August 9.

== Personal life ==
Leiter's father, Al Leiter, pitched in MLB for 19 seasons. His uncle, Mark Leiter, and his cousin, Mark Leiter Jr., have also played in MLB. Another cousin, Cam Leiter, is a member of the Los Angeles Dodgers organization.

Leiter graduated from Vanderbilt in December 2023 with a degree in human and organizational development.
