= Tanner Allen =

American baseball player (born 1998)

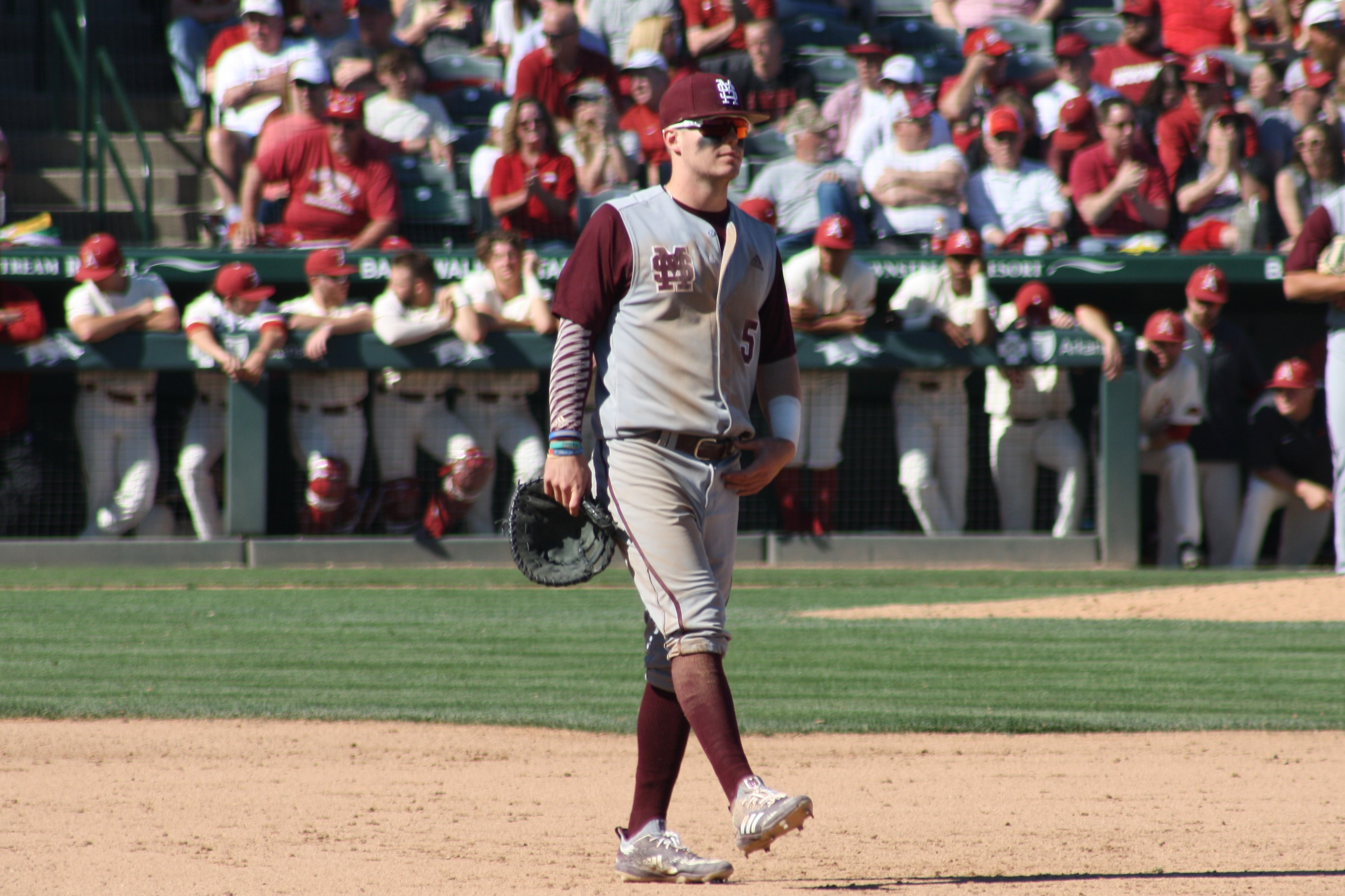

Loco Beach Coconuts – No. 10
- Outfielder
- Born: June 5, 1998 (age 28); Theodore, Alabama, U.S.
- Bats: Left Throws: Right

Tanner Gregory Allen (born June 5, 1998) is an American professional baseball outfielder for the Loco Beach Coconuts of the Banana Ball Championship League.

== Amateur career ==
Allen attended UMS-Wright Preparatory School in Mobile, Alabama, where he played baseball and football. He was selected by the Chicago Cubs in the 36th round of the 2017 Major League Baseball draft but did not sign, instead enrolling at Mississippi State University to play college baseball.

Allen started all 68 games as a freshman for the 2018 Mississippi State Bulldogs baseball team, primarily as a first baseman. He finished the season with a .287 batting average, five home runs, 45 RBIs, and 18 doubles. As a sophomore in 2019, he started 67 games at first base and slashed .349/.426/.516 with seven home runs and 66 RBIs. After the COVID-19 pandemic canceled the 2020 season after playing in only eight games, Allen starred in 2021 when he was named SEC Player of the Year. He was also a consensus All-American and the ABCA National Player of the Year. He was named to the All-Tournament Team of the 2021 College World Series as the Bulldogs won the national title. He finished the 2021 season with a .383/.456/.621 slash line alongside 11 home runs, 66 RBIs, and 11 stolen bases.

== Professional career ==
=== Miami Marlins ===
Allen was selected by the Miami Marlins in the fourth round, with the 118th overall selection, of the 2021 Major League Baseball draft. He signed for $247,500. Allen made his professional debut with the Rookie-level Florida Complex League Marlins and was promoted to the Jupiter Hammerheads of the Low-A Southeast after three games. Over 33 games and 120 at-bats between the two teams, he slashed .183/.259/.275 with two home runs and ten RBI.

Allen opened the 2022 season with the Beloit Sky Carp of the High-A Midwest League. In 84 games split between Beloit and Jupiter, he hit a combined .201/.272/.304 with three home runs and 28 RBI. Allen split the 2023 campaign between Jupiter, Beloit, and the Double–A Pensacola Blue Wahoos. In 94 games for the three affiliates, he slashed .271/.345/.404 with nine home runs, 41 RBI, and eight stolen bases.

Allen began the 2024 campaign with Pensacola, and later made six appearances for Jupiter. In 44 games for Pensacola, he slashed .225/.315/.349 with two home runs, 12 RBI, and four stolen bases. Allen was released by the Marlins organization on August 2, 2024.

=== Loco Beach Coconuts ===
On November 13, 2025, Allen was selected by the Loco Beach Coconuts in the inaugural Banana Ball draft.

== Personal life ==
Allen is the son of Windi and Greg Allen.
