= Brick Smith =

American baseball player (born 1959)

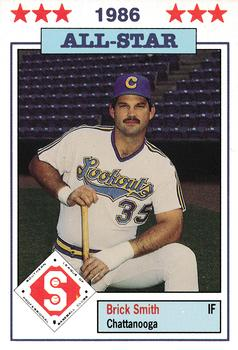
- First baseman
- Born: May 2, 1959 (age 67); Charlotte, North Carolina, U.S.
- Batted: Right Threw: Right

MLB debut
- September 13, 1987, for the Seattle Mariners

Last MLB appearance
- August 23, 1988, for the Seattle Mariners

MLB statistics
- Batting average: .111
- Home runs: 0
- Runs Batted In: 1
- Stats at Baseball Reference

Teams
- Seattle Mariners (1987–1988)

Brick Dudley Smith (born May 2, 1959) is an American former Major League Baseball first baseman who played for the Seattle Mariners in 1987 and 1988.

== Amateur career ==
A native of Charlotte, North Carolina, Smith played college baseball for Wake Forest University. He was named to the All-Atlantic Coast Conference (ACC) team four times. In 1981, he set an ACC record with 18 home runs and was named the conference player of the year. In 1996, he was inducted into the Demon Deacons Hall of Fame, and in 2002, he was named to the ACC 50th anniversary team.

In 1979 and 1980, he played collegiate summer baseball with the Hyannis Mets of the Cape Cod Baseball League (CCBL), helping lead the team to the league championship in 1979, and winning the league's Sportsmanship Award and Thurman Munson Award for batting champion the following season. He was inducted into the CCBL Hall of Fame in 2024.

== Professional career ==
The Mariners selected Smith in the fifth round of the 1981 MLB draft. He was a Northwest League All-Star that year. He was the Chattanooga Lookouts most valuable player in 1986 while leading the Southern League in batting average. Smith made his MLB debut with the Mariners on September 13, 1987, and notched his first major league hit on the final day of the season against Texas Rangers pitcher Steve Howe. Smith appeared in his final MLB game on April 23, 1988. In nine MLB games, he batted 2-for-18. He continued to play in Triple-A through the 1989 season.

== Personal ==
Smith was named after his paternal grandfather who was also named Brick. He currently teaches middle school U.S. History at Providence Day School in Charlotte. According to his bio, "Personal interests outside of school include hunting and fishing. Traveling to pursue these interests is also a passion. Two of my favorite destinations to pursue these sports are Alaska and Maine. A favorite moment was catching a rare white king salmon out of Homer, Alaska."
