= Matheu Nelson =

American baseball player (born 1999)

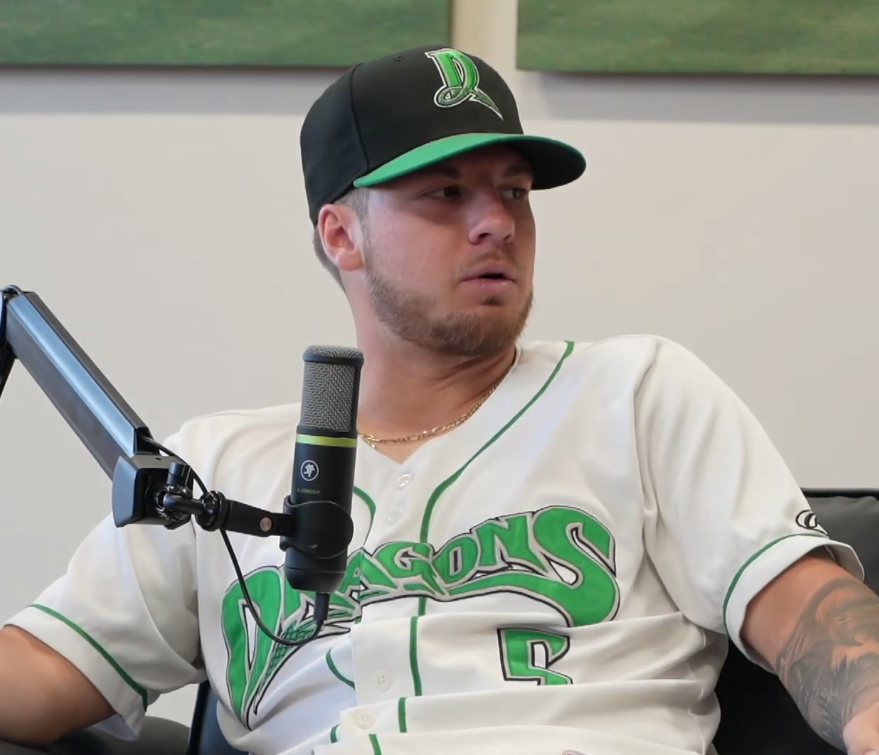
- Nelson with the Dayton Dragons in 2022

Free agent
- Catcher
- Born: January 14, 1999 (age 27); Clearwater, Florida, U.S.
- Bats: Right Throws: Right

Career highlights and awards
- Buster Posey Award (2021); ACC Player of the Year (2021)

Matheu Adam Nelson (born January 14, 1999) is an American professional baseball catcher who is a free agent. He played college baseball for the Florida State Seminoles.

== Amateur career ==
Nelson grew up in Largo, Florida and attended Calvary Christian High School, where one of his coaches was Hall of Fame pitcher Roy Halladay until his death. He was named the Pinellas County Player of the Year after batting .465 with five home runs, 14 doubles and 45 RBIs. Nelson was selected in the 39th round of the 2018 Major League Baseball draft by the Philadelphia Phillies, but opted not to sign with the team.

Nelson batted .282 with six home runs and 29 RBI in 57 games as a freshman. After the 2019 season, he played collegiate summer baseball with the Falmouth Commodores of the Cape Cod Baseball League. Nelson hit .250 with a home run, 14 RBIs and 16 runs scored before his sophomore season was cut short due to the coronavirus pandemic. After the season was canceled, Nelson worked on his conditioning and lost 25 pounds. As a junior in 2021, he started 53 of the Seminoles games and was named the Atlantic Coast Conference Baseball Player of the Year after batting .330 with 17 doubles and a conference-leading 23 home runs. His 23 home runs also tied for the most in NCAA Division I and were the most by a Florida State player since the introduction of the BBCOR standard for bats in 2011. Nelson was also named the National Player of the Year by Perfect Game/Rawlings as well as a first team All-American by the Collegiate Baseball Newspaper and the NCBWA as a catcher and by Baseball America as a designated hitter and won the Buster Posey Award as the nation's best catcher.

== Professional career ==
=== Cincinnati Reds ===
Nelson was selected the 35th overall pick in the 2021 Major League Baseball draft by the Cincinnati Reds. Nelson signed with Cincinnati for a $2.1 million bonus. He made his professional debut with the Rookie-level Arizona Complex League Reds and was later promoted to the Dayton Dragons of the High-A Central. Over ten games and 28 at-bats between the two affiliates, Nelson batted .179 with two doubles. He missed time during the season after being hit in the hand while batting.

Nelson made 82 appearances for Dayton in 2022, hitting .219/.303/.364 with eight home runs, 24 RBI, and one stolen base. He split the 2023 season between Dayton and the Double-A Chattanooga Lookouts, batting a cumulative .229/.340/.437 with 21 home runs, 47 RBI, and six stolen bases across 101 total appearances. Nelson returned to Chattanooga for the 2024 campaign, slashing .198/.328/.287 with four home runs and 21 RBI over 76 games.

Nelson made 29 appearances for Double-A Chattanooga in 2025, hitting .088/.253/.138 with one home run and three RBI. Nelson was released by the Reds organization on July 21, 2025.

=== Lake Country DockHounds ===
On January 6, 2026, Nelson signed with the Lake Country DockHounds of the American Association of Professional Baseball. He was released by the DockHounds on May 18.
