= 2002 ACC tournament =

2002 ACC tournament may refer to:

- 2002 ACC men's basketball tournament
- 2002 ACC women's basketball tournament
- 2002 ACC men's soccer tournament
- 2002 ACC women's soccer tournament
- 2002 Atlantic Coast Conference baseball tournament
- 2002 Atlantic Coast Conference softball tournament
