= 2021 College Baseball All-America Team =

This is a list of college baseball players named first team All-Americans for the 2021 NCAA Division I baseball season. From 2019 to 2023, there were seven generally recognized All-America selectors for baseball: the American Baseball Coaches Association, Baseball America, Collegiate Baseball Newspaper, the College Baseball Foundation, D1Baseball.com, the National Collegiate Baseball Writers Association, and Perfect Game. In order to be considered a "consensus" All-American, a player must have been selected by at least four of these.

== Key ==
A	American Baseball Coaches Association
B	Baseball America
C	Collegiate Baseball Newspaper
F	College Baseball Foundation
D	D1Baseball.com
N	National Collegiate Baseball Writers Association
P	Perfect Game
	Member of the National College Baseball Hall of Fame
	Consensus All-American – selected by all seven organizations
	Consensus All-American – selected by four, five, or six organizations

== All-Americans ==
Position	Name	School	#	A	B	C	F	D	N	P	Other awards and honors
Starting pitcher	Brendan Beck	Stanford	1	✓	—	—	—	—	—	—	
Starting pitcher	Johnathan Lavallee	Long Beach State	1	—	—	✓	—	—	—	—	
Starting pitcher	Jack Leiter	Vanderbilt	7	✓	✓	✓	✓	✓	✓	✓	
Starting pitcher	Ty Madden	Texas	2	—	—	—	—	✓	—	✓	
Starting pitcher	Matt Mikulski	Fordham	3	✓	—	—	—	—	✓	✓	
Starting pitcher	Doug Nikhazy	Ole Miss	6	✓	✓	✓	✓	✓	✓	—	
Starting pitcher	Kumar Rocker	Vanderbilt	7	✓	✓	✓	✓	✓	✓	✓	
Starting pitcher	Nicholas Sinacola	Maine	1	—	—	✓	—	—	—	—	
Starting pitcher	Andrew Taylor	Central Michigan	1	—	—	—	—	—	✓	—	
Starting pitcher	Gavin Williams	East Carolina	6	✓	✓	✓	—	✓	✓	✓	
Relief pitcher	Taylor Broadway	Ole Miss	1	—	—	—	—	—	✓	—	
Relief pitcher	Haylen Green	TCU	1	—	—	—	✓	—	—	—	
Relief pitcher	Nick Jones	Georgia Southern	1	—	—	—	—	—	✓	—	
Relief pitcher	Kevin Kopps	Arkansas	7	✓	✓	✓	✓	✓	✓	✓	Dick Howser Trophy Golden Spikes Award ABCA Pitcher of the Year Baseball America Player of the Year Collegiate Baseball Player of the Year National Pitcher of the Year Stopper of the Year
Relief pitcher	Carson Palmquist	Miami (FL)	2	—	—	—	—	—	✓	✓	
Relief pitcher	Landon Sims	Mississippi State	4	—	✓	—	✓	✓	✓	—	
Catcher	Henry Davis	Louisville	2	✓	✓	—	—	—	—	—	First overall pick in the 2021 MLB draft
Catcher / DH	Matheu Nelson	Florida State	7	✓	✓	✓	✓	✓	✓	✓	Buster Posey Award Johnny Bench Award
First baseman	Will Frizzell	Texas A&M	2	✓	—	—	✓	—	—	—	
First baseman / DH	Tyler Hardman	Oklahoma	3	✓	—	—	—	—	✓	✓	
First baseman	Niko Kavadas	Notre Dame	3	—	✓	—	—	✓	—	✓	
First baseman	Kyle Manzardo	Washington State	1	—	—	✓	—	—	—	—	
Second baseman	Jace Jung	Texas Tech	4	—	—	✓	✓	—	✓	✓	
Second baseman	Connor Norby	East Carolina	3	✓	✓	—	—	✓	—	—	
Shortstop	Ryan Bliss	Auburn	1	—	—	—	—	—	✓	—	
Shortstop	Cal Conley	Texas Tech	1	—	—	—	✓	—	—	—	Brooks Wallace Award
Shortstop	Brooks Lee	Cal Poly	2	—	—	✓	—	✓	—	—	
Shortstop	Trey Sweeney	Eastern Illinois	3	✓	✓	—	—	—	—	✓	
Third baseman	Christian Encarnacion-Strand	Oklahoma State	1	—	—	—	—	—	✓	—	
Third baseman	Austin Knight	Charlotte	2	—	—	✓	—	—	—	✓	
Third baseman	Tyler Locklear	VCU	2	✓	—	—	—	✓	—	—	
Third baseman	Jake Rucker	Tennessee	1	—	—	—	✓	—	—	—	
Third baseman	Hunter Wells	Louisiana Tech	2	✓	✓	—	—	—	—	—	
Outfielder	Tanner Allen	Mississippi State	7	✓	✓	✓	✓	✓	✓	✓	ABCA Position Player of the Year
Outfielder	Enrique Bradfield	Vanderbilt	3	✓	—	—	✓	—	✓	—	
Outfielder	Colton Cowser	Sam Houston State	3	—	✓	—	—	✓	—	✓	
Outfielder	Kyler Fedko	UConn	1	—	—	—	—	—	✓	—	
Outfielder	Quincy Hamilton	Wright State	3	✓	—	✓	—	✓	—	—	
Outfielder	Mason McWhorter	Georgia Southern	2	—	—	✓	—	—	✓	—	
Outfielder	Donta Williams	Arizona	1	✓	—	—	—	—	—	—	
Outfielder / DH	Aaron Zavala	Oregon	6	✓	✓	—	✓	✓	✓	✓	
Designated hitter	Jacob Berry	Arizona	3	✓	—	✓	—	—	✓	—	
Designated hitter	Wes Clarke	South Carolina	1	—	—	—	✓	—	—	—	
Utility player	Spencer Schwellenbach	Nebraska	4	✓	—	—	✓	✓	—	✓	John Olerud Award
Utility player	Paul Skenes	Air Force	3	—	✓	✓	—	—	✓	—	

== See also ==
- List of college baseball awards
