= Clemson Tigers baseball =

Division 1 college baseball team

Clemson Tigers
- 2026 Clemson Tigers baseball team
- Founded: 1896; 130 years ago
- University: Clemson University
- Head coach: Erik Bakich (4th season)
- Conference: ACC
- Location: Clemson, South Carolina
- Home stadium: Doug Kingsmore Stadium (capacity: 6,346)
- Nickname: Tigers
- Colors: Orange and regalia

College World Series appearances
- 1958, 1959, 1976, 1977, 1980, 1991, 1995, 1996, 2000, 2002, 2006, 2010

NCAA regional champions
- 1976, 1977, 1980, 1991, 1995, 1996, 1999, 2000, 2001, 2002, 2005, 2006, 2007, 2009, 2010, 2024

NCAA tournament appearances
- 1947, 1950, 1958, 1959, 1967, 1975, 1976, 1977, 1978, 1979, 1980, 1981, 1987, 1988, 1989, 1990, 1991, 1992, 1993, 1994, 1995, 1996, 1997, 1998, 1999, 2000, 2001, 2002, 2003, 2004, 2005, 2006, 2007, 2009, 2010, 2011, 2012, 2013, 2014, 2015, 2016, 2017, 2018, 2019, 2023, 2024, 2025

Conference tournament champions
- 1976, 1978, 1980, 1981, 1989, 1991, 1993, 1994, 2006, 2016, 2023

Conference regular season champions
- SoCon: 1947; ACC: 1954, 1958, 1959, 1967, 1973, 1974, 1975, 1976, 1977, 1978, 1979, 1981, 1982, 1984, 1985, 1988, 1991, 1992, 1994, 1995, 2006, 2018, 2024; ACC (Atlantic Division): 2006, 2010, 2018, 2024

The Clemson Tigers baseball team represents Clemson University in NCAA Division I college baseball. The team participates in the Atlantic Division of the Atlantic Coast Conference. The Tigers are currently coached by head coach Erik Bakich and play their home games in Doug Kingsmore Stadium. The program has reached the NCAA tournament in all but three seasons dating back to 1987. Clemson has made 12 appearances in the College World Series with an all-time record of 12–24 in Omaha.

The team has a heated in-state rivalry with the University of South Carolina. Mark Etheridge of SEBaseball.com has called it "college baseball's most heated rivalry," and Aaron Fitt of Baseball America has called it "far and away the most compelling rivalry college baseball has to offer." As of March 2, 2025, The Clemson Tigers lead the all-time series 193–146–2.

== Year-by-year results ==
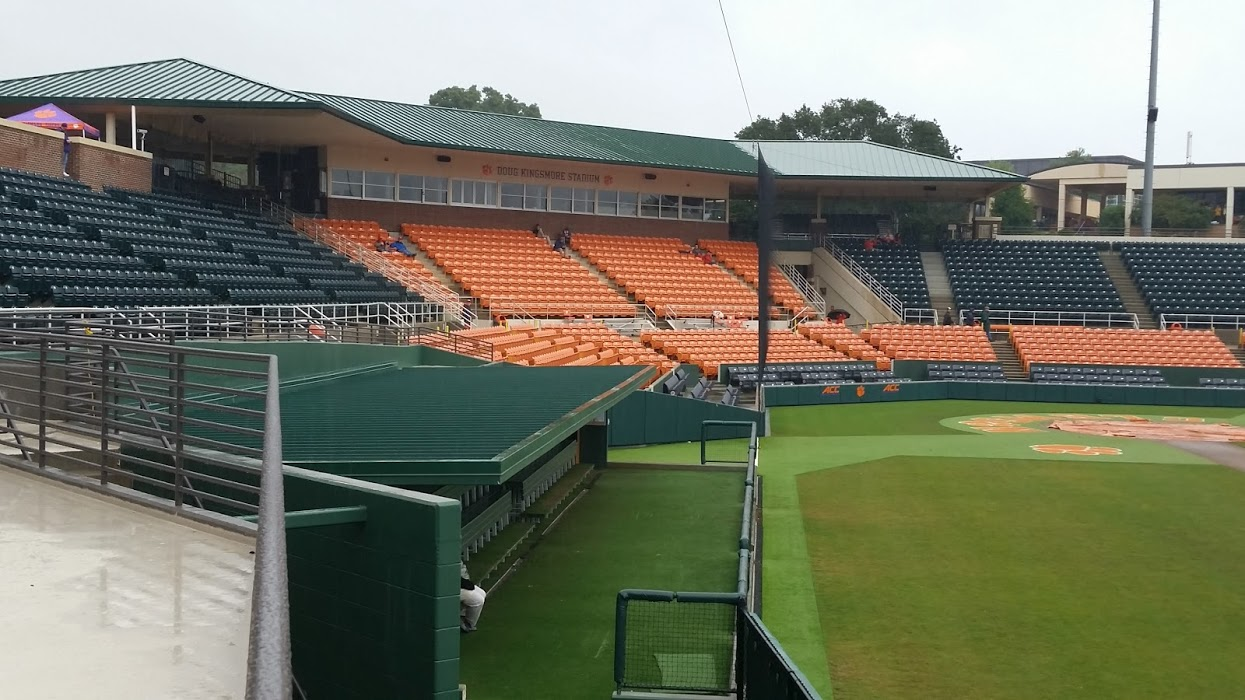
Doug Kingsmore Stadium

Season	Coach	Overall	Conference	Standing	Postseason
2017	Monte Lee	42–21	17–13	3rd, Atlantic	NCAA Clemson Regional
2018	Monte Lee	47–16	22–8	1st, Atlantic	NCAA Clemson Regional
2019	Monte Lee	35–26	15–15	4th, Atlantic	NCAA Oxford Regional
2020	Monte Lee	14–3	3–0	T–1st, Atlantic	NCAA Cancelled
2021	Monte Lee	25–27	16–20	5th, Atlantic	—
2022	Monte Lee	35–23	13–16	6th, Atlantic	—
2023	Erik Bakich	44–19	20–10	2nd, Atlantic	NCAA Clemson Regional
2024	Erik Bakich	44–16	20–10	1st, Atlantic	NCAA Clemson Regional Champions; NCAA Clemson Super Regional
2025	Erik Bakich	45–18	18–12	5th	NCAA Clemson Regional
2026	Erik Bakich	31–26	10–20	15th	—
National Champion Conference Regular Season Champion Conference Tournament Champion Conference Regular Season & Conference Tournament Champion Conference Division Champion

== Award winners ==
=== Dick Howser Trophy ===
Dick Howser Trophy winners
Year	Player	Position
1996	Kris Benson	P
2002	Khalil Greene	SS
2016	Seth Beer	OF

=== Golden Spikes Award ===
Golden Spikes Award winners
Year	Player	Position
2002	Khalil Greene	SS

=== Conference awards ===
- ACC Player of the Year – Craig White (1973), Steve Cline (1974), Denny Walling (1975), Chuck Porter (1976), Jim McCollom (1985), Chuck Baldwin (1986), Brian Barnes (1989), Brian Kowitz (1990), Shane Monahan (1995), Kris Benson (1996), Khalil Greene (2002), Brad Miller (2011), Seth Beer (2016), Max Wagner (2022)

== Current MLB players ==
Current Tigers in the MLB as of July 2025:

- Carson Spiers - Pitcher, Cincinnati Reds
- Spencer Strider - Pitcher, Atlanta Braves
- Eli White - Outfielder, Atlanta Braves
- Weston Wilson - Infielder, Philadelphia Phillies
- Logan Davidson - Infielder, Oakland Athletics
- Justin Wrobleski - Pitcher, Los Angeles Dodgers

== Current Minor League players ==
Current Tigers in the Minor Leagues as of July 2025:

- Billy Amick - Third basemen, Cedar Rapids Kernels, Minnesota Twins
- Ryan Ammons - Relief Pitcher, Brooklyn Cyclones, New York Mets
- Keyshawn Askew - Relief Pitcher, Montgomery Biscuits, Tampa Bay Rays
- Seth Beer - Outfielder, Reading Fighting Phils, Philadelphia Phillies
- Brooks Crawford - Relief Pitch/Left Outfielder, Chattanooga Lookouts, Cincinnati Reds
- Geoffrey Gilbert - Relief Pitcher, Hudson Valley Renegades, New York Yankees
- Austin Gordon - Pitcher, Rocket City Trash Pandas, Los Angeles Angels
- Adam Hackenberg - Catcher, Charlotte Knights, Chicago White Sox
- Jake Higginbotham - Relief Pitcher, El Paso Chihuahuas, San Diego Padres
- Jacob Hinderleider - Infielder, Fresno Grizzlies, Colorado Rockies
- Cooper Ingle - Designated Hitter/Catcher/Outfielder, Akron Rubberducks, Cleveland Guardians
- Holt Jones - Relief Pitcher, Beloit Sky Carp, Miami Marlins
- P.J. Labriola - Relief Pitcher, Florida Complex League, Boston Red Sox
- Ryan Miller - Pitcher, Toledo Mud Hens, Detroit Tigers
- Jimmy Obertop - Catcher and 1B, Fresno Grizzlies, Colorado Rockies
- Chris Okey - Catcher, Oklahoma City Comets, Los Angeles Dodgers
- Rocco Reid - Relief Pitcher, Visalia Rawhide, Arizona Diamondbacks
- Davis Sharpe - Relief Pitcher and 1B, Akron Rubberducks, Cleveland Guardians
- Tristan Smith - Pitcher, Daytona Dragons, Cincinnati Reds
- Will Taylor - Outfielder, Greensboro Grasshoppers, Pittsburgh Pirates
- Bryce Teodosio - Outfielder, Salt Lake Bees, Los Angeles Angels
- Max Wagner - Third Basemen, Chesapeake Baysox, Baltimore Orioles
- Sam Weatherly - Relief Pitch and Left Outfielder Hartford Yard Goats, Colorado Rockies
- Chris Williams - Infielder, Syracuse Mets, New York Mets
- Blake Wright - Infielder, Fresno Grizzlies, Colorado Rockies

== Prominent players ==
Player	Position	Years at Clemson	Major League Teams
Jeff Baker	3B/SS	2000–02	Colorado Rockies (2005–2009), Chicago Cubs (2009–2012), Detroit Tigers (August 5, 2012 – August 31, 2012), Atlanta Braves (August 2012 – January 2013), Texas Rangers (2013), Miami Marlins (2014–15)
Brian Barnes	LHP	1986–89	Montreal Expos (1990–93), Cleveland Indians (1994), Los Angeles Dodgers (1994)
Seth Beer	DH/1B	2016–2018	Arizona Diamondbacks (2021–22)
Kris Benson	RHP	1995–96	Pittsburgh Pirates (1999–2004), New York Mets (2004–05), Baltimore Orioles (2006), Texas Rangers (2009), Arizona Diamondbacks (2010)
Jerry Brooks	3B	1986–88	Los Angeles Dodgers (1993), Florida Marlins (1996)
Mike Brown	RHP	1978–80	Boston Red Sox (1982–86), Seattle Mariners (1986–87)
Ty Cline	OF	1959–60	Cleveland Indians (1960–62), Milwaukee Braves (1963–67), Chicago Cubs (1966), San Francisco Giants (1967–68), Montreal Expos (1969–70), Cincinnati Reds (1970–71)
Tyler Colvin	OF	2004–06	Chicago Cubs (2009–2011), Colorado Rockies (2012–2013), San Francisco Giants (2014)
John Curtis	LHP	1968	Boston Red Sox (1970–73), St. Louis Cardinals (1974–76), San Francisco Giants (1977–79), San Diego Padres (1980–82), California Angels (1982–84)
Mark Davidson	OF	1982	Minnesota Twins (1986–88), Houston Astros (1989–91)
Steven Duggar	OF	2013–15	San Francisco Giants (2018–22), Texas Rangers (2022), Los Angeles Angels (2022)
Rusty Gerhardt	LHP	1969–72	San Diego Padres (1974)
Khalil Greene	SS/3B	2000–02	San Diego Padres (2003–2008), St. Louis Cardinals (2009)
Bert Heffernan	C	1985–88	Seattle Mariners (1992)
Mike Holtz	LHP	1991–94	Anaheim Angels (1996–01), Oakland Athletics (2002), San Diego Padres (2002)
Jimmy Key	LHP	1980–82	Toronto Blue Jays (1984–92), New York Yankees (1993–96), Baltimore Orioles (1997–98)
Billy Koch	RHP	1994–96	Toronto Blue Jays (1999–01), Oakland Athletics (2002), Chicago White Sox (2003–04), Florida Marlins (2004)
Brian Kowitz	OF	1988–90	Atlanta Braves (1995)
Tyler Krieger	IF	2012–15	
Joe Landrum	RHP	1946–47	Brooklyn Dodgers (1950–52)
Matthew LeCroy	DH	1995–97	Minnesota Twins (2000–05, 2007), Washington Nationals (2006)
John McMakin	LHP	1900–01	Brooklyn Dodgers (1902)
Norm McMillan	3B	1915–17	New York Yankees (1922), Boston Red Sox (1923), St. Louis Browns (1924), Chicago Cubs (1928–29)
Billy McMillon	OF	1991–93	Florida Marlins (1996–97), Philadelphia Phillies (1997), Detroit Tigers (2000–01), Oakland Athletics (2001, 2003–04)
Mike Milchin	LHP	1986–89	Minnesota Twins (1996), Baltimore Orioles (1996)
Brad Miller	SS	2009–11	Seattle Mariners (2013–2015), Tampa Bay Rays (2016–2018), Milwaukee Brewers (2018), Cleveland Indians (2019), Philadelphia Phillies (2019, 2021), St. Louis Cardinals (2020)
Shane Monahan	OF	1993–95	Seattle Mariners (1998–99)
Ron Musselman	RHP	1976–77	Seattle Mariners (1982), Toronto Blue Jays (1984–85)
Billy O'Dell	LHP	1952–54	Baltimore Orioles (1954, 1956–59), San Francisco Giants (1960–64), Milwaukee Braves (1965–66), Pittsburgh Pirates (1966–67)
John Pawlowski	RHP	1983–85	Chicago White Sox (1987–88)
Chuck Porter	RHP	1974–76	Milwaukee Brewers (1981–85)
Flint Rhem	RHP	1923–24	St. Louis Cardinals (1924–28, 1930–32, 1934, 1936), Philadelphia Phillies (1932–33), Boston Braves (1934–35)
Bill Schroeder	C	1977–79	Milwaukee Brewers (1983–88), California Angels (1989–90)
Kurt Seibert	SS	1974–76	Chicago Cubs (1979)
Danny Sheaffer	C	1980	Boston Red Sox (1987), Cleveland Indians (1989), Colorado Rockies (1993–94), St. Louis Cardinals (1995–97)
Richie Shaffer	3B	2009–12	Tampa Bay Rays (2015–16)
Tony Sipp	LHP	2004	Cleveland Indians (2009–2012), Arizona Diamondbacks (2013), Houston Astros (2014–2018), Washington Nationals (2019)
Vet Sitton	RHP	1901–03	Cleveland Indians (1909)
Brian Snyder	LHP	1977–79	Seattle Mariners (1985), Oakland Athletics (1989)
Bill Spiers	SS	1985–87	Milwaukee Brewers (1989–94), New York Mets (1995), Houston Astros (1996–01)
Harold Stowe	LHP	1957–59	New York Yankees (1960)
Tim Teufel	2B	1979–80	Minnesota Twins (1983–85), New York Mets (1985–91), San Diego Padres (1991–93)
Ken Vining	LHP	1994–96	Chicago White Sox (2001)
Denny Walling	1B/3B	1975	Oakland Athletics (1975–76), Houston Astros (1977–88, 1992), St. Louis Cardinals (1988–90), Texas Rangers (1991)
Matt White	LHP	1996–98	Boston Red Sox (2003), Seattle Mariners (2003), Washington Nationals (2005)
Keith Williams	OF	1991–93	San Francisco Giants (1996)
Scott Winchester	RHP	1993–95	Cincinnati Reds (1997–98, 2000–01)

== See also ==
- List of NCAA Division I baseball programs
