= Bert Heffernan =

American baseball player (born 1965)

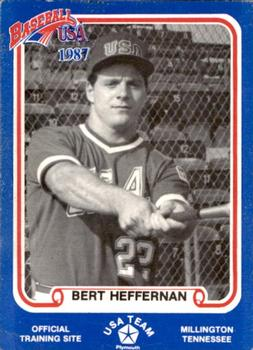
- Catcher
- Born: March 3, 1965 (age 61); Centereach, New York, U.S.
- Batted: Left Threw: Right

MLB debut
- May 13, 1992, for the Seattle Mariners

Last MLB appearance
- June 4, 1992, for the Seattle Mariners

MLB statistics
- Batting average: .091
- Home runs: 0
- Runs batted in: 1
- Stats at Baseball Reference

Teams
- Seattle Mariners (1992)

Bertram Alexander Heffernan (born March 3, 1965) is an American former professional baseball player who played for in 8 games for the Seattle Mariners of Major League Baseball (MLB) in 1992. Heffernan was an All-American catcher in college for the Clemson Tigers. He played for the Sinon Bulls in the Chinese Professional Baseball League in 1997 and 1998.

== Amateur career ==
A native of Centereach, New York, Heffernan began playing catcher at 8 years old. He played college baseball for Clemson from 1985 to 1988. He ranks highly in many program statistics, finishing his career third in hits (335), fifth in doubles (63), tied for seventh in triples (14), and sixth with 507 total bases. Heffernan excelled his senior campaign, hitting .337 with 93 runs scored, 18 doubles, 21 stolen bases and 62 walks to just 27 strikeouts, earning him a first team All-American selection from the American Baseball Coaches Association.

In 1986, he played collegiate summer baseball with the Orleans Cardinals of the Cape Cod Baseball League. In 1987, he was named to the U.S. collegiate national team that competed in the Pan Am Games, though he did not participate in the tournament.

In 2002, he was inducted into the Clemson Hall of Fame.

== Professional career ==
Heffernan was drafted by the Milwaukee Brewers in the 9th round of the 1988 Major League Baseball draft and signed on June 2, 1988. He was a Pioneer League All-Star with the Helena Brewers that summer and a Midwest League All-Star in 1989. The Brewers traded Heffernan to the Los Angeles Dodgers on December 20, 1990 for pitcher Darren Holmes. The Seattle Mariners selected Heffernan in the Triple-A portion of the 1991 Rule 5 Draft.

Heffernan made his MLB debut on May 13, 1992, starting at catcher, and hit a double, his only MLB hit. He was sent down later in May but returned to the majors to play one final game on June 4.

Heffernan played in the San Francisco Giants minor league system in 1993, also suffering torn ankle ligaments. Unable to find a catching job in 1994, he worked as a doorman at a restaurant in Boston. He was a replacement player with the Montreal Expos in spring training in 1995 during the ongoing players strike. He played for the Triple-A Ottawa Lynx, also serving as a minor league coach. He returned to the Lynx in 1996, then played two seasons for the Sinon Bulls in the Chinese Professional Baseball League in Taiwan. Heffernan was also a coach for the Cape Fear Crocs in 1998 and Jupiter Hammerheads in 1999, both Expos minor league affiliates. Heffernan was a player-coach for the Long Island Ducks of the independent Atlantic League in 2000.

== Personal life ==
Heffernan also competed in football and wrestling in high school.
