= Max Wagner (baseball) =

American baseball player (born 2001)

Texas Rangers
- Third baseman
- Born: August 19, 2001 (age 25); Green Bay, Wisconsin, U.S.
- Bats: Right Throws: Right

Career highlights and awards
- ACC Player of the Year (2022)

Maxwell Marvin David Wagner (born August 19, 2001) is an American professional baseball third baseman in the Texas Rangers organization. He played college baseball for the Clemson Tigers, and was selected by the Baltimore Orioles in the second round of the 2022 Major League Baseball draft.

== Amateur career ==
Wagner grew up in Green Bay, Wisconsin and attended Preble High School. He was named the Wisconsin Gatorade Baseball Player of the Year as a senior. Wagner played summer collegiate baseball after graduating high school for the Green Bay Booyah of the Northwoods League.

Wagner played in 35 games with 22 starts at third base during his freshman season and batted .214 with five doubles, two home runs, nine RBIs, and 16 runs scored. He returned to Green Bay after the season and was named a league All-Star. Wagner altered his swing during the summer. In his two seasons in Green Bay, he hit .285 with six home runs and 22 runs batted in. He had an OPS of .923 in 175 plate appearances. He was named the Atlantic Coast Conference (ACC) Player of the Week twice in a row during his sophomore season. Wagner was named the Atlantic Coast Conference Baseball Player of the Year at the end of the regular season.

== Professional career ==
=== Baltimore Orioles ===
The Baltimore Orioles selected Wagner 42nd overall in the 2022 Major League Baseball draft. He signed with the Orioles on July 26, 2022, and received a $1.9 million signing bonus. Wagner split his first professional season between the rookie-level Florida Complex League Orioles, Single-A Delmarva Shorebirds, and High-A Aberdeen IronBirds, batting .243 with one home run and 11 RBI in 19 total games.

Wagner split the 2023 season between Aberdeen and the Double-A Bowie Baysox, playing in 107 total games and hitting .239/.342/.405 with 13 home runs, 54 RBI, and 27 stolen bases. In 2024, he played in 25 games for Bowie, Aberdeen, and the FCL Orioles due to injury. In 97 plate appearances for the three affiliates, Wagner slashed .151/.247/.256 with two home runs, five RBI, and three stolen bases.

Wagner made 87 appearances for the Double-A Chesapeake Baysox during the 2025 season, batting .218/.301/.339 with five home runs, 27 RBI, and seven stolen bases. On March 20, 2026, Wagner was released by the Orioles organization.

=== Texas Rangers ===
On April 21, 2026, Wagner signed a minor league contract with the Texas Rangers. He elected free agency on November 2.

On November 11, 2026, Wagner re-signed with the Rangers on a new minor league contract for the 2027 season.
