= Hal Stowe =

American baseball player (born 1937)

- Pitcher
- Born: August 29, 1937 (age 89); Gastonia, North Carolina, U.S.
- Batted: Left Threw: Left

MLB debut
- September 30, 1960, for the New York Yankees

Last MLB appearance
- September 30, 1960, for the New York Yankees

MLB statistics
- Win–loss record: 0–0
- Earned run average: 9.00
- Strikeouts: 0
- Stats at Baseball Reference

Teams
- New York Yankees (1960)

Harold Rudolph Stowe (born August 29, 1937) is an American former professional baseball pitcher. Following his college baseball career with the Clemson Tigers, Stowe played in Major League Baseball for the New York Yankees in 1960.

== Amateur career ==
Stowe is from Gastonia, North Carolina. He played in American Legion Baseball and led his team to the national finals in 1954. He attended Belmont High School in Belmont, North Carolina, and played for their baseball team.

Stowe enrolled at Clemson University and played college baseball for the Clemson Tigers. As a junior in 1958, Stowe set school records with 14 wins, 21 games pitched, 15 games started, 126 2/3 innings pitched, and 126 strikeouts. His wins and strikeouts were the most in college baseball that season. Used as a stopper in 1959, he pitched in 19 of Clemson's 32 games. Stowe pitched for the Tigers in the 1959 College World Series (CWS), and was named to the All-Tournament Team. For his collegiate career, Stowe had a 24–13 win–loss record and a 2.32 earned run average (ERA).

== Professional career ==
Days after the 1959 CWS ended, the New York Yankees signed Stowe as an amateur free agent for a bonus reported to be above $20,000 ($220,890 in current dollar terms). He reported to the Greensboro Yankees of the Class B Carolina League. Stowe also played for the Fargo-Moorhead Twins of the Class C Northern League and was assigned to the Florida Instructional League after the season.

In 1960, Stowe pitched for the Amarillo Gold Sox of the Class AA Texas League, and had a 15–3 win–loss record and a 3.43 ERA. Stowe appeared in one major league game, on September 30, 1960, pitching one inning against the Boston Red Sox. He was optioned to the Richmond Virginians of the Class AAA International League in 1961, but was demoted to Amarillo during the season. He also pitched for Richmond in 1962 and 1963.

In 1964, the Yankees released Stowe, and he signed with the Minnesota Twins, who assigned him to the Charlotte Hornets of the Class AA Southern League. On July 11, he came into a tie game with two out and a runner on base. He picked off the baserunner, ending the inning without throwing a pitch, and earned the win after the team scored the go-ahead run in the next inning. Stowe retired after the season.

== Personal life ==
Stowe married Betty Jean Taylor on December 22, 1956.

After his baseball career, Stowe operated his family restaurant in Gastonia. He was inducted into the Clemson Tiger Athletic Hall of Fame in 1979. The Clemson Tigers annually give the Hal Stowe Most Valuable Player Award to its top pitcher.
