= Carson Spiers =

American baseball player (born 1997)

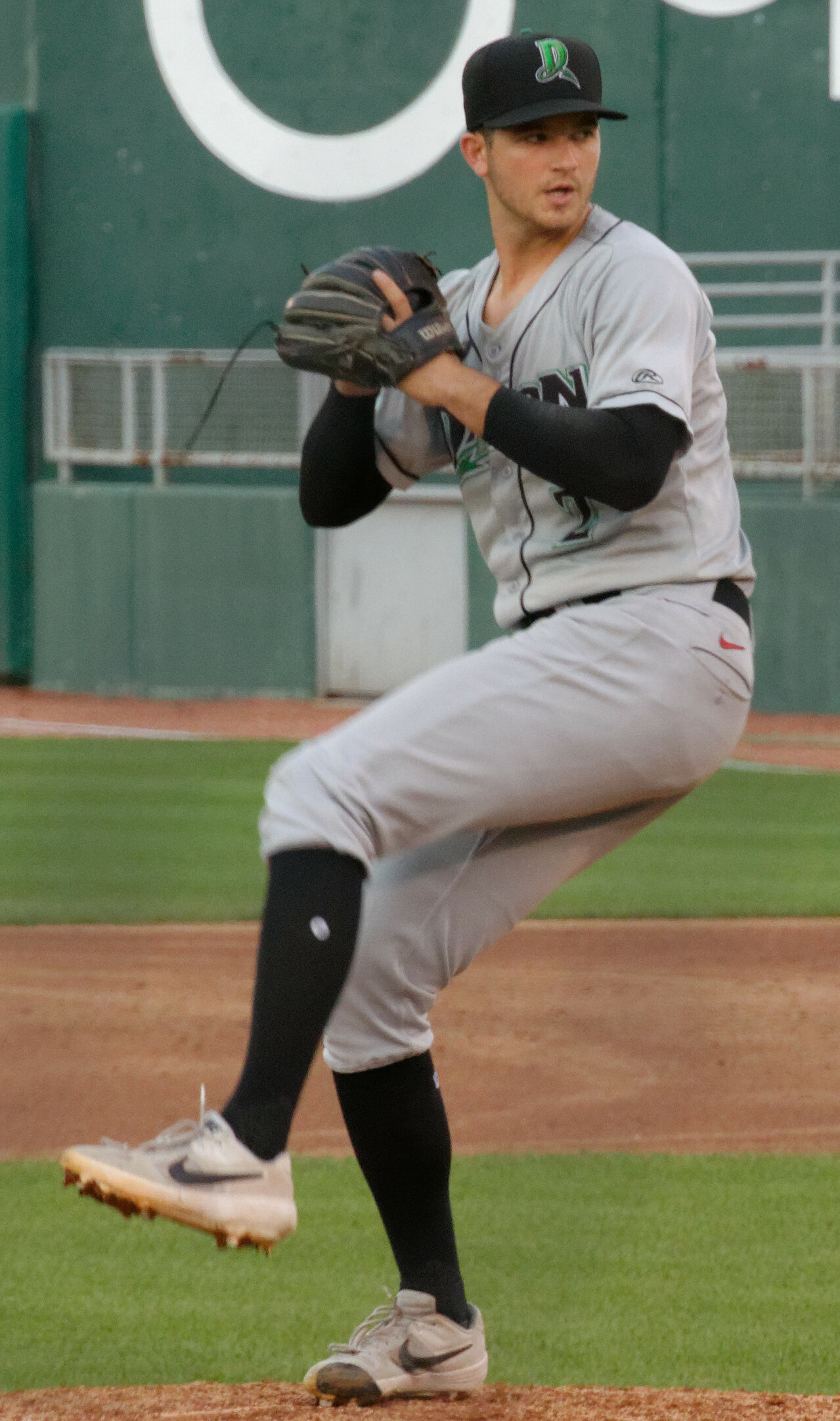
- Spiers with the Dayton Dragons in 2021

Cincinnati Reds – No. 68
- Pitcher
- Born: November 11, 1997 (age 28); Greenville, South Carolina, U.S.
- Bats: Right Throws: Right

MLB debut
- September 3, 2023, for the Cincinnati Reds

MLB statistics (through 2026 season)
- Win–loss record: 5–10
- Earned run average: 5.78
- Strikeouts: 109
- Stats at Baseball Reference

Teams
- Cincinnati Reds (2023–present)

William Carson Spiers (born November 11, 1997) is an American professional baseball pitcher for the Cincinnati Reds of Major League Baseball (MLB).

== Amateur career ==
Spiers attended Greenville High School in Greenville, South Carolina, where he played baseball as a third baseman and American football as a quarterback. Colleges recruited him for both sports.

Spiers enrolled at Clemson University and played college baseball for the Clemson Tigers. He made three appearances as a pitcher in 2017, his freshman year. The next season, he had a 2.08 earned run average (ERA) as a middle reliever. In 2018, he played collegiate summer baseball with the Falmouth Commodores of the Cape Cod Baseball League, where he had a 0.84 ERA. He became Clemson's closer in 2019. In his collegiate career, from 2017 to 2020, Spiers had a 7–7 win–loss record, a 2.47 ERA, 19 saves and 103 strikeouts in 109 1/3 innings pitched, all as a relief pitcher.

== Professional career ==
The Cincinnati Reds signed Spiers as a free agent after he went unselected in the shortened 2020 Major League Baseball draft. However, he did not play in a game due to the cancellation of the minor league season because of the COVID-19 pandemic. Spiers made his professional debut in 2021, spending the year split between the Single–A Daytona Tortugas and High–A Dayton Dragons. In 25 total games (20 starts), he registered an 8–4 record and 3.55 ERA with 130 strikeouts across 111 2/3 innings of work.

In 2022, Spiers split the season between Double–A and the Triple–A Louisville Bats. In 27 games (23 starts) between the two affiliates, he posted a 4–6 record and 5.33 ERA with 105 strikeouts across 121 2/3 innings pitched. After alternating as a starting pitcher and relief pitcher early in his career, Spiers became a full-time relief pitcher with the Chattanooga Lookouts of the Double-A Southern League in 2023.

On September 1, 2023, the Reds promoted Spiers to the major leagues as a COVID-19 substitute. He made his MLB debut on September 3. In two starts for the Reds, he allowed seven runs on ten hits and five walks with eight strikeouts in seven innings pitched. On September 10, the Reds returned Spiers to the minor leagues. On September 14, the Reds selected Spiers to the 40-man roster and promoted him to the major leagues. In four total appearances for Cincinnati, he logged a 6.92 ERA with 12 strikeouts across 13 innings pitched.

Spiers was optioned to Triple–A Louisville to begin the 2024 season. He made 22 appearances (10 starts) for Cincinnati during the regular season, compiling a 5-7 record and 5.46 ERA with 80 strikeouts across 90 2/3 innings pitched.

Spiers made three appearances for Cincinnati to begin the 2025 campaign, struggling to an 0–2 record and 6.08 ERA with 11 strikeouts across 13 1/3 innings pitched. On April 20, 2025, Spiers was placed on the injured list with a right shoulder impingement syndrome. He was transferred to the 60-day injured list on May 23. On July 26, it was announced that Spiers had suffered a UCL injury during his rehabilitation, which necessitated season-ending surgery. He was designated for assignment by the Reds on November 18. On November 21, Spiers was non-tendered by Cincinnati and became a free agent.

On November 24, 2025, Spiers re-signed with the Reds organization on a minor league contract. After returning from surgery, he recorded a 3.75 ERA with 30 strikeouts across five starts split between Dayton and Louisville. On September 20, 2026, the Reds selected Spiers' contract, adding him to their active roster.

== Personal life ==
Spiers' uncle, Bill Spiers, played baseball for Clemson and in the major leagues. His father, Michael, and grandfather, Bud, also played baseball for the Clemson Tigers, while his cousin, Will, was the punter for their American football team.
