= Bill Spiers =

American baseball player (born 1966)

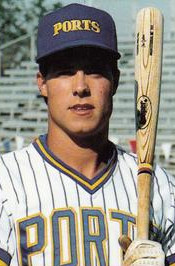
- Spiers in 1988
- Infielder
- Born: June 5, 1966 (age 60); Orangeburg, South Carolina, U.S.
- Batted: Left Threw: Right

MLB debut
- April 7, 1989, for the Milwaukee Brewers

Last MLB appearance
- April 8, 2001, for the Houston Astros

MLB statistics
- Batting average: .271
- Home runs: 37
- Runs batted in: 388
- Stats at Baseball Reference

Teams
- Milwaukee Brewers (1989–1994); New York Mets (1995); Houston Astros (1996–2001)

William James Spiers III (born June 5, 1966) is an American former professional baseball player, and a college football coach. He also served as the director of special teams for Clemson University.

Spiers played Major League Baseball as a shortstop and third baseman from 1989 to 2001 for the Milwaukee Brewers, New York Mets, and Houston Astros.

== Career ==
Spiers was a punter for Clemson University. He was a first-round draft pick (13th overall) in the 1987 amateur draft. He debuted in the majors two years later with the Milwaukee Brewers on April 7, 1989. He played 114 games in his rookie season, batting .255 while mostly playing at shortstop. In five further seasons, he never played more than 135 games in a season while playing away from shortstop after 1992. He was claimed off waivers by the Mets in the 1994 offseason and batted .208 in 63 games. He then became a free agent and signed with the Astros in 1996 and played with the team for the next six seasons, playing mostly at third base. He batted a career high .320 in 132 games of the 1997 season. For his baseball career, he is known for his walk off single against Trevor Hoffman and the San Diego Padres in game 2 of the 1998 1998 National League Division Series, which was the first playoff win for the team in eleven years.

On September 24, 1999, while playing with the Astros against the Brewers at Milwaukee County Stadium, Spiers was attacked by a 23-year-old man while standing in the outfield before the bottom of the 6th inning. Teammate Mike Hampton was first on the scene and delivered several kicks to the attacker. He was later quoted saying "The good thing was he didn't have a weapon... I always check right field before I deliver the first pitch. It's just a habit. I looked out there and saw the guy on Billy's back... It was a scary thing. My instincts just took over. My rage took over. I was pretty furious. I wanted to get him off my teammate." After being arrested the attacker faced two counts of battery and one count of disorderly conduct. Spiers wound up with a welt under his left eye, a bloody nose and whiplash.

On May 21, 2007, Spiers was inducted into the South Carolina Athletics Hall of Fame. He was also inducted into Clemson's Hall of Fame that year. From 2016 to April 2024, Spiers served as a director of special teams for the football program at his alma mater at Clemson University. He retired after the April spring game in 2024.

== Personal life ==
His son, Will, was a punter for the Clemson Tigers football team and played more college football games (69) than any other player in NCAA history. His nephew, Carson, is a pitcher on the Cincinnati Reds.
