= Brian Kowitz =

American baseball player (born 1969)

- Outfielder
- Born: August 17, 1969 (age 56); Baltimore, Maryland, U.S.
- Batted: Left Threw: Left

MLB debut
- June 4, 1995, for the Atlanta Braves

Last MLB appearance
- June 16, 1995, for the Atlanta Braves

MLB statistics
- Batting average: .167
- Home runs: 0
- Runs batted in: 3
- Stats at Baseball Reference

Teams
- Atlanta Braves (1995)

Brian Mark Kowitz (born August 17, 1969) is an American former professional baseball player for the Atlanta Braves in 1995. He spent most of his career (1990 to 1996) in the minor leagues.

== Early and personal life ==
Kowitz grew up in Baltimore, Maryland, and is married with 3 children- a boy and two girls. He attended Jemicy in 1982 before graduating Boys' Latin School of Maryland in Baltimore, Maryland in 1987, where he competed in varsity football, basketball, and baseball. In 2012, Kowitz was inducted into the BL "Hall of Fame". He is Jewish.

== Baseball career ==
=== College ===
Kowitz was awarded a scholarship to play baseball for Clemson University where he won an ACC Championship, earned All ACC and Academic All American honors, and an ACC Player of the Year award as well as All American honors. He attended Clemson and as a freshman in 1988, Kowitz claimed one of the starting outfield spots for the Tigers and won a dramatic game against the Georgia Bulldogs at home with a blast over the center field wall in the bottom of the 10th inning to win the game. Kowitz was an ACC ALL Tournament Team selection as a freshman. As a sophomore in 1989, Kowitz was named to the ACC ALL Tournament Team and to the second Team All ACC Team. Clemson won the ACC Championship.

As a junior 1990 at Clemson, Kowitz was named ACC Player of the Year as he hit .403 and was among the leaders in NCAA Division I in runs (87, second, first in ACC) and tied for 7th in hits (102, first in ACC). He stole 34 bases (first in ACC) in 66 games and drove in 60 runners. In 1990 Kowitz also lead the ACC in doubles and triples. His 37-game hitting streak was the best in NCAA Division I in 1990. In addition, this amazing hitting streak was the second longest in Atlantic Coast Conference (ACC) history, as well as second in Clemson history to Hall of Fame (HOF) Rusty Adkins. He was second in the ACC in batting average and made the ACC All-Star team as an outfielder. In addition Kowitz was named to the All Regional Team in Austin TX in their quest to reach the College World Series. Kowitz was also an ACC ALL Tournament Team selection. Baseball America named him as a second-team All-American outfielder. Kowitz had a 37-game hitting streak which was the 2nd-longest in Clemson University's history. In 2019, he was inducted into the Clemson "Hall of Fame".

=== MiLB ===
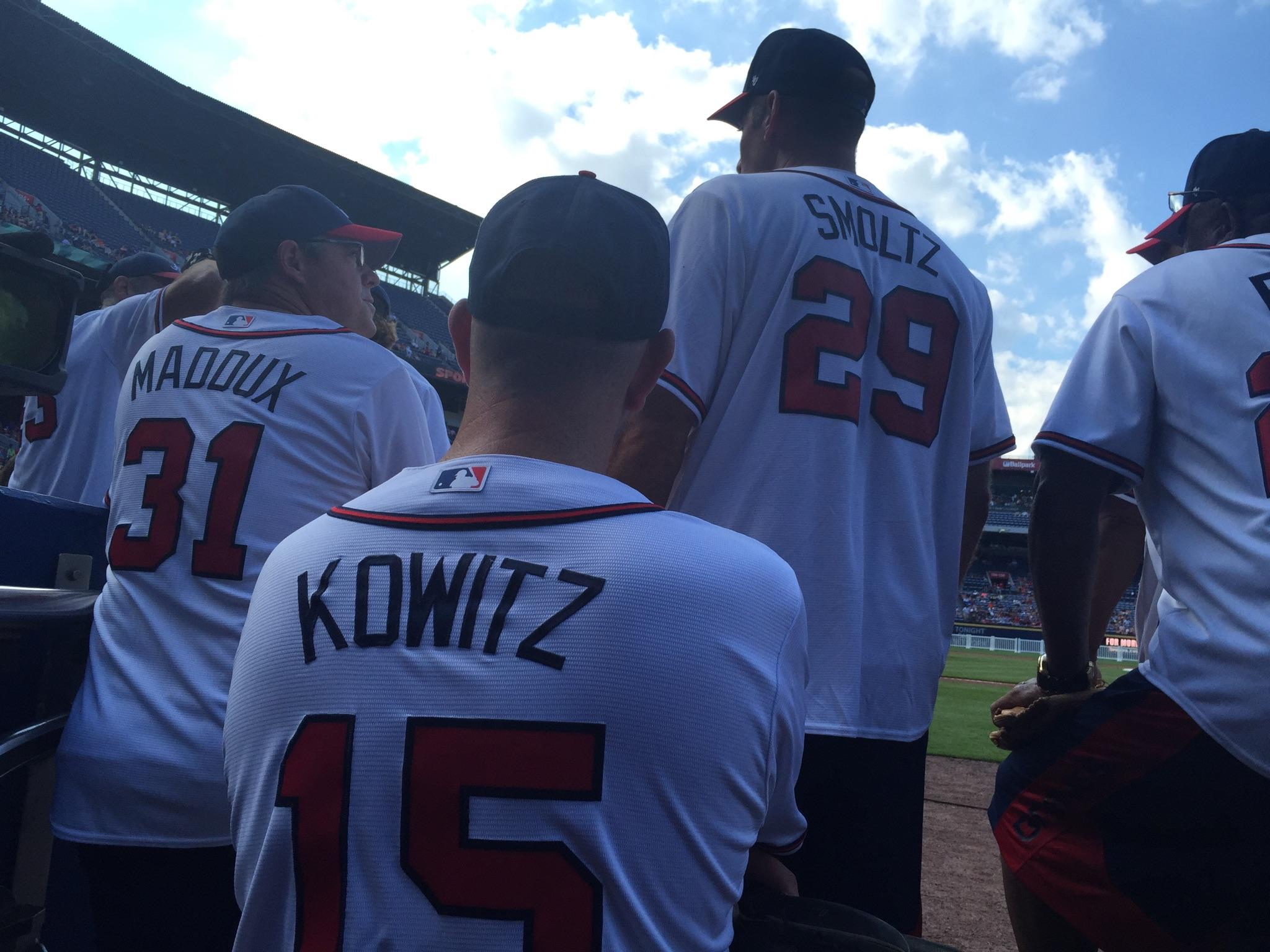
Kowitz as seen from the Atlanta Braves Dugout

Kowitz began his minor league career as a left-handed outfielder with the 1990 rookie-league Pulaski Braves. He batted .324/.382/.538 with 13 steals in 43 games. He was 8th in the Appalachian League in average and made the Appalachian All-Star team as an outfielder; he was selected as the 8th-best prospect in the league by the managers.

Before the end of the season, he was promoted to Class AA Greenville. Kowitz started the 1991 season with the Class A Durham Bulls where he hit .254/.303/.353 with 18 steals. He returned to Durham once more in 1992 and posted a .301/.373/.429 line with 22 steals. He was 6th in the Carolina League in average and made the league's All-Star team. He became a regular for the Greenville club in 1993 and batted .278/.363/.378 with 13 steals. He made it to AAA that year with the Richmond Braves and batted .267/.340/.422 for Richmond, scoring 10 runs in 12 games with them.

=== MLB ===
He was drafted by the Atlanta Braves in the 8th round of the 1990 amateur draft. Kowitz was promoted to the Atlanta Braves on June 3, 1995 when All-Star outfielder David Justice was put on the disabled list. Kowitz made his debut the very next day. He was used a pinch hitter in the 5th inning, in a game against the Houston Astros. He doubled down the left-field line for his first at bat, but the Braves lost 6-2. He appeared in only 9 more games, until David Justice returned, then Kowitz returned to Richmond. Kowitz received a ring with the 1995 Atlanta Braves.

On December 5, 1994 he was again drafted by the Minnesota Twins as part of the Rule 5 draft but was sent back to the Braves on April 25 of that year when he failed to stay on 25-man major league roster.

Kowitz signed with the Detroit Tigers in 1996. He played in spring training with the Tigers. He was sent to the Toledo Mud Hens. Kowitz was released in May, and was signed by the Toronto Blue Jays. He finished the year with the Syracuse Chiefs. Kowitz retired from baseball at the end of the 1996 season.
