= Khalil Greene =

American baseball player (born 1979)

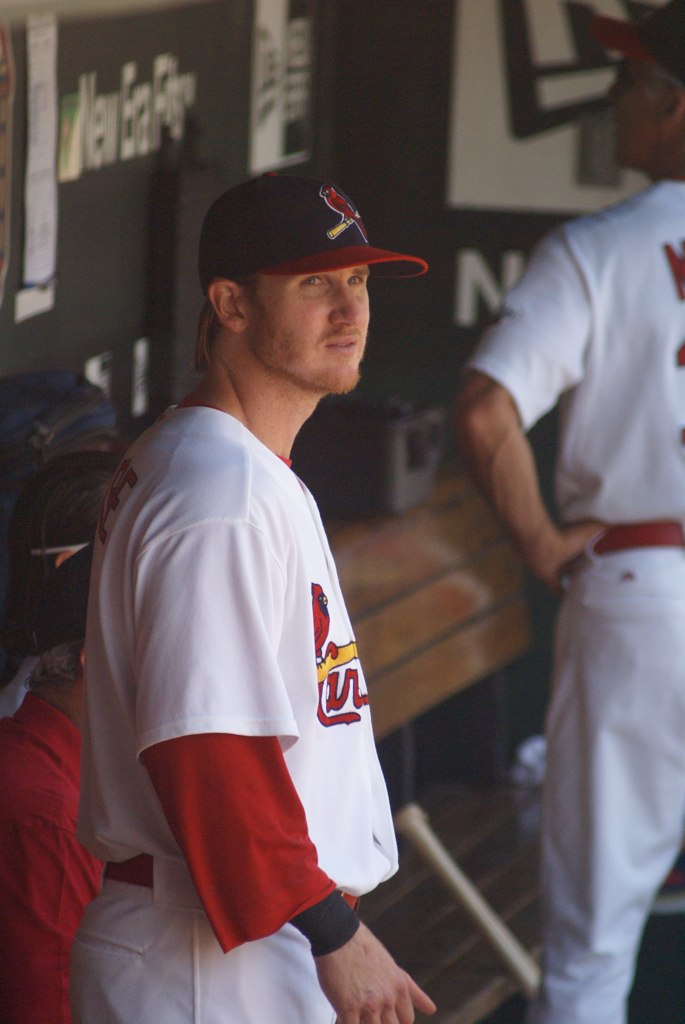
- Greene with the St. Louis Cardinals
- Shortstop
- Born: October 21, 1979 (age 46); Butler, Pennsylvania, U.S.
- Batted: Right Threw: Right

MLB debut
- September 3, 2003, for the San Diego Padres

Last MLB appearance
- October 4, 2009, for the St. Louis Cardinals

MLB statistics
- Batting average: .245
- Home runs: 90
- Runs batted in: 352
- Stats at Baseball Reference

Teams
- San Diego Padres (2003–2008); St. Louis Cardinals (2009)

Career highlights and awards
- Golden Spikes Award (2002); Dick Howser Trophy (2002)

Khalil Thabit Greene (born October 21, 1979) is an American former professional baseball shortstop. He played in Major League Baseball (MLB) for the San Diego Padres and St. Louis Cardinals. Despite playing in fewer than five full seasons for the team, Greene is the Padres' career leader in home runs at the shortstop position.

== Early life ==
Greene was raised by his father, James, a woodworker, and mother, Janet, a schoolteacher, in the Baháʼí Faith. He has said his faith helped his athletic performance mentally.

== Baseball career ==
=== High school and college ===
Greene played high school baseball at Key West High School. Greene played all 69 games at third base for the Clemson Tigers in his freshman season, all but one of them as a starter. His first collegiate home run was an inside-the-park home run which came at the UNLV/Coors Desert Classic on February 27. In his freshman year, Greene had 98 hits, setting the record for Clemson freshmen. He led the team in hits, multi-hit games (31), at-bats (274), and hit-by-pitches (11). His batting average for the season was .358. Greene was a unanimous selection to the All-Regional Team in the postseason.

In his sophomore season, Greene started every one of the team's 69 games at third base. He led the team in batting average with runners in scoring position at .444. He was an All-ACC second team selection. (The first team selection was Georgia Tech's Mark Teixeira.) He was selected to the All-ACC Tournament team. After the 1999 and 2000 seasons, he played collegiate summer baseball with the Falmouth Commodores of the Cape Cod Baseball League.

Greene again started every game for the Clemson Tigers in his junior season, but this time he and erstwhile shortstop Jeff Baker switched positions. He set the school record in season fielding percentage at that position (.965), while also setting every hit-by-pitch record for the school (in an inning, 2; in a game, 3; in a season, 21; in a career, 47). He also led the team in doubles with 18. He was named the ACC Player of the Week during the last week of the season. Peter Gammons made a prediction in his 2001 pre-draft column on ESPN.com: "You won't find Clemson shortstop/third baseman Khalil Greene or Wake Forest center fielder Cory Sullivan on any top-100 list, but check back in five years from now and see if they aren't remarkably like Jeff Cirillo and Steve Finley. Greene and Sullivan are players." Greene was drafted with the second pick of the fourteenth round (409th overall) by the Chicago Cubs, but did not sign.

Greene's senior season was his most impressive: Collegiate Baseball named him National Player of the Year. The publication, along with Baseball America, selected him as a member of their All-America first teams. Baseball America also chose Greene for their National Midseason Player of the Year. He was the ACC's Player of the Year and was named to the All-ACC first team. Greene was named winner of the Dick Howser Trophy, the Rotary Smith Award, and the Golden Spikes Award at the end of the season. He hit .480 with 26 home runs and 30 doubles with a .557 on-base percentage and .888 slugging percentage (for an OPS of 1.445). He broke his own fielding record with a .967 mark. In only one of the team's 67 games did he not reach base via walk or hit. His last at-bat in Clemson's Doug Kingsmore Stadium was, fittingly, a home run.

After Greene finished the 2002 season, having graduated with a bachelor's degree in sociology, he held school single-season records for total bases, extra-base hits, home runs, RBI, consecutive multi-hit games, and consecutive games with a home run. He still holds career school records in total bases and RBI. He holds the ACC single-season record for batting average and the ACC career records for doubles and hits. Greene also holds the NCAA record for doubles in a career. On June 22, 2002, Greene received a special resolution from the South Carolina General Assembly. He'd started 269 consecutive games. Greene was taken by the San Diego Padres with the thirteenth pick of the 2002 Major League Baseball draft.

=== San Diego Padres ===
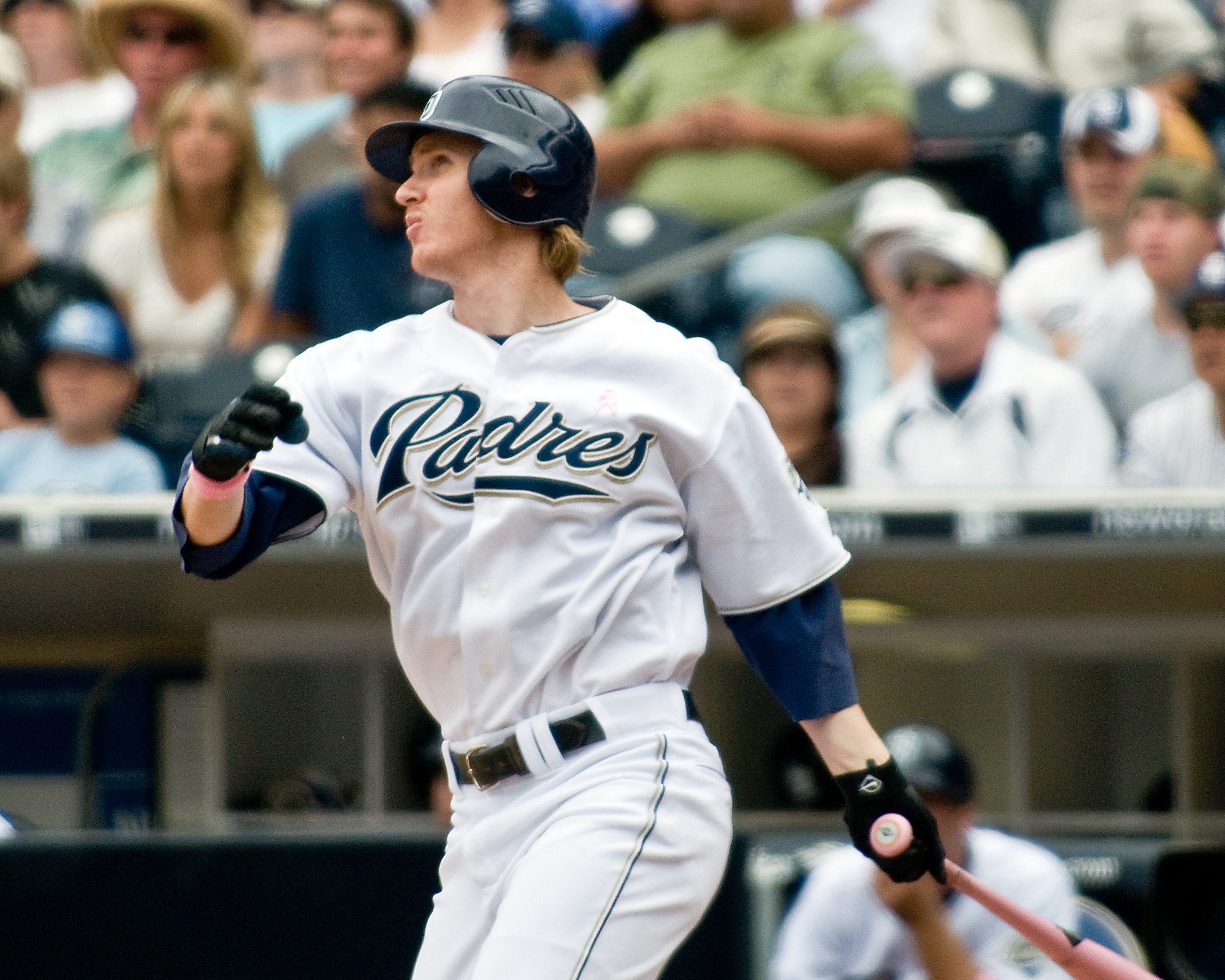
Greene at bat for the Padres in 2008.

After finishing his college career and being drafted by the Padres, Khalil Greene reported to the Single-A Eugene Emeralds where he played only ten games. He batted .270 with no home runs and six RBI. He was then called up to the Lake Elsinore Storm of the California League where he finished the season. In 46 games, he hit nine home runs with 32 RBI while batting .317.

In 2003, Greene started the season with the Double-A Mobile BayBears. In 59 games, he had a batting average of .275. He was then called up to the Triple-A Portland Beavers. In 76 games, Greene batted .288 with 10 home runs and 47 RBI.

Greene saw his first major league action on September 3, 2003, where he came into the game as a pinch-hitter for Brian Lawrence in the seventh inning and flew out against the Arizona Diamondbacks. He got his first start two days later against the Houston Astros, but went 0-for-4. His first hit came the next day; it was a single sharply hit up the middle against Ron Villone. His first home run led off the eighth inning of the September 16 game against Jerome Williams of the San Francisco Giants. He finished the year with an average of .215 with two home runs and six RBI in twenty games.

His first full season was in 2004. He played 139 games for the Padres, going 132-for-484 (.273) with 15 home runs and 65 RBI. He was seventh in the league in sacrifice flies with seven. His salary for the season was $300,500. Greene placed second in the MLB Rookie of the Year Award voting in the National League (to his former minor league roommate Jason Bay), despite having to play in fifteen of the last seventeen games of the season with a broken hand.

In 2005, Greene played in 121 games going 109 for 436 (.250) with 15 home runs and 70 RBI. He helped the Padres win their fourth division title, their first since 1998.

In 2006, Greene appeared in 121 games, and had 101 hits in 412 at-bats (.245) with 15 home runs and 55 RBI, helping the Padres win their second consecutive National League West title.

In 2007, Greene hit 155 for 611 for a (.254) average over 153 games. He also set a Padres record for home runs by a shortstop with 27, and accrued 97 RBI.

On February 4, 2008, the Padres signed Greene to a two-year, $11 million extension. Greene's 2008 season got off to a terrible start offensively, as he did not hit his first home run until May 2. By the end of July he was hitting only .213 with 10 home runs and 35 RBI (and 5 stolen bases). On July 30, 2008, Greene broke his hand due to punching a storage box after striking out for the 100th time that season (with his batting average dropping to .213). On July 31, 2008, it was announced Greene would miss the rest of the season.

=== St. Louis Cardinals ===
On December 4, 2008, Greene was traded to the St. Louis Cardinals for Mark Worrell and a player to be named later; he made $6.5 million in 2009. On March 23, 2009, it was announced that relief pitcher Luke Gregerson was the player to be named in the trade.

==== Mental health ====
Greene took several weeks off during May and June 2009, after it was revealed that he was cutting himself in mental anguish (revealed to be social anxiety disorder) due to a slow start for the Cardinals, hitting .197 with only three home runs at the time. He returned to the Cards lineup on June 19 at the Kansas City Royals. Playing third base for the first time since college, he went 2-for-2 with a double, a solo home run and a walk, eventually being substituted after fouling a ball off his foot. Following a 1-for-17 stretch over five games, Greene was placed back on the disabled list with social anxiety disorder on June 29.

=== Texas Rangers ===
Greene filed for free agency for the 2010 season, and signed with the Texas Rangers. On February 22, 2010, he announced that he had been suffering another episode of social anxiety disorder, and that he would not be reporting to Rangers spring training. On February 25, the Rangers voided Greene's contract.

== Other interests ==
Greene writes hip-hop lyrics in his spare time and adds them to music.

Awards and achievements
Preceded by Brandon Webb	Baseball America Rookie of the Year; 2004	Succeeded by Huston Street
