= 2016 New York Yankees season =

Season for the Major League Baseball team the New York Yankees

2016 New York Yankees
- League: American League
- Division: East
- Ballpark: Yankee Stadium
- City: New York, New York
- Record: 84–78 (.519)
- Divisional place: 4th
- Owners: Yankee Global Enterprises
- General managers: Brian Cashman
- Managers: Joe Girardi
- Television: YES Network; WPIX-TV (Michael Kay, Ken Singleton, several others as analysts)
- Radio: WFAN / WFAN-FM; New York Yankees Radio Network (John Sterling, Suzyn Waldman)

The 2016 New York Yankees season was the 114th season for the New York Yankees franchise.

Throughout the season, the Yankees wore a #8 patch on their left sleeve in memory of Hall of Famer Yogi Berra who died in September 2015. It was the final season for Alex Rodriguez and Mark Teixeira. For the third time in four years, the Yankees failed to make the playoffs, finishing in fourth place in the American League East with an 84–78 record, despite being outscored by their opponents over the course of the season, 702 runs to 680. The 2016 season was notable in that it marked the first time since 1989 that the Yankees were sellers at the trade deadline, dealing away valuable pieces to gain minor league prospects for the future. Rookie catcher Gary Sánchez made headlines by hitting 20 home runs in his first 53 games, representing the Yankees youth movement known as the "Baby Bombers". This was the last time the Yankees would miss the playoffs until 2023.

== Offseason ==
- On October 18, 2015, the Yankees fired their hitting coach, after just one season, Jeff Pentland.
- On November 2, it was announced that Alan Cockrell who was hired as the assistant the season before; will assume the role as hitting coach, with Marcus Thames as his assistant.
- On November 11, the Yankees traded John Ryan Murphy for Aaron Hicks.
- On December 9, the Yankees traded Adam Warren and Brendan Ryan to the Chicago Cubs in exchange for Starlin Castro.
- Also on December 9, the Yankees traded Justin Wilson to the Detroit Tigers for pitching prospects Luis Cessa and Chad Green. On December 28, the Yankees traded Eric Jagielo, Rookie Davis, Tony Renda, and Caleb Cotham for Aroldis Chapman from the Cincinnati Reds.
- On January 8, 2016, the Yankees purchased Kirby Yates from the Cleveland Indians. On January 17, the Yankees claimed Lane Adams off waivers, from the Kansas City Royals. On February 21, the Yankees signed free agent Chris Parmelee.
- On April 4, the Yankees traded Carlos Corporán to the Tampa Bay Rays for cash considerations.

== Season standings ==
=== American League East ===
AL East
Team	W	L	Pct.	GB	Home	Road
Boston Red Sox	93	69	.574	—	47‍–‍34	46‍–‍35
Toronto Blue Jays	89	73	.549	4	51‍–‍30	38‍–‍43
Baltimore Orioles	89	73	.549	4	50‍–‍31	39‍–‍42
New York Yankees	84	78	.519	9	48‍–‍33	36‍–‍45
Tampa Bay Rays	68	94	.420	25	36‍–‍45	32‍–‍49

=== American League Wild Card ===
Division leaders
Team	W	L	Pct.
Texas Rangers	95	67	.586
Cleveland Indians	94	67	.584
Boston Red Sox	93	69	.574

Wild Card teams (Top 2 teams qualify for postseason)
Team	W	L	Pct.	GB
Toronto Blue Jays	89	73	.549	—
Baltimore Orioles	89	73	.549	—
Detroit Tigers	86	75	.534	2½
Seattle Mariners	86	76	.531	3
New York Yankees	84	78	.519	5
Houston Astros	84	78	.519	5
Kansas City Royals	81	81	.500	8
Chicago White Sox	78	84	.481	11
Los Angeles Angels	74	88	.457	15
Oakland Athletics	69	93	.426	20
Tampa Bay Rays	68	94	.420	21
Minnesota Twins	59	103	.364	30

=== Record vs. opponents ===
2016 American League record Source: MLB Standings Grid – 2016
Team	BAL	BOS	CWS	CLE	DET	HOU	KC	LAA	MIN	NYY	OAK	SEA	TB	TEX	TOR	NL
Baltimore	—	8–11	4–3	5–1	5–2	1–6	4–2	4–2	5–1	10–9	3–4	1–6	13–6	3–4	9–10	14–6
Boston	11–8	—	3–4	4–2	2–5	5–2	2–4	4–3	4–3	11–8	5–1	4–3	12–7	3–3	9–10	14–6
Chicago	3–4	4–3	—	8–11	7–12	3–3	5–14	2–5	12–7	3–3	5–2	4–3	4–3	4–2	5–1	9–11
Cleveland	1–5	2–4	11–8	—	14–4	3–4	14–5	6–1	10–9	2–5	4–2	3–4	5–1	2–5	4–3	13–7
Detroit	2–5	5–2	12–7	4–14	—	4–2	7–12	2–4	15–4	3–3	4–3	4–3	6–1	2–4	3–4	13–7
Houston	6–1	2–5	3–3	4–3	2–4	—	3–4	13–6	5–2	2–4	13–6	11–8	3–3	4–15	2–5	11–9
Kansas City	2–4	4–2	14–5	5–14	12–7	4–3	—	1–5	15–4	2–5	1–6	3–4	5–2	1–6	2–4	10–10
Los Angeles	2–4	3–4	5–2	1–6	4–2	6–13	5–1	—	2–4	1–6	12–7	8–11	3–4	9–10	4–3	9–11
Minnesota	1–5	3–4	7–12	9–10	4–15	2–5	4–15	4–2	—	2–5	2–4	4–2	3–4	5–2	1–6	8–12
New York	9–10	8–11	3–3	5–2	3–3	4–2	5–2	6–1	5–2	—	4–3	3–3	11–8	3–4	7–12	8–12
Oakland	4–3	1–5	2–5	2–4	3–4	6–13	6–1	7–12	4–2	3–4	—	7–12	5–2	9–10	3–3	7–13
Seattle	6–1	3–4	3–4	4–3	3–4	8–11	4–3	11–8	2–4	3–3	12–7	—	4–2	7–12	3–3	13–7
Tampa Bay	6–13	7–12	3–4	1–5	1–6	3–3	2–5	4–3	4–3	8–11	2–5	2–4	—	4–2	11–8	10–10
Texas	4–3	3–3	2–4	5–2	4–2	15–4	6–1	10–9	2–5	4–3	10–9	12–7	2–4	—	3–4	13–7
Toronto	10–9	10–9	1–5	3–4	4–3	5–2	4–2	3–4	6–1	12–7	3–3	3–3	8–11	4–3	—	13–7

== Roster ==
2016 New York Yankees
Roster
Pitchers: 26 Johnny Barbato; 68 Dellin Betances; 50,54 Richard Bleier; 85 Luis Cessa; 54 Aroldis Chapman; 29 Tyler Clippard; 43 Phil Coke; 30 Nathan Eovaldi; 41,57,64 Nick Goody; 38,39,41,57 Chad Green; 61 Ben Heller; 65 Jonathan Holder; 39 Tommy Layne; 48 Andrew Miller; 55 Bryan Mitchell; 50,57 Conor Mullee; 47 Iván Nova; 50 Tyler Olson; 47 Blake Parker; 67 James Pazos; 57 Branden Pinder; 35 Michael Pineda; 52 CC Sabathia; 40 Luis Severino; 45 Chasen Shreve; 41,43 Anthony Swarzak; 19 Masahiro Tanaka; 43 Adam Warren; 39,50 Kirby Yates	Catchers: 34 Brian McCann; 27 Austin Romine; 24,57 Gary Sánchez; Infielders: 29 Dustin Ackley; 26 Tyler Austin; 36 Billy Butler; 14 Starlin Castro; 24 Ike Davis; 18 Didi Gregorius; 12 Chase Headley; 26 Chris Parmelee; 64 Rob Refsnyder; 13 Alex Rodriguez; 57 Donovan Solano; 25 Mark Teixeira; 17 Ronald Torreyes	Outfielders: 36 Carlos Beltrán; 22 Jacoby Ellsbury; 38,64 Ben Gamel; 11 Brett Gardner; 31 Aaron Hicks; 99 Aaron Judge; 66 Mason Williams; 48 Eric Young	Manager: 28 Joe Girardi; Coaches: 62 Alan Cockrell (hitting); 53 Joe Espada (third base); 60 Mike Harkey (bullpen); 56 Tony Peña (first base); 88 Román Rodríguez (bullpen catcher); 58 Larry Rothschild (pitching); 63 Marcus Thames (assistant hitting); 59 Rob Thomson (bench)

== Player stats ==
=== Batting ===
Note: G = Games played; AB = At bats; R = Runs; H = Hits; 2B = Doubles; 3B = Triples; HR = Home runs; RBI = Runs batted in; SB = Stolen bases; BB = Walks; AVG = Batting average; SLG = Slugging average

Player	G	AB	R	H	2B	3B	HR	RBI	SB	BB	AVG	SLG
Starlin Castro	151	577	63	156	29	1	21	70	4	24	.270	.433
Didi Gregorius	153	562	68	155	32	2	20	70	7	19	.276	.447
Jacoby Ellsbury	148	551	71	145	24	5	9	56	20	54	.263	.374
Brett Gardner	148	547	80	143	22	6	7	41	16	70	.261	.362
Chase Headley	140	467	58	118	18	1	14	51	8	51	.253	.385
Brian McCann	130	429	56	104	13	0	20	58	1	54	.242	.413
Mark Teixeira	116	387	43	79	16	0	15	44	2	47	.204	.362
Carlos Beltran	99	359	50	109	21	0	22	64	0	22	.304	.546
Aaron Hicks	123	327	32	71	13	1	8	31	3	30	.217	.336
Alex Rodriguez	65	225	19	45	7	0	9	31	3	14	.200	.351
Gary Sánchez	53	201	34	60	12	0	20	42	1	24	.299	.657
Austin Romine	62	165	17	40	11	0	4	26	1	7	.242	.382
Ronald Torreyes	72	155	20	40	7	4	1	12	2	10	.258	.374
Rob Refsnyder	58	152	25	38	9	0	0	12	2	18	.250	.309
Aaron Judge	27	84	10	15	2	0	4	10	0	9	.179	.345
Tyler Austin	31	83	7	20	3	0	5	12	1	7	.241	.458
Dustin Ackley	28	61	6	9	0	0	0	4	0	8	.148	.148
Billy Butler	12	29	3	10	2	0	1	4	0	2	.345	.517
Mason Williams	12	27	4	8	1	0	0	2	0	1	.296	.333
Donovan Solano	9	22	5	5	2	0	1	2	0	1	.227	.455
Ike Davis	8	14	2	3	0	0	0	1	0	1	.125	.125
Ben Gamel	6	8	1	1	0	0	0	0	0	1	.125	.125
Chris Parmelee	6	8	4	4	1	0	2	4	0	0	.500	1.375
Eric Young Jr.	6	1	2	0	0	0	0	0	1	0	.000	.000
Pitcher totals	162	17	0	0	0	0	0	0	0	1	.000	.000
Team totals	162	5458	680	1378	245	20	183	647	72	475	.252	.405

=== Pitching ===
Note: W = Wins; L = Losses; ERA = Earned run average; G = Games pitched; GS = Games started; SV = Saves; IP = Innings pitched; H = Hits allowed; R = Runs allowed; ER = Earned runs allowed; BB = Walks allowed; SO = Strikeouts

Player	W	L	ERA	G	GS	SV	IP	H	R	ER	BB	SO
Masahiro Tanaka	14	4	3.07	31	31	0	199.2	179	75	68	36	165
CC Sabathia	9	12	3.91	30	30	0	179.2	172	83	78	65	152
Michael Pineda	6	12	4.82	32	32	0	175.2	184	98	94	53	207
Nathan Eovaldi	9	8	4.76	24	21	0	124.2	123	66	66	40	97
Ivan Nova	7	6	4.90	21	15	1	97.1	107	54	53	25	75
Dellin Betances	3	6	3.08	73	0	12	73.0	54	31	25	28	126
Luis Severino	3	8	5.83	22	11	0	71.0	78	48	46	25	66
Luis Cessa	4	4	4.35	17	9	0	70.1	64	36	34	14	46
Chad Green	2	4	4.73	12	8	1	45.2	49	26	24	15	52
Andrew Miller	6	1	1.39	44	0	9	45.1	28	8	7	7	77
Kirby Yates	2	1	5.23	41	0	0	41.1	41	24	24	19	50
Chasen Shreve	2	1	5.18	37	0	1	33.0	29	19	19	13	33
Aroldis Chapman	3	0	2.01	31	0	20	31.1	20	8	7	8	44
Anthony Swarzak	1	2	5.52	26	0	0	31.0	28	19	19	7	31
Adam Warren	4	2	3.26	29	0	0	30.1	28	13	11	10	25
Nick Goody	0	0	4.66	27	0	0	29.0	30	15	15	12	34
Tyler Clippard	2	3	2.49	29	0	2	25.1	20	9	7	11	26
Bryan Mitchell	1	2	3.24	5	5	0	25.0	26	13	9	12	11
Richard Bleier	0	0	1.96	23	0	0	23.0	20	6	5	4	13
Blake Parker	1	0	4.96	16	0	1	16.1	16	9	9	8	15
Tommy Layne	2	0	3.38	29	0	1	16.0	10	6	6	7	13
Johnny Barbato	1	2	7.62	13	0	0	13.0	13	11	11	5	15
Jonathan Holder	0	0	5.40	8	0	0	8.1	8	5	5	4	5
Ben Heller	1	0	6.43	10	0	0	7.0	11	5	5	4	6
Phil Coke	0	0	6.00	3	0	0	6.0	7	5	4	4	1
James Pazos	1	0	13.50	7	0	0	3.1	7	5	5	1	3
Conor Mullee	0	0	3.00	3	0	0	3.0	0	1	1	4	4
Tyler Olson	0	0	6.75	1	0	0	2.2	3	2	2	2	0
Branden Pinder	0	0	18.00	1	0	0	1.0	3	2	2	1	1
Team totals	84	78	4.16	162	162	48	1428.1	1358	702	660	444	1393

== Season summary ==
=== April ===
Opening day lineup
Number	Name	Position
22	Jacoby Ellsbury	CF
31	Aaron Hicks	LF
13	Alex Rodriguez	DH
25	Mark Teixeira	1B
36	Carlos Beltrán	RF
34	Brian McCann	C
12	Chase Headley	3B
14	Starlin Castro	2B
18	Didi Gregorius	SS
19	Masahiro Tanaka	P

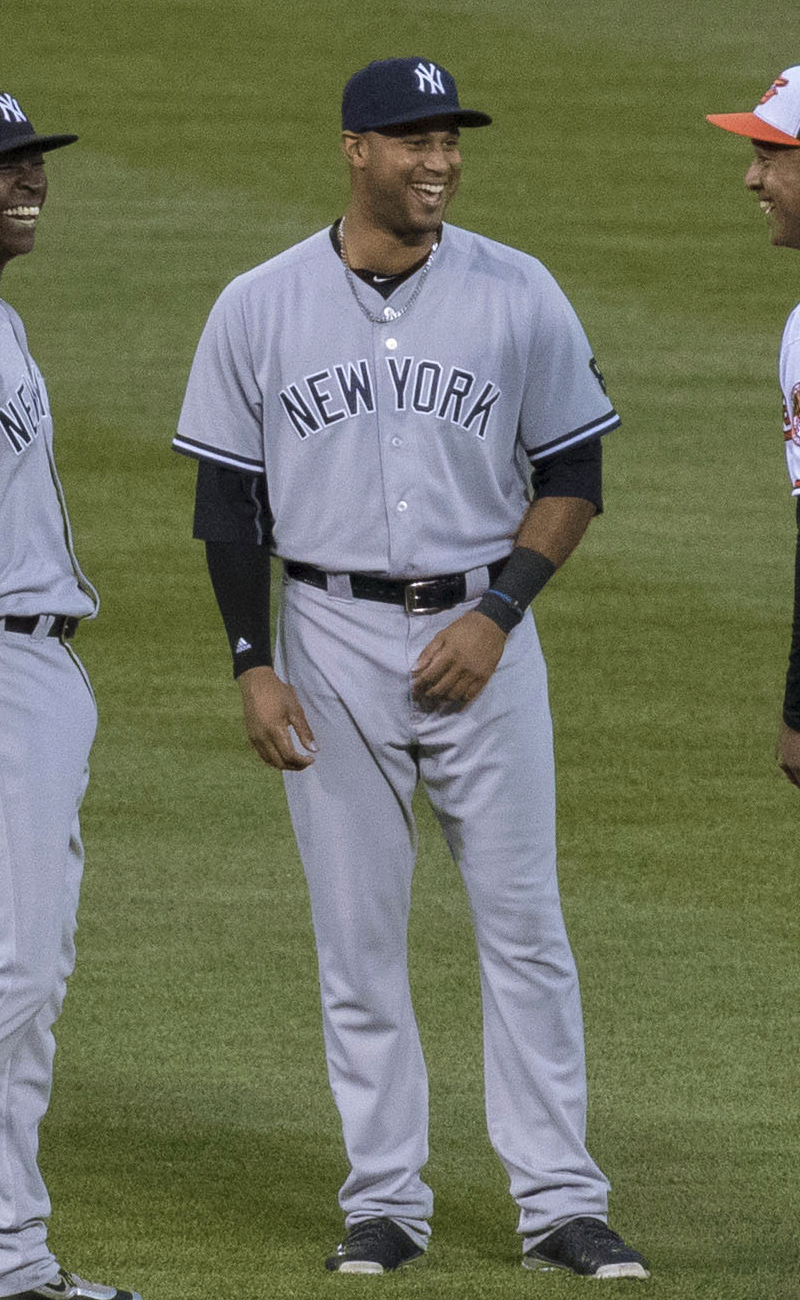
Aaron Hicks threw a record breaking throw from the outfield to the infield on April 20.

After the Yankees opening day was rained out, the Yankees played it a day later on April 5, losing 3–5 to the Houston Astros. The Yankees would go on to win their opening series two games to one against Houston. The next series, the Yankees went to Detroit to face the Detroit Tigers, taking one game and losing one game before having the final game postponed for an eventual make-up. The Yankees would go on to lose their next three series against the Blue Jays, Mariners, and the Oakland Athletics (a series in which they were swept). The Yankees would take two games in a three-game series against the Tampa Bay Rays at home. They finished April poorly with four game losing streak against the Texas Rangers and rival Red Sox. The Yankees finished April with a record of 8–14.

On April 12, Starlin Castro recorded his 1000th career hit. On April 20, Aaron Hicks recorded the fastest recorded throw tracked by Statcast in a 2–5 loss to Oakland, throwing out runner Danny Valencia at home plate. The throw was recorded at 105.5 miles per hour (169.8 km/h). On April 22, Jacoby Ellsbury recorded a straight steal of home, the first such occurrence for the Yankees since Derek Jeter did so against the Baltimore Orioles on May 5, 2001. The next day, Brett Gardner hit a walk-off home run against the Rays.

=== May ===
May saw a better overall month for the Yankees. The month opened with a loss to the Red Sox and a losing series against the Baltimore Orioles as the Yankees' reached the lowest point of their season at 9–17, eight games below .500. After that, the Yankees won three straight home series against Boston, the Kansas City Royals and the Chicago White Sox. Then, they travelled to the west coast for interleague play, dropping two of three to the Arizona Diamondbacks, including the first game in the series, which was the major league debut for starting pitcher Chad Green, then sweeping a four-game series against the Athletics to end the road trip at 21–22.

The Yankees crawled back to .500 (22-22) by winning the first game in the series against Toronto. However, they would lose five of the next seven games against the Blue Jays and the Rays to end the month of May at 24–27. The Yankees finished May with a record of 16–13.

On May 9, closer Aroldis Chapman made his Yankees debut, pitching one inning and allowing one earned run on two hits. The vaunted bullpen trio of Dellin Betances, Andrew Miller and Chapman became known in the media as "No-Runs DMC", a nod to the Queens hip-hop group Run–D.M.C. On May 16, Carlos Beltrán recorded his 400th career home run. On May 29, the Yankees beat the Rays 2–1 with only one hit, a Starlin Castro 2-run home run, the first time the Yankees won with only hit since 1914.

=== June ===
June saw similar results to May, as the Yankees finished with one less win for the month than they achieved in May. The Yankees swept the Angels in a four-game home series and took three of four from a road series with the Twins; however, struggles against the Colorado Rockies and Texas Rangers killed the Yankees' momentum. The Yankees finished June with an impressive home record of 10–6, which was neutralized by an ineffective 5–6 record on the road. The Yankees went 15–12 in the month of June.

On June 17, Alex Rodriguez achieved his 3100th hit. On June 22, Starlin Castro hit a walk-off homer against the Rockies.

=== July ===
The Yankees finished July with 13 wins and 13 losses. The Yankees sent three players to the 2016 Major League Baseball All-Star Game: Dellin Betances, Andrew Miller, and Carlos Beltran. Mark Teixeira recorded his 400th career home run away against the San Diego Padres on July 3, becoming just the fifth switch hitter to do so in Major League history. Carlos Beltrán recorded his 1500th career run batted in on July 16.

The Yankees became sellers towards the trade deadline, cutting a massive amount of salary shipping away various players. The Yankees dealt closer Aroldis Chapman to the Chicago Cubs in return for shortstop prospect Gleyber Torres, minor league outfielders Rashad Crawford and Billy McKinney, as well as right-handed pitcher Adam Warren who previously played for the Yankees the season before. The Yankees traded lefty pitcher Andrew Miller to the Cleveland Indians for minor league outfielder Clint Frazier, minor league left-handed pitcher Justus Sheffield, and minor league right-handed pitchers J. P. Feyereisen and Ben Heller. Pitcher Iván Nova was traded to the Pittsburgh Pirates for two players to be named later. The Yankees also traded veteran outfielder Carlos Beltrán to the Texas Rangers for pitchers Dillon Tate, Erik Swanson, and Nick Green.

=== August ===
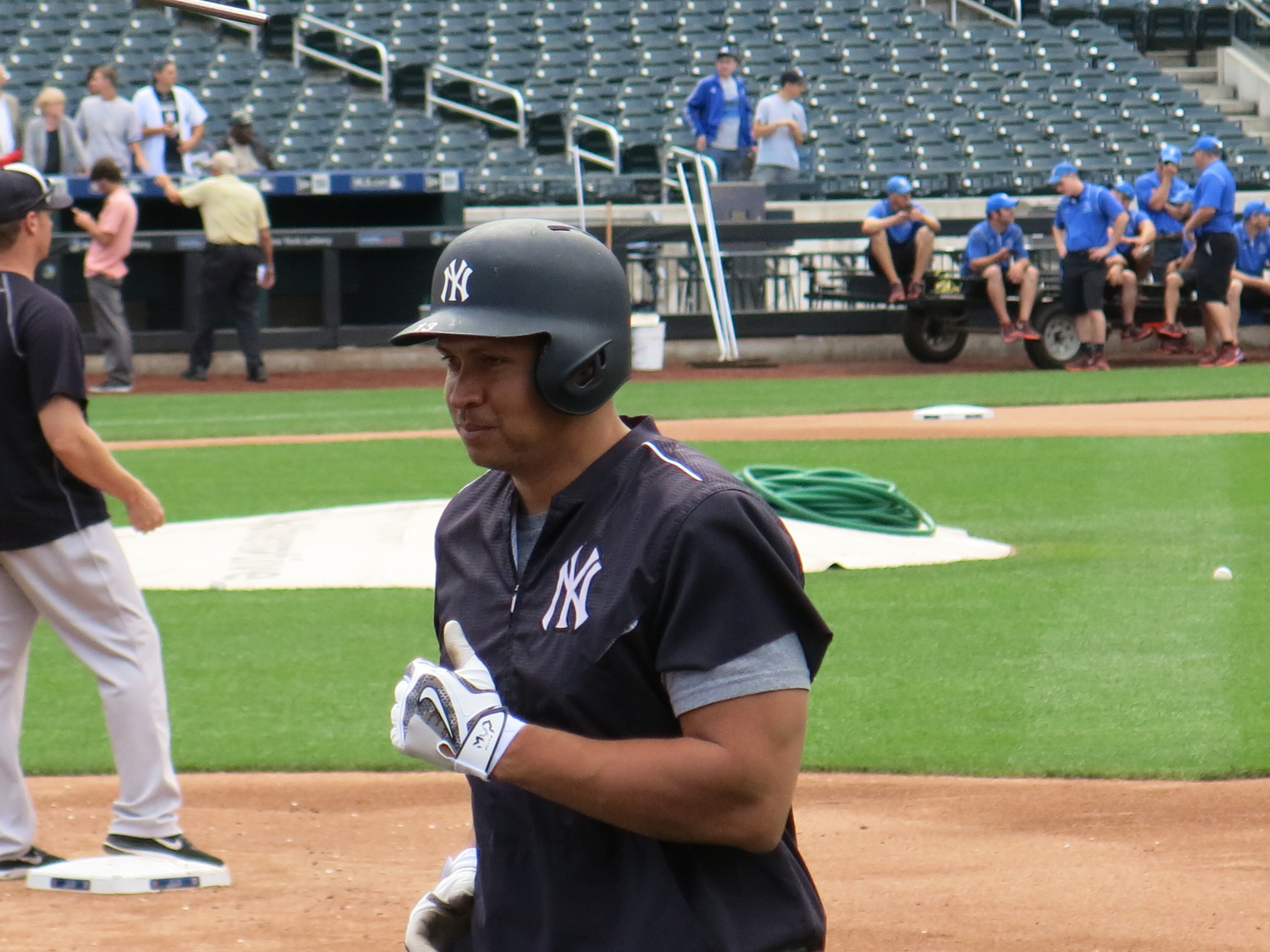
Alex Rodriguez during a game on August 2.

In early August, both Mark Teixeira and Alex Rodriguez announced their retirement from the team. Mark Teixeira announced on August 5 that he would retire following the conclusion of the season. Alex Rodriguez days later announced he would play his final game Friday, August 12, four homers short of 700. Rodriguez would become a titular assistant to the team following his final game. The Yankees acquired Blake Parker in early August as well. The day after Rodriguez's release by the organization, Tyler Austin and Aaron Judge were called up and made their major-league debuts, hitting back-to-back homers in their first big league at-bats. According to Elias Sports Bureau, Austin and Judge became the first teammates to go back-to-back in their first-ever at-bats in MLB history. Young Yankees catcher Gary Sánchez became the fastest player to record 11 home runs, accomplishing so in just twenty-three days. The Yankees finished the month of August with a 17–10 record.

=== September and October ===
The Yankees started September off on a hot start. After dropping the first two games of the month, they won seven straight games. Afterward, however, they lost 11 of their next 15, including a 3–8 road trip where they were swept in a four-game series versus the Boston Red Sox at Fenway Park for the first time since 1990 and losing three of four to the Blue Jays in Toronto. They closed the season with a six-game homestead where they swept the Red Sox (in the second game, Mark Teixeira hit a walk-off grand slam in the bottom of the ninth, his last home run of his career, to lift the Yankees to a 5–3 win) and losing two of three to the Orioles. On September 27, Gary Sánchez tied a major league record for the fastest player to reach 20 career home runs when he went deep in only his 51st career game. The Yankees would be eliminated from playoff contention on September 29, after the Orioles defeated the Blue Jays. This makes it the third time in 4 seasons the Yankees would miss the playoffs.

== Game log ==
Legend
	Yankees win
	Yankees loss
	Postponement
**Bold**	Yankees team member

Game Log (84–78) Home: 48–33 Away: 36–45
April (8–14) Home: 5–7 Away: 3–7

#	Date	Opponent	Score	Win	Loss	Save	Venue	Attendance	Record
0	Apr 4	Astros	Postponed (rain). Makeup date: April 5.						
1	Apr 5	Astros	3–5	Keuchel (1–0)	**Betances** (0–1)	Gregerson (1)	**Yankee Stadium**	47,820	0–1
2	Apr 6	Astros	16–6	**Pineda** (1–0)	McHugh (0–1)	**Nova** (1)	**Yankee Stadium**	37,493	1–1
3	Apr 7	Astros	8–5	**Shreve** (1–0)	Harris (0–1)	**Miller** (1)	**Yankee Stadium**	30,003	2–1
4	Apr 8	@ Tigers	0–4	Zimmermann (1–0)	**Severino** (0–1)	–	Comerica Park	45,049	2–2
5	Apr 9	@ Tigers	8–4	**Sabathia** (1–0)	Pelfrey (0–1)	–	Comerica Park	32,419	3–2
—	Apr 10	@ Tigers	Postponed (rain). Makeup date: June 2.						
6	Apr 12	@ Blue Jays	3–2	**Barbato** (1–0)	Cecil (0–1)	**Miller** (2)	Rogers Centre	28,819	4–2
7	Apr 13	@ Blue Jays	2–7	Happ (1–0)	**Pineda** (1–1)	–	Rogers Centre	27,938	4–3
8	Apr 14	@ Blue Jays	2–4	Stroman (2–0)	**Eovaldi** (0–1)	Osuna (4)	Rogers Centre	36,238	4–4
9	Apr 15	Mariners	1–7	Karns (1–1)	**Severino** (0–2)	–	**Yankee Stadium**	35,531	4–5
10	Apr 16	Mariners	2–3	Hernández (1–1)	**Sabathia** (1–1)	Cishek (1)	**Yankee Stadium**	38,574	4–6
11	Apr 17	Mariners	4–3	**Tanaka** (1–0)	Iwakuma (0–2)	**Miller** (3)	**Yankee Stadium**	43,856	5–6
12	Apr 19	Athletics	2–3 (11)	Rodriguez (1–0)	**Barbato** (1–1)	Madson (5)	**Yankee Stadium**	31,952	5–7
13	Apr 20	Athletics	2–5	Graveman (1–1)	**Eovaldi** (0–2)	Doolittle (2)	**Yankee Stadium**	37,396	5–8
14	Apr 21	Athletics	3–7	Hill (2–2)	**Shreve** (1–1)	Madson (6)	**Yankee Stadium**	33,818	5–9
15	Apr 22	Rays	6–3	**Nova** (1–0)	Moore (1–1)	**Miller** (4)	**Yankee Stadium**	31,843	6–9
16	Apr 23	Rays	3–2	**Miller** (1–0)	Ramírez (4–1)	–	**Yankee Stadium**	40,714	7–9
17	Apr 24	Rays	1–8	Smyly (1–2)	**Pineda** (1–2)	–	**Yankee Stadium**	40,981	7–10
18	Apr 25	@ Rangers	3–1	**Eovaldi** (1–2)	Ramos (0–1)	**Miller** (5)	Globe Life Park	31,453	8–10
19	Apr 26	@ Rangers	1–10	Griffin (3–0)	**Severino** (0–3)	–	Globe Life Park	26,163	8–11
20	Apr 27	@ Rangers	2–3	Pérez (1–2)	**Sabathia** (1–2)	Tolleson (7)	Globe Life Park	35,477	8–12
21	Apr 29	@ Red Sox	2–4	Uehara (1–1)	**Betances** (0–2)	Kimbrel (7)	Fenway Park	37,115	8–13
22	Apr 30	@ Red Sox	0–8	Porcello (5–0)	**Pineda** (1–3)	–	Fenway Park	37,901	8–14

May (16–13) Home: 8–5 Away: 8–8

#	Date	Opponent	Score	Win	Loss	Save	Venue	Attendance	Record
23	May 1	@ Red Sox	7–8	Price (4–0)	**Nova** (1–1)	Kimbrel (8)	Fenway Park	34,279	8–15
24	May 3	@ Orioles	1–4	Tillman (3–1)	**Severino** (0–4)	O'Day (2)	Oriole Park	16,083	8–16
25	May 4	@ Orioles	7–0	**Sabathia** (2–2)	Wilson (1–1)	–	Oriole Park	15,998	9–16
26	May 5	@ Orioles	0–1 (10)	Britton (2–1)	**Barbato** (1–2)	–	Oriole Park	19,598	9–17
27	May 6	Red Sox	3–2	**Yates** (1–0)	Porcello (5–1)	**Miller** (6)	**Yankee Stadium**	45,756	10–17
28	May 7	Red Sox	8–2	**Eovaldi** (2–2)	Price (4–1)	–	**Yankee Stadium**	47,822	11–17
29	May 8	Red Sox	1–5	Wright (3–3)	**Severino** (0–5)	–	**Yankee Stadium**	41,869	11–18
30	May 9	Royals	6–3	**Yates** (2–0)	Young (1–5)	–	**Yankee Stadium**	41,243	12–18
31	May 10	Royals	10–7	**Miller** (2–0)	Herrera (0–1)	**Chapman** (1)	**Yankee Stadium**	39,128	13–18
32	May 11	Royals	3–7	Ventura (3–2)	**Pineda** (1–4)	–	**Yankee Stadium**	31,226	13–19
33	May 12	Royals	7–3	**Eovaldi** (3–2)	Kennedy (4–3)	–	**Yankee Stadium**	35,944	14–19
34	May 13	White Sox	1–7	Sale (8–0)	**Severino** (0–6)	–	**Yankee Stadium**	34,264	14–20
35	May 14	White Sox	2–1	**Nova** (2–1)	Quintana (5–2)	**Chapman** (2)	**Yankee Stadium**	39,691	15–20
36	May 15	White Sox	7–5	**Betances** (1–2)	Albers (1–2)	**Chapman** (3)	**Yankee Stadium**	41,979	16–20
37	May 16	@ D'backs	2–12	Ray (2–2)	**Green** (0–1)	–	Chase Field	32,718	16–21
38	May 17	@ D'backs	3–5	Greinke (4–3)	**Pineda** (1–5)	Ziegler (8)	Chase Field	30,913	16–22
39	May 18	@ D'backs	4–2	**Eovaldi** (4–2)	Miller (1–5)	**Chapman** (4)	Chase Field	32,191	17–22
40	May 19	@ Athletics	4–1	**Nova** (3–1)	Graveman (1–6)	**Chapman** (5)	Oakland Alameda Coliseum	17,456	18–22
41	May 20	@ Athletics	8–3	**Sabathia** (3–2)	Gray (3–5)	–	Oakland Alameda Coliseum	28,235	19–22
42	May 21	@ Athletics	5–1	**Tanaka** (2–0)	**Manaea** (1–2)	–	Oakland Alameda Coliseum	26,356	20–22
43	May 22	@ Athletics	5–4	**Pineda** (2–5)	Hahn (1–2)	**Chapman** (6)	Oakland Alameda Coliseum	25,237	21–22
44	May 24	Blue Jays	6–0	**Eovaldi** (5–2)	Dickey (2–6)	–	**Yankee Stadium**	35,174	22–22
45	May 25	Blue Jays	4–8	Estrada (2–2)	**Nova** (3–2)	–	**Yankee Stadium**	38,959	22–23
46	May 26	Blue Jays	1–3	Happ (6–2)	**Sabathia** (3–3)	Osuna (10)	**Yankee Stadium**	38,391	22–24
47	May 27	@ Rays	4–1	**Tanaka** (3–0)	Archer (3–6)	–	Tropicana Field	14,697	23–24
48	May 28	@ Rays	5–9	Moore (2–3)	**Pineda** (2–6)	–	Tropicana Field	20,188	23–25
49	May 29	@ Rays	2–1	**Eovaldi** (6–2)	Odorizzi (2–3)	**Chapman** (7)	Tropicana Field	19,748	24–25
50	May 30	@ Blue Jays	2–4	Estrada (3–2)	**Nova** (3–3)	Storen (3)	Rogers Centre	32,921	24–26
51	May 31	@ Blue Jays	1–4	Biagini (3–1)	**Sabathia** (3–4)	Osuna (12)	Rogers Centre	33,419	24–27

June (15–12) Home: 10–6 Away: 5–6

#	Date	Opponent	Score	Win	Loss	Save	Venue	Attendance	Record
52	Jun 1	@ Blue Jays	0–7	Sanchez (5–1)	**Tanaka** (3–1)	–	Rogers Centre	39,512	24–28
53	Jun 2	@ Tigers	5–4	**Betances** (2–2)	Boyd (0–1)	**Chapman** (8)	Comerica Park	28,213	25–28
54	Jun 3	@ Orioles	5–6	Givens (5–0)	**Betances** (2–3)	Britton (16)	Oriole Park	25,220	25–29
55	Jun 4	@ Orioles	8–6	**Nova** (4–3)	Wilson (2–5)	**Chapman** (9)	Oriole Park	33,170	26–29
56	Jun 5	@ Orioles	1–3	McFarland (1–1)	**Betances** (2–4)	Britton (17)	Oriole Park	28,807	26–30
57	Jun 6	Angels	5–2	**Miller** (3–0)	Shoemaker (3–7)	**Chapman** (10)	**Yankee Stadium**	34,648	27–30
58	Jun 7	Angels	6–3	**Pineda** (3–6)	Huff (0–1)	**Miller** (7)	**Yankee Stadium**	31,034	28–30
59	Jun 8	Angels	12–6	**Swarzak** (1–0)	Weaver (5–5)	–	**Yankee Stadium**	31,557	29–30
60	Jun 9	Angels	6–3	**Nova** (5–3)	Chacín (2–4)	**Chapman** (11)	**Yankee Stadium**	31,560	30–30
61	Jun 10	Tigers	4–0	**Sabathia** (4–4)	Pelfrey (1–6)	–	**Yankee Stadium**	40,011	31–30
62	Jun 11	Tigers	1–4	Verlander (5–4)	**Tanaka** (3–2)	Rodríguez (18)	**Yankee Stadium**	38,050	31–31
63	Jun 12	Tigers	1–4	Fulmer (7–1)	**Pineda** (3–7)	Rodríguez (19)	**Yankee Stadium**	47,474	31–32
64	Jun 14	@ Rockies	10–13	de la Rosa (3–4)	**Eovaldi** (6–3)	Estévez (2)	Coors Field	46,335	31–33
65	Jun 15	@ Rockies	3–6	Bettis (5–5)	**Nova** (5–4)	Estévez (3)	Coors Field	40,093	31–34
66	Jun 16	@ Twins	4–1	**Sabathia** (5–4)	Gibson (0–5)	**Chapman** (12)	Target Field	23,751	32–34
67	Jun 17	@ Twins	8–2	**Tanaka** (3–2)	Dean (1–3)	–	Target Field	23,888	33–34
68	Jun 18	@ Twins	7–6	**Miller** (4–0)	Abad (1–1)	**Chapman** (13)	Target Field	34,368	34–34
69	Jun 19	@ Twins	4–7	Santana (2–7)	**Eovaldi** (6–4)	Kintzler (2)	Target Field	29,553	34–35
70	Jun 21	Rockies	4–8	Bettis (6–5)	**Nova** (5–5)	–	**Yankee Stadium**	34,760	34–36
71	Jun 22	Rockies	9–8	**Chapman** (1–0)	Motte (0–1)	–	**Yankee Stadium**	40,104	35–36
72	Jun 24	Twins	5–3	**Tanaka** (5–2)	Milone (0–2)	**Chapman** (14)	**Yankee Stadium**	36,090	36–36
73	Jun 25	Twins	2–1	**Miller** (5–0)	Pressly (2–4)	**Chapman** (15)	**Yankee Stadium**	40,075	37–36
74	Jun 26	Twins	1–7	Duffey (3–6)	**Eovaldi** (6–5)	－	**Yankee Stadium**	38,673	37–37
75	Jun 27	Rangers	6–9	Barnette (5–2)	**Yates** (2–1)	Dyson (16)	**Yankee Stadium**	32,914	37–38
76	Jun 28	Rangers	1–7	Hamels (9–1)	**Sabathia** (5–5)	–	**Yankee Stadium**	32,373	37–39
77	Jun 29	Rangers	9–7	**Cessa** (1–0)	Dyson (1–2)	–	**Yankee Stadium**	39,875	38–39
78	Jun 30	Rangers	2–1	**Chapman** (2–0)	Barnette (5–3)	–	**Yankee Stadium**	39,934	39–39

July (13–13) Home: 6–4 Away: 7–9

#	Date	Opponent	Score	Win	Loss	Save	Venue	Attendance	Record
79	Jul 1	@ Padres	6–7	Rea (5–3)	**Eovaldi** (6–6)	Maurer (1)	Petco Park	41,321	39–40
80	Jul 2	@ Padres	1–2	Hand (2–2)	**Miller** (5–1)	–	Petco Park	42,315	39–41
81	Jul 3	@ Padres	6–3	**Green** (1–1)	Cashner (3–6)	**Chapman** (16)	Petco Park	42,131	40–41
82	Jul 4	@ White Sox	2–8	Shields (4–9)	**Sabathia** (5–6)	–	U.S. Cellular Field	30,905	40–42
83	Jul 5	@ White Sox	9–0	**Tanaka** (6–2)	Rodon (2–8)	–	U.S. Cellular Field	20,773	41–42
84	Jul 6	@ White Sox	0–5	González (2–4)	**Pineda** (3–8)	–	U.S. Cellular Field	21,144	41–43
85	Jul 7	@ Indians	5–4	**Nova** (6–5)	Bauer (7–3)	Chapman (17)	Progressive Field	23,848	42–43
86	Jul 8	@ Indians	2–10	**Green** (1–2)	Kluber (9–8)	–	Progressive Field	34,045	42–44
87	Jul 9	@ Indians	7–6 (11)	**Chapman** (3–0)	Hunter (2–2)	–	Progressive Field	32,951	43–44
88	Jul 10	@ Indians	11–7	**Eovaldi** (7–6)	Carrasco (5–3)	–	Progressive Field	29,089	44–44
**87th All-Star Game in San Diego, California**
89	Jul 15	Red Sox	3–5	Wright (11–5)	**Pineda** (3–9)	Uehara (5)	**Yankee Stadium**	47,439	44–45
90	Jul 16	Red Sox	2–5	Rodríguez (2–3)	**Sabathia** (5–7)	Uehara (6)	**Yankee Stadium**	48,329	44–46
91	Jul 17	Red Sox	3–1	**Tanaka** (7–2)	Price (9–7)	**Chapman** (18)	**Yankee Stadium**	42,884	45–46
92	Jul 18	Orioles	2–1	**Nova** (7–5)	Gausman (1–7)	**Chapman** (19)	**Yankee Stadium**	31,102	46–46
93	Jul 19	Orioles	7–1	**Eovaldi** (8–6)	Worley (2–1)	–	**Yankee Stadium**	31,192	47–46
94	Jul 20	Orioles	5–0	**Pineda** (4–9)	Gallardo (3–2)	–	**Yankee Stadium**	35,681	48–46
95	Jul 21	Orioles	1–4	Tillman (14–2)	**Sabathia** (5–8)	Britton (30)	**Yankee Stadium**	42,476	48–47
96	Jul 22	Giants	3–2	**Miller** (6–1)	Osich (1–2)	**Chapman** (20)	**Yankee Stadium**	45,304	49–47
97	Jul 23	Giants	1–2 (12)	Casilla (2–3)	**Swarzak** (1–1)	Strickland (2)	**Yankee Stadium**	46,727	49–48
98	Jul 24	Giants	5–2	**Eovaldi** (9–6)	Samardzija (9–6)	**Green** (1)	**Yankee Stadium**	34,143	50–48
99	Jul 25	@ Astros	2–1	**Pineda** (5–9)	Keuchel (6–10)	**Miller** (8)	Minute Maid Park	30,628	51–48
100	Jul 26	@ Astros	6–3	**Sabathia** (6–8)	Fister (10–7)	**Miller** (9)	Minute Maid Park	28,134	52–48
101	Jul 27	@ Astros	1–4	McCullers (6–4)	**Tanaka** (7–3)	Harris (11)	Minute Maid Park	35,186	52–49
102	Jul 29	@ Rays	1–5	Odorizzi (5–5)	**Nova** (7–6)	Colomé (23)	Tropicana Field	17,856	52–50
103	Jul 30	@ Rays	3–6	Smyly (3–11)	**Eovaldi** (9–7)	Colomé (24)	Tropicana Field	45,883	52–51
104	Jul 31	@ Rays	3–5	Snell (3–5)	**Pineda** (5–10)	Colomé (25)	Tropicana Field	18,109	52–52

August (17–10) Home: 8–6 Away: 9–5

#	Date	Opponent	Score	Win	Loss	Save	Venue	Attendance	Record
105	Aug 1	@ Mets	6–5 (10)	**Warren** (4–2)	Lugo (0–1)	**Betances** (1)	Citi Field	42,125	53–52
106	Aug 2	@ Mets	1–7	deGrom (7–5)	**Tanaka** (7–4)	–	Citi Field	42,819	53–53
107	Aug 3	Mets	9–5	**Severino** (1–6)	Matz (8–8)	–	**Yankee Stadium**	48,339	54–53
108	Aug 4	Mets	1–4	Colón (10–6)	**Eovaldi** (9–8)	Familia (38)	**Yankee Stadium**	48,153	54–54
109	Aug 5	Indians	13–7	**Pineda** (6–10)	Tomlin (11–4)	－	**Yankee Stadium**	39,252	55–54
110	Aug 6	Indians	2–5	Kluber (11–8)	**Sabathia** (6–9)	Miller (10)	**Yankee Stadium**	37,264	55–55
111	Aug 7	Indians	3–2	**Tanaka** (8–4)	Carrasco (7–6)	**Betances** (2)	**Yankee Stadium**	39,720	56–55
112	Aug 9	@ Red Sox	3–5	Porcello (15–3)	**Severino** (1–7)	Barnes (1)	Fenway Park	38,089	56–56
113	Aug 10	@ Red Sox	9–4	**Clippard** (3–3)	Abad (1–6)	–	Fenway Park	37,779	57–56
114	Aug 11	@ Red Sox	4–2	**Cessa** (2–0)	Ziegler (2–6)	**Betances** (3)	Fenway Park	38,161	58–56
115	Aug 12	Rays	6–3	**Sabathia** (7–9)	Archer (6–16)	**Betances** (4)	**Yankee Stadium**	46,459	59–56
116	Aug 13	Rays	8–4	**Tanaka** (9–4)	Andries (6–4)	–	**Yankee Stadium**	41,682	60–56
117	Aug 14	Rays	3–12	Odorizzi (7–5)	**Severino** (1–8)	–	**Yankee Stadium**	41,473	60–57
118	Aug 15	Blue Jays	1–0	**Green** (2-2)	Dickey (8–13)	**Betances** (5)	**Yankee Stadium**	36,015	61–57
119	Aug 16	Blue Jays	6–12	Feldman (6–4)	**Warren** (4–3)	–	**Yankee Stadium**	31,874	61–58
120	Aug 17	Blue Jays	4–7	Happ (17–3)	**Sabathia** (7–10)	Osuna (27)	**Yankee Stadium**	37,736	61–59
121	Aug 19	@ Angels	7–0	**Tanaka** (10–4)	Weaver (8–11)	–	Angel Stadium of Anaheim	40,256	62–59
122	Aug 20	@ Angels	5–1	**Cessa** (3–0)	Nolasco (4–11)	–	Angel Stadium of Anaheim	44,129	63–59
123	Aug 21	@ Angels	0–2	Chacin (4–8)	**Green** (2–3)	Salas (4)	Angel Stadium of Anaheim	40,309	63–60
124	Aug 22	@ Mariners	5–7	Vincent (3–3)	**Swarzak** (1–2)	Díaz (10)	Safeco Field	24,384	63–61
125	Aug 23	@ Mariners	5–1	**Sabathia** (8–10)	Walker (4–8)	—	Safeco Field	24,628	64–61
126	Aug 24	@ Mariners	5–0	**Tanaka** (11–4)	Iwakuma (14–9)	—	Safeco Field	41,536	65–61
127	Aug 26	Orioles	14–4	**Cessa** (4–0)	Gallardo (4–6)	—	**Yankee Stadium**	38,423	66–61
128	Aug 27	Orioles	13–5	**Layne** (1–1)	Bundy (7–5)	—	**Yankee Stadium**	38,843	67–61
129	Aug 28	Orioles	0–5	Gausman (6–10)	**Sabathia** (8–11)		**Yankee Stadium**	38,002	67–62
130	Aug 29	@ Royals	5–8	Gee (6–7)	**Pineda** (6–11)	Herrera (11)	Kauffman Stadium	22,859	67–63
131	Aug 30	@ Royals	5–4 (10)	**Betances** (3–4)	Soria (4–6)	**Shreve** (1)	Kauffman Stadium	22,895	68–63
132	Aug 31	@ Royals	5–4 (13)	**Heller** (1–0)	Young (3–9)	**Betances** (7)	Kauffman Stadium	22,615	69–63

September (14–14) Home: 10–4 Away: 4–10

#	Date	Opponent	Score	Win	Loss	Save	Venue	Attendance	Record
133	Sep 2	@ Orioles	0–8	Bundy (8–5)	**Green** (2–4)	—	Oriole Park	24,226	69–64
134	Sep 3	@ Orioles	0–2	Gausman (7–10)	**Sabathia** (8–12)	Britton (40)	Oriole Park	30,855	69–65
135	Sep 4	@ Orioles	5–2	**Severino** (2–8)	Miley (8–12)	**Betances** (8)	Oriole Park	31,161	70–65
136	Sep 5	Blue Jays	5–3	**Tanaka** (12–4)	Dickey (9–14)	**Betances** (9)	**Yankee Stadium**	42,141	71–65
137	Sep 6	Blue Jays	7–6	**Shreve** (2–1)	Grilli (5–5)	**Parker** (1)	**Yankee Stadium**	27,532	72–65
138	Sep 7	Blue Jays	2–0	**Mitchell** (1–0)	Stroman (9–7)	**Clippard** (2)	**Yankee Stadium**	30,501	73–65
139	Sep 8	Rays	5–4	**Layne** (2–1)	Ramírez (7–11)	–	**Yankee Stadium**	27,631	74–65
140	Sep 9	Rays	7–5	**Warren** (5–3)	Snell (5–8)	**Betances** (10)	**Yankee Stadium**	30,194	75–65
141	Sep 10	Rays	5–1	**Tanaka** (13–4)	Archer (8–18)	—	**Yankee Stadium**	35,810	76–65
142	Sep 11	Rays	2–4	Andriese (7–7)	**Cessa** (4–1)	Colomé (32)	**Yankee Stadium**	33,087	76–66
143	Sep 12	Dodgers	2–8	De León (2–0)	**Mitchell** (1–1)	—	**Yankee Stadium**	32,058	76–67
144	Sep 13	Dodgers	3–0	**Warren** (3–1)	Stripling (4–7)	**Betances** (11)	**Yankee Stadium**	32,615	77–67
145	Sep 14	Dodgers	0–2	Avilán (2–0)	**Betances** (3–5)	Jansen (44)	**Yankee Stadium**	30,254	77–68
146	Sep 15	@ Red Sox	5–7	Kelly (3–0)	**Betances** (3–6)	—	Fenway Park	37,768	77–69
147	Sep 16	@ Red Sox	4–7	Buchholz (7–10)	**Cessa** (4–2)	Kimbrel (26)	Fenway Park	37,927	77–70
148	Sep 17	@ Red Sox	5–6	Barnes (4–3)	**Warren** (6–4)	Kimbrel (27)	Fenway Park	37,267	77–71
149	Sep 18	@ Red Sox	4–5	Scott (1–0)	**Clippard** (3–4)	Uehara (7)	Fenway Park	37,306	77–72
150	Sep 20	@ Rays	5–3	**Severino** (3–8)	Boxberger (4–3)	**Betances** (12)	Tropicana Field	12,732	78–72
151	Sep 21	@ Rays	11–5	**Tanaka** (14–4)	Cobb (1–1)	–	Tropicana Field	12,192	79–72
152	Sep 22	@ Rays	0–2	Snell (6–8)	**Cessa** (4–3)	Colomé (35)	Tropicana Field	13,355	79–73
153	Sep 23	@ Blue Jays	0–9	Liriano (8–13)	**Mitchell** (1–2)	–	Rogers Centre	47,016	79–74
154	Sep 24	@ Blue Jays	0–3	Grilli (7–5)	**Clippard** (3–5)	Osuna (35)	Rogers Centre	47,828	79–75
155	Sep 25	@ Blue Jays	3–4	Osuna (3–2)	**Clippard** (3–6)	–	Rogers Centre	47,896	79–76
156	Sep 26	@ Blue Jays	7–5	**Warren** (7–4)	Grilli (7–6)	**Layne** (1)	Rogers Centre	44,532	80–76
157	Sep 27	Red Sox	6–4	**Parker** (1–0)	Price (17–9)	**Clippard** (3)	**Yankee Stadium**	35,161	81–76
158	Sep 28	Red Sox	5–3	**Pazos** (1–0)	Kimbrel (2–5)	–	**Yankee Stadium**	35,520	82–76
159	Sep 29	Red Sox	5–1	**Sabathia** (9–12)	Owens (0–2)	–	**Yankee Stadium**	41,597	83–76
160	Sep 30	Orioles	1–8	Gallardo (6–8)	**Pineda** (6–12)	–	**Yankee Stadium**	33,955	83–77

October (1–1) Home: 1–1 Away: 0–0

#	Date	Opponent	Score	Win	Loss	Save	Venue	Attendance	Record
161	Oct 1	Orioles	7–3	**Clippard** (4–6)	Brach (10–4)	—	**Yankee Stadium**	33,222	84–77
162	Oct 2	Orioles	2–5	Gausman (9–12)	**Cessa** (4–4)	—	**Yankee Stadium**	33,277	84–78

== Farm system ==
Level	Team	League	Manager
AAA	Scranton/Wilkes-Barre RailRiders	International League	Al Pedrique
AA	Trenton Thunder	Eastern League	Bobby Mitchell
A	Tampa Yankees	Florida State League	Pat Osborn
A	Charleston RiverDogs	South Atlantic League	Luis Dorante
A-Short Season	Staten Island Yankees	New York–Penn League	Dave Bialas
Rookie	Pulaski Yankees	Appalachian League	Tony Franklin
Rookie	GCL Yankees East	Gulf Coast League	Raul Dominguez
Rookie	GCL Yankees West	Gulf Coast League	Julio Mosquera
Rookie	DSL Yankees 1	Dominican Summer League	Sonder Encarnacion
Rookie	DSL Yankees 2	Dominican Summer League	Emilio Acosta

LEAGUE CHAMPIONS: Scranton/Wilkes-Barre
