= Ben Heller =

American baseball player (born 1991)

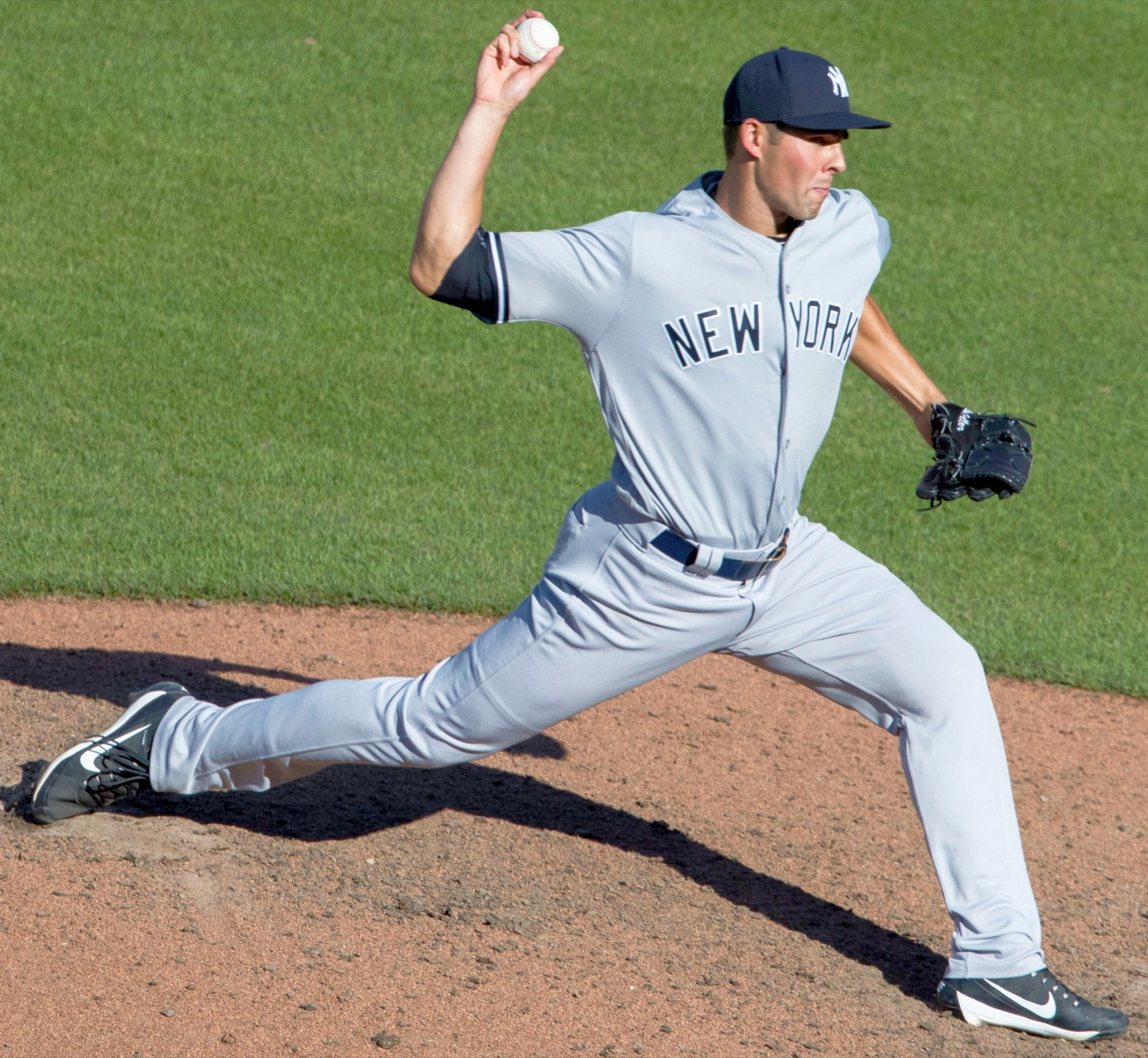
- Heller with the New York Yankees

Free agent
- Pitcher
- Born: August 5, 1991 (age 35); Milwaukee, Wisconsin, U.S.
- Bats: Right Throws: Right

MLB debut
- August 26, 2016, for the New York Yankees

MLB statistics (through 2024 season)
- Win–loss record: 2–1
- Earned run average: 4.65
- Strikeouts: 61
- Stats at Baseball Reference

Teams
- New York Yankees (2016–2017, 2019–2020); Atlanta Braves (2023); Pittsburgh Pirates (2024)

Benjamin Heller (born August 5, 1991) is an American professional baseball pitcher who is a free agent. He has previously played in Major League Baseball (MLB) for the New York Yankees, Atlanta Braves, and Pittsburgh Pirates.

== Career ==
=== Amateur ===
Heller attended Whitewater High School in Whitewater, Wisconsin, where he holds the school record for saves, pitched two no-hitters, and had a 1.14 ERA his senior year. Heller attended Olivet Nazarene University, where he played college baseball for the Olivet Nazarene Tigers. He played collegiate summer baseball with the Wisconsin Rapids Rafters. In 2012, he set a Rafters team record with 63 strikeouts. As a senior for Olivet Nazarene in 2013, Heller had an 8–4 win–loss record and a 3.42 earned run average (ERA).

=== Cleveland Indians ===
The Cleveland Indians selected Heller in the 22nd round of the 2013 Major League Baseball draft. He signed with Cleveland, receiving a $2,500 signing bonus. Heller made his professional debut with the Mahoning Valley Scrappers in 2013. He split the 2014 season between the Lake County Captains and Carolina Mudcats, combining for a 2.38 ERA with 81 strikeouts in 53 innings pitched. Heller began the 2015 season with the Lynchburg Hillcats and was promoted to the Akron RubberDucks during the season. Heller opened the 2016 season with Akron and was promoted to the Columbus Clippers.

=== New York Yankees ===
On July 31, 2016, the Indians traded Heller along with Clint Frazier, Justus Sheffield and J. P. Feyereisen to the New York Yankees in exchange for Andrew Miller. The Yankees promoted Heller to the major league roster on August 11, but he was returned to the minors without making an appearance. The Yankees promoted him again on August 23, and he made his major league debut on August 26, 2016, pitching a scoreless eighth inning against the Baltimore Orioles. Overall with the 2016 Yankees, Heller appeared in 10 games in relief, posting a 6.43 ERA with six strikeouts in seven innings. During the 2017 season, Heller split time between the Yankees and the Triple-A Scranton/Wilkes-Barre RailRiders. He appeared in nine major league games, striking out nine batters in 11 innings with a 0.82 ERA.

On April 6, 2018, Heller underwent Tommy John surgery, and subsequently missed the rest of the season. He returned to the Yankees in 2019, appearing in 6 games, all in relief, while posting a 1.23 ERA and striking out 9 batters in 7 1/3 innings. Initially not included on the Yankees' postseason roster, Heller was added after CC Sabathia suffered a shoulder injury in the fourth game of the ALCS. On September 2, 2020, Heller was ejected for the first time in his career after hitting Hunter Renfroe with a pitch.

Heller was designated for assignment on February 10, 2021, to make room on the 40-man roster for Darren O'Day. On February 12, Heller was released by the Yankees.

=== Arizona Diamondbacks ===
On February 20, 2021, Heller signed a minor league contract with the Arizona Diamondbacks organization. Heller suffered a stress fracture in his elbow, ending his season before it began, and he was released on April 20.

=== Minnesota Twins ===
On July 18, 2022, Heller signed a minor league deal with the Minnesota Twins. He made four rehab appearances for the rookie-level Florida Complex League Twins before being promoted to the Triple-A St. Paul Saints. Heller had a 21.60 ERA with three strikeouts in 1 2/3 innings pitched across three appearances before being released on September 5.

=== Tampa Bay Rays ===
On January 18, 2023, Heller signed a minor league contract with the Tampa Bay Rays organization. He began the year with the Triple-A Durham Bulls, posting a 3.91 ERA in 16 appearances. His contract was selected to the active roster on May 24. On June 2, following the acquisition of Robert Stephenson, Heller was designated for assignment by the Rays without having made an appearance for the team.

=== Atlanta Braves ===
On June 6, 2023, Heller was traded to the Atlanta Braves in exchange for international bonus pool money. He was recalled to the major leagues on June 15. Heller made his debut for the Braves on June 16, throwing five strikeouts with only one hit and one walk in two innings in a win against the Colorado Rockies. In 19 appearances for Atlanta, he posted a 3.86 ERA with 16 strikeouts in 18 2/3 innings pitched. Following the season on November 1, Heller was removed from the 40–man roster and sent outright to the Triple–A Gwinnett Stripers. However, Heller rejected the assignment and elected free agency.

=== Pittsburgh Pirates ===
On December 5, 2023, Heller signed a minor league contract with the Pittsburgh Pirates. He made 15 appearances for the Triple–A Indianapolis Indians, compiling a 4.91 ERA with 34 strikeouts across 18 1/3 innings pitched. On June 4, 2024, the Pirates selected Heller's contract, adding him to their active roster. He struggled immensely in two games for the Pirates, allowing 12 runs (11 earned) on nine hits with three strikeouts across two innings of work. During his second appearance on June 9, pitching the 10th inning against the Minnesota Twins, he hit three batters to match the 1974 performance of former Pirates pitcher Dock Ellis, who was hitting the batters intentionally. Heller was designated for assignment following the acquisition of Niko Goodrum on June 10. He cleared waivers and was sent outright to Indianapolis on June 13. On August 6, the Pirates selected Heller's contract, adding him back for their active roster. In 8 games for Pittsburgh, he struggled to an 11.25 ERA with 15 strikeouts over 12 innings. Heller was placed on the injured list with right shoulder inflammation on August 30, and was transferred to the 60–day injured list on September 18, ending his season. On November 4, he was removed from the 40–man roster and sent outright to Triple–A Indianapolis. Heller elected free agency the same day.

=== Chicago Cubs ===
On December 30, 2024, Heller signed a minor league contract with the Chicago Cubs. On March 25, 2025, Heller underwent Tommy John surgery, ruling him out for the 2025 season. He was released on May 23. Heller re-signed with Chicago on a new minor league contract on June 2.

On March 23, 2026, Heller was released by the Cubs organization.

== Personal life ==
Heller is the oldest of four children born to Bonnie and Brian Heller. His parents divorced after he graduated from high school. One of his younger brothers, Gabe, died by suicide at the age of 18 in 2015.

Heller and his wife, Martha, met while attending Olivet Nazarene University; she is an eighth grade math teacher. In 2017, Ben and his wife stayed together in Scranton, Pennsylvania, when Ben was pitching in the minor leagues and lived above a funeral parlor with Chad Green.
