= Conor Mullee =

American baseball player (born 1988)

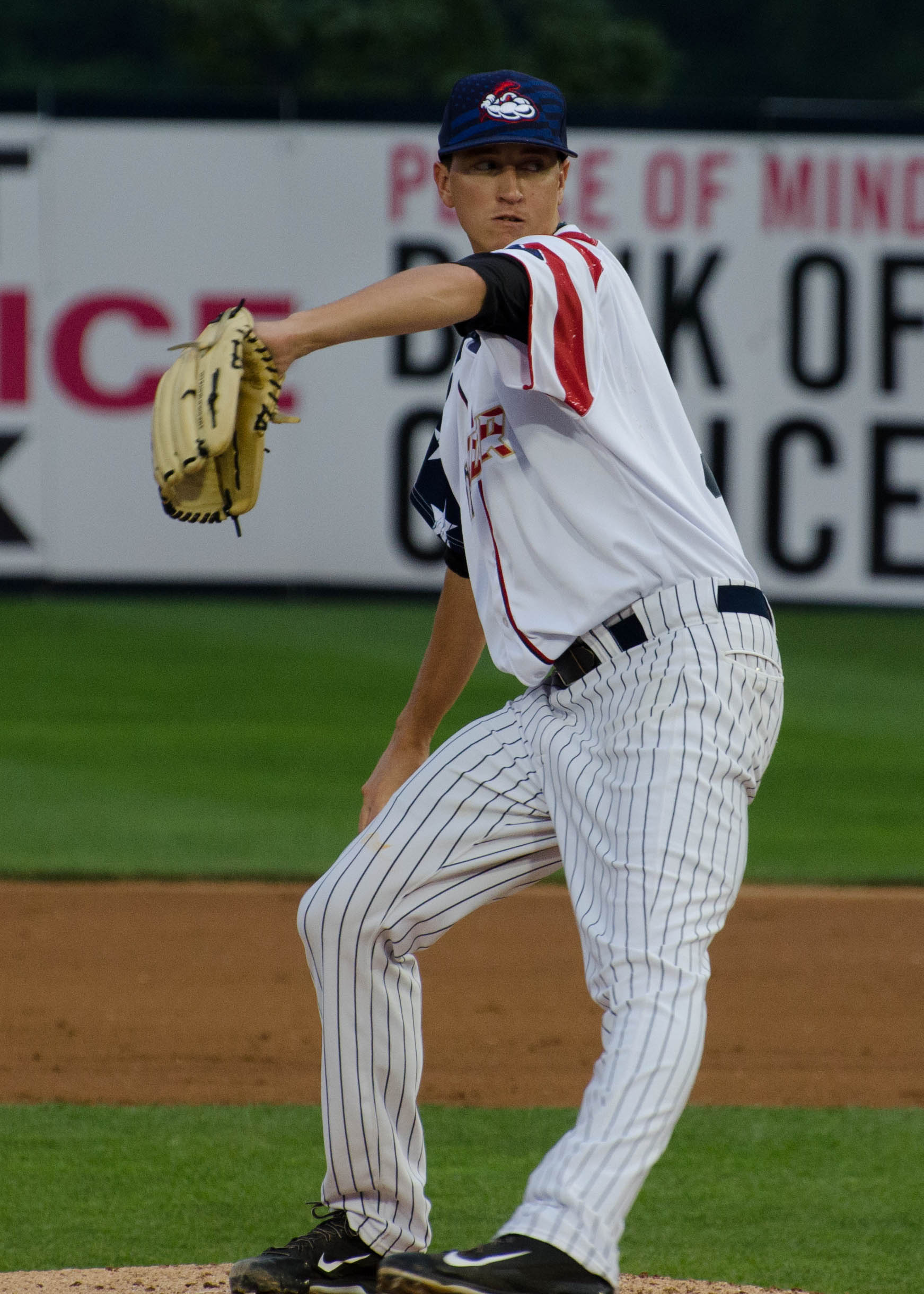
- Mullee with the Trenton Thunder in 2015
- Pitcher
- Born: February 25, 1988 (age 38); Ashburn, Virginia, U.S.
- Batted: Right Threw: Right

MLB debut
- May 16, 2016, for the New York Yankees

Last MLB appearance
- July 1, 2016, for the New York Yankees

MLB statistics
- Win–loss record: 0-0
- Earned run average: 3.00
- Strikeouts: 4
- Stats at Baseball Reference

Teams
- New York Yankees (2016)

Conor Joseph Mullee (born February 25, 1988) is an American former professional baseball pitcher. He played in Major League Baseball (MLB) for the New York Yankees.

== Career ==
=== New York Yankees ===
Mullee played college baseball at Saint Peter's College, primarily as an infielder but he was drafted by the New York Yankees in the 24th round of the 2010 Major League Baseball draft as a Right handed pitcher.

Unfortunately Mullee was forced to undergo Tommy John Surgery in June 2011 after experiencing elbow pain, he pitched five innings for the Staten Island Yankees before requiring surgery after suffering an avulsion fracture in which his repaired Ligament tore off the bone. This time a screw had to be used to hold the Ligament in place. Mullee was forced to undergo surgery a third time in February, 2013 after his bone failed to properly heal around the screw. Having thrown only five innings from 2011 to 2013 due to the elbow issues, he returned in 2014 and pitched well for the Staten Island Yankees and the Charleston RiverDogs and moved up the minor league ladder to the Yankees' Triple–A affiliate, the Scranton/Wilkes-Barre RailRiders, in 2015.

Mullee was called up to the majors for the first time on May 14, 2016. Mullee pitched in three games, giving up one run in three innings pitched before he was placed on the 15-day DL with nerve issue in his hand on July 3. The Yankees announced he would miss the rest of the season and subsequently put him on the 60 day disabled list on August 13.

=== Chicago Cubs ===
Mullee was claimed off waivers by the Chicago Cubs on November 2, 2016, On December 2, he was non–tendered by the Cubs and became a free agent.

On December 12, 2016, Mullee re–signed with the Cubs organization on a minor league contract that included an invitation to spring training. In 13 games for the Triple–A Iowa Cubs, he struggled to a 7.36 ERA with 13 strikeouts across 18 1/3 innings pitched. Mullee was released by Chicago on July 5, 2017.
