= Johnny Barbato =

American baseball player (born 1992)

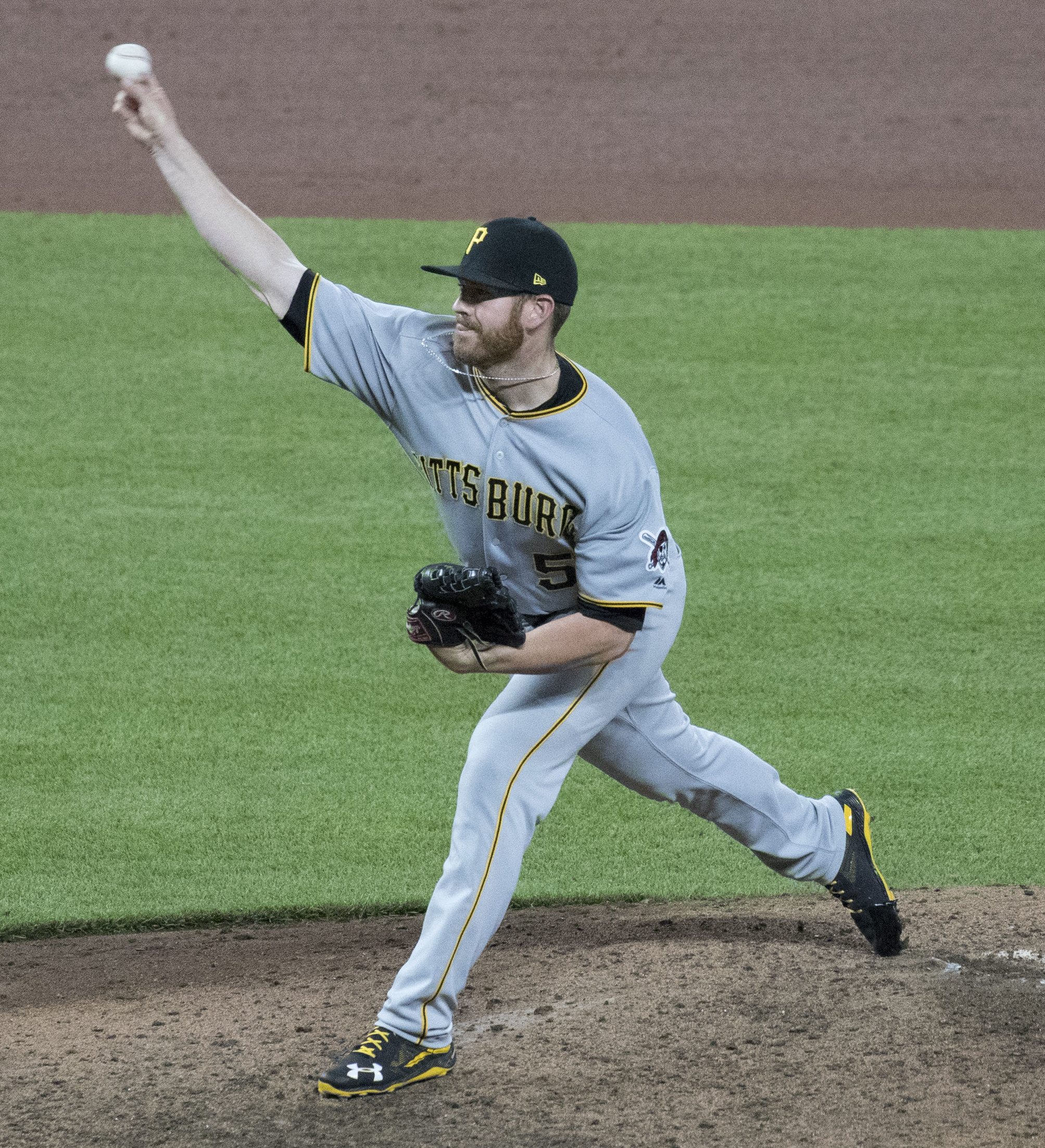
- Barbato with the Pittsburgh Pirates

Hagerstown Flying Boxcars
- Pitcher / Coach
- Born: July 11, 1992 (age 33); Miami, Florida, U.S.
- Bats: Right Throws: Right

Professional debut
- MLB: April 5, 2016, for the New York Yankees
- NPB: April 2, 2019, for the Hokkaido Nippon-Ham Fighters

MLB statistics (through 2018 season)
- Win–loss record: 1–3
- Earned run average: 6.14
- Strikeouts: 40

NPB statistics (through 2019 season)
- Win–loss record: 3–5
- Earned run average: 5.56
- Strikeouts: 49
- Stats at Baseball Reference

Teams
- New York Yankees (2016); Pittsburgh Pirates (2017); Detroit Tigers (2018); Hokkaido Nippon-Ham Fighters (2019)

John Edward Barbato (/bɑːrˈbeɪtoʊ/ bar-BAY-toh; born July 11, 1992) is an American professional baseball pitcher and coach for the Hagerstown Flying Boxcars of the Atlantic League of Professional Baseball. He has previously played in Major League Baseball (MLB) for the Pittsburgh Pirates, New York Yankees, and Detroit Tigers, and in Nippon Professional Baseball (NPB) for the Hokkaido Nippon-Ham Fighters.

== Playing career ==
Barbato attended Felix Varela High School in Miami, Florida. He received a scholarship from the University of Florida.

=== San Diego Padres ===
The San Diego Padres selected Barbato in the sixth round, with the 184th overall selection, of the 2010 Major League Baseball draft, and he signed with San Diego rather than attend college. He made his professional debut in 2011 with the Low–A Eugene Emeralds, posting a 4.89 ERA with 50 strikeouts in 15 appearances (13 starts). Barbato spent the 2012 season with the Single–A Fort Wayne TinCaps, making 48 appearances out of the bullpen and logging a 6–1 record and 1.84 ERA with 84 strikeouts across 73 1/3 innings.

In 2013, Barbato made 49 appearances for the High–A Lake Elsinore Storm, registering a 5.01 ERA with 89 strikeouts and 14 saves across 88 innings pitched. He made 27 relief outings for the Double–A San Antonio Missions in 2014, recording a 2.87 ERA with 33 strikeouts and 16 saves across 31 1/3 innings of work.

=== New York Yankees ===
On December 29, 2014, the Padres traded Barbato to the New York Yankees in exchange for Shawn Kelley. He made 40 appearances split between the Double–A Trenton Thunder and Triple–A Scranton/Wilkes-Barre RailRiders, accumulating a 6–2 record and 2.67 ERA with 70 strikeouts in 67 1/3 innings. The Yankees added him to their 40-man roster after the 2015 season.

Barbato made his major league debut on April 5, 2016. He was optioned down to Triple–A Scranton on May 9, recalled on August 4, and sent back again on August 6. In 13 games with the Yankees in 2016, Barbato had a 1–2 record with a 7.62 ERA.

Barbato was assigned to Triple–A Scranton to begin the 2017 season. On April 13, 2017, he was designated for assignment following the promotion of Jordan Montgomery.

=== Pittsburgh Pirates ===
On April 17, 2017, Barbato was traded to the Pittsburgh Pirates in exchange for Matt Frawley. In 24 relief appearances for the Pirates, Barbato posted a 4.08 ERA with 23 strikeouts in 28 2/3 innings.

=== Detroit Tigers ===
On January 11, 2018, Barbato was claimed off waivers by the Detroit Tigers. After starting the season with the Triple–A Toledo Mud Hens, Barbato was called up on April 26 and made his Tigers debut the following night against the Baltimore Orioles. Barbato was next called up on May 30. He was called up again on June 20. After giving up five earned runs in less than an inning two days later, Barbato was placed on the 10-day disabled list with shoulder tightness. He failed to mention previously that the injury had been bothering him all season, which left manager Rod Gardenhire somewhat perplexed since he asked to throw a light bullpen session earlier that day. He was designated for assignment on September 11. He was sent outright to the Toledo Mud Hens after clearing waivers two days later. Barbato elected free agency on November 2.

=== Hokkaido Nippon-Ham Fighters ===
On December 20, 2018, Barbato signed with the Hokkaido Nippon-Ham Fighters of Nippon Professional Baseball. In 15 appearances for the team, he compiled a 2-2 record and 5.63 ERA with 22 strikeouts over 32 innings of work. On October 11, 2019, the Fighters announced that Barbato would not be re-signed for the 2020 season. On October 18, he became a free agent.

=== Somerset Patriots ===
On January 27, 2020, Barbato signed with the Somerset Patriots of the Atlantic League of Professional Baseball. Barbato did not appear for the club in 2020 due to the cancellation of the ALPB season because to the COVID-19 pandemic. In July, Barbato signed on to play for the Sugar Land Lightning Sloths of the Constellation Energy League (a makeshift 4-team independent league created as a result of the COVID-19 pandemic) for the 2020 season. Barbato became a free agent after the year.

=== Lincoln Saltdogs ===
On January 27, 2021, Barbato signed with the Lincoln Saltdogs of the American Association of Professional Baseball. Barbato recorded a 0.90 ERA in two appearances for the Saltdogs, striking out 12 in 10 innings of work.

=== Toronto Blue Jays ===
On June 1, 2021, Barbato's contract was purchased by the Toronto Blue Jays organization. In 17 appearances (13 starts) for the Double-A New Hampshire Fisher Cats, he logged a 3-4 record and 4.35 ERA with 67 strikeouts across 70 1/3 innings pitched. Barbato elected free agency following the season on November 7.

=== High Point Rockers ===
On April 21, 2022, Barbato signed with the High Point Rockers of the Atlantic League of Professional Baseball. Barbato did not make an appearance for the Rockers before retiring from professional baseball on July 24.

=== Staten Island FerryHawks ===
On July 27, 2024, Barbato was activated as a player for the Staten Island FerryHawks of the Atlantic League of Professional Baseball, while concurrently serving as the club's pitching coach. He was released on July 30, without appearing in a game.

=== Piratas de Campeche ===
On July 2, 2025, Barbato signed with the Piratas de Campeche of the Mexican League. He made three appearances (one start) for Campeche, posting an 0-1 record and 5.79 ERA with three strikeouts over 4 2/3 innings pitched. Barbato was released by the Piratas on July 11.

=== Tigres de Quintana Roo ===
On July 11, 2025, Barbato signed with the Tigres de Quintana Roo of the Mexican League. In six appearances (one start) for Quintana Roo, he struggled to an 0-2 record and 8.22 ERA with six strikeouts across 7 2/3 innings pitched. Barbato was released by the Tigres on July 31.

=== Hagerstown Flying Boxcars ===
On April 16, 2026, Barbato signed with the Hagerstown Flying Boxcars of the Atlantic League of Professional Baseball as a player/coach.

== Coaching career ==
On February 7, 2024, Barbato was hired to serve as the pitching coach for the Staten Island FerryHawks of the Atlantic League of Professional Baseball.
