= Clint Frazier =

American baseball player (born 1994)

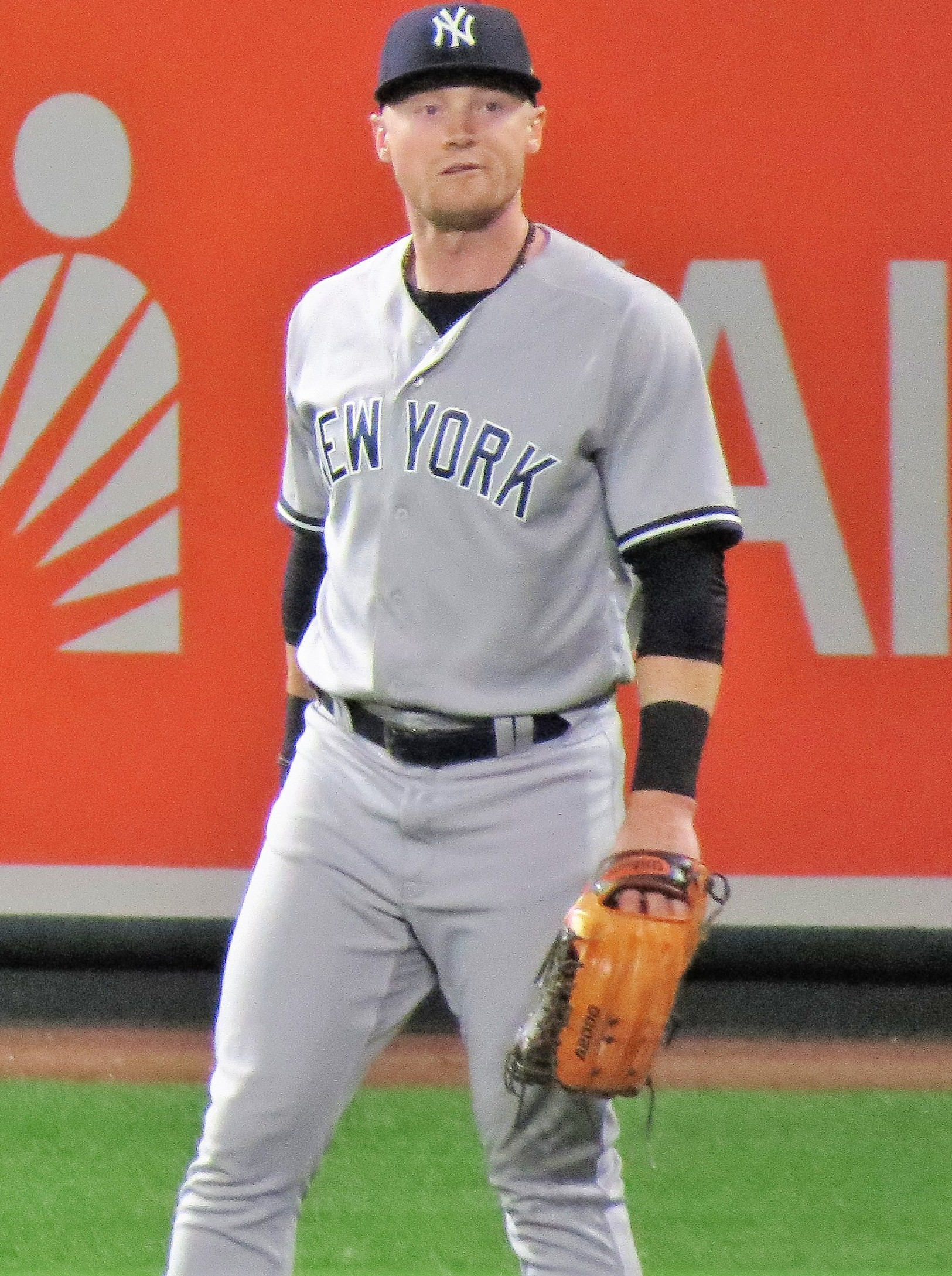
- Frazier with the Yankees in 2018
- Outfielder
- Born: September 6, 1994 (age 32); Loganville, Georgia, U.S.
- Batted: Right Threw: Right

MLB debut
- July 1, 2017, for the New York Yankees

Last MLB appearance
- July 2, 2023, for the Chicago White Sox

MLB statistics
- Batting average: .235
- Home runs: 29
- Runs batted in: 101
- Stats at Baseball Reference

Teams
- New York Yankees (2017–2021); Chicago Cubs (2022); Chicago White Sox (2023)

Clint Jackson Frazier (born September 6, 1994) is an American former professional baseball outfielder. He played in Major League Baseball (MLB) for the New York Yankees, Chicago Cubs and Chicago White Sox.

A top prospect entering the 2013 MLB draft, the Cleveland Indians chose Frazier with the fifth overall selection. The Indians traded Frazier (among other prospects) to the New York Yankees in 2016 for relief pitcher Andrew Miller. Frazier made his MLB debut in 2017. He played for the Yankees through 2021, and then for the Cubs in 2022, and for the White Sox in 2023. He briefly played in the Atlantic League in 2024 for the Charleston Dirty Birds, but retired mid-season.

== Early life and education ==
Frazier was born to Mark Frazier, a salesman, and his wife Kim, a preschool teacher. Despite living only 45 minutes from Atlanta, Frazier grew up a Philadelphia Phillies fan.

Frazier attended Loganville High School, where he competed in baseball with Austin Meadows. As a junior in 2012, he batted .424 with 24 home runs. He was the winner of the Jackie Robinson Award given to the Perfect Game National Player of the Year. He played in the 2012 Under Armour All-America Baseball Game. As a senior, he hit six home runs in his first seven games. Frazier finished his senior year with a .485 batting average, a .561 on-base percentage, a 1.134 slugging percentage, 17 home runs, 45 runs batted in (RBIs), and 56 runs scored. Gatorade named Frazier their National Baseball Player of the Year.

Frazier committed to attend the University of Georgia on a college baseball scholarship to play for the Georgia Bulldogs. He was considered one of the best prospects available in the 2013 Major League Baseball draft.

== Career ==
=== Cleveland Indians ===
The Cleveland Indians selected Frazier with the fifth overall selection of the 2013 MLB draft. He signed with the Indians instead of enrolling at the University of Georgia, receiving a $3.5 million signing bonus. The Indians assigned him to the Arizona Indians of the Rookie-level Arizona League for his professional debut. He hit a home run and a triple in his first professional game. In 44 games he batted .297/.392/.506 with five home runs and 28 RBIs.

In 2014, Frazier played for the Lake County Captains of the Single–A Midwest League where he batted .266 with 13 home runs and 50 RBIs in 120 games. In 2015, Frazier played for the Lynchburg Hillcats of the High–A Carolina League where he compiled a .285 batting average with 16 home runs and 72 RBIs in 133 games.

Frazier began the 2016 season with the Akron RubberDucks of the Double–A Eastern League. He was named to appear in the 2016 All Star Futures Game, where he went 2-for-3 with an RBI double and a stolen base. He was then promoted to the Columbus Clippers of the Triple–A International League on July 25.

=== New York Yankees ===
On July 31, 2016, the Indians traded Frazier along with Justus Sheffield, Ben Heller and J. P. Feyereisen to the New York Yankees for Andrew Miller. The Yankees assigned Frazier to the Scranton/Wilkes-Barre RailRiders of the International League. Frazier finished 2016 with a combined .263 batting average, 16 home runs and 55 RBIs in 119 games between the three clubs. Frazier began the 2017 season with Scranton/Wilkes-Barre. He played 73 games for the RailRiders before getting called up, posting a .257 average with 12 home runs, 42 RBIs and 9 steals.

The Yankees promoted Frazier to the major leagues on July 1, 2017. He doubled for his first major league hit that day and hit his first career home run in his next at-bat. On July 8, Frazier hit his first career walk-off, a home run off of Corey Knebel, giving the Yankees a 5-3 win over the Milwaukee Brewers. On July 19, Frazier changed his jersey number from No. 30 to No. 77, giving No. 30 back to the recently acquired David Robertson, who wore the number during his tenure with the Yankees from 2008 to 2014. Frazier stated that he appreciated the parallel between his No. 77 in left field and teammate Aaron Judge's No. 99 in right field. Frazier became the second Yankee ever with nine extra base hits before his 15th career game, after Joe DiMaggio. On August 10, Frazier was placed on the 10-day disabled list due to a left oblique strain. Frazier did not play during the post-season when the Yankees lost in Game 7 of the 2017 ALCS.

Frazier began the 2018 season on the disabled list with a concussion. He was reactivated in early May, and assigned to Scranton/Wilkes-Barre. On May 15, he was called up to the Major Leagues. On May 21, he was optioned to Triple-A. On June 4, he was called up again before being optioned to Triple-A on the next day. On June 18, he was called up for the third time of the season. In a game against the Rays at Tropicana Field on June 22, Frazier entered the game in the ninth inning as a pinch-hitter and appeared to have hit a home run that could have given the Yankees the lead, but the ball hit a speaker and dropped down for a pop-out. He was sent down on the next day. On July 8, Frazier was once again called up to the Major Leagues as starting center fielder Aaron Hicks was banged up. On September 5, manager Aaron Boone said that Frazier would miss the rest of the season to get treatment for ongoing symptoms caused by the concussion he suffered earlier in the year.

During 2019 spring training, manager Aaron Boone announced that Frazier would likely start the season in the minors. Frazier was first called up on April 2 in response to the Yankees having three injured outfielders at once: Giancarlo Stanton, Aaron Hicks, and Jacoby Ellsbury. On April 6, Frazier pinch hit in the 6th inning against the Baltimore Orioles. He hit a go-ahead three-run home run to the left field seats that ultimately gave the Yankees the win. The following day, Frazier hit two home runs in a 15-3 win against the Orioles. On June 2, New York trailed Boston 3-2 in the seventh inning when Frazier let Eduardo Núñez’s sharp single get under his glove for a two-base error that allowed Michael Chavis to score from first base. Three batters later, Frazier dived and missed Andrew Benintendi’s liner, which fell for a single as Brock Holt scored from first. Then in the eighth, he took a bad route on Chavis’ ball near the right-field line, letting it skip by for an RBI triple as fans booed. He did not speak to reporters following the defeat. Due to his poor defense and attitude, Frazier was optioned back to the minors on June 16 when the Yankees acquired Edwin Encarnación.

Frazier made the opening roster for the Covid-delayed 2020 season, but was sent down to the alternate training site just two games into the season, on July 26, without having appeared in a game. Frazier was later recalled from the alternate training site on August 11 after Giancarlo Stanton was placed on the injured list. In his first game of the season the next day, Frazier went 3-for-4, including a home run in his first at-bat and a double in the sixth inning. He took over duty as the starting left fielder for the Yankees in September 2020. In 39 games in 2020, Frazier slashed .267/.394/.511 with eight home runs.

Frazier removed himself from a game on June 30, 2021, complaining of dizziness, and two days later was placed on the Yankees’ injured list. He underwent neurological testing in July, and was sent on a minor league rehab assignment in August. On September 12, Yankees manager Aaron Boone announced that Frazier would miss the remainder of the season. Frazier was designated for assignment by the Yankees on November 19, then released four days later.

=== Chicago Cubs ===
On December 1, 2021, Frazier signed a one-year $1.5 million major league contract with the Chicago Cubs. On April 22, 2022, he had surgery for appendicitis and went on the injured list. The Cubs activated Frazier on May 28. He batted .216 without a home run in 45 plate appearances, then was designated for assignment on June 10. Frazier cleared waivers and chose to accept a minor-league assignment with the Iowa Cubs of the Pacific Coast League, allowing him to continue to receive his major-league salary. He elected free agency on October 6, 2022.

=== Texas Rangers ===
On January 27, 2023, Frazier signed a minor league contract with the Texas Rangers organization. He was assigned to the Triple-A Round Rock Express to begin the year, where he made 15 appearances and hit .250/.350/.442 with 1 home run and 4 RBI. On April 24, Frazier and the Rangers mutually agreed to part ways, and he became a free agent.

=== Chicago White Sox ===
On April 28, 2023, Frazier signed a minor league contract with the Chicago White Sox and was assigned to the Triple-A Charlotte Knights. He played in 16 games for Charlotte, batting .375/.478/.839 with seven home runs and 13 RBI. On May 21, he was promoted to the major leagues. He batted .197 in 33 games before he was optioned to Charlotte in July. Following the season on November 3, Frazier was removed from the 40–man roster and sent outright to Triple–A Charlotte. He elected free agency on November 6.

=== Charleston Dirty Birds ===
On May 10, 2024, Frazier signed with the Charleston Dirty Birds of the Atlantic League of Professional Baseball. In 44 games for Charleston, he batted .258/.362/.443 with six home runs, 28 RBI, and nine stolen bases. On July 3, Frazier retired from professional baseball.

== Personal life ==
Frazier has one older sister. His family is Christian and of Scottish ancestry.

On June 22, 2022, Frazier told a broadcaster for the Iowa Cubs that he wanted to be called by his middle name, Jackson, moving forward. After using his middle name for a portion of the 2022 season, Frazier claimed that the decision was part of "a joke that just went too far," and thereafter continued to go by Clint.
