= Justus Sheffield =

American baseball player (born 1996)

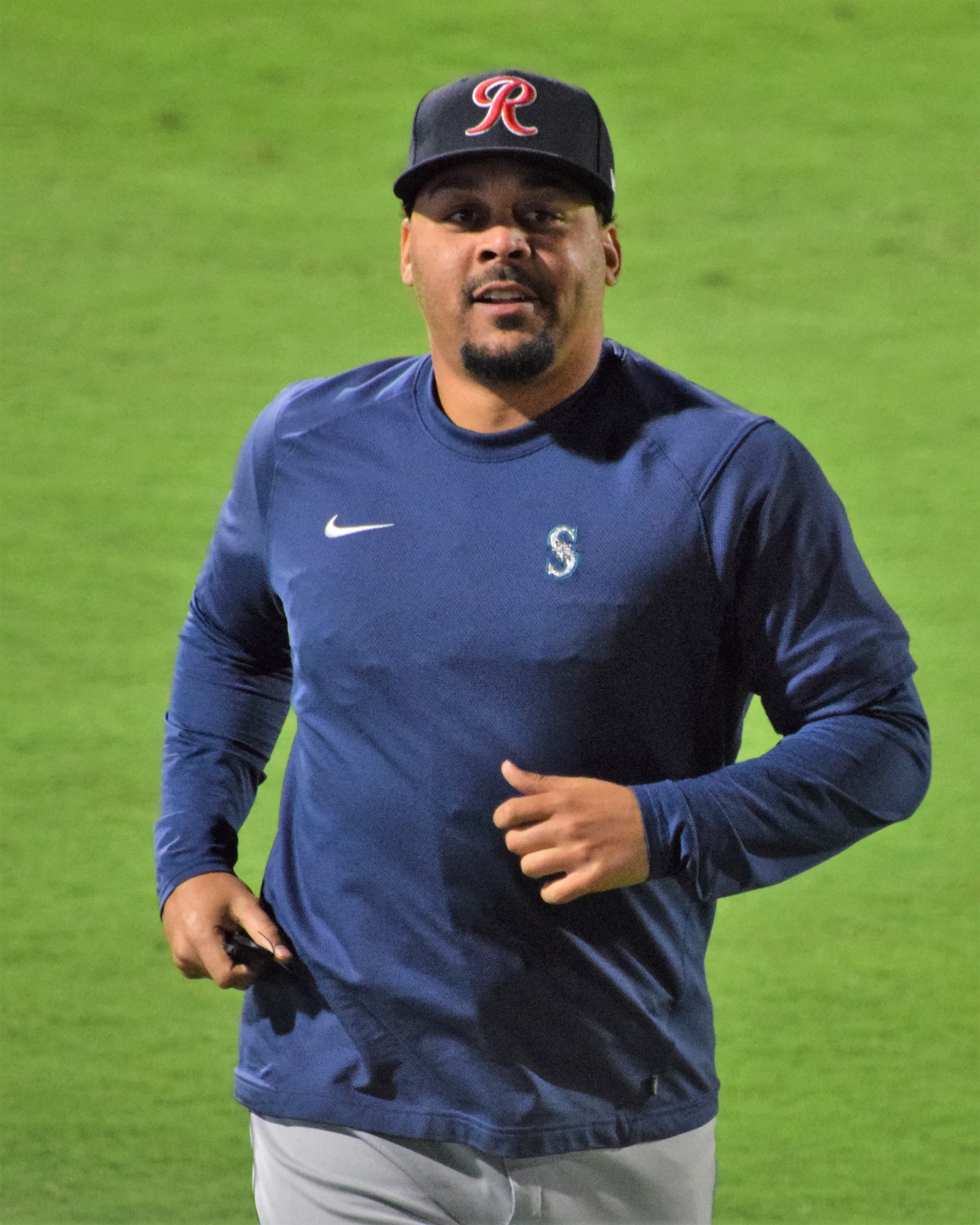
- Sheffield with the Seattle Mariners in 2023

Sultanes de Monterrey – No. 61
- Pitcher
- Born: May 13, 1996 (age 30); Tullahoma, Tennessee, U.S.
- Bats: Left Throws: Left

MLB debut
- September 19, 2018, for the New York Yankees

MLB statistics (through 2022 season)
- Win–loss record: 12–12
- Earned run average: 5.47
- Strikeouts: 155
- Stats at Baseball Reference

Teams
- New York Yankees (2018); Seattle Mariners (2019–2022)
Medals
Men's baseball
Representing United States
18U Baseball World Cup
Gold medal – first place	2013 Taichung	Team

Justus Kane Sheffield (born May 13, 1996) is an American professional baseball pitcher for the Sultanes de Monterrey of the Mexican League. He has previously played in Major League Baseball (MLB) for the New York Yankees and Seattle Mariners.

He was drafted by the Cleveland Indians in the first round of the 2014 MLB draft. During the 2016 trade deadline, he was traded to the Yankees, where he made his MLB debut on September 19, 2018. Following the 2018 season, Sheffield was traded to the Seattle Mariners.

== Career ==
=== Amateur ===
Sheffield attended Tullahoma High School in Tullahoma, Tennessee. He threw two no-hitters in high school, including a 17–strikeout game as a senior. He finished his senior season with an 11-0 record, a 0.34 earned run average (ERA), and 131 strikeouts in 61 2/3 innings pitched. He also batted .405/.478/.620 with three home runs. He was named the Gatorade National Baseball Player of the Year. In June 2013, he was named to the USA Baseball 18 and under national team roster. The team won the 2013 18U Baseball World Cup in Taichung, Taiwan. Sheffield committed to play college baseball at Vanderbilt University.

=== Cleveland Indians ===
The Cleveland Indians selected Sheffield in the first round (31st overall) of the 2014 MLB draft, and he signed with Cleveland, bypassing Vanderbilt. In 2015, he pitched for the Lake County Captains of the Single-A Midwest League. He threw 127 2/3 innings, and had a 9-4 record and a 3.31 ERA and was a Midwest League Mid-Season All-Star. Sheffield began the 2016 season with the Lynchburg Hillcats of the High-A Carolina League. He was a Carolina League Mid-Season All-Star after pitching to a 3.59 ERA in 19 games over 95.1 innings.

=== New York Yankees ===
On July 31, 2016, the Indians traded Sheffield along with Clint Frazier, Ben Heller, and J. P. Feyereisen to the New York Yankees for Andrew Miller. He finished the 2016 season with the Tampa Yankees of the High-A Florida State League, where he posted a 10-6 record with a 3.09 ERA. Before the 2017 season, Baseball America ranked Sheffield as the 7th best prospect in the Yankees organization. Baseball Prospectus ranked him 5th. He spent 2017 with the Trenton Thunder of the Double-A Eastern League, going 7-6 with a 3.18 ERA in 93 1/3 innings pitched. Sheffield was named Eastern League Pitcher of the Week for the weeks of May 28 and June 18 and was named a Mid-Season All-Star. He later played in the Arizona Fall League and was a 2017 Rising Star.

After starting 2018 in Double-A, Sheffield was promoted to the Scranton/Wilkes-Barre RailRiders of the Triple-A International League on May 3, 2018. He was the 12th, 28th, and 40th best prospect in baseball, according to ESPN's, MLB's, and Baseball Prospectus' respective mid-season prospect lists. Sheffield was also named to the 2018 All-Star Futures Game. In August, the Yankees converted him into a relief pitcher in preparation for a September call-up to the major leagues.

He made his MLB debut on September 19 against the Boston Red Sox and gave up a single to his first batter, Brock Holt.

=== Seattle Mariners ===
On November 19, 2018, the Yankees traded Sheffield, Dom Thompson-Williams, and Erik Swanson to the Seattle Mariners for James Paxton. He was the team's top prospect in 2019, according to MLB.com. Sheffield was called up on April 26, 2019 and allowed two runs and four walks over three innings of relief. He pitched to a 6.87 ERA in 13 appearances for the Triple-A Tacoma Rainiers before the Mariners demoted him to the Double-A Arkansas Travelers. This was enough for Baseball America to drop him from 27th to 83rd on its top 100 prospect list. Sheffield rebounded with a 2.18 ERA in 78 innings and returned to the Mariners on August 23. He finished the season with a 5.50 ERA over 36 innings for the Mariners.

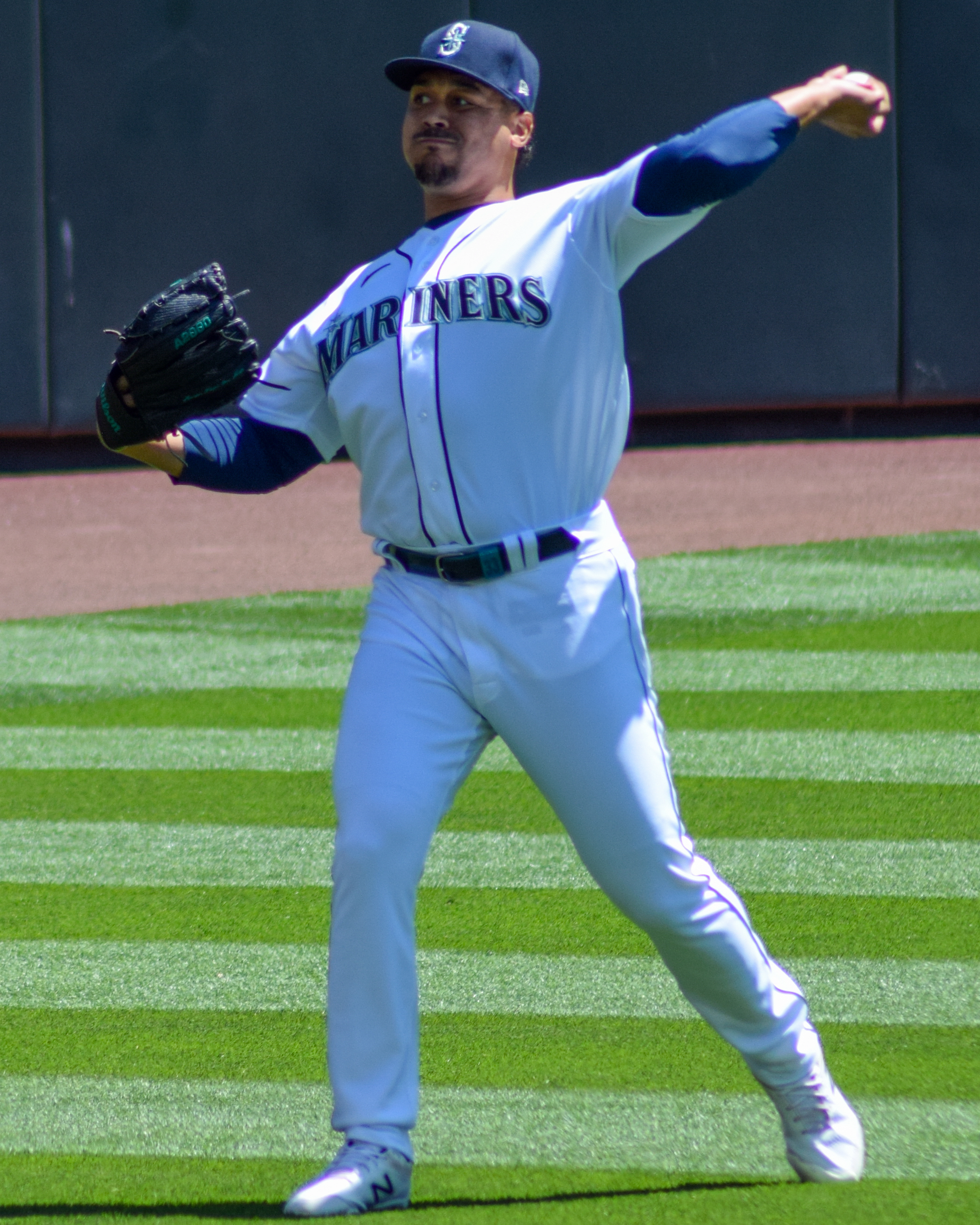
Sheffield in 2021

In 2020, Sheffield was included on the Mariners' 60-man player pool during the COVID-19 shortened season. He was part of the team's six-man starting rotation to begin the season, pitching to a 3.58 ERA in 10 starts. In 2021, Sheffield had a 6.48 ERA in 15 starts before hitting the injured list with a forearm strain in July. He was reinstated on September 1 and pitched of the bullpen. He allowed eight earned runs in 6.2 innings and was demoted before the end of 2021.

In 2022, Sheffield made the team out of spring training as a reliever. He made four appearances in April before being sent down to Tacoma. He was twice recalled from Tacoma during the season. His final appearance for the Mariners was a start on October 4, earning a win and allowing four runs in five innings pitched. For the year, he appeared in 6 games, with one start, pitching 11.2 innings in total. He finished with a record of 1-0 and a 3.86 ERA.

Sheffield was designated for assignment on January 19, 2023, to make room for Tommy La Stella on the roster. On January 26, Sheffield cleared waivers and was sent outright to Triple-A Tacoma. In 10 games with Tacoma to begin the year, Sheffield pitched poorly, with a 14.04 ERA and 4 strikeouts in 8.1 innings pitched. He was released by the Mariners organization on April 27.

=== Atlanta Braves ===
On May 12, 2023, Sheffield signed a minor league contract with the Atlanta Braves organization. He spent the remainder of the season with the Triple-A Gwinnett Stripers, also appearing in one game for the Double-A Mississippi Braves. In 13 games (11 starts) for Gwinnett, Sheffield logged a 2–5 record and 6.63 ERA with 56 strikeouts across 54 1/3 innings pitched. He elected free agency following the season on November 6.

=== Cincinnati Reds ===
On June 7, 2024, Sheffield signed a minor league contract with the Cincinnati Reds. In 19 appearances split between the rookie-level Arizona Complex League Reds and Triple-A Louisville Bats, he struggled to a combined 1-7 record and 6.75 ERA with 46 strikeouts across 46 2/3 innings pitched. Sheffield elected free agency following the season on November 4.

=== Gastonia Ghost Peppers ===
On April 18, 2025, Sheffield signed with the Gastonia Ghost Peppers of the Atlantic League of Professional Baseball. In 15 appearances (six starts) for Gastonia, Sheffield logged a 5-2 record and 5.27 ERA with 33 strikeouts across 42 2/3 innings pitched.

=== Sultanes de Monterrey ===
On July 2, 2025, Sheffield's contract was purchased by the Sultanes de Monterrey of the Mexican League. In 5 starts he threw 24 innings going 0-3 with a 3.38 ERA with 23 strikeouts.

== Personal life ==
His brother, Jordan Sheffield, pitched for the Colorado Rockies.

Sheffield was arrested on January 12, 2015 and charged with underage drinking and aggravated burglary. He pleaded guilty at Coffee County Court House in Tullahoma, Tennessee to charges of underage drinking and criminal trespass with a deferred judgment, so that the charges could be expunged from his record in a year.
