= J. P. Feyereisen =

American baseball player (born 1993)

J.P. Feyereisen
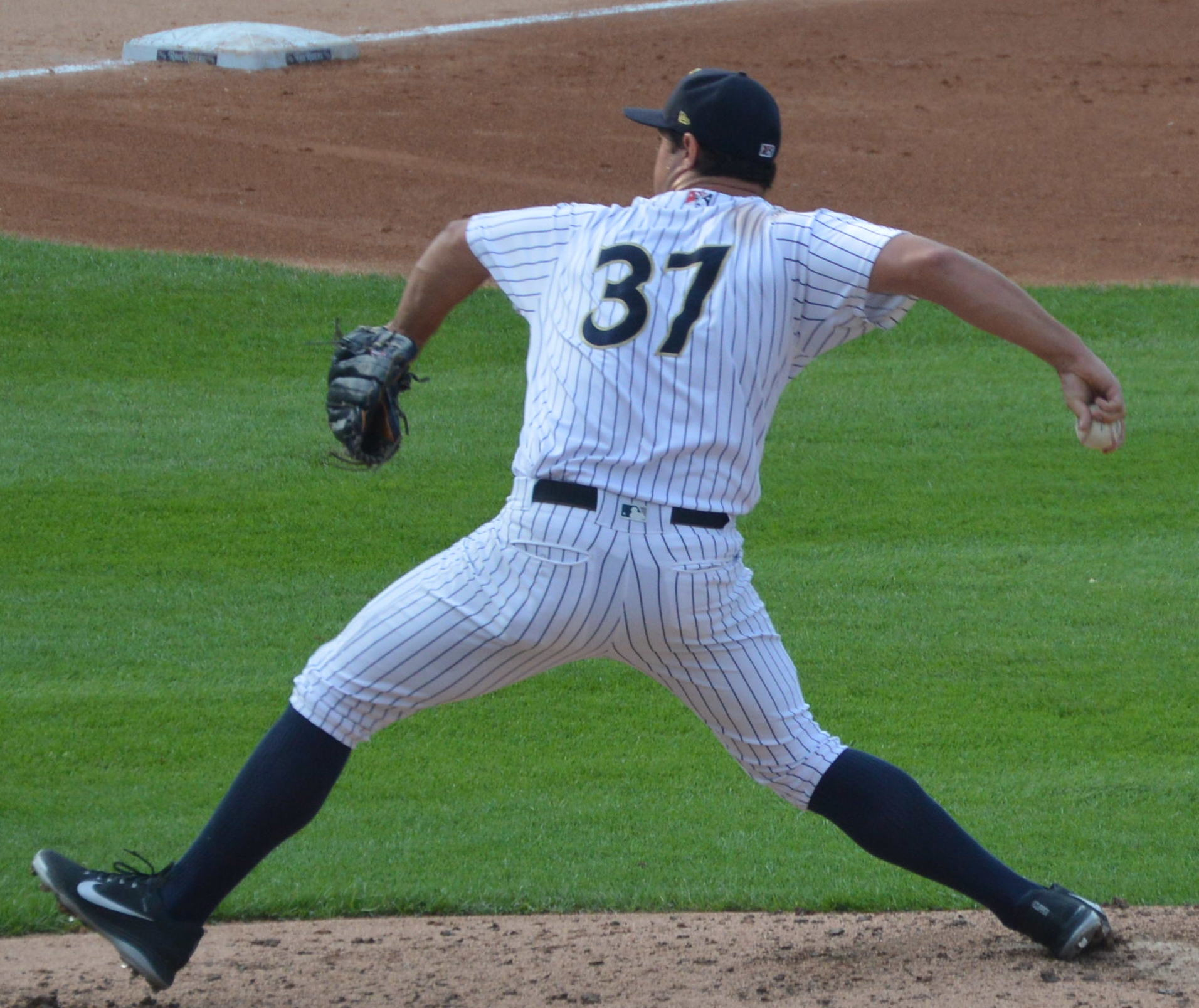
- Feyereisen with the Scranton/Wilkes-Barre RailRiders in 2018

Free agent
- Pitcher
- Born: February 7, 1993 (age 33); River Falls, Wisconsin, U.S.
- Bats: Right Throws: Right

MLB debut
- July 24, 2020, for the Milwaukee Brewers

MLB statistics (through 2025 season)
- Win–loss record: 8–7
- Earned run average: 3.27
- Strikeouts: 98
- Stats at Baseball Reference

Teams
- Milwaukee Brewers (2020–2021); Tampa Bay Rays (2021–2022); Los Angeles Dodgers (2024); Arizona Diamondbacks (2025); Los Angeles Dodgers (2025)

Jonathon Paul Feyereisen (born February 7, 1993) is an American professional baseball pitcher who is a free agent. He has previously played in Major League Baseball (MLB) for the Milwaukee Brewers, Tampa Bay Rays, Los Angeles Dodgers, and Arizona Diamondbacks. He made his MLB debut in 2020.

== Career ==
=== Amateur career ===
Feyereisen attended River Falls High School in River Falls, Wisconsin and played college baseball at the University of Wisconsin at Stevens Point, and summer collegiate baseball with the Wisconsin Rapids Rafters.

=== Cleveland Indians ===
The Cleveland Indians selected Feyereisen in the 16th round of the 2014 Major League Baseball (MLB) draft. He signed with the Indians and was assigned to the Mahoning Valley Scrappers, where he spent the whole season, pitching 17 scoreless innings, striking out 24.

In 2015, he played for both the Lake County Captains and the Lynchburg Hillcats, posting a combined 1–1 win–loss record with 12 saves and a 2.08 earned run average (ERA) in 47 2/3 innings pitched, in which he struck out 56 batters between the two teams. In 2016, he began the season with the Akron RubberDucks.

=== New York Yankees ===
On July 31, 2016, the Indians traded Feyereisen along with Clint Frazier, Justus Sheffield, and Ben Heller to the New York Yankees in exchange for Andrew Miller. The Yankees assigned him to the Trenton Thunder where he finished the season. In 42 games between both Akron and Trenton, he pitched to a 7–3 record, five saves, 1.70 ERA, and a 1.10 WHIP as he had 78 strikeouts in 58 1/3 innings.

In 2017, he spent time with both Trenton and the Scranton/Wilkes-Barre RailRiders, posting a combined 2–3 record with four saves and a 3.27 ERA in 63 1/3 total innings between both clubs and in 2018, he remained with Scranton/Wilkes-Barre, going 6–6 with one save and a 3.45 ERA in 60 innings. He returned to Scranton/Wilkes-Barre for the 2019 season, going 10–2 with seven saves and a 2.49 ERA and 94 strikeouts in 61 innings.

=== Milwaukee Brewers ===
On September 2, 2019, Feyereisen was traded to the Milwaukee Brewers in exchange for Brenny Escanio and international signing bonus pool money. On October 10, he was selected for the United States national baseball team in the 2019 WBSC Premier 12 and was added to the Brewers 40-man roster.

Feyereisen made the 2020 opening day roster for the Brewers and made his major league debut on July 24, pitching one inning. He struck out former MVP Kris Bryant, then giving up a solo home run to Anthony Rizzo against the Chicago Cubs. He pitched in six games, with a 5.79 ERA that season and in 2021, in 21 appearances with the Brewers, Feyereisen went 0–2 with a 3.26 ERA and a WHIP of 1.09.

=== Tampa Bay Rays ===
On May 21, 2021, the Brewers traded Feyereisen and Drew Rasmussen to the Tampa Bay Rays in exchange for Willy Adames and Trevor Richards. He made 34 appearances for the Rays that season, with a 4–2 record and 2.45 ERA. In 2022, he allowed one unearned run in 24 1/3 innings pitched, limiting opposing hitters to a .086 batting average against, before injuring his shoulder in June.

After the 2022 season, Feyereisen underwent surgery to repair the labrum and rotator cuff in his right shoulder and on December 13, he was designated for assignment by the Rays.

=== Los Angeles Dodgers ===
On December 14, 2022, the Rays traded Feyereisen to the Los Angeles Dodgers in exchange for minor league pitcher Jeff Belge. He continued to rehab his injury all season and did not appear in a game in 2023. After the season, he agreed to a $770,000 contract with the Dodgers for the following season in his first time in salary arbitration. He made his Dodgers debut by pitching one inning on March 21, 2024, against the San Diego Padres in South Korea and he was then optioned to the Triple-A Oklahoma City Baseball Club the next day. In 10 games for the Dodgers, he struggled to an 8.18 ERA with nine strikeouts across 11 innings pitched. On July 3, Feyereisen was removed from the 40–man roster and sent outright to Oklahoma City. In 33 games in the minors in 2024, he had a 2–6 record and 5.48 ERA in 42 2/3 innings. Feyereisen elected free agency on October 10.

=== Arizona Diamondbacks ===
On March 15, 2025, Feyereisen signed a minor league contract with the Arizona Diamondbacks. He began the year with the Triple-A Reno Aces, and posted an 0.96 ERA in his first seven games. On April 19, the Diamondbacks selected Feyereisen's contract, adding him to their active roster. In two appearances for Arizona, he logged an 0-1 record and 9.00 ERA with two strikeouts over two innings of work. Feyereisen was designated for assignment by the Diamondbacks on April 27.

=== Los Angeles Dodgers (second stint) ===
On May 1, 2025, Feyereisen was claimed off waivers by the Dodgers. He appeared in two games in Los Angeles, allowing three earned runs on eight hits and a walk in two innings. He also pitched 2 2/3 innings for the Triple-A Oklahoma City Comets, allowing two runs on six hits. Feyereisen was designated for assignment by the Dodgers on May 25 and became a free agent two days later after rejecting an outright assignment to the minors.
