= Luis Cessa =

Mexican baseball player (born 1992)

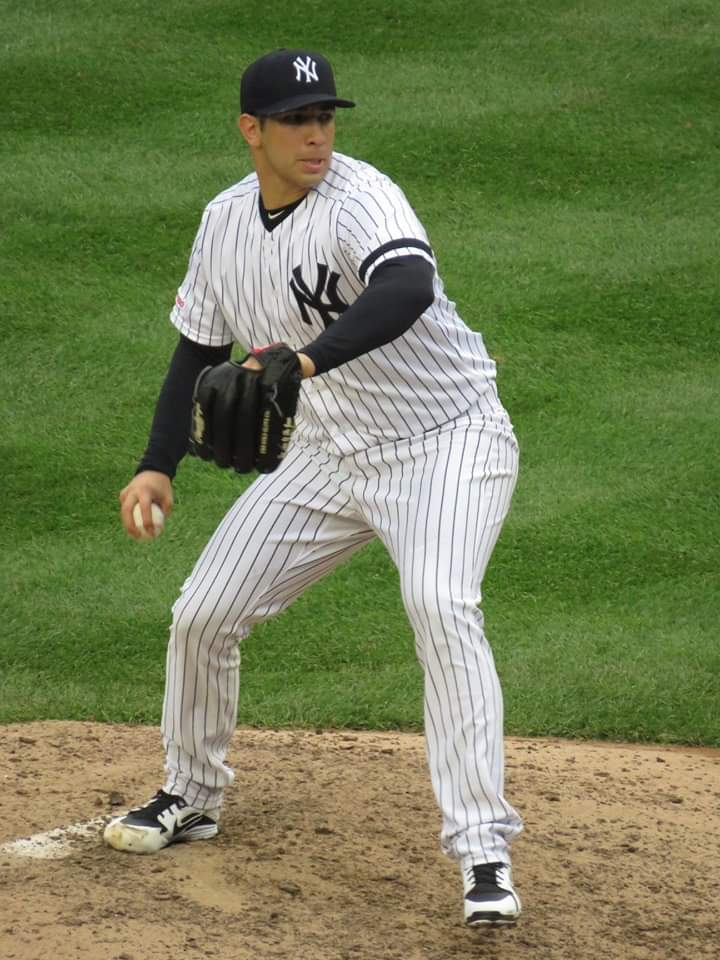
- Cessa with the New York Yankees in 2019

Free agent
- Pitcher
- Born: April 25, 1992 (age 34); Córdoba, Veracruz, Mexico
- Bats: Right Throws: Right

MLB debut
- April 8, 2016, for the New York Yankees

MLB statistics (through 2023 season)
- Win–loss record: 17–22
- Earned run average: 4.43
- Strikeouts: 331
- Stats at Baseball Reference

Teams
- New York Yankees (2016–2021); Cincinnati Reds (2021–2023)
Medals
Men's baseball
Representing Mexico
World Baseball Classic
Bronze medal – third place	2023 Miami	Team

Luis Enrique Cessa (born April 25, 1992) is a Mexican professional baseball pitcher who is a free agent. He has previously played in Major League Baseball (MLB) for the New York Yankees and Cincinnati Reds. He made his MLB debut in 2016.

== Professional career ==
=== New York Mets ===
Cessa signed with the New York Mets organization as an international free agent on July 9, 2008. He made his professional debut as a shortstop in 2009 with the Dominican Summer League Mets, hitting .191/.379/.258 with one home run and nine runs batted in (RBIs) in 34 games. The following season, Cessa returned to the team and hit .162/.230/.191 with no home runs and three RBIs in 23 games.

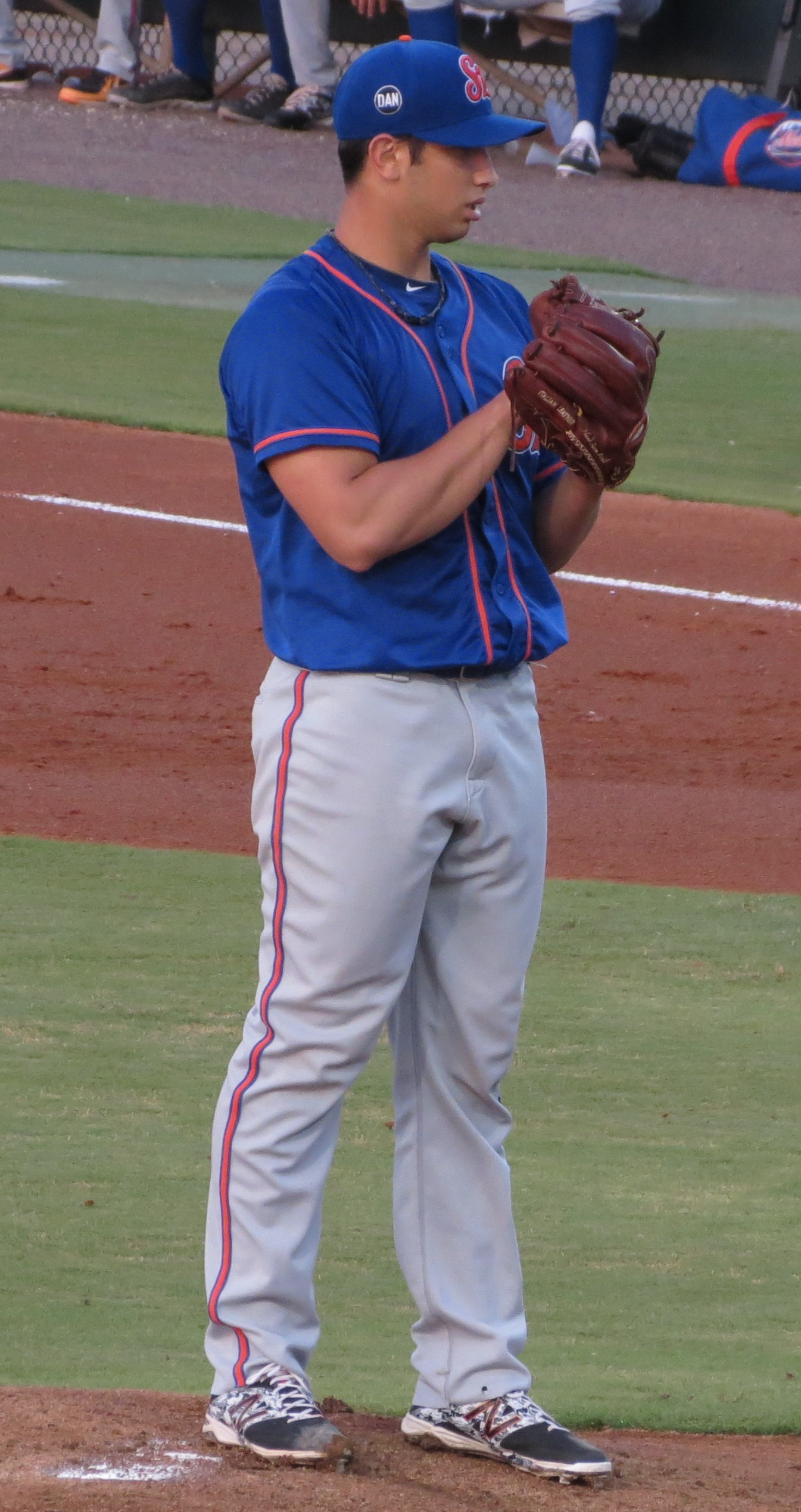
Cessa pitching for the St. Lucie Mets in 2014

In 2011, Cessa transitioned into a pitcher with the DSL Mets, and also pitched for the rookie-level GCL Mets, accumulating a 4–3 win–loss record and 3.19 earned run average (ERA) in 15 games. In 2012, Cessa pitched in 13 games for the Low-A Brooklyn Cyclones, registering a 5–4 record and 2.49 ERA. The following season, Cessa recorded an 8–4 record and 3.12 ERA in 21 games for the Single-A Savannah Sand Gnats. In 2014, Cessa spent the season with the High-A St. Lucie Mets, also appearing in one game for the Double-A Binghamton Mets, and pitched to a 7–9 record and 4.26 ERA in 21 games. Cessa began the 2015 season in Binghamton, and received a promotion to the Triple-A Las Vegas 51s after logging a 2.56 ERA in 13 games for Binghamton.

=== Detroit Tigers ===
On July 31, 2015, the Mets traded Cessa and Michael Fulmer to the Detroit Tigers in exchange for Yoenis Céspedes. Cessa finished the year with the Triple-A Toledo Mud Hens, posting a 1–3 record and 5.97 ERA with 34 strikeouts in 37 2/3 innings of work. Cessa was added to the Tigers' 40-man roster after the season.

=== New York Yankees ===
On December 9, 2015, the Tigers traded Cessa and Chad Green to the New York Yankees for Justin Wilson. Cessa was named to the Yankees' Opening Day roster in 2016. He made his major league debut for the Yankees on April 8. He pitched two innings, allowing two hits, one home run, and two strikeouts as the Yankees were shut out by the Detroit Tigers, 4–0. The Yankees optioned Cessa to the Scranton/Wilkes-Barre RailRiders of the Triple-A International League on April 15, 2016, in exchange for Tyler Olson. On May 17, the Yankees recalled Cessa from Triple-A. On June 7, the Yankees optioned him to Triple-A. On June 26, the Yankees recalled Cessa from Scranton/Wilkes-Barre. On June 29, Cessa earned his first Major League win, pitching 3 innings of 1-run relief. Cessa finished his rookie season with a 4–4 record and 4.35 ERA in 17 appearances.

Cessa began the 2017 season with Scranton/Wilkes-Barre, before being recalled in June. In August, after making a spot start for the Yankees, Cessa was placed on the disabled list due to a rib cage injury that would ultimately end his season. Cessa had recorded a 4.75 ERA in 10 games before his injury. Cessa again spent most of the 2018 season with Scranton/Wilkes-Barre and was used in a variety of roles by the Yankees in the majors. Cessa started 5 games and finished 6, recording a pair of three-inning saves. He finished the year with a 1–4 record and 5.24 ERA.

Cessa spent the 2019 season as a full-time reliever for the Yankees, pitching to a 4.11 ERA and a 8.3 K/9 in 81 innings pitched.

On July 4, 2020, it was announced that Cessa had tested positive for COVID-19. In 16 games for the Yankees in the pandemic-shortened 2020 season, Cessa recorded a 3.32 ERA and 7.1 K/9 in 16 appearances.

In 29 appearances for the Yankees in 2021, Cessa posted a 3–1 record with a 2.82 ERA and 31 strikeouts in 38 1/3 innings pitched.

=== Cincinnati Reds ===
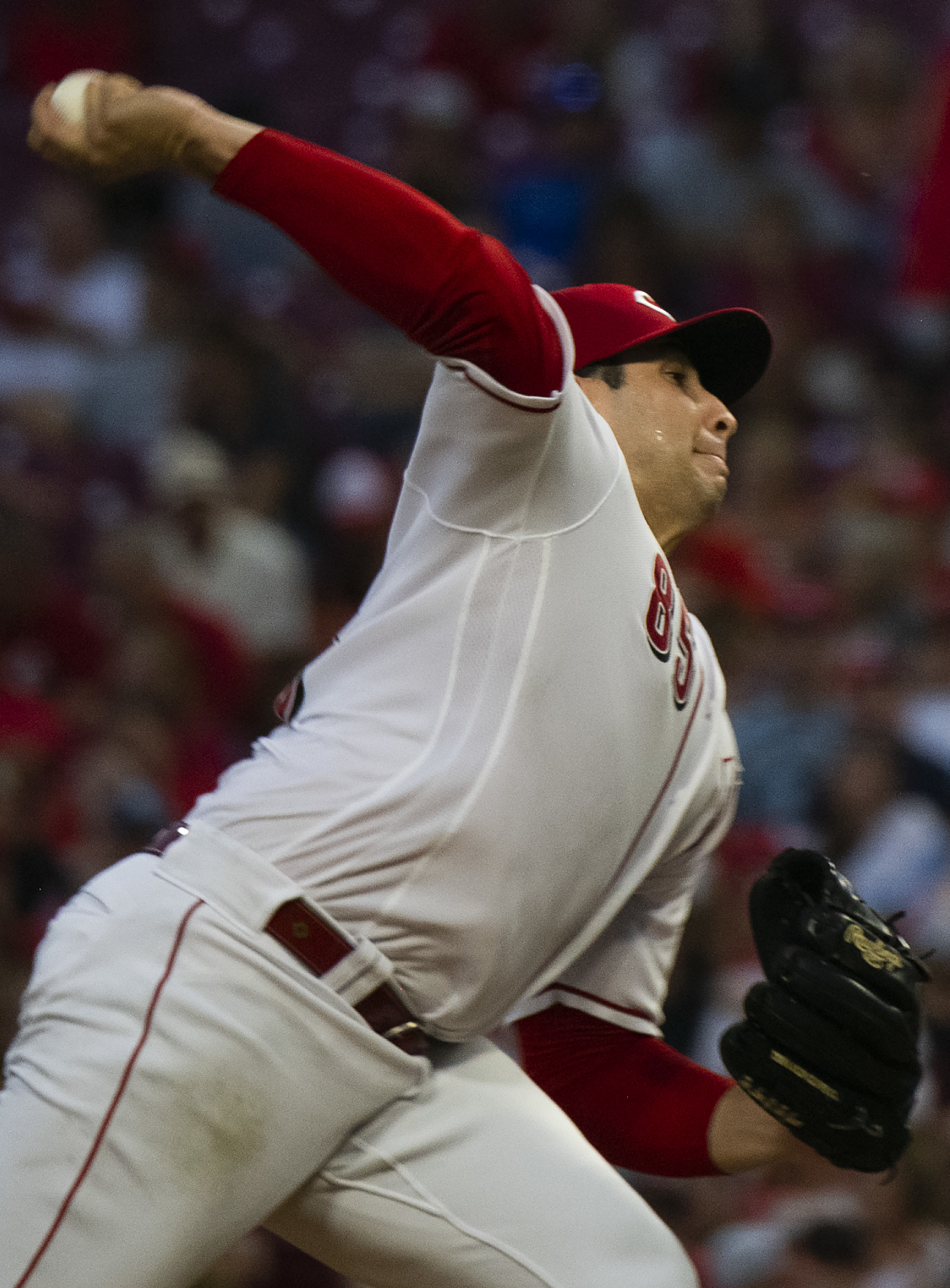
Cessa with the Reds in 2022

On July 28, 2021, the Yankees traded Cessa and Justin Wilson to the Cincinnati Reds for Jason Parker. In 24 appearances for the Reds, Cessa went 2–1 with a 2.05 ERA and 23 strikeouts.

On March 22, 2022, Cessa signed a $1.8 million contract with the Reds, avoiding salary arbitration. He pitched in 46 games for the Reds in 2022, registering a 4–4 record and 4.57 ERA with 59 strikeouts in 80 2/3 innings pitched.

On April 16, 2023, Cessa started a game against the Philadelphia Phillies in which he allowed 11 runs on 14 hits and 3 walks in 3 innings. Nine of the runs came in the first inning, after Bryson Stott led off with a home run. In 7 appearances (6 starts) for Cincinnati in 2023, Cessa struggled to a 1–4 record and 9.00 ERA with 11 strikeouts in 26 innings pitched. On May 9, he was designated for assignment following the promotion of Ben Lively. He was released on May 14.

=== Colorado Rockies ===
On May 21, 2023, Cessa signed a minor league contract with the Colorado Rockies organization. In 6 starts for the Triple-A Albuquerque Isotopes, he struggled to an 8.44 ERA with 19 strikeouts in 21 1/3 innings pitched. On June 29, Cessa was released by the Rockies.

=== Washington Nationals ===
On July 6, 2023, Cessa signed a minor league contract with the Washington Nationals organization. In 16 appearances for the Triple-A Rochester Red Wings, he struggled to an 8.71 ERA with 23 strikeouts and 3 saves in 20 2/3 innings pitched. On August 30, Cessa was released by Washington.

=== Kansas City Royals ===
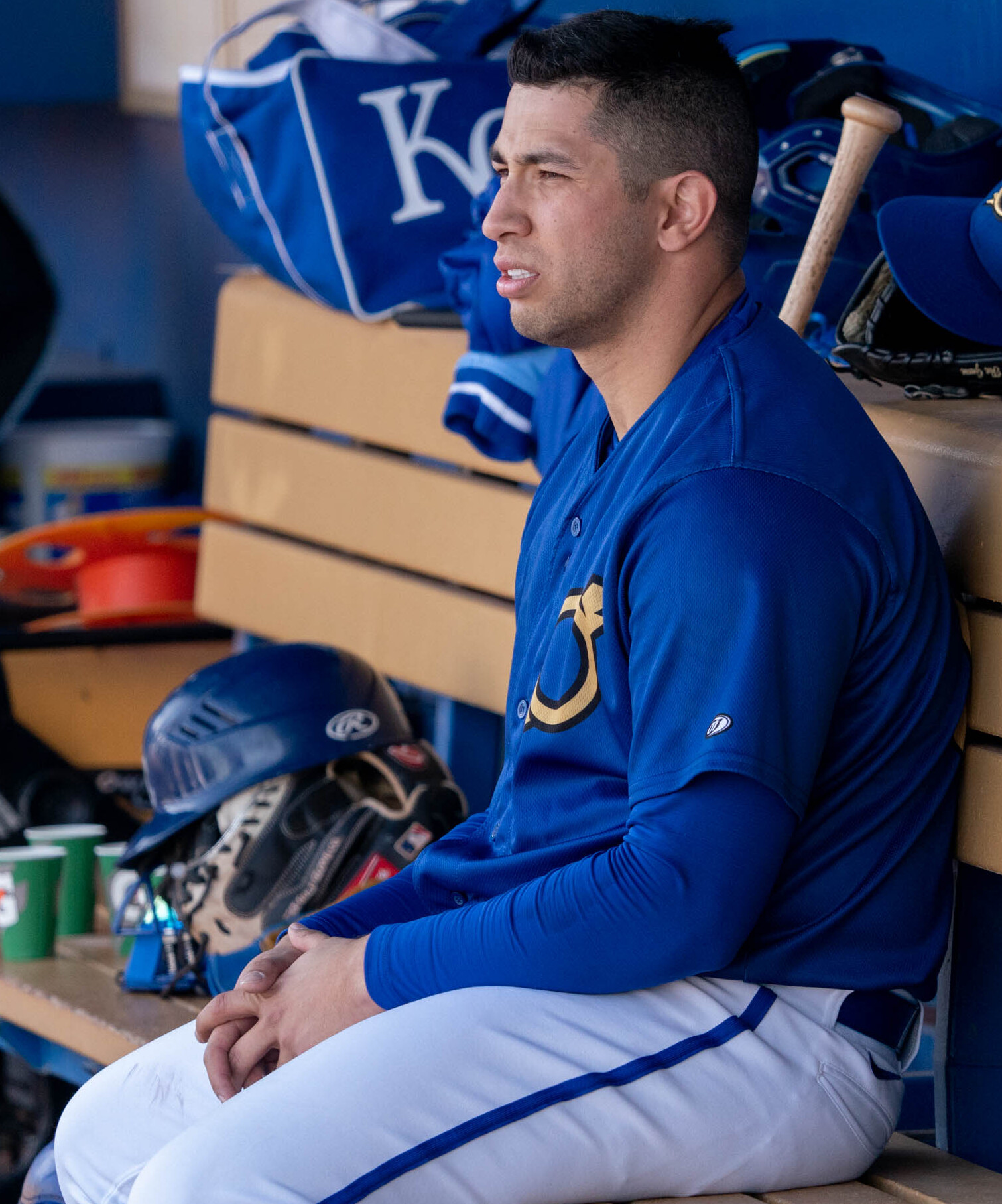
Cessa with the Storm Chasers in 2024

On November 18, 2023, Cessa signed a minor league contract with the Kansas City Royals. In 11 games (10 starts) for the Triple-A Omaha Storm Chasers, he compiled a 3.89 ERA with 29 strikeouts across 39 1/3 innings pitched. Cessa was released by the Royals on June 1.

=== Pittsburgh Pirates ===
On June 11, 2024, Cessa signed a minor league contract with the Pittsburgh Pirates. He made 15 appearances (13 starts) for the Triple-A Indianapolis Indians, posting a 2-5 record and 5.26 ERA with 48 strikeouts across 64 1/3 innings pitched. Cessa elected free agency following the season on November 4.

=== Sultanes de Monterrey ===
On February 24, 2025, Cessa signed with the Sultanes de Monterrey of the Mexican League. In 12 starts for Monterrey, Cessa compiled a 4-3 record and 4.83 ERA with 48 strikeouts across 54 innings pitched.

=== Olmecas de Tabasco ===
On December 18, 2025, Cessa was traded to the Olmecas de Tabasco of the Mexican League. In seven appearances (four starts) for the Olmecas, he posted a 0–1 record with a 8.40 ERA, nine strikeouts, and eight walks in 15 innings pitched. On June 13, 2026, Cessa was released by Tabasco.

== Personal life ==
Cessa was born in Córdoba, Veracruz and grew up in Cárdenas, Tabasco.
