= 2006 College Baseball All-America Team =

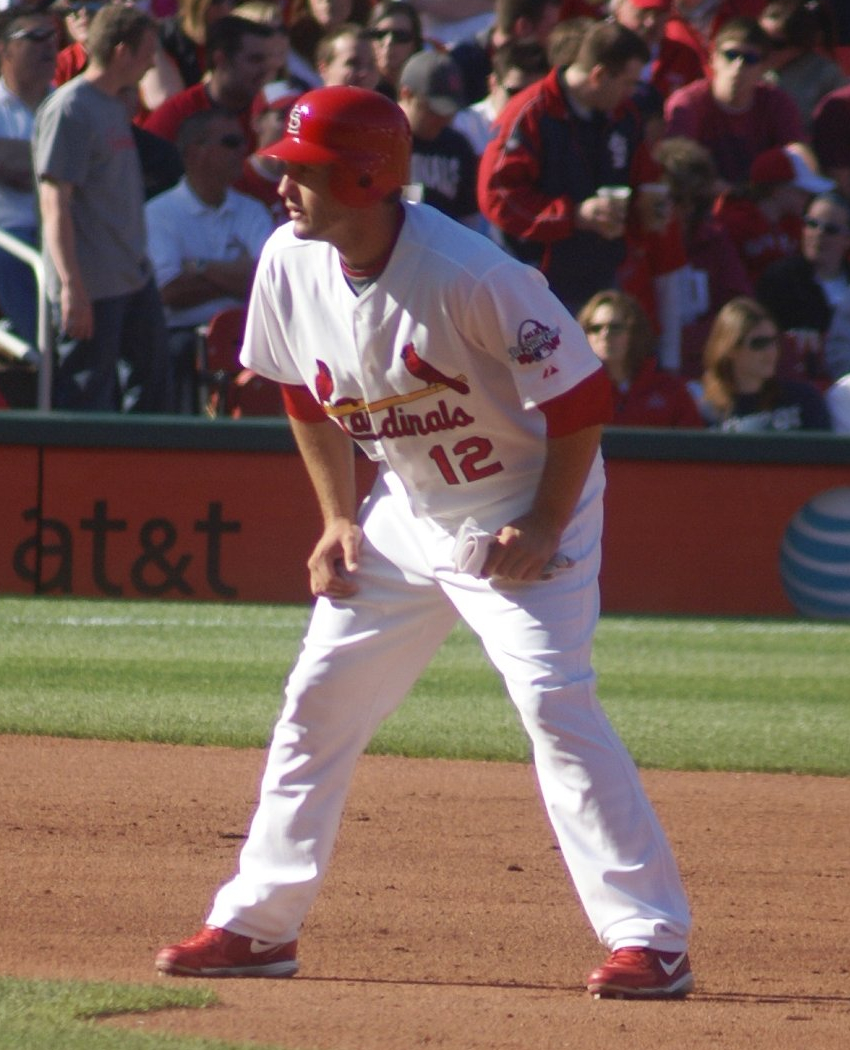
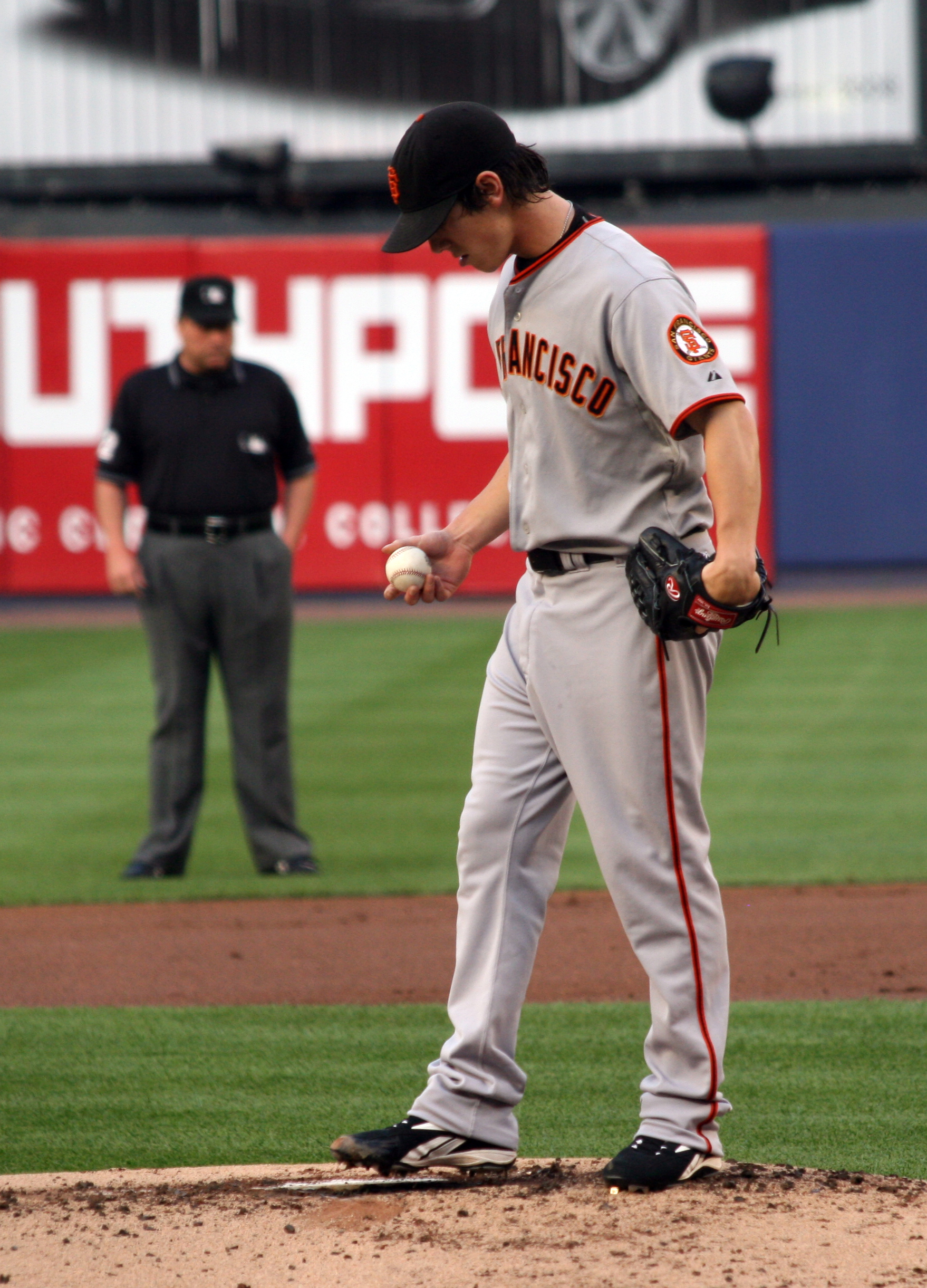
2006 All-Americans included 2011 World Series MVP David Freese (left) and 2× Cy Young Award winner Tim Lincecum (right).

This is a list of college baseball players named first team All-Americans for the 2006 NCAA Division I baseball season. From 2006 to 2010, there were five generally recognized All-America selectors for baseball: the American Baseball Coaches Association, Baseball America, Collegiate Baseball Newspaper, the National Collegiate Baseball Writers Association, and Rivals.com. In order to be considered a "consensus" All-American, a player must have been selected by at least three of these.

== Key ==
A	American Baseball Coaches Association
B	Baseball America
C	Collegiate Baseball Newspaper
N	National Collegiate Baseball Writers Association
R	Rivals.com
	Member of the National College Baseball Hall of Fame
	Consensus All-American – selected by all five organizations
	Consensus All-American – selected by three or four organizations

== All-Americans ==
Position	Name	School	#	A	B	C	N	R	Other awards and honors
Starting pitcher	Eddie Degerman	Rice	5	✓	✓	✓	✓	✓	
Starting pitcher	Wade LeBlanc	Alabama	1	—	—	✓	—	—	
Starting pitcher	Tim Lincecum	Washington	4	—	✓	✓	✓	✓	Golden Spikes Award
Starting pitcher	Andrew Miller	North Carolina	5	✓	✓	✓	✓	✓	Baseball America Player of the Year Roger Clemens Award
Starting pitcher	Wes Roemer	Cal State Fullerton	5	✓	✓	✓	✓	✓	Collegiate Baseball Player of the Year
Starting pitcher	Nick Schmidt	Arkansas	1	—	—	✓	—	—	
Relief pitcher	Don Czyz	Kansas	4	✓	—	✓	✓	✓	Stopper of the Year
Relief pitcher	Cole St. Clair	Rice	3	—	✓	—	✓	✓	
Catcher	Matt McBride	Lehigh	1	—	—	✓	—	—	
Catcher	Michael McKenry	Middle Tennessee	2	✓	—	—	✓	—	
Catcher	Matt Wieters	Georgia Tech	2	—	✓	—	—	✓	
First baseman	Andy D'Alessio	Clemson	1	—	—	—	✓	—	
First baseman / DH	Mark Hamilton	Tulane	2	—	✓	—	—	✓	
First baseman / DH	Ryan Strieby	Kentucky	4	✓	✓	✓	—	✓	
Second baseman	Jim Negrych	Pittsburgh	3	—	✓	—	✓	✓	
Second baseman	Drew Saylor	Kent State	1	—	—	✓	—	—	
Second baseman	Justin Turner	Cal State Fullerton	1	✓	—	—	—	—	
Shortstop	Brian Friday	Rice	1	—	✓	—	—	—	
Shortstop	Josh Horton	North Carolina	1	—	—	—	—	✓	
Shortstop	Ryan Khoury	Utah	1	✓	—	—	—	—	
Shortstop	Tom King	Troy	2	—	—	✓	✓	—	
Third baseman	Pedro Alvarez	Vanderbilt	2	—	✓	—	—	✓	
Third baseman	Ronnie Bourquin	Ohio State	1	—	—	—	✓	—	
Third baseman	David Freese	South Alabama	1	✓	—	—	—	—	
Third baseman	Tyler Mach	Oklahoma State	1	—	—	✓	—	—	
Outfielder	Tyler Colvin	Clemson	2	—	✓	—	✓	—	
Outfielder	Jacob Dempsey	Winthrop	3	✓	—	—	✓	✓	
Outfielder	Cole Gillespie	Oregon State	4	✓	✓	✓	—	✓	
Outfielder	Mike Goetz	Milwaukee	1	✓	—	—	—	—	
Outfielder	Drew Holder	Dallas Baptist	1	—	—	✓	—	—	
Outfielder	Kellen Kulbacki	James Madison	5	✓	✓	✓	✓	✓	Collegiate Baseball Player of the Year
Designated hitter	Chris Carlson	New Mexico	2	✓	—	✓	—	—	
Utility player	Brad Lincoln	Houston	5	✓	✓	✓	✓	✓	Dick Howser Trophy ABCA Player of the Year Brooks Wallace Award

== See also ==
- List of college baseball awards
