= Lloyd Peever =

American baseball player (born 1971)

- Pitcher

Lloyd Charles Peever (born September 15, 1971) is an American former baseball pitcher known primarily for his athletic exploits at Louisiana State University. He also played professionally, but never reached the major leagues. He peaked at Triple-A, the level directly below the majors.

He was born in Livermore, California and attended Ada High School in Ada, Oklahoma. During his senior year with the school, he won 18 games and had 189 strikeouts to earn All-State honors. Prior to attending LSU, he attended Seminole State College in 1990 and 1991. For 1992, he transferred to LSU and posted a 14–0 win–loss record, a 1.98 ERA, three complete games and a shutout in 17 appearances (15 starts). In 104.2 innings, he allowed only 67 hits and 20 walks, while striking out 116 batters. His campaign, dubbed "one of the best individual seasons ever in college baseball," earned him numerous honors and considerable recognition. He was named Collegiate Baseball Player of the Year by Collegiate Baseball Newspaper, earned All-American selections by the American Baseball Coaches Association and Baseball America, was voted first team all-Southeastern Conference, earned a selection to the SEC all-tournament team and was twice named National Player of the Week. He was also a Golden Spikes Award finalist.

He was drafted by the Colorado Rockies in the fourth round of the 1992 Major League Baseball draft, a few picks after third baseman Tom Evans. He initially ascended through their system one level at a time, starting with the Low-A Bend Rockies (3-2 W-L, 2.91 ERA) in 1992, then the high-A Central Valley Rockies (2-4, 4.18) in 1993, then the Double-A New Haven Ravens (9-8, 3.43) in 1994 and then the Triple-A Colorado Springs Sky Sox (3-2, 5.36) in 1995. After missing 1996, he returned to go 5–5 with a 5.21 ERA between the Salem Avalanche and New Haven to conclude his career. Overall, he was 22–21 with a 4.13 ERA in 82 games (55 starts). He is one of the few College Players of the Year to not eventually reach the majors: He was the first since Marteese Robinson, who won the award in 1987, and the last until Kellen Kulbacki and Wes Roemer, who co-won the award in 2006.

He was elected to LSU's Athletic Hall of Fame in 2011. He has also been a candidate for the National College Baseball Hall of Fame.

He later worked for GlaxoSmithKline.
