= Kevin Heijstek =

Dutch baseball player (born 1988)

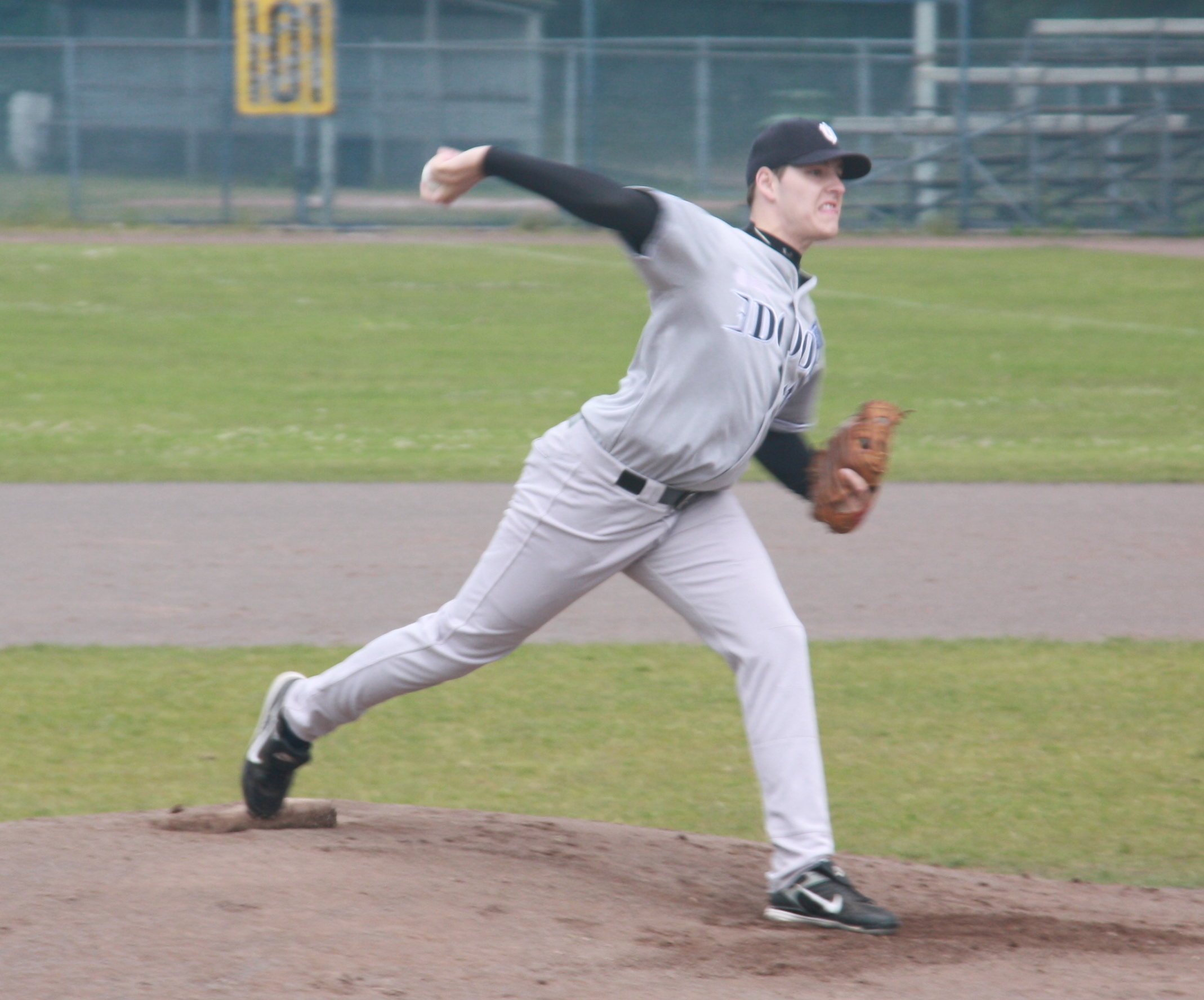
- Heijstek with Neptunus in 2009
- Pitcher
- Born: April 19, 1988 (age 38); Dordrecht, South Holland, Netherlands
- Bats: Right Throws: Right
- Stats at Baseball Reference
Medals
Men's baseball
Representing Netherlands
European Baseball Championship
Gold medal – first place	2014 Brno	National team
Silver medal – second place	2010 Germany	National team
France International Baseball Tournament
Gold medal – first place	2014 Sénart	National team

Kevin Heijstek (born April 19, 1988) is a Dutch former baseball player who pitched for the Netherlands national team in the 2013 World Baseball Classic (WBC) and other international tournaments. He also pitched in the Honkbal Hoofdklasse for Neptunus from 2005 to 2012, then Amsterdam Pirates from 2013 to 2019. He was named the best pitcher in the Dutch league in 2014.

== International career ==
In the 2013 WBC, Heijstek pitched in two games as a reliever, allowing two earned runs in 5 1/3 innings pitched. Heijstek was named to the Dutch roster for the 2017 WBC, but he did not pitch in the tournament due to a leg injury.

Heijstek won the Roel de Mon Award as the best Netherlands youth pitcher in 2004 and 2005. He pitched for the Dutch youth team in the 2006 World Junior Baseball Championship.

Heijstek made his debut for the Dutch national team in the 2009 World Port Tournament, posting a 17.18 earned run average (ERA). He also pitched in the 2010 Intercontinental Cup, 2014 France International Baseball Tournament, 2010 and 2014 European Baseball Championships, 2015 WBSC Premier12, and 2018 Haarlem Baseball Week.

== Honkbal Hoofdklasse ==
Heijstek began playing baseball in Zwijndrecht, later playing for the Unicorns youth team before moving to the second team of Neptunus in 2004. He debuted with Neptunus in the Hoofdklasse as a 17-year-old, pitching once in the top Dutch league that season. He led Neptunus with a 1.48 ERA in 2008. He threw three shutouts in 2009.

Heijstek moved to Amsterdam for the 2013 season. He was named the best pitcher in the Hoofdklasse in 2014. As the Pirates' ace, he suffered a torn left hamstring during the 2016 European Champions Cup in June, which ended his season and kept him out of the 2017 WBC. In 2017, he went 8–0 with a 1.26 ERA and was again one of the top pitchers in the league. He retired after the 2019 season.
