= 2016 European Champions Cup (baseball) =

Tournament details
- Countries: Italy; San Marino
- Dates: May 31 – June 4
- Teams: 8
- Defending champions: (Netherlands) Curaçao Neptunus

Final positions
- Champions: (Netherlands) L&D Amsterdam (1st title)
- Runners-up: (Italy) A.S.D. Rimini

Tournament statistics
- Games played: 19
- Attendance: 4,900 (258 per game)

The 2016 European Champions Cup was a European baseball competition, held from May 31, to June 4, 2016. This was the fifty-forth iteration of the Cup since its inaugural tournament in 1963. The champions were Dutch team L&D Amsterdam, winning the team's first title.

== List of competing teams ==
(Italy) A.S.D. Rimini (1st)	(Italy) Fortitudo Bologna (2nd)
(Netherlands) Curaçao Neptunus (1st)	(Netherlands) L&D Amsterdam (2nd)
(Germany) Heidenheim Heideköpfe (1st)	(Germany) Buchbinder Legionäre (2nd)
T&A San Marino	(Czech Republic) Kotlářka Praha

== Venues ==
Group B & Final Four	Group A & Bottom Four
Rimini, Italy	San Marino
Stadio dei Pirati	Stadio di Baseball di Serravalle

== First round ==
Qualified for Final Four
Qualified for Bottom Four

=== Group A ===
Rk	Team	W	L	Pct.	GB
1	(Italy) Fortitudo Bologna	3	0	1.000	0
2	(Netherlands) Curaçao Neptunus	2	1	.667	1
3	T&A San Marino	1	2	.333	2
4	(Germany) Heidenheim Heideköpfe	0	3	.000	3

Date	Local time	Road team	Score	Home team	Inn.	Venue	Game duration	Attendance	Boxscore
May 31, 2016	14:30	Curaçao Neptunus (Netherlands)	14-9	(Germany) Heidenheim Heideköpfe		Stadio di Baseball di Serravalle	3:05	305	Boxscore
May 31, 2016	19:30	T&A San Marino	3-5	(Italy) Fortitudo Bologna		Stadio di Baseball di Serravalle	2:42	400	Boxscore
Jun 1, 2016	15:30	Fortitudo Bologna (Italy)	1-0	(Netherlands) Curaçao Neptunus		Stadio dei Pirati	2:50	120	Boxscore
Jun 1, 2016	19:30	Heidenheim Heideköpfe (Germany)	3–4	T&A San Marino	10	Stadio di Baseball di Serravalle	3:00	100	Boxscore
Jun 2, 2016	14:30	Heidenheim Heideköpfe (Germany)	1–2	(Italy) Fortitudo Bologna	6	Stadio di Baseball di Serravalle	1:51	250	Boxscore
Jun 2, 2016	21:20	T&A San Marino	4-5	(Netherlands) Curaçao Neptunus	10	Stadio di Baseball di Serravalle	2:09	120	Boxscore

=== Group B ===
Rk	Team	W	L	Pct.	GB
1	(Netherlands) L&D Amsterdam	3	0	1.000	0
2	(Italy) A.S.D. Rimini	2	1	.667	1
3	(Germany) Buchbinder Legionäre	1	2	.333	2
4	(Czech Republic) Kotlářka Praha	0	3	.000	3

Date	Local time	Road team	Score	Home team	Inn.	Venue	Game duration	Attendance	Boxscore
May 31, 2016	15:30	Buchbinder Legionäre (Germany)	7-4	(Czech Republic) Kotlářka Praha		Stadio dei Pirati	2:32	50	Boxscore
May 31, 2016	20:30	L&D Amsterdam (Netherlands)	6-2	(Italy) A.S.D. Rimini		Stadio dei Pirati	3:21	800	Boxscore
Jun 1, 2016	17:10	Kotlářka Praha (Czech Republic)	2-10	(Netherlands) L&D Amsterdam		Stadio di Baseball di Serravalle	3:00	300	Boxscore
Jun 1, 2016	20:30	A.S.D. Rimini (Italy)	5–3	(Germany) Buchbinder Legionäre		Stadio dei Pirati	2:55	150	Boxscore
Jun 2, 2016	15:30	Buchbinder Legionäre (Germany)	0–1	(Netherlands) L&D Amsterdam		Stadio dei Pirati	2:10	81	Boxscore
Jun 2, 2016	19:30	A.S.D. Rimini (Italy)	4-0	(Czech Republic) Kotlářka Praha		Stadio dei Pirati	2:47	300	Boxscore

== Final four ==
Semi-Final 1

June 3 14:30 at Stadio dei Pirati
Team	1	2	3	4	5	6	7	8	9	R	H	E
(Netherlands) Curaçao Neptunus	0	0	0	4	0	1	0	0	2	7	7	2
(Netherlands) L&D Amsterdam	1	0	1	0	1	1	2	5	X	11	16	1
WP: (Netherlands) Kyle Ward (AMS) LP: (Netherlands) Bayron Cornelisse (NEP) Sv: (Netherlands) Tom de Blok (AMS); Home runs: NEP: (Netherlands) Janison Boekhoudt; AMS: (Netherlands) Linoy Croes; Attendance: 200; Umpires: HP − (Italy) Fabrizio Fabrizi, 1B − (Italy) Michele De Notta, 3B − (Austria) Oswald Tscharf; Boxscore

Semi-Final 2

June 3 20:30 at Stadio dei Pirati
Team	1	2	3	4	5	6	7	8	9	R	H	E
(Italy) A.S.D. Rimini	1	0	2	0	0	1	0	0	0	4	11	0
(Italy) Fortitudo Bologna	0	0	0	1	0	1	0	0	0	2	4	0
WP: (Venezuela) Ricardo Hernandez (RIM) LP: (Italy) Brent Buffa (BOL) Sv: (Italy) Carlos Teran (RIM); Attendance: 600; Umpires: HP − (Netherlands) Roy van de Wateringen, 1B − (Austria) Oswald Tscharf, 3B − (Spain) Jerónimo Moreno Saura; Boxscore

3rd Place

June 4 14:30 at Stadio dei Pirati
Team	1	2	3	4	5	6	7	8	9	R	H	E
(Netherlands) Curaçao Neptunus	0	0	0	0	0	3	0	0	3	6	9	2
(Italy) Fortitudo Bologna	4	0	0	0	0	0	0	2	1	7	9	3
WP: (Italy) Brent Buffa (NEP) LP: (Netherlands) Steven van Groningen (NEP) Sv: None; Attendance: 25; Umpires: HP − (Austria) Oswald Tscharf, 1B − (Spain) Jerónimo Moreno Saura, 3B − (Germany) Tim Meyer; Boxscore

Grand Final

June 4 20:30 at Stadio dei Pirati
Team	1	2	3	4	5	6	7	8	9	10	R	H	E
(Netherlands) L&D Amsterdam	0	0	0	0	3	0	0	0	0	2	5	9	1
(Italy) A.S.D. Rimini	0	0	0	1	0	0	0	2	0	1	4	7	1
WP: (Netherlands) Tom de Blok (AMS) LP: (Italy) Roberto Corradini (RIM) Sv: None; Attendance: 900; Umpires: HP − (Slovakia) Mojmir Jankovic, 1B − (Germany) Jens Waider, 3B − (Czech Republic) David Kulhánek; Boxscore

== Bottom Four ==
Game 1

June 3 15:30 at Stadio di Baseball di Serravalle
Team	1	2	3	4	5	6	7	8	9	R	H	E
(Germany) Heidenheim Heideköpfe	2	0	0	0	0	0	0	0	0	2	7	0
(Germany) Buchbinder Legionäre	0	0	0	0	0	0	0	0	0	0	7	0
WP: (United States) Wes Roemer (HEI) LP: (Germany) Niklas Rimmel (LEG) Sv: None; Attendance: 60; Umpires: HP − (Czech Republic) David Kulhánek, 1B − (Slovakia) Mojmir Jankovic, 3B − (Netherlands) Winfried Berkvens; Boxscore

Game 2

June 4 11:00 at Stadio di Baseball di Serravalle
Team	1	2	3	4	5	6	7	8	9	R	H	E
(Czech Republic) Kotlářka Praha	0	0	1	1	4	0	0	0	0	6	9	3
T&A San Marino	0	1	0	4	2	0	2	0	X	10	12	1
WP: (Venezuela) Carlos Quevedo (SMR) LP: (Czech Republic) Matej Sucha (PRA) Sv: None; Home runs: PRA: (Australia) Mitch Nilsson, (Czech Republic) Matej Sucha; SMR: None; Attendance: 50; Umpires: HP − (Germany) Jens Waider, 1B − (Netherlands) Roy van de Wateringen, 3B − (Netherlands) Winfried Berkvens; Boxscore

Relegation Game

June 4 15:30 at Stadio di Baseball di Serravalle
Team	1	2	3	4	5	6	7	8	9	R	H	E
(Czech Republic) Kotlářka Praha	1	0	0	0	1	0	0	0	0	2	7	3
(Germany) Buchbinder Legionäre	0	1	0	0	6	0	0	0	X	7	14	2
WP: (Netherlands) Mike Bolsenbroek (LEG) LP: (Czech Republic) Marek Minarik (PRA) Sv: None; Attendance: 70; Umpires: HP − (Italy) Michele De Notta, 1B − (Netherlands) Winfried Berkvens, 3B − (Italy) Fabrizio Fabrizi; Boxscore

== Final standings ==
Champion
Relegated to CEB Cup

Rk	Team
1	(Netherlands) L&D Amsterdam
2	(Italy) A.S.D. Rimini
3	(Italy) Fortitudo Bologna
4	(Netherlands) Curaçao Neptunus
5^{*}	T&A San Marino
5^{*}	(Germany) Heidenheim Heideköpfe
7	(Germany) Buchbinder Legionäre
8	(Czech Republic) Kotlářka Praha

^{*} Both teams share 5th place.

== Statistics leaders ==
=== Batting ===
Statistic	Name	Total/Avg
Batting average	(Netherlands) Nick Urbanus (AMS)	.571
Hits	(Netherlands) Nick Urbanus (AMS)	8
Runs	(Netherlands) Nick Urbanus (AMS)	10
Home runs	(Netherlands) Janison Boekhoudt (NEP)	2
RBI	(Netherlands) Janison Boekhoudt (NEP)	8
Walks	(Venezuela) Jose Flores (RIM)	6
Stolen bases	(Netherlands) Gilmer Lampe (AMS) (Italy) Mirco Caradonna (RIM)	3
On-base percentage	(Netherlands) Nick Urbanus (AMS)	.647
Slugging percentage	(Netherlands) Nick Urbanus (AMS)	.929
OBPS	(Netherlands) Nick Urbanus (AMS)	1.576

=== Pitching ===
Statistic	Name	Total/Avg
Wins	16 players	1
Losses	16 players	2
Saves	(Netherlands) Tom de Blok (AMS) (Italy) Carlos Teran (RIM)	2
Innings pitched	(Czech Republic) Marek Červenka (PRA)	12.1
Hits allowed	(Italy) Carlos Teran (RIM)	0
Runs allowed	(Italy) Carlos Teran (RIM)	0
Earned runs allowed	9 players	0
ERA	9 players	0.00
Walks	(Netherlands) Loek van Mil (NEP) (Italy) Roberto Corradini (RIM)	0
Strikeouts/Game	(Venezuela) Yoimer Camacho (SMR)	15.43

== See also ==
- European Baseball Championship
- Asia Series
- Caribbean Series
- Baseball awards § Europe
