= Marteese Robinson =

American baseball player

Marteese Robinson (born April 17, 1966) is a former college baseball player who played professionally, but never reached the major leagues.

Robinson attended Seton Hall Prep and then Seton Hall University. He hit .394/.453/.596 with the club in 1985 and .529/.564/.857 with 16 home runs and 90 RBI, 89 runs and 58 stolen bases in 55 games for the college team in 1987. He was the top hitter in NCAA Division I baseball that season, putting forth "one of the finest individual seasons in college baseball history." His .529 mark at the time was the second-highest in NCAA history, trailing Keith Hagman's .551 in 1980. With Robin Ventura, he won the Collegiate Baseball Newspaper Collegiate Baseball Player of the Year honor. He also earned a consensus All-American selection at first base and was named Big East Conference Player of the Year. After the 1987 season, he played collegiate summer baseball with the Cotuit Kettleers of the Cape Cod Baseball League.

He was drafted by the Oakland Athletics in the sixth round of the 1987 Major League Baseball draft, between infielders Dave Hollins and Greg Colbrunn, and began his professional career that year. He played in their organization until 1990, though never reached above Double-A. In 388 career games, he hit .266 with 24 home runs and 39 stolen bases. He was the first Collegiate Baseball Player of the Year to not reach the majors and the last until Lloyd Peever, who earned the honor in 1992.

He was profiled extensively in the 2002 book The Hit Men and the Kid Who Batted Ninth: Biggio, Valentin, Vaughn & Robinson: Together Again in the Big Leagues by David Siroty.

He later worked as a scout for the St. Louis Cardinals, Washington Nationals and Toronto Blue Jays.
