= Kotlářka Praha =

Baseball team in Prague, Czech Republic

Logo	Cap insignia

Information
- League: Czech Extraliga
- Location: Prague, Czech Republic
- Ballpark: Stadion Markéta
- Established: 1980; 46 years ago
- League championships: 1 (2015)
- Colors: Blue, red and white
- Manager: Jakub Vančura

Current uniforms
Home	Away

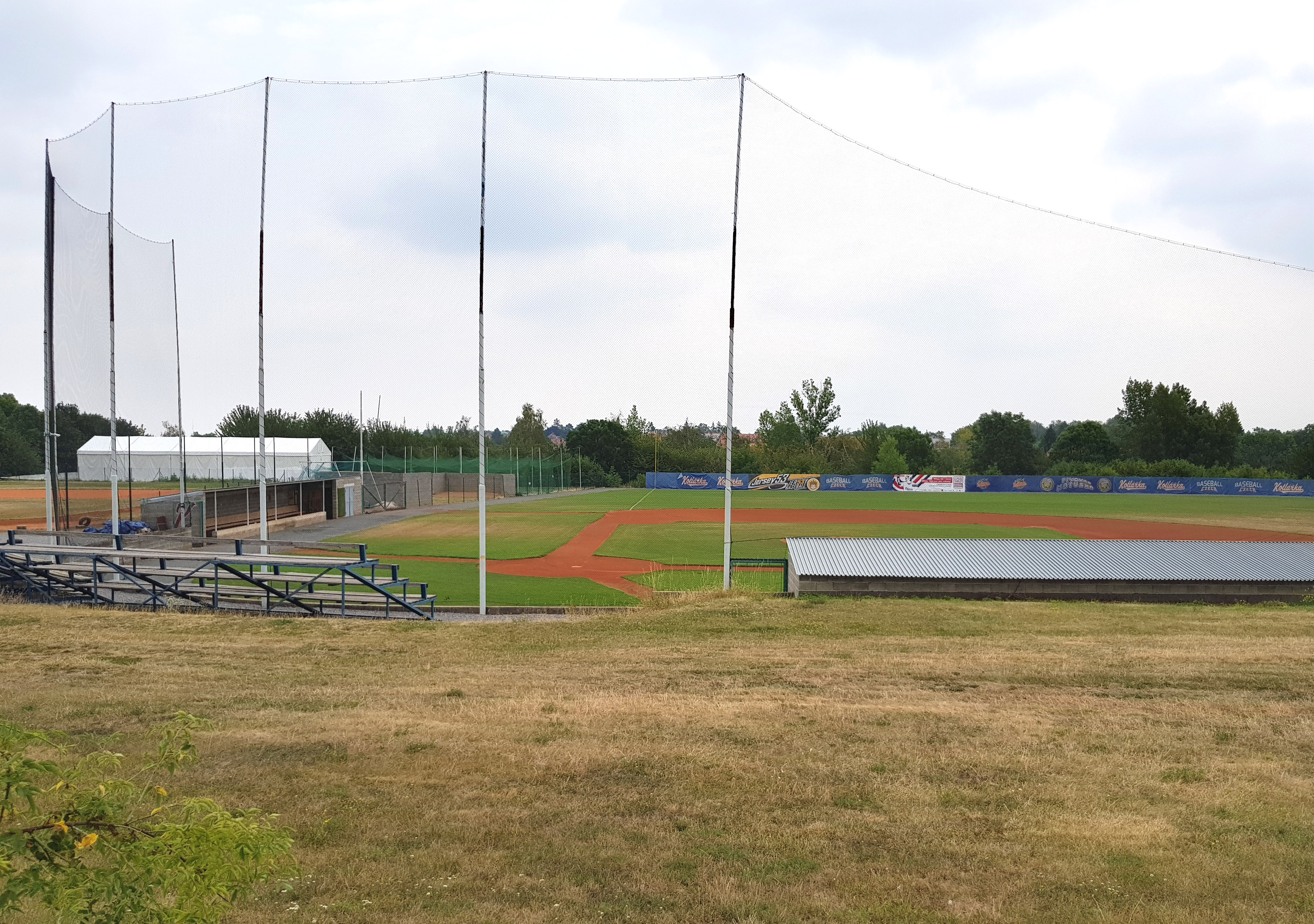
Kotlářka Praha's stadium, Stadion Markéta

Kotlářka Praha is a baseball team based in Prague, Czech Republic. The club competes in the Czech Extraliga, the highest level of baseball in the country, and won the championship in 2015, becoming the only Prague-based club to achieve this.

== History ==
The team was established as the baseball section of the Kotlářka sports club (Sportovní klub Kotlářka) in 1980. From its inception until 2006, the club only fielded youth teams, as it lacked a proper baseball field. After 2006, Kotlářka began construction of a baseball stadium in Dejvice, Stadion Markéta, which was completed in time for the 2008 season.

Kotlářka's senior team made its debut in 2008. In 2009, they were runners-up of the Czech Baseball 1. Liga, the second level of the Czech baseball system, earning promotion to the Extraliga, in which they debuted in 2010. In their first Extraliga season, they finished fourth with a 14–14 record but were eliminated in the quarterfinals by Eagles Praha.

In 2013, Kotlářka were runners-up in the Extraliga, losing the finals three games to one to Draci Brno. This qualified them for the 2014 European Champions Cup in Hoofddorp, Netherlands, where they finished seventh with a 1–4 record, achieving their only win in the tournament against the Solingen Alligators.

In 2014, Kotlářka again reached the finals, where they lost to Draci Brno, two games to three, in a repetition of the 2013 final. In 2015, the club won the Czech championship, defeating Draci Brno three games to two in their third consecutive final series meeting. As Czech champions, Kotlářka participated in the 2016 European Champions Cup, contested in Rimini and San Marino, where they finished last with a 0–3 record.

After the 2021 season, the Czech Extraliga was reduced from ten teams to eight, with Kotlářka being demoted to the second league. They returned to the Extraliga in 2024.

Six Kotlářka players were called to represent the Czech Republic at the 2026 World Baseball Classic: pitchers Lukáš Ercoli, Marek Minařík, Jan Novák and Daniel Padyšák, catcher Martin Červenka, and outfielder Max Prejda.

== Roster ==
Kotlářka Praha roster
Players		Coaches
Pitchers: 27 (Czech Republic) Štěpán Dupal; 63 (Czech Republic) Lukáš Ercoli; 44 (Czech Republic) Matyáš Fous; 66 (Czech Republic) David Hanousek; 34 (Czech Republic) Vít Hrdlička; 10 (Czech Republic) Jan Komorous; 29 (Czech Republic) David Křeček; 37 (Czech Republic) Daniel Kyzlink; 79 (Czech Republic) Jan Lorenc; 18 (Czech Republic) Jan Novák; 42 (Czech Republic) Daniel Padyšák; 32 (Czech Republic) Tomáš Plachý; 49 (United States) Wes Roemer	Catchers: 13 (Czech Republic) Martin Červenka; 39 (Czech Republic) Šimon Drápela; 14 (Czech Republic) Kryštof Lukavský; 46 (Czech Republic) Jaroslav Moravec; 3 (Czech Republic) Denis Šmiřák; Infielders: 70 (Czech Republic) Nikolas Hluchý; 50 (Czech Republic) Viktor Hluchý; 6 (Sweden) Albin Käck; 11 (Czech Republic) Max Lukeš; 19 (Czech Republic) Benjamin Morgan; 15 (Czech Republic) Jáchym Puš; 25 (Czech Republic) Šimon Tuček; Outfielders: 48 (Czech Republic) Ondřej Blažka; 62 (Czech Republic) Tobiáš Güttler; 55 (Czech Republic) David Komorous; 88 (Czech Republic) Adam Matuška; 21 (Czech Republic) Max Prejda	Manager: (Czech Republic) Jakub Vančura; Roster updated on 7 April 2026

== Achievements ==
- Extraliga : 1 (2015)

== Season-by-season ==
Season	League	Regular season					Postseason			Ref.
Season	League	Finish	Wins	Losses	Pct.	GB	Wins	Losses	Result	Ref.
2008	1. Liga	3rd	11	5	.688	4.5	1	2	Lost first round (Hroši Brno)	
2009	1. Liga	1st	14	1	.933	–	4	2	Lost final series (Hroši Brno)	
2010	Extraliga	4th	14	14	.500	11.0	1	3	Lost quarter finals (Eagles Praha)	
2011	Extraliga	2nd	25	10	.714	3.0	1	3	Lost semifinals (Technika Brno)	
2012	Extraliga	4th	19	15	.559	5.5	1	3	Lost semifinals (Draci Brno)	
2013	Extraliga	2nd	27	8	.771	2.0	4	4	Lost final series (Draci Brno)	
2014	Extraliga	3rd	23	12	.657	1.0	5	3	Lost final series (Draci Brno)	
2015	Extraliga	2nd	23	12	.657	6.0	6	2	Won final series (Draci Brno)	
2016	Extraliga	2nd	26	8	.765	0.5	5	4	Lost final series (Draci Brno)	
2017	Extraliga	6th	17	19	.472	14.0	0	1	Lost semifinals (Arrows Ostrava)	
2018	Extraliga	4th	19	8	.704	7.0	Did not qualify			
2019	Extraliga	5th	16	11	.593	8.0	Did not qualify			
2020	Extraliga	3rd	12	16	.667	3.0	1	2	Lost semifinals (Arrows Ostrava)	
2021	Extraliga	8th	10	17	.370	11.0	Did not qualify			
2022	1. Liga	3rd	9	5	.643	4.0	0	2	Lost semifinals (Skokani Olomouc)	
2023	1. Liga	1st	12	2	.857	–	0	2	Lost semifinals (SaBaT Praha)	
2024	Extraliga	6th	11	24	.314	14.0	Did not qualify			
2025	Extraliga	7th	13	22	.371	11.0	Did not qualify			

== European Champions Cup record ==
Year	Venue	Finish	Wins	Losses	Win%	Manager
2014	(Netherlands) Hoofddorp	7th	1	4	.200	(Czech Republic) Filip Smola
2016	(Italy) Rimini / San Marino	8th	0	3	.000	(Czech Republic) Ondřej Chocholatý
Total			1	7	.125	
