= Andrew Miller (baseball) =

American baseball player (born 1985)

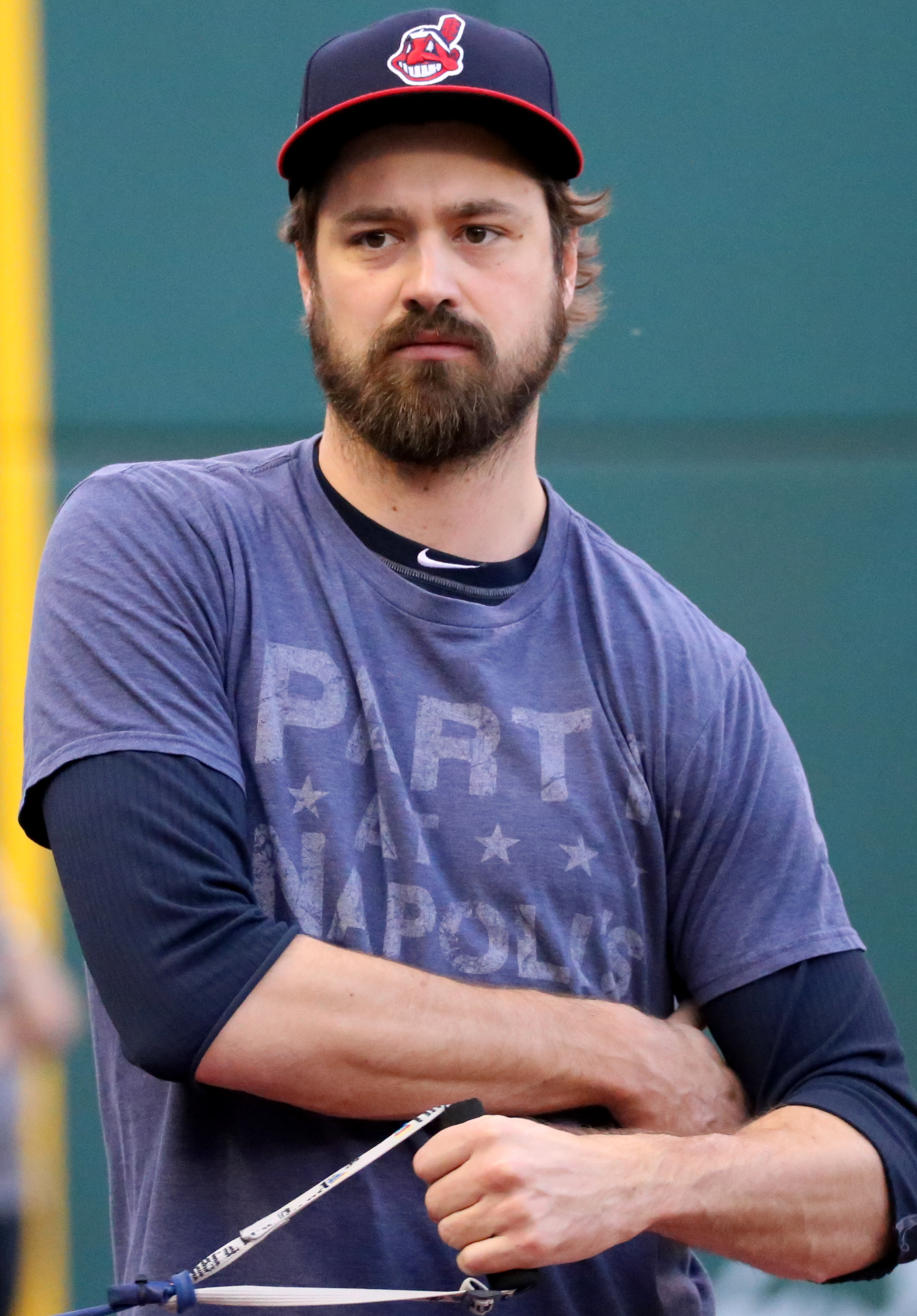
- Miller with the Cleveland Indians in 2016
- Pitcher
- Born: May 21, 1985 (age 41); Gainesville, Florida, U.S.
- Batted: Left Threw: Left

MLB debut
- August 30, 2006, for the Detroit Tigers

Last MLB appearance
- October 1, 2021, for the St. Louis Cardinals

MLB statistics
- Win–loss record: 55–55
- Earned run average: 4.03
- Strikeouts: 979
- Saves: 63
- Stats at Baseball Reference

Teams
- Detroit Tigers (2006–2007); Florida Marlins (2008–2010); Boston Red Sox (2011–2014); Baltimore Orioles (2014); New York Yankees (2015–2016); Cleveland Indians (2016–2018); St. Louis Cardinals (2019–2021)

Career highlights and awards
- 2× All-Star (2016, 2017); ALCS MVP (2016); AL Reliever of the Year (2015)
Medals
Men's baseball
Representing United States
World Baseball Classic
Gold medal – first place	2017 Los Angeles	Team

Andrew Mark Miller (born May 21, 1985) is an American former professional baseball pitcher. He played in Major League Baseball (MLB) for the Detroit Tigers, Florida Marlins, Boston Red Sox, Baltimore Orioles, New York Yankees, Cleveland Indians, and St. Louis Cardinals. Primarily a starting pitcher who struggled early in his MLB career, Miller found sustained success as a reliever utilizing a multi-faceted fastball and slider approach that proved deceptive for batters to hit. A left-handed batter and thrower, Miller stands 6 feet 7 inches (2.01 m) tall and weighs 205 pounds (93 kg). Internationally, Miller represented the United States. In the 2017 World Baseball Classic (WBC), he helped win Team USA's first gold medal in a WBC tournament.

Instrumental in the Indians' World Series run in 2016, Miller earned the American League (AL) Championship series Most Valuable Player (ALCS MVP) honors, while setting a number of postseason strikeout records for relievers and covering multiple relief roles and innings. He is also a two-time MLB All-Star selection, and a winner of the AL Reliever of the Year Award. In 2017, he earned his first major championship in the World Baseball Classic as a member of the United States national team. His collegiate baseball awards include the Baseball America College Player of the Year and Roger Clemens Awards.

A native of Gainesville, Florida, Miller attended the University of North Carolina (UNC) at Chapel Hill, playing for the UNC Tar Heels. The Detroit Tigers selected him sixth overall in the 2006 MLB draft, and he made his MLB debut that same season after three minor league appearances. After commencing his career in MLB with a 5.70 earned run average (ERA) over 66 starts with Detroit and Florida, he converted to full-time relief in 2012 with Boston, and remained in middle relief, setup and closer roles. The Red Sox traded Miller to the Orioles in 2014, and Miller signed as a free agent with the Yankees after the season. The Yankees traded Miller to the Indians during the 2016 season, and in 2019 he signed with the Cardinals. He pitched in the playoffs in seven consecutive seasons, with Baltimore, the New York Yankees, Cleveland and St. Louis.

== Early life ==
Andrew Mark Miller was born to David Miller, an accountant and real estate developer, and Kim Miller, a pediatric nurse practitioner, in Gainesville, Florida. His uncle, Dan Miller, is a former NFL and USFL placekicker who played college football at the University of Miami.

Miller pitched for, and graduated from, Buchholz High School in Gainesville. As a junior, he was a choice for third-team all-state. For his senior year, he was the Florida baseball Gatorade Player of the Year, a selection for both pre-season and post-season All-America honors and first-team all-state.

== Amateur career ==
=== University of North Carolina ===
After graduating from Buchholz, Miller attended the University of North Carolina (UNC) at Chapel Hill and majored in Business Administration. He pitched for the Tar Heels baseball team, a member of the Atlantic Coast Conference (ACC).

==== 2004–2005 ====
As a freshman in 2004, Miller made his college debut as a starting pitcher versus Gardner–Webb on February 25, recording six shutout innings pitched. He struggled with control early but was selected for the weekend rotation in the California series on March 14. On May 16, he struck out a season-best 11 batters while allowing three hits in eight shutout innings against then No. 2 Miami. His first career complete game was on May 28 against Duke in the ACC tournament, in which he gave up two runs and struck out seven.

In 15 starts and three relief appearances in 2004, Miller finished with a 6–3 win–loss record (W−L), 2.93 earned run average (ERA), 88 strikeouts in 89 innings, and a .202 batting average against (BAA). He led the ACC in batting average against, and was third in the conference in ERA and fifth with 8.90 strikeouts per 9 innings pitched (K/9). He led Tar Heel starters in ERA and led the club in strikeouts. He was named second-team All-ACC honors and to the Baseball America's All-Freshman second team.

Miller won his first seven decisions of 2005 while giving up three earned runs in his first seven starts. In his first three starts, all victories over Appalachian State, UNC Wilmington and Birmingham–Southern, he allowed only one earned run. He was selected as ACC Pitcher of the Week on February 28 and March 21. Miller struck out a career-high 12 batters in a no-decision against Arizona State on March 4. On two occasions, he carried no-hitters into the sixth inning, once each against Birmingham–Southern and Clemson. He tied an NCAA division I record by hitting seven batters against Virginia on April 1. Miller pitched in tournament losses both to Wake Forest at the ACC tournament and to Florida in the NCAA Regional in his hometown of Gainesville.

In 16 starts, Miller totaled 96 2/3 innings and posted an 8–4 record, 2.98 ERA, 104 strikeouts, .230 BAA, 9.68 K/9, 52 bases on balls and 19 hit batters. The strikeout total ranked as the seventh-highest in Tar Heel history and the most since 1995. He led the ACC in strikeouts per nine innings, was sixth in BAA and seventh in ERA. For the second consecutive season, Miller earned second-team All-ACC honors.

==== 2006 ====
As the Tar Heels' third starter on February 19, 2006, against Seton Hall, Miller logged six shutout innings with nine strikeouts, including reaching 200 for his career. He reached double-figure strikeouts totals in wins over George Washington on February 26 (11 strikeouts) and Purdue on March 5 (10 strikeouts). He struck out a career-high 13 batters in seven shutout innings versus the then No. 4 Georgia Tech on March 24, and earned ACC Pitcher of the Week honors for that week ending March 27. On March 31, he held No. 1 Florida State scoreless on four hits over seven innings, striking out nine. He was named ACC Pitcher of the Week for the second consecutive week on April 3.

In his win over Boston College on May 18, Miller gave up two hits over eight innings to become Carolina's first 11-game winner since 1995. He also struck out 11 Eagle batters to set the school career strikeout record and earned ACC Pitcher of the Week honors on May 22 for the third time of the season. In six regular starts against nationally ranked opponents, he was 5–1 with a 1.27 ERA. Miller was credited with an 8–1 W–L and 1.94 ERA in ACC regular season competition.

Appearing in his first College World Series tournament, Miller made his first tournament start against No. 2 Cal State Fullerton and struck out nine in 7 1/3 innings in a no-decision. His first career save was in the Tar Heels' second victory over the Titans. Miller achieved his first career postseason win after allowing four runs with six strikeouts in eight innings versus Winthrop on June 3. In the Tuscaloosa Super Regional victory on June 9 over No. 4 Alabama, he struck out 11, walked one, and allowed five hits and two unearned runs over seven innings.

The Tar Heels were runners-up to Oregon State for the three-game College World Series championship. Miller started Game 1, and allowed three runs and struck out five in five innings. In the final game of the three-game series, Miller relieved future Boston Red Sox teammate Daniel Bard with three runners on base, including the go-ahead and series-deciding run in Bill Rowe on third base. Miller induced the first batter he faced, pinch hitter Ryan Gipson, to hit a ground ball. Second baseman Bryan Steed fielded and threw wide of first baseman Tim Federowicz, allowing Rowe to score and giving Oregon State the title.

In his junior year in 2006, Miller allowed 12 extra base hits, while producing a 13−2 W−L with a 2.48 ERA, 133 strikeouts and a .222 BAA in 123 1/3 innings. He became the first Tar Heel to win 13 games since 1978. In five games, he struck out at least 10 batters.

A number of awards followed Miller's accomplishments in 2006, including Baseball America's College Player of the Year and the Roger Clemens Award winner as the nation's top collegiate pitcher. The ACC selected him as conference Pitcher of the Year. He was chosen to be on the rosters of All-America first teams by Collegiate Baseball, Baseball America, NCBWA and Rivals.com. Further, Miller was selected as a finalist in 2006 for the Golden Spikes Award by USA Baseball, won by Tim Lincecum.

==== Career accomplishments and honors ====
Miller set Carolina strikeout records for both single season (133 in 2006) and career (325). He also ranked third in Tar Heels' history with 27 wins and fourth in total innings pitched with 309. He reached double-figures in strikeouts in nine games in his career.

On January 30, 2016, UNC commemorated Miller's accomplishments during the half-time of a men's basketball game versus Boston College and retired his uniform number 33. He became the third Tar Heel baseball alumnus thusly recognized, following Dave Lemonds and B. J. Surhoff.

=== Chatham A's ===
In the summers of 2004 and 2005, Miller pitched for the Chatham A's in the Cape Cod Baseball League (CCBL). In a July 2004 game versus the Falmouth Commodores called by fog after four innings, he struck out 12 batters, including future Red Sox teammate Jacoby Ellsbury. With Miller's slider hitting the back foot of several hitters as they swung at strike three and missed, controversy arose as to whether they had been officially hit by the pitch or were out on strikes. However, the game's achievements were not counted as five innings would have had to have been completed for the game to be entered as an official record. Named to the CCBL All-Star Game that summer, Miller pitched one inning and struck out all three batters he faced. His season totals included 48 strikeouts in 40 innings, 2–0 W–L and a 2.03 ERA. Baseball America named him the league's number one Major League prospect.

In 2005, Miller posted a 1.65 ERA. Baseball America rated him the College Summer Player of the Year and the number one prospect in the CCBL in 2005. That year, he also won the Robert A. McNeece Award (outstanding professional prospect) and was a co-winner with Tim Norton of Falmouth and Uconn for the B.F.C. Whitehouse Outstanding Pitcher Award.

Overall with the A's, Miller won eight games without being defeated and struck out 114 batters in 89 innings. Once the compulsory five-year waiting period concluded, Miller was elected to the CCBL Hall of Fame in 2012. Former Chatham general manager Charlie Thoms presented him for enshrinement on November 10, 2012, at the Chatham Bars Inn.

== Professional career ==
=== Draft and minor leagues ===
Although Miller was considered a possible first overall selection in the 2006 MLB draft, the Kansas City Royals instead took Luke Hochevar, and the Detroit Tigers chose Miller sixth overall. They agreed to a contract with a guaranteed value of $5.45 million and a signing bonus of $3.55 million on August 4, 2006. He made his professional debut on August 20, 2006, with the Lakeland Tigers of the Class A-Advanced Florida State League. His stint with Lakeland lasted less than a week, as he pitched his third and final outing six days later. After five scoreless innings with nine strikeouts, Detroit called him up to the major leagues.

=== Detroit Tigers ===
Miller made his MLB debut on August 30, 2006, at Yankee Stadium against the New York Yankees, pitching one scoreless inning and allowing one baserunner, Craig Wilson, on a hit by pitch. In eight games, Miller posted a 0–1 record with a 6.10 ERA, walking ten batters in 9 1/3 innings, including seven of 16 left-handers faced. The Tigers advanced to the playoffs and did not include him on the roster. They lost to the St. Louis Cardinals in the 2006 World Series. Baseball America rated Miller's slider as the best in the Tigers organization and the franchise's second-best prospect overall.

While Miller did not make the Tigers' opening day roster in 2007, he made his first major league start May 18, 2007, versus the Cardinals. Starting in place of the injured Jeremy Bonderman, he completed six scoreless innings with four hits, three walks and two strikeouts, earning his first major league victory. Detroit optioned him back to the minors four days later with Bonderman recovered from injury. Miller played for Lakeland and the Erie SeaWolves of the Class AA Eastern League. With the SeaWolves, he started three games in May and yielded a 0.78 ERA in 23 IP.

The Tigers recalled Miller on June 10 when they sent Nate Robertson to the disabled list (DL) with arm fatigue, and Miller started that day. He was the winning pitcher by decision in a 15–7 victory over the New York Mets. His best game pitched of 2007 was a six-inning performance in Atlanta on June 24, allowing four hits and no runs while also striking out two batters and walking two ending in a 5–0 Tigers victory. In July, he compiled a 2–1 record, 3.71 ERA and 28 strikeouts over five starts and 26 1/3 IP, and was fifth in the American League with 9.45 K/9. He went on the DL on August 3 and was reinstated on August 24, as he produced a 0–1 record and 19.80 ERA, allowing 11 ER in five IP in two starts before being optioned to Lakeland on August 30. In 13 starts in 2007, Miller was credited with a 5–5 record and 5.63 ERA. He limited left-handed batters (LHB) to a .175 batting average, and right-handers (RHB) batted .312 against him, the ninth-highest average against in the American League.

=== Florida Marlins ===
On December 5, 2007, the Tigers traded Miller, Cameron Maybin, Mike Rabelo, Dallas Trahern, Eulogio de la Cruz and Burke Badenhop to the Florida Marlins for Dontrelle Willis and Miguel Cabrera. Miller started the season in the Marlins rotation. From April 23 to May 10, he established a new personal-best three game winning streak. In the month of May, he made five starts, going 3–2 with a 2.43 ERA. He made 20 starts through July 18 until landing on 15-day disabled list on July 18 with patellar tendinitis in the right knee. Through that point, he had posted a 5–9 record and 5.63 ERA in 100 2/3 innings.

Andrew played in six rehab games, going 1–1 with 2.33 ERA, before reinstatement from the DL on September 1, 2008. The Marlins moved him to the bullpen, and he went 1–1 with a 9.45 ERA in nine appearances and 6 2/3 innings. From June 22 to September 9, he lost four consecutive decisions, matching his personal high. Reaching new career-highs for a season, Miller appeared in 29 games, starting 20, and went 6–10 W–L with a 5.87 ERA and 89 strikeouts in 107 1/3 innings. He allowed a .226 average (21 hits in 93 at-bats) and three home runs to LHB, and a .321 average (99-for-322) and four home runs to RHB.

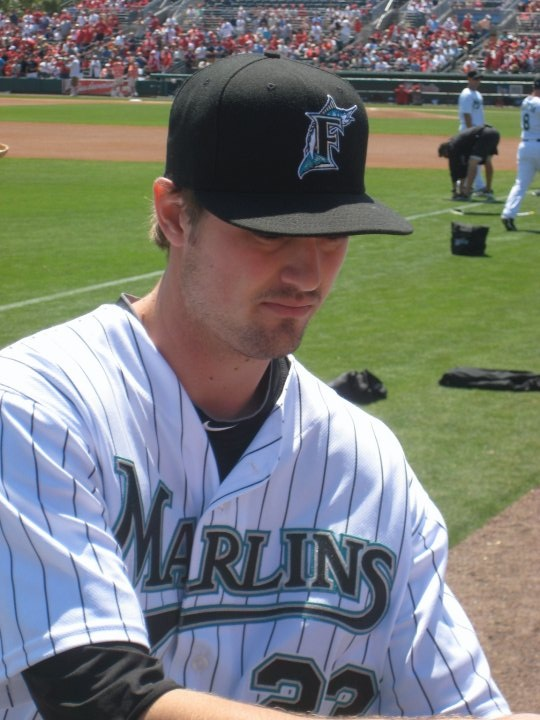
Miller at Florida Marlins spring training 2010

The Marlins initially assigned Miller to the bullpen in 2009 before inserting him into the starting rotation on April 15. He injured his oblique muscle on April 20. The club placed him on the disabled list and reactivated him on May 16. He completed a season-high seven innings and tied a career-best with nine strikeouts versus the Arizona Diamondbacks on May 21. Florida optioned him to the New Orleans Zephyrs on July 20, where he was 1–2 with a 5.79 ERA in 18.2 IP in five starts at the minor league level. He rolled his ankle during July 29 start at Nashville. He was recalled to the major leagues on September 6. He made 20 appearances in 2009, with 14 of them starts, going 3–5 with a 4.84 ERA.

During spring training in 2010, the Marlins announced that they would assign Miller to their Triple-A minor league team, New Orleans to open the season. He also pitched for the Double-A Jacksonville Suns, where he made 18 starts and completed 85 1/3 innings. His record was 1–8 record and ERA 6.01 as he allowed 57 earned runs and 61 walks with 66 strikeouts. The club recalled him to the major leagues on August 18. Miller finished the 2010 year 1–5 with an 8.54 ERA in nine games and seven starts.

=== Boston Red Sox ===
==== 2011–2012 ====
On November 12, 2010, the Marlins traded Miller to the Boston Red Sox for relief pitcher Dustin Richardson. Boston non-tendered him less than a month later. Manager Terry Francona estimated that he "must have made 15 calls that winter trying to get him to come to the Red Sox" after the club non-tendered him because he saw that flaws in his pitching mechanics could be easily corrected. Miller re-signed with Boston on December 16, 2010. During 2011 spring training, Boston optioned Miller to minor league camp and announced that he would begin the year as a starting pitcher with the Triple-A Pawtucket Red Sox.

On June 19, 2011, Boston purchased Miller's contract. The Red Sox won the first four games that he started, while he was credited as the winning pitcher in three of them. His first loss of the 2011 season came on July 15, as the Tampa Bay Rays hosted the Red Sox at Tropicana Field. Miller was pulled after 2 2/3 innings, having already given up seven runs on five hits, including a grand slam to Ben Zobrist. He finished the 2011 year 6–3 with a 5.54 ERA in 17 games and 12 starts.

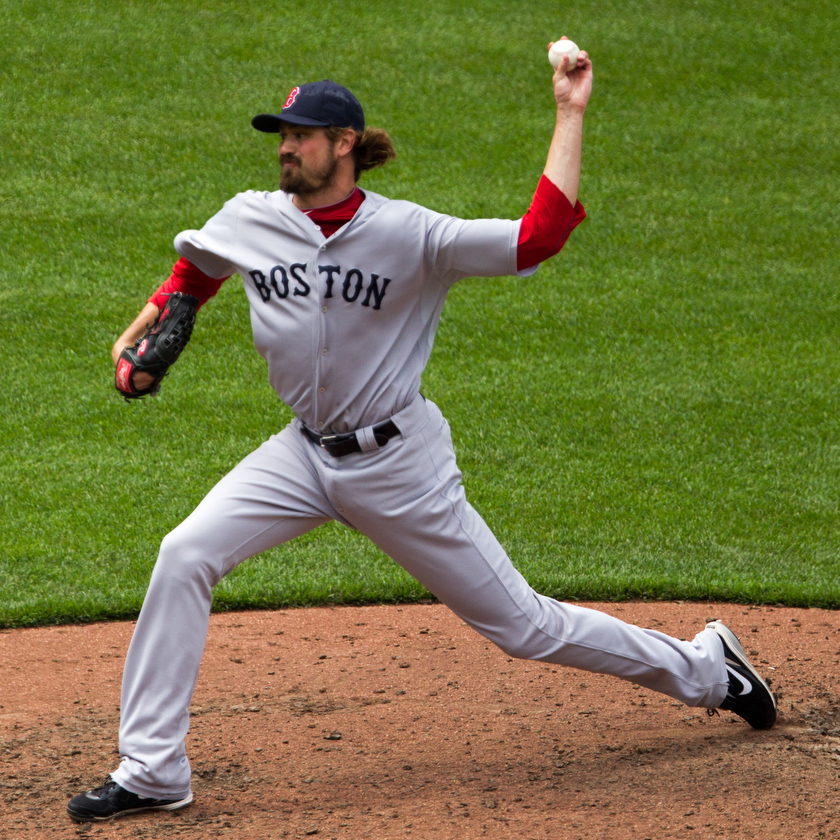
Miller pitching for the Boston Red Sox in 2012

Miller began the 2012 season in the minors while recovering from an injury. When he was called up to the majors, the Red Sox moved him to the bullpen, which became permanent after having posted a 5.70 ERA in 66 career starts. Miller limited left-handed batters (LHB) to a .149 average (13-for-87) in 2012, the second-lowest in the AL for all pitchers with a minimum of 100 batters faced, and the lowest average by a Red Sox left-handed pitcher since at least 1974. He allowed one extra-base hit to LHB over the season, on May 23, and afterward allowed 10 more hits to LHB. Of 46 runners inherited, he stranded 39 (84.8 percent), the fifth best in the AL, and the eighth-best ratio of Red Sox relievers since at least 1974 who had inherited 30 or more runners. He recorded a team-high 31 hitless appearances and produced 22 perfect outings.

Miller's 2012 totals included a 3–2 record and a 3.35 ERA in 53 appearances. His totals in games, ERA, holds (13), WHIP (1.19), opponent AVG (.194), walks per 9.0 innings (4.46), and K/9 (11.38) were all career-bests. The Boston BBWAA named Miller Red Sox Fireman of the Year in his first full season of relief pitching.

==== 2013–2014 ====
In a July 6, 2013, game against the Los Angeles Angels of Anaheim, Miller tripped and suffered a foot injury by while covering home plate after J. B. Shuck had hit a single. Podiatrist George Theodore found torn ligaments in the Lisfranc zone of his foot. As a result, Miller missed the remainder of the 2013 season. He had accumulated a 1–2 W–L with a 2.64 ERA and 48 strikeouts over 30 2/3 innings in 37 games. He averaged a career-best 2.82 strikeout-to-walk ratio (K/BB) and career-high 14.1 K/9, the second-highest ratio for all MLB relievers with at least 30 IP. Despite his year-ending absence, the Red Sox awarded Miller a championship ring after winning the World Series.

Miller reached new levels of success in 2014 with Boston. He was especially effective at home at Fenway Park, stranding 24 of 26 inherited runners (92.3%) and allowing one run in 26 games for a 0.39 ERA in 23 IP while limiting opponents to a .105 batting average and career-low .229 on-base percentage. His season totals with the Red Sox included 50 appearances with a 3–5 W–L, 2.34 ERA, 13 walks and 69 strikeouts in 42 1/3 innings.

=== Baltimore Orioles ===
On July 31, 2014, Boston traded Miller to the Baltimore Orioles for minor-league pitcher Eduardo Rodríguez. On September 7, 2014, Miller completed a scoreless 11th in a 7−5 victory over Tampa Bay for his first career save. The Orioles clinched their first American League East title in 17 years on September 16, 2014, in an 8−2 win over Toronto. He faced two batters in that game and struck both out.

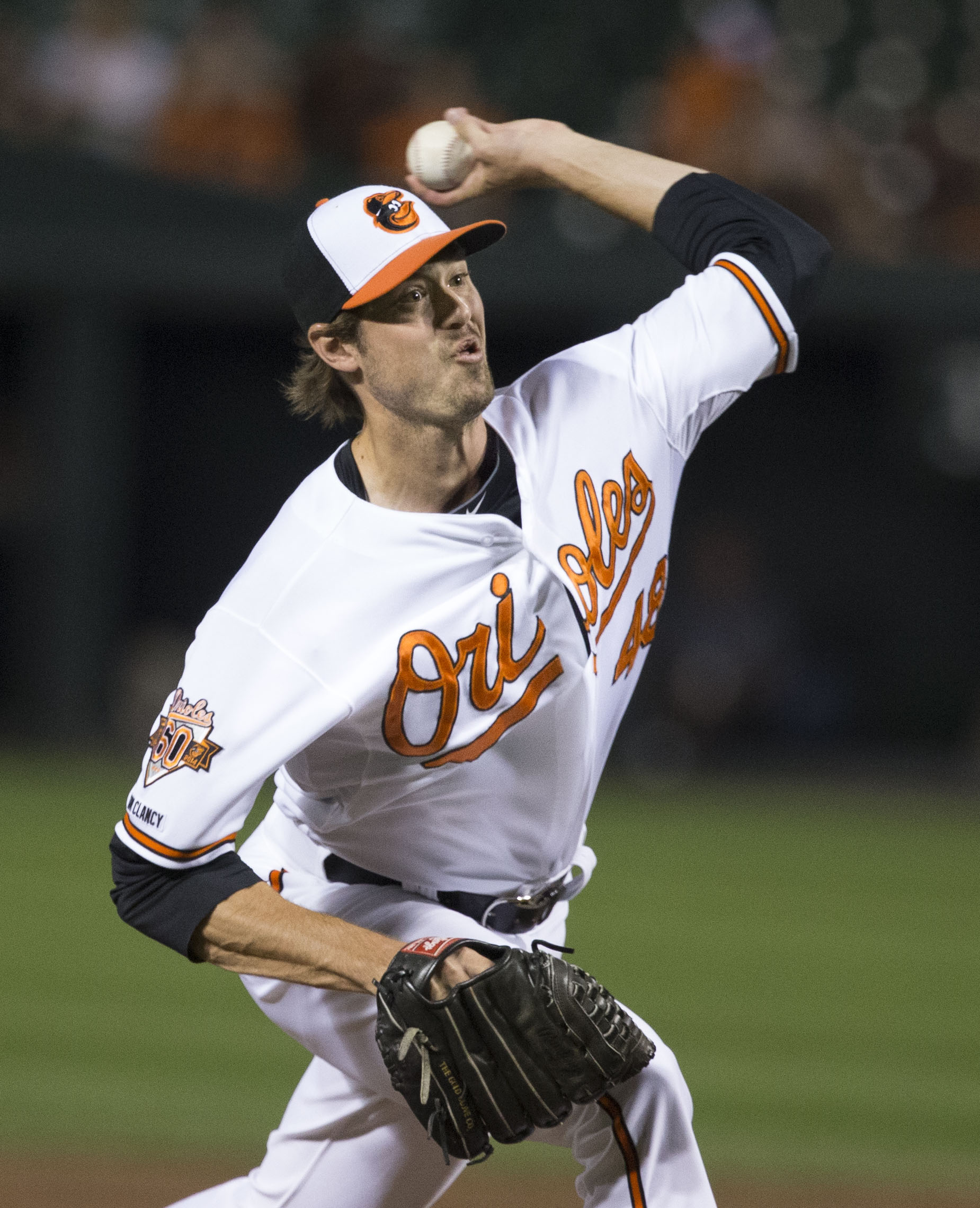
Miller pitching for the Baltimore Orioles in 2014

According to Brooks Baseball, opponents batted .071 against Miller's slider in 2014, and .153 against him overall. In 23 appearances with Baltimore, Miller finished 2–0 with a 1.35 ERA. With both Boston and Baltimore in 2014, Miller made 73 appearances going 5–5 with a 2.02 ERA and 103 strikeouts. During the Orioles' American League Division Series (ALDS) sweep of the Detroit Tigers, Miller earned a hold in two of the Oriole victories. He pitched a total of 3 2/3 innings of no-hit and no-run baseball while striking out three Tigers batters and retired 22 of 24 batters faced in seven scoreless innings overall in the 2014 playoffs.

=== New York Yankees ===
On December 5, 2014, Miller reached an agreement on a contract with the New York Yankees lasting four years and worth $36 million. Before the season started, Yankees manager Joe Girardi announced that Miller and Dellin Betances would split the closing job. Both men had one career save entering the season. Miller began the season with 17 2/3 scoreless innings, recording his first save in a Yankee uniform on April 8, 2015. On April 27, he became the first Yankee player to record eight saves in a 20-game span.

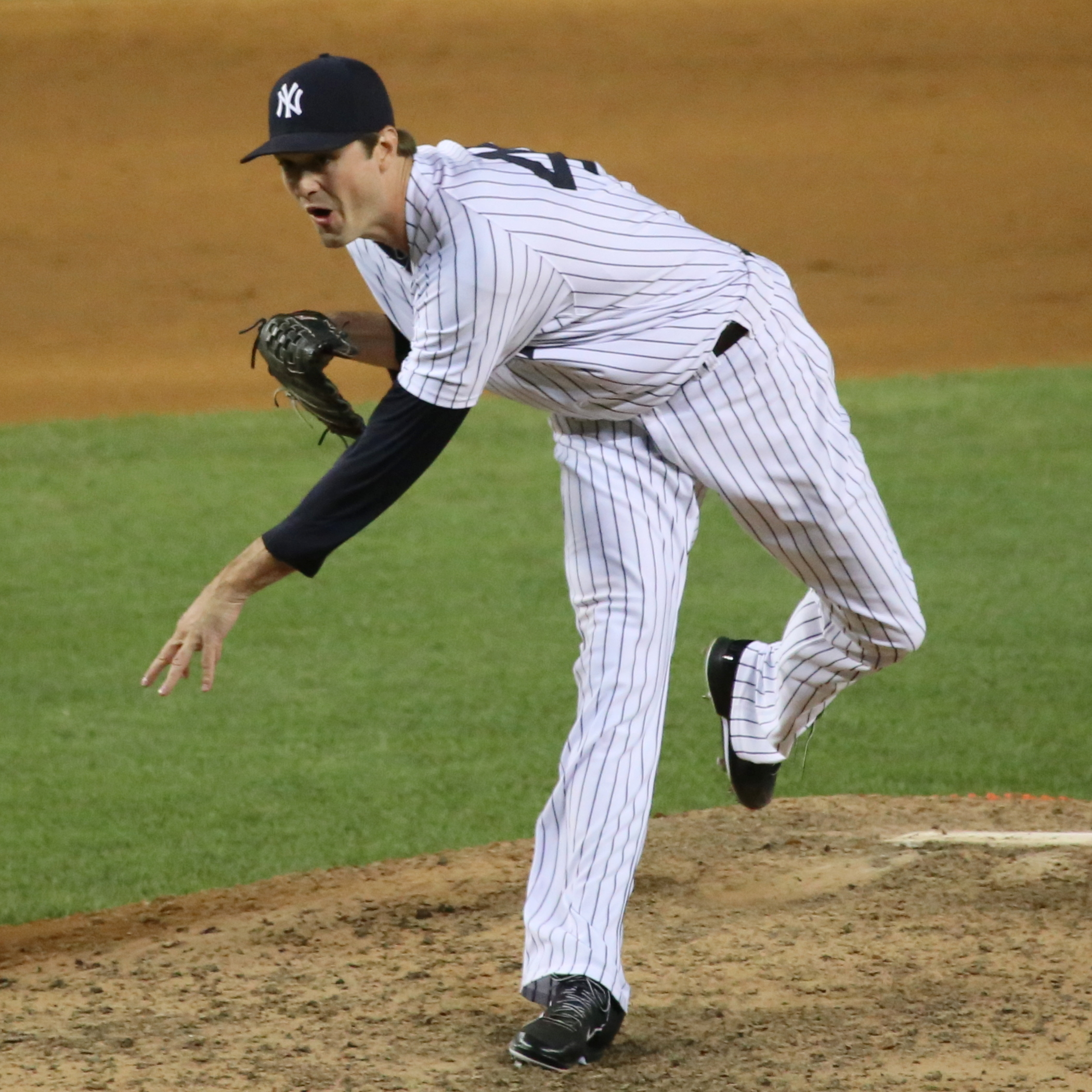
Miller pitching for the New York Yankees in 2015

According to Brooks Baseball, opponents batted .092 against Miller's slider in 2015. Miller finished the season with a 2.04 ERA, 36 saves, and 100 strikeouts in 61 2/3 innings pitched. Of all MLB pitchers, he held right-handed batters to the lowest batting average, .130 (in 30 or more innings). He won the 2015 American League Relief Pitcher of the Year Award, the Rollie Fingers American League Relief Pitcher of the Year as voted by the Internet Baseball Writers' Association of America, and was recognized at the 2016 Thurman Munson Awards as the Yankees' "premier closer" for 2015. In the AL Cy Young Award voting, Miller placed tenth.

Prior to the 2016 season, the Yankees informed Miller that he would serve as the eighth-inning setup man with the acquisition of Aroldis Chapman, considered one of baseball's top closers. However, early in spring training, MLB suspended Chapman for 30 games to commence with the start of the upcoming regular season, and the Yankees temporarily reinstalled Miller as closer. At the end of spring training, a line drive fractured the pisiform bone in his right hand. He decided to pitch with the fracture, stating that "according to Wikipedia, it's not really an important bone. It doesn't really do anything."

Until Chapman's return, Miller saved nine games. While with the Yankees, the triumvirate of Betances, Chapman and Miller were known by fans as "No Runs–D.M.C.," owing to the relievers' dominance of opposing hitters. Miller was selected to his first All-Star Game, played at Petco Park in San Diego. He pitched two-thirds of an inning and was removed after loading the bases, but no runs were charged to him. Before the midseason trade, Miller recorded 77 strikeouts in 45 1/3 innings while posting an ERA of 1.39 in 44 games for the Yankees.

=== Cleveland Indians ===
==== 2016 ====
On July 31, 2016, the Yankees traded Miller to the Cleveland Indians for Clint Frazier, Justus Sheffield, Ben Heller and J. P. Feyereisen. Miller's first save for Cleveland was in a 5−2 victory over New York at Yankee Stadium on August 6, 2016. He became the first pitcher to earn a save for and against the Yankees in the same season since 1988.

Francona, now reunited with Miller as the Indians' manager, commented that he saw "a guy that is willing to pitch any inning." He deployed Miller in every inning from the fifth into extra innings, "in the highest stress situations," appearing before the eighth inning in nine of 26 games. With Cleveland, Miller completed 29 innings, allowed two walks, and struck out 46, posting a 1.55 ERA. His aggregate 2016 regular season included 12 saves, a 10−1 record, 1.45 ERA, 0.68 walks plus hits per inning pitched (WHIP), 123 strikeouts and nine walks. He became the first major leaguer in history to record 120 or more strikeouts in a season while allowing fewer than ten walks. According to Brooks Baseball, opponents batted .159 against Miller's slider in 2016. He placed ninth in the AL Cy Young Award balloting, receiving one third place vote.

I have been in many postseasons and hadn't seen anybody dominate like Andrew Miller. Not even the great Mariano Rivera I saw having as much success as Andrew Miller, overpowering hitters.

— − Former Red Sox pitcher and Hall of Famer, Pedro Martínez, on Miller's first four 2016 playoff outings

The Indians swept Boston in the ALDS and Miller completed four innings in two appearances, permitting two hits, walking two and striking out seven. He played in two innings each of Games 1 and 2 in the American League Championship Series (ALCS) against the Toronto Blue Jays, striking out ten of 12 batters faced. After striking out Kevin Pillar in the seventh inning of Game 2, he matched Phil Coke in the 2012 World Series as the only pitchers to strike out at least five consecutive batters in the postseason. Miller also became the first pitcher in major league history to strike out at least five batters each on consecutive days. Covering his first four appearances in the 2016 postseason, he struck out 17 in 7 2/3 innings.

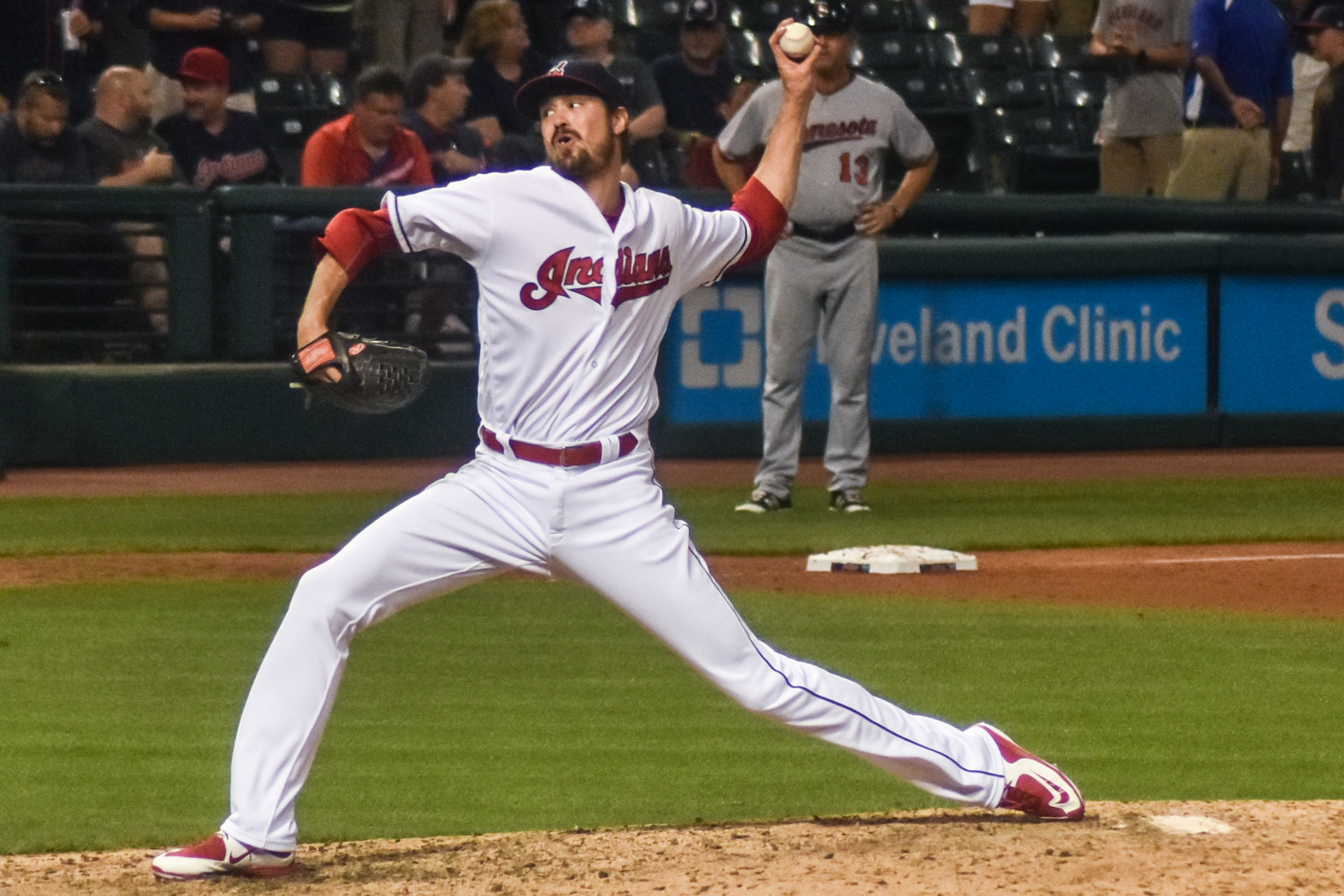
Miller pitching with the Indians in 2016

Miller recorded the final four outs of Game 3, striking out three in a 4−2 win, for his first career postseason save. In Game 5, he completed 2 2/3 innings as the Indians won the ALCS. He was named ALCS Most Valuable Player (MVP), having completed 7 2/3 scoreless innings, allowing three hits, no walks and striking out 14. His strikeout total set an ALCS record for relievers. He also was credited with three holds and one save. At that point, he had completed 20 scoreless innings to begin his playoff career.

In Game 3 of the World Series against the Chicago Cubs, Miller was credited with his first World Series win in a 1–0 victory. After striking out three of four batters faced in 1 1/3 innings, he reached 15 consecutive scoreless innings in the 2016 playoffs, surpassing Mariano Rivera and Goose Gossage to set the record for relief pitchers in a single postseason. In Game 4, he struck out two Cubs hitters, bringing his 2016 playoff total to 29, and surpassing Francisco Rodríguez' total of 28 in the 2002 postseason for the all-time record among relievers in a postseason. Another strikeout record Miller set was to strike out at least three batters each in seven different appearances, all in the 2016 postseason, and more than other MLB reliever. Dexter Fowler homered off Miller in Game 4, ending his scoreless streak at 17 innings in the 2016 playoffs and 24 1/3 to commence his postseason career. In Game 7, Miller allowed five batters to reach base and two runs to score in 2 1/3 innings as the Indians lost the game and Series. Miller's strikeout record for relievers in a single postseason reached 30, and other single-postseason records he set for relievers in 2016 were innings (19 1/3) and multi-inning appearances (10). In spite of finally succumbing in pivotal Game 7 to the Cubs' offense, Miller was named the 2016 Esurance MLB/This Year in Baseball Award winner for Best Postseason Major Leaguer.

==== 2017 ====
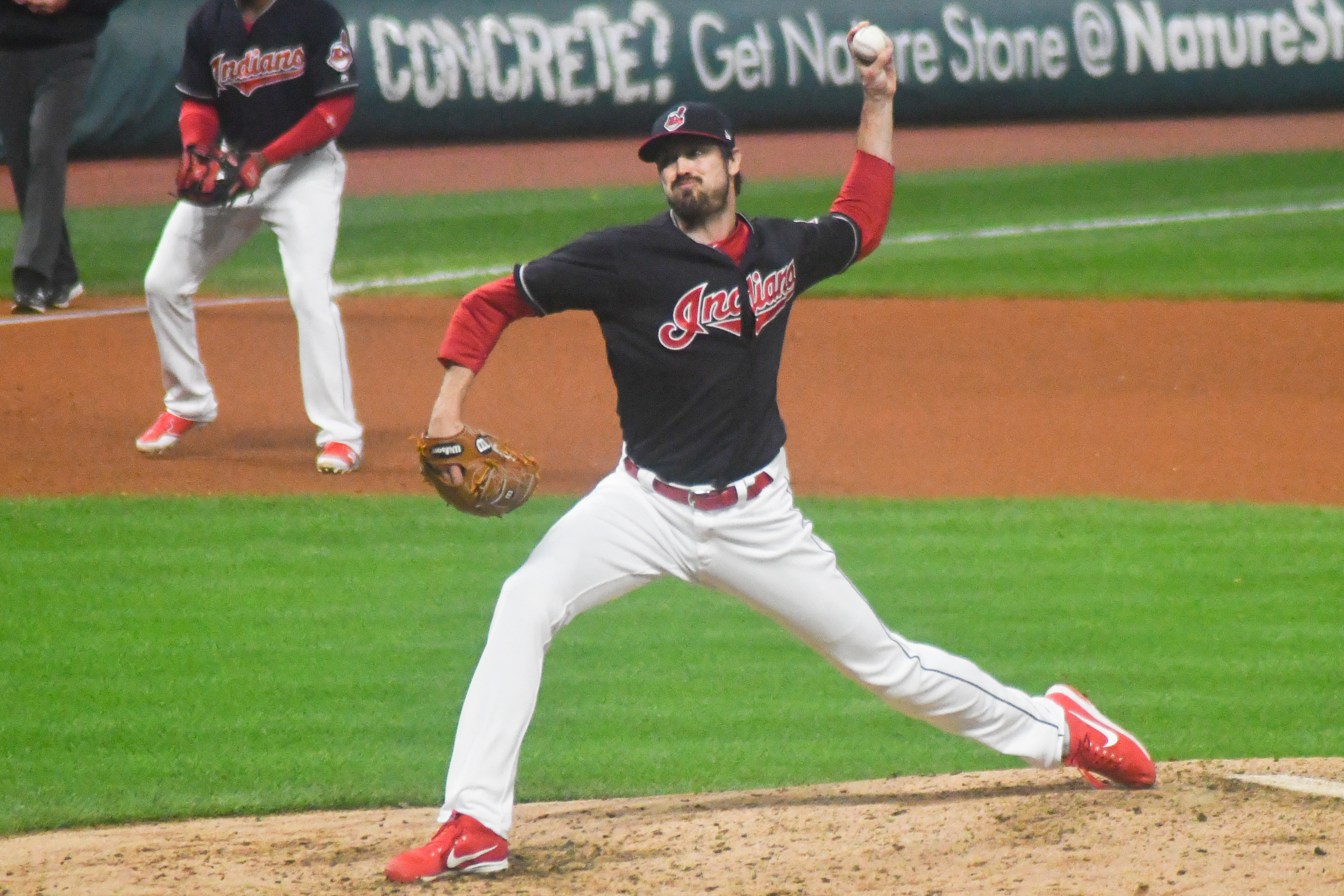
Miller pitching with the Indians in 2017

In 2017, Miller was selected to play in the All-Star Game, his second career selection. He struck out Cody Bellinger swinging to end the game and earn his first career All-Star save. On August 2, the Indians placed Miller on the 10-day disabled list due to patellar tendinitis in the right knee. He returned to action on August 21, but left the game after throwing seven pitches. It was soon revealed that he re-aggravated the same knee, and the next day, he was again placed on the 10-day disabled list. The Indians reactivated Miller on September 14, the day they broke the American League record for longest winning streak at 21 games. Miller's season totals included a 4−3 W−L, 62 2/3 innings, 1.44 ERA, 95 strikeouts, 31 hits allowed, 21 walks and two saves in 57 appearances. The Indians won an AL-best 102 games.

Miller absorbed the first loss of his playoff career on October 8, 2017, versus the Yankees, in Game 3 of the ALDS. He allowed a solo home run to Greg Bird, the only run of the game in a 1−0 score. Just one left-handed batter − Bellinger − had previously homered off Miller in 2017. The Yankees defeated the Indians in the ALDS in five games. The home run to Bird was the only run Miller allowed in the series. He made four appearances, completed five innings, and struck out eight.

=== St. Louis Cardinals ===
On December 21, 2018, Miller agreed to a two-year, $25 million contract with the St. Louis Cardinals with a vesting option for 2021. Miller finished the 2019 regular season with a 5–6 record and a 4.45 ERA, striking out 70 batters over 54 2/3 relief innings. His vesting option was applied for the 2021 season. He finished the 2020 season with a 2.77 ERA with 16 strikeouts in 13.0 innings of work.

== International career ==
As a participant for the United States national baseball team in the 2017 World Baseball Classic, Miller gave up home runs to Nelson Cruz and Starling Marte of the Dominican Republic in Team USA's first loss of the tournament. Miller earned the first major international championship of his baseball career when Team USA defeated Puerto Rico 8−0 in the final on March 22, 2017.

== Post-playing career ==
On March 24, 2022, Miller announced his retirement. He was named Special Assistant, Strategic Initiatives with the Major League Baseball Players Association (MLBPA) on July 1, 2024.

== Awards ==
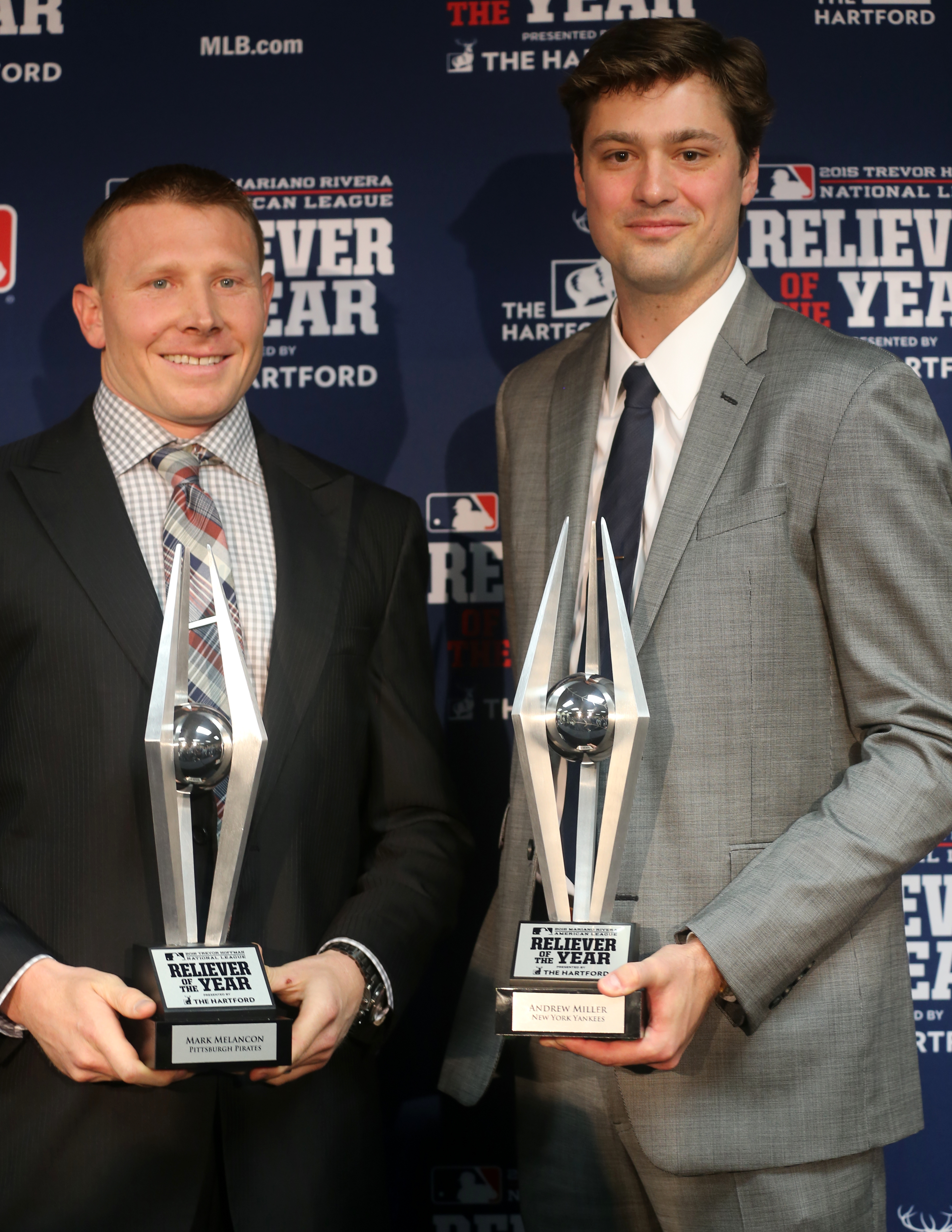
Miller (right) with the 2015 Reliever of the Year Award

Championships

- World Series champion (2013)
- American League champion (2016)
- World Baseball Classic champion (2017)

Major League, college, and international awards and exhibition team selections

- Mariano Rivera AL Reliever of the Year (2015)
- 2× Major League Baseball All-Star (2016, 2017)
- ALCS MVP (2016)
- Baseball America College Player of the Year (2006)
- Roger Clemens Award (2006)
- College Baseball All-America Team (2006)
- Atlantic Coast Conference Baseball Pitcher of the Year (2006)
- Esurance MLB/This Year in Baseball Award for Best Postseason Major Leaguer (2016)
- Thurman Munson Award as New York Yankees Premier Closer (2015)
- Cape Cod Baseball League All-Star (2004)
- Boston Red Sox Fireman of the Year (2012)
- World Baseball Classic participant for United States (2017)
- 5× Atlantic Coast Conference Pitcher of the Week

== Pitching style ==
Both attempting to lead sequences against hitters with the fastball and a myriad of mechanical issues limited Miller's success as a starting pitcher early in his major league career. He also threw a changeup more frequently earlier in his career. His most effective pitch was the slider (83-87 mph); once he began to use that more frequently, he experimented more with varying the output. One variety, with a flat and horizontal break, more closely resembled a fastball than the others by traveling in a more direct path. Another was designed to dart toward the back foot of a right-handed batter.

He's probably the nastiest guy I've ever caught. He has got a funky delivery — and throwing hard from the left side, too. He comes at you, and that slider, man, it's untouchable. Unhittable.

— − Indians catcher Roberto Pérez

Said former Tigers manager Jim Leyland of Miller's early struggles, "He was like a lot of guys breaking into the profession and wasn't sure what it was all about. He had a huge arm – big, big stuff — but he found it tough to repeat his delivery. ... He didn't have the command. But I think he's got it right. This game is hard. Success is definitely not a straight line, but are you willing to work?" Former Boston batterymate David Ross, who observed Miller while he was transitioning from starting to relieving full-time, said, "A guy like Andrew Miller has perspective on success and failure, so he understands not to take anything for granted and to stay in the moment and continue to do what he does best. That's character."

With each of the different teams for which he played before converting to relief, Miller experimented with different pitching philosophies. Detroit encouraged him to throw harder while Florida wanted him to throw more changeups and curveballs. He also experimented with the different arm slots. One day while playing bullpen catch with Edward Mujica as teammates in Boston, Mujica suggested that Miller keep his back foot on the rubber as long as possible. This allowed Miller to increase the stability of his feet before pivoting, which aided his mechanics.

== Personal life ==
Andrew Miller is married to Katie (née Roark) Miller, who is also from Gainesville, Florida, where they met. Roark attended Duke University and was a four-year letter recipient in soccer for the Blue Devils. As of 2014, the Millers resided in Tampa, Florida. They have a son who was born in 2012.

== See also ==
- Cleveland Guardians award winners and league leaders
- List of University of North Carolina at Chapel Hill alumni
