= Alexander Smit =

Dutch baseball player (born 1985)

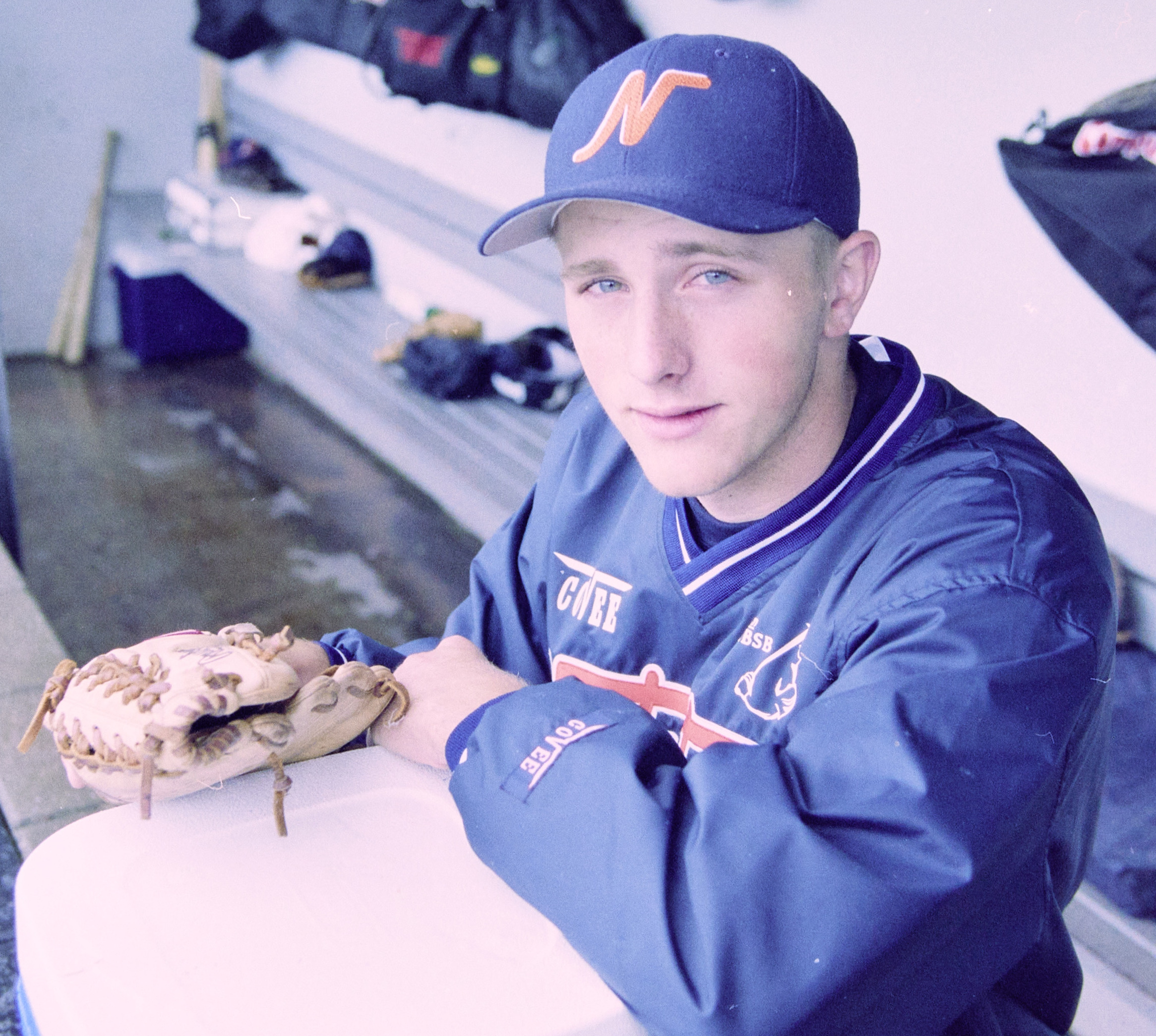
- Smit in 2002
- Pitcher
- Born: 2 October 1985 (age 40); Geldrop, Netherlands
- Bats: Left Throws: Left
- Stats at Baseball Reference
Medals
Men's baseball
Representing Netherlands
European Baseball Championship
| Gold medal – first place | 2003 Netherlands | National team |

Alexander Roelof Smit (born 2 October 1985 in Geldrop) is a Dutch former baseball pitcher who has played with the Netherlands national baseball team in two Summer Olympics and two World Baseball Classic tournaments. He pitched in Minor League Baseball for eight seasons.

Smit began his baseball career pitching for PSV in Eindhoven. The Minnesota Twins signed Smit as an international free agent on 14 July 2002 for $800,000, at the time a record for a player in the top Dutch league. While originally a starting pitcher, he worked in relief exclusively in 2005, when he was named as an Appalachian League All-Star. He was added to the Twins 40-man roster after the 2006 season, though he struggled with consistency and conditioning. He was claimed off waivers by the Cincinnati Reds on 12 July 2007. He also dealt with back injuries in 2007 and 2009. He pitched in the American minor leagues through 2010, reaching Double-A. That June, he told the Reds that he wanted to return to the Netherlands.

Smit played for the Netherlands in international tournaments. He won the Roel de Mon Award, given to the best youth pitcher, 2000, 2001, and 2002. He also played on the national youth team before debuting with the national team in 2002. He was on the Netherlands teams at the 2004 Summer Olympics in Athens, Greece, where he and his team finished in sixth place, at the 2008 Summer Olympics in Beijing. He did not fare well in the Olympics, allowing 8 runs off three home runs in 7 innings in 2004, then going 0–2 with 10 runs allowed in 10 2/3 innings in 2008.

Smit also pitched in the 2006 and 2009 World Baseball Classic (WBC) and 2002 Intercontinental Cup. In the 2006 WBC, he allowed one run in one inning pitched. In 2009, he pitched 3 1/3 scoreless innings, allowing five batters to reach base. Smit also won the 2003 European Baseball Championship with the Netherlands.
