= Roel de Mon =

Dutch baseball player (1919–1973)

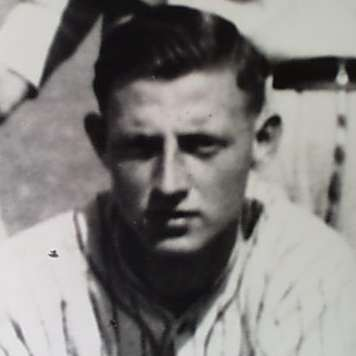
- Pitcher
- Born: 5 November 1919; Haarlem, Netherlands
- Died: 2 November 1973 (aged 53); Haarlem, Netherlands
- Batted: Unknown Threw: Right

Member of the Netherlands

Baseball Hall of Fame
- Induction: 1984

Roel de Mon (5 November 1919 – 2 November 1973) was a Dutch baseball player. He was claimed to be the fastest Dutch pitcher of all time. He played most of his career between 1940 and 1948, winning the Hoofdklasse national baseball championship four times with SC Haarlem and Schoten.

== Career ==
Considered one of the most dominant pitchers of his era (along with Han Urbanus), Dutch baseball historian Chris Kabout observed that "when you managed to get a hit against [de Mon], you had a starting spot in the Dutch national team."

World War II disrupted de Mon's international career. He played only two games internationally against Belgium and, right after the war, one against an American-Canadian Army team. An army officer who was a Major League manager in daily life invited de Mon to come and play baseball in the U.S. However, de Mon stayed in the Netherlands to help build up the country after the war.

== Legacy ==
de Mon still possesses the Hoofdklasse records for single-season strikeouts (235 in 1943 over 14 games) and single-game strikeouts (26, from a 1943 game between Schoten and VVGA). He fanned 683 batters in 40 games in 1940, 1941 and 1943, averaging over 17 per game.

de Mon's hard throwing and frequent pitching, including starting both weekend Hoofdklasse games, caused a serious injury to his throwing arm, which shortened his baseball career.

de Mon was inducted into the Netherlands Baseball Hall of Fame in 1984.

Since 1969, the Roel de Mon Award has been awarded to the best pitcher in the Dutch youth league, which was called the Roel de Mon League till the late 1980s. Winners have included Harry Koster, Alexander Smit, David Bergman, and Tom de Blok.

== Personal life ==
de Mon was married in 1946. They had a son. de Mon died in 1973 after serious heart failure, at age 53.
