= Collegiate Baseball Newspaper =

American publication based in Arizona

Collegiate Baseball Newspaper (also known as Collegiate Baseball Magazine and Collegiate Baseball; commonly abbreviated CB) was an American publication based in Arizona that considered itself the "voice of amateur baseball" and was published for over 40 years. The publication gave out several awards: Collegiate Baseball Player of the Year, Collegiate Baseball Coach of the Year, and Collegiate Baseball All-Americans.

It was published twice a month from January until June, and then once each in September and October.

The "Collegiate Baseball" newspaper poll was college sports' oldest baseball poll. A ranking of the top 30 teams was released prior to the season, weekly throughout the season, and after the conclusion of the College World Series. It started with the 1957 college baseball season. The publication has ceased operation as of November 2023.

== Collegiate Baseball Player of the Year ==
The Collegiate Baseball Player of the Year award was given to the best player in NCAA Division I. It was first awarded in 1984.

Player of the Year
| Season | Player | Position | Team |
|---|---|---|---|
| 1984 | Oddibe McDowell | OF | Arizona State |
| 1985 | Pete Incaviglia | OF | Oklahoma State |
| 1986 | Greg Swindell | P | Texas |
| 1987 | Marteese Robinson | 1B | Seton Hall |
| 1987 | Robin Ventura | 3B | Oklahoma State |
| 1988 | Andy Benes | P | Evansville |
| 1989 | Scott Bryant | UT | Texas |
| 1989 | Ben McDonald | P | Louisiana State |
| 1990 | Mike Kelly | OF | Arizona State |
| 1991 | Bobby Jones | P | Fresno State |
| 1992 | Lloyd Peever | P | Louisiana State |
| 1993 | Brooks Kieschnick | UT | Texas |
| 1994 | Ryan Jackson | UT | Duke |
| 1995 | Todd Helton | UT | Tennessee |
| 1995 | Mark Kotsay | OF | Cal State Fullerton |
| 1996 | Kris Benson | P | Clemson |
| 1997 | J. D. Drew | OF | Florida State |
| 1998 | Kevin Mench | OF | Delaware |
| 1999 | Jason Jennings | UT | Baylor |
| 2000 | Kip Bouknight | P | South Carolina |
| 2001 | Mark Prior | P | Southern California |
| 2002 | Khalil Greene | SS | Clemson |
| 2003 | Rickie Weeks | 2B | Southern |
| 2004 | Jered Weaver | P | Long Beach State |
| 2005 | Shane Robinson | OF | Florida State |
| 2006 | Kellen Kulbacki | OF | James Madison |
| 2006 | Wes Roemer | P | Cal State Fullerton |
| 2007 | David Price | P | Vanderbilt |
| 2007 | Tony Thomas, Jr. | INF | Florida State |
| 2008 | Buster Posey | C | Florida State |
| 2009 | Stephen Strasburg | P | San Diego State |
| 2010 | Chris Sale | P | Florida Gulf Coast |
| 2011 | Trevor Bauer | P | UCLA |
| 2012 | Nick Petree | P | Missouri State |
| 2013 | Kris Bryant | 3B | San Diego |
| 2014 | A. J. Reed | 3B/P | Kentucky |
| 2015 | Andrew Benintendi | OF | Arkansas |
| 2016 | Eric Lauer | P | Kent State |
| 2017 | Brendan McKay | 1B/P | Louisville |
| 2017 | Brent Rooker | 1B | Mississippi State |
| 2018 | Bren Spillane | 1B/OF | Illinois |
| 2019 | Adley Rutschman | C | Oregon State |
| 2020 | Nick Gonzales | SS | New Mexico State |
| 2021 | Kevin Kopps | RP | Arkansas |
| 2022 | Ivan Melendez | 1B | Texas |
| 2023 | Paul Skenes | P | LSU |

== Collegiate Baseball Coach of the Year ==
The Collegiate Baseball Coach of the Year award was given to the best coach in NCAA Division I. It was first awarded in 1980.

Coach of the Year
| Season | Coach | Team |
|---|---|---|
| 1980 | Jerry Kindall | Arizona |
| 1981 | Jim Brock | Arizona State |
| 1982 | Ron Fraser | Miami (FL) |
| 1983 | Cliff Gustafson | Texas |
| 1984 | Augie Garrido | Cal State Fullerton |
| 1985 | Ron Fraser | Miami (FL) |
| 1986 | Jerry Kindall | Arizona |
| 1987 | Mark Marquess | Stanford |
| 1988 | Larry Cochell | Cal State Fullerton |
| 1989 | Dave Snow | Long Beach State |
| 1990 | Steve Webber | Georgia |
| 1991 | Skip Bertman | Louisiana State |
| 1992 | Andy Lopez | Pepperdine |
| 1993 | Skip Bertman | Louisiana State |
| 1994 | Larry Cochell | Oklahoma |
| 1995 | Augie Garrido | Cal State Fullerton |
| 1996 | Skip Bertman | Louisiana State |
| 1996 | Andy Lopez | Florida |
| 1997 | Skip Bertman | Louisiana State |
| 1998 | Mike Batesole | Cal State Northridge |
| 1998 | Mike Gillespie | Southern California |
| 1999 | Jim Morris | Miami (FL) |
| 2000 | Skip Bertman | Louisiana State |
| 2001 | Jim Morris | Miami |
| 2002 | Augie Garrido | Texas |
| 2003 | Wayne Graham | Rice |
| 2004 | George Horton | Cal State Fullerton |
| 2005 | Augie Garrido | Texas |
| 2006 | Pat Casey | Oregon State |
| 2007 | Pat Casey | Oregon State |
| 2008 | Mike Batesole | Fresno State |
| 2009 | Paul Mainieri | Louisiana State |
| 2010 | Ray Tanner | South Carolina |
| 2011 | Ray Tanner | South Carolina |
| 2012 | Andy Lopez | Arizona |
| 2013 | John Savage | UCLA |
| 2014 | Tim Corbin | Vanderbilt |
| 2015 | Brian O'Connor | Virginia |
| 2016 | Gary Gilmore | Coastal Carolina |
| 2017 | Kevin O'Sullivan | Florida |
| 2018 | Pat Casey | Oregon State |
| 2019 | Tim Corbin | Vanderbilt |
| 2020 | Mike Bianco | Ole Miss |
| 2021 | Tim Corbin | Vanderbilt |
| 2022 | Mike Bianco | Ole Miss |
| 2023 | Jay Johnson | LSU |

== Collegiate Baseball All-Americans ==
The Collegiate Baseball All-Americans award was given to the best players at various positions in NCAA Division I. It was first awarded in 1981.

== Collegiate Baseball Freshmen All-Americans ==
=== Louisville Slugger's Freshmen All-American Baseball Team ===
See footnote

=== Collegiate Baseball Freshman Pitcher of the Year ===
Beginning in 2016, the magazine began awarding honors to freshman starting pitchers and freshman relief pitchers.

- 2005 – Mickey Storey (RHP, Florida Atlantic)
- 2006 – Alex Wilson (RHP, Winthrop)
- 2007 – Ryan Berry (RHP, Rice)
- 2008 – Chris Hernandez (LHP, University of Miami)
- 2009 – Trevor Bauer (RHP, UCLA)
- 2010 – Matt Purke (LHP, Texas Christian)
- 2011 – Corey Knebel (RHP, Texas)
- 2012 – Carlos Rodon (LHP, N.C. State)
- 2013 – Thomas Eshelman (RHP, Cal St. Fullerton)
- 2014 – Zach Plesac (RHP, Ball State)
- 2015 – Alex Lange (RHP, LSU)
- 2017 – SP Sean Mooney (RHP, St. John's); RP Kenyon Yovan (RHP, Oregon)
- 2018 – SP Patrick Fredrickson (RHP, Minnesota); RP Max Meyer, (RHP, Minnesota)
- 2019 – SP Tyler Thornton (RHP, St. Mary's); SP J. T. Ginn (RHP, Mississippi St.)

=== Collegiate Baseball Freshman Player of the Year ===
Before 2005, there was not a specific award known as the "Freshmen Pitcher of the Year." Rather, there were multiple Players of the Year awarded each season.

- 1998 – Hayden Gliemmo (LHP, Auburn), Aaron Heilman (RHP Notre Dame), Xavier Nady (2B, California)
- 1999 – James Jurries (2B, Tulane), Mark Teixeira (3B, Georgia Tech), Blair Varnes (RHP, Florida State)
- 2000 – Kevin Howard (3B, Miami), Zane Carlson (RP, Baylor), Mike Fontenot (2B, Louisiana State)
- 2001 – Lane Mestepey (LHP, Louisiana State), Jamie D'Antona (1B, Wake Forest)
- 2002 – Philip Humber (RHP, Rice), Vincent Sinisi (1B, Rice), Darryl Lawhorn (1B, East Carolina)
- 2003 – Mark Romanczuk (LHP, Stanford), Glen Perkins (LHP, Minnesota), Jeff Clement (Southern California), Stephen Head (Mississippi)
- 2004 – Wade LeBlanc (LHP, Alabama), Tim Lincecum (RHP, Washington), Blair Erickson (U.C. Irvine)
- 2005 – Joe Savery (Rice)
- 2006 – Pedro Alvarez (3B, Vanderbilt)
- 2007 – Dustin Ackley (1B, North Carolina)
- 2008 – Ryan Lockwood (OF, South Florida)
- 2009 – Anthony Rendon (3B, Rice)
- 2010 – Jeremy Baltz (OF, St. John's)
- 2012 – Michael Conforto (OF, Oregon State)
- 2013 – Alex Bregman (SS, Louisiana State)
- 2014 – Jake Noll (2B, Florida Gulf Coast)
- 2015 – Brendan McKay (Louisville), J. J. Schwarz, (Florida)
- 2016 – Seth Beer (Clemson), Kevin Strohschein (Tennessee Tech)
- 2017 – Kevin Milam (DH/RHP, Saint Mary's), Braden Shewmake (2B, Texas A&M)
- 2018 – Spencer Torkelson (1B, Arizona State), Ryan Ward (OF, Bryant)

== See also ==
- Baseball awards § U.S. college baseball
