= Kellen Kulbacki =

American baseball player (born 1985)

- Outfielder
- Born: November 21, 1985 (age 40); Harrisburg, Pennsylvania, U.S.
- Bats: Left Throws: Left
- Stats at Baseball Reference

Kellen Robert Kulbacki (born November 21, 1985) is an American former professional baseball player who won numerous awards and honors during his college career. He was drafted by the San Diego Padres in the first round of the 2007 Major League Baseball draft.

== Amateur career ==
Kulbacki was born in Harrisburg, Pennsylvania and attended Hershey High School in Hershey, Pennsylvania. In his senior year at high school, he was named the Keystone Division Player of the Year.

He then attended James Madison University from 2005 to 2007, hitting .343/.392/.552 in his first year. That year, he was named to the Colonial Athletic Association All-Rookie team and earned the Kevin Nehring Rookie of the Year Award. Later, with the Herndon Braves in the Clark Griffith League, he won MVP honors.

His sophomore year, he hit .464/.568/.943 with 24 home runs, 75 RBI and 13 stolen bases in 53 games to co-earn Collegiate Baseball Newspaper's College Baseball Player of the Year honor, alongside Wes Roemer. He earned many other honors that season, including VaSID State Player of the Year, CAA Player of the Year and All-CAA first team, NCBWA District IV Player of the Year and ABCA All-East and VaSID All-State first team. The following organizations named him first-team All-American: Collegiate Baseball Newspaper, Baseball America, the American Baseball Coaches Association, the National Collegiate Baseball Writers Association, the College Baseball Foundation and Rivals.com. He was a finalist for the Dick Howser Trophy and the Brooks Wallace Award.

Later in the summer, he played for the Cotuit Kettleers of the Cape Cod League. He returned to James Madison University for 2007 to hit .398/.538/.785 with 19 home runs and 49 RBI. He again earned several honors, including first-team All-American selections by Baseball America, Rivals.com, Ping!Baseball, and the NCBWA.

== Professional career ==
Kulbacki was taken as the 40th overall selection in the 2007 Major League Baseball draft by the San Diego Padres. The signing scout was Ash Lawson.

He hit .301/.382/.491 in 61 games for the Eugene Emeralds in his first professional season to earn Baseball America Short-Season All-Star honors, as well as a Northwest League Player of the Week selection. In 2008, Kulbacki hit .332/.428/.589 with 20 home runs and 66 RBI in 84 games for the Lake Elsinore Storm. He also batted .164 in 18 games for the Fort Wayne Wizards to bring his season totals to .304/.400/.540 with 22 home runs and 75 RBI. He earned a California League Player of the Week honor, a Post-Season All-Star selection and a Baseball America High Class-A All-Star selection. Going into 2009, he was named the fourth-best prospect in the Padres system by Baseball America and the 89th-best prospect in the game by Baseball Prospectus.

Injuries toward the end of the 2008 campaign affected the rest of his career.

He was officially released by the Padres prior to the 2011 campaign and joined the independent leagues for 2011 and 2012. Overall, he hit .273 with 32 home runs and 137 RBI in 238 games.
