= Tom de Blok =

Dutch baseball player (born 1996)

- Pitcher
- Born: 8 May 1996 (age 30); Amstelveen, Netherlands
- Bats: Right Throws: Right
- Stats at Baseball Reference
Medals
Men's baseball
Representing Netherlands
European Baseball Championship
Gold medal – first place	2016 Hoofddorp	Team
Gold medal – first place	2019 Bonn	Team
Bronze medal – third place	2023 Czechia	Team
Gold medal – first place	2025 Rotterdam	Team

Tom Robin de Blok (born 8 May 1996) is a Dutch former professional baseball player who pitched for the Netherlands national team in two World Baseball Classic tournaments. He pitched in Minor League Baseball from 2017 to 2019, one game in the Mexican Baseball League in 2021, and several stints the Honkbal Hoofdklasse from 2014 to 2025.

== Playing career ==
=== Seattle Mariners ===
On 26 August 2013, de Blok signed a minor league contract with the Seattle Mariners after participating in an MLB European Academy in Germany and throwing a 90 mile-per-hour fastball. However, on 17 April 2014, de Blok formally retired from professional baseball, saying he was not happy with his experience in America.

=== HCAW ===
Back in the Netherlands, de Blok joined HCAW in the Honkbal Hoofdklasse for the 2014 season. As a reliever, he had an 0–3 record with two saves and a 3.20 earned run average (ERA) in 17 games pitched.

=== Amsterdam Pirates ===
In 2015, de Blok joined the Amsterdam Pirates, where he had a 4–0 record with three saves and a 1.54 ERA in 20 games. He pitched well in 2016, going 5–0 with five saves and a 0.88 ERA and 43 strikeouts in 41 innings. After the season, de Blok had a two-day tryout with the Rakuten Golden Eagles of Nippon Professional Baseball (NPB). However, he decided to return to the Pirates.

=== Detroit Tigers ===
After his performance in the 2017 World Baseball Classic, de Blok signed a minor league contract with the Detroit Tigers on 10 April 2017. He made his affiliated debut with the Single-A West Michigan Whitecaps, pitching once for the Low-A Connecticut Tigers in June. Working as both a starter and reliever, he had a combined 4–2 record and 2.74 ERA in 82 innings. He spent the first two months of 2018 with the High-A Lakeland Flying Tigers before being demoted back to West Michigan. He had a combined 5–6 record and 4.71 ERA in 19 starts. He suffered a broken elbow that season. de Blok spent the entire 2019 season with Lakeland, recording a 2–13 record and 4.04 ERA in 21 games. He did not play in a game in 2020 due to the cancellation of the minor league season because of the COVID-19 pandemic. He elected free agency in November.

=== Amsterdam Pirates (second stint) ===
de Blok returned to Amsterdam, with a 2.00 ERA in five games in 2020. In 2021, he posted a 3–2 record and 1.64 ERA in six games with the team. On 14 May, de Blok threw the fourth perfect game in the history of the Hoofdklasse, defeating DSS/Kinheim 12–0 and striking out seven batters in a seven-inning game.

=== Pericos de Puebla ===
On 27 June 2021, de Blok signed with the Pericos de Puebla of the Mexican Baseball League. He made just one start before he was released on 8 July. He suffered another elbow injury after his one game with Puebla, having surgery after returning to Amsterdam. He did not pitch in 2022 due to his injury.

=== Neptunus ===
On 1 October 2022, de Blok signed Neptunus of the Hoofdklasse. In 2023, he resumed his effectiveness in the Dutch league, with a 7–0 record, a 1.59 ERA, and 89 strikeouts in 14 starts. He threw a two-hit shutout on 25 April 2023. He matched his performance in 2024, going 7–1 with a 1.33 ERA and 74 strikeouts in 13 starts. de Blok won two games in the Holland Series as Neptunus swept one of his former teams, HCAW. He was one of the league's best pitchers again in 2025. After suffering another broken elbow in the 2025 European Baseball Championship, de Blok was unable to pitch but appeared as a batter for Neptunus in the 2026 regular season finale, striking out. He announced his retirement following the game.

== International career ==
de Blok was a member of the Netherlands national team in the 2017 World Baseball Classic (WBC) and the 2023 WBC. He threw two scoreless innings in the 2017 tournament, which led him to signing with the Detroit Tigers. In the 2023 WBC, he made one start, allowing one run in three innings against Cuba.

de Blok played for the Netherlands in other tournaments, including the 2016, 2019, and 2023 European Baseball Championships, Africa/Europe 2020 Olympic Qualification tournament, and 2024 WBSC Premier12. He suffered an arm injury in the first inning of the 2025 European championship semifinal game against Spain. That short start was his 26th and final international game, as he retired due to injury in 2026.

== Personal life ==
de Blok has two sons.
