= Wes Roemer =

American baseball player (born 1986)

Kotlářka Praha – No. 49
- Pitcher
- Born: October 7, 1986 (age 39); Los Angeles, California, U.S.
- Bats: Right Throws: Right
- Stats at Baseball Reference

Wesley William Roemer (born October 7, 1986) is an American baseball pitcher for Kotlářka Praha of the Czech Baseball Extraliga. Roemer is known for co-winning the Collegiate Baseball Newspaper Collegiate Baseball Player of the Year honor in 2006, along with Kellen Kulbacki, while attending California State University Fullerton. He was later drafted in the first round, 50th overall, by the Arizona Diamondbacks in the 2007 Major League Baseball draft.

He was born in Los Angeles, California and attended Glendora High School in Glendora, California. He joined Cal State Fullerton in 2005, going 7–3 with a 3.80 ERA his first season. In 2006, he was 13–2 with 145 strikeouts and a 2.38 ERA in 155 innings, completing three games, shutting out two and allowing only seven walks (he began the year by going 65.2 innings without allowing a walk) and 126 hits. Other honors he earned that year include Big West Conference Pitcher of the Year, Big West Pitcher of the Week (four times), unanimous All-American selection and ABCA District IX Player of the Year. He was also a finalist for the Roger Clemens Award, Dick Howser Trophy and Brooks Wallace Award. He returned for 2007 and went 11–7 with a 3.19 ERA, striking out 150 batters in 144 innings.

He joined the Diamondbacks system in 2007 after being signed by scout Mark Baca. He played in their organization until 2011, winning 10 or more games once – in 2009, when he went 12–10 with a 3.86 ERA in 28 starts between the Visalia Rawhide and Mobile BayBears. He reached Triple-A for the first time in 2010 and returned to that level in 2011. In 2012, he pitched in the Los Angeles Dodgers system and in the independent leagues, where he also played in 2013 and 2014. He never played in the major leagues, though he spent time with the major league club during spring training in 2008, 2009 and 2010. In 2011, he was a Southern League Mid-Season All-Star; at one point during the campaign, he took a no hitter into the eighth inning. He finished his professional career with a 36–39 record and a 4.31 ERA.
