= 2016 Minnesota Twins season =

2016 Minnesota Twins
- League: American League
- Division: Central
- Ballpark: Target Field
- City: Minneapolis, Minnesota
- Record: 59–103 (.364)
- Divisional place: 5th
- Owners: Jim Pohlad
- General managers: Terry Ryan (fired July 18); Rob Antony (interim)
- Managers: Paul Molitor
- Television: Fox Sports North (Dick Bremer, Bert Blyleven)
- Radio: KTWN-FM (Cory Provus, Dan Gladden)
- Stats: ESPN.com; Baseball Reference

The 2016 Minnesota Twins season was the 56th season for the franchise in the Twin Cities of Minnesota, their seventh season at Target Field and the 116th overall in the American League. The 2016 season marked the 25th anniversary of the 1991 Twins World Series victory, and the 2016 team wore commemorative patches. The team finished in fifth place in the American League Central and lost 103 games, the worst record in the majors and the most losses since the franchise relocated to Minnesota in 1961.

== Summary ==
The Twins signed Korean baseball star Byung-ho Park in the offseason, in addition to acquiring John Ryan Murphy, a catcher, in a trade with the Yankees. The team's encouraging 83–79 finish the previous season behind good rookie seasons from Miguel Sano, Eddie Rosario, Tyler Duffey, and Byron Buxton, along with the anticipated arrival of Minor Leaguers José Berríos and Max Kepler, gave Twins' fans high hopes for the 2016 season. However, the season became a complete disaster, starting with the Twins losing their first nine games of the season and never getting out of last place in the AL Central. They finished with a record of 59–103, the worst in the league. The 103 losses marked the worst record in Twins history, besting the 60–102 team of 1982.

== Season standings ==
=== American League Central ===
AL Central
Team	W	L	Pct.	GB	Home	Road
Cleveland Indians	94	67	.584	—	53‍–‍28	41‍–‍39
Detroit Tigers	86	75	.534	8	45‍–‍35	41‍–‍40
Kansas City Royals	81	81	.500	13½	47‍–‍34	34‍–‍47
Chicago White Sox	78	84	.481	16½	45‍–‍36	33‍–‍48
Minnesota Twins	59	103	.364	35½	30‍–‍51	29‍–‍52

=== American League Wild Card ===
Division leaders
Team	W	L	Pct.
Texas Rangers	95	67	.586
Cleveland Indians	94	67	.584
Boston Red Sox	93	69	.574

Wild Card teams (Top 2 teams qualify for postseason)
Team	W	L	Pct.	GB
Toronto Blue Jays	89	73	.549	—
Baltimore Orioles	89	73	.549	—
Detroit Tigers	86	75	.534	2½
Seattle Mariners	86	76	.531	3
New York Yankees	84	78	.519	5
Houston Astros	84	78	.519	5
Kansas City Royals	81	81	.500	8
Chicago White Sox	78	84	.481	11
Los Angeles Angels	74	88	.457	15
Oakland Athletics	69	93	.426	20
Tampa Bay Rays	68	94	.420	21
Minnesota Twins	59	103	.364	30

=== Record against opponents ===
2016 American League record Source: MLB Standings Grid – 2016
Team	BAL	BOS	CWS	CLE	DET	HOU	KC	LAA	MIN	NYY	OAK	SEA	TB	TEX	TOR	NL
Baltimore	—	8–11	4–3	5–1	5–2	1–6	4–2	4–2	5–1	10–9	3–4	1–6	13–6	3–4	9–10	14–6
Boston	11–8	—	3–4	4–2	2–5	5–2	2–4	4–3	4–3	11–8	5–1	4–3	12–7	3–3	9–10	14–6
Chicago	3–4	4–3	—	8–11	7–12	3–3	5–14	2–5	12–7	3–3	5–2	4–3	4–3	4–2	5–1	9–11
Cleveland	1–5	2–4	11–8	—	14–4	3–4	14–5	6–1	10–9	2–5	4–2	3–4	5–1	2–5	4–3	13–7
Detroit	2–5	5–2	12–7	4–14	—	4–2	7–12	2–4	15–4	3–3	4–3	4–3	6–1	2–4	3–4	13–7
Houston	6–1	2–5	3–3	4–3	2–4	—	3–4	13–6	5–2	2–4	13–6	11–8	3–3	4–15	2–5	11–9
Kansas City	2–4	4–2	14–5	5–14	12–7	4–3	—	1–5	15–4	2–5	1–6	3–4	5–2	1–6	2–4	10–10
Los Angeles	2–4	3–4	5–2	1–6	4–2	6–13	5–1	—	2–4	1–6	12–7	8–11	3–4	9–10	4–3	9–11
Minnesota	1–5	3–4	7–12	9–10	4–15	2–5	4–15	4–2	—	2–5	2–4	4–2	3–4	5–2	1–6	8–12
New York	9–10	8–11	3–3	5–2	3–3	4–2	5–2	6–1	5–2	—	4–3	3–3	11–8	3–4	7–12	8–12
Oakland	4–3	1–5	2–5	2–4	3–4	6–13	6–1	7–12	4–2	3–4	—	7–12	5–2	9–10	3–3	7–13
Seattle	6–1	3–4	3–4	4–3	3–4	8–11	4–3	11–8	2–4	3–3	12–7	—	4–2	7–12	3–3	13–7
Tampa Bay	6–13	7–12	3–4	1–5	1–6	3–3	2–5	4–3	4–3	8–11	2–5	2–4	—	4–2	11–8	10–10
Texas	4–3	3–3	2–4	5–2	4–2	15–4	6–1	10–9	2–5	4–3	10–9	12–7	2–4	—	3–4	13–7
Toronto	10–9	10–9	1–5	3–4	4–3	5–2	4–2	3–4	6–1	12–7	3–3	3–3	8–11	4–3	—	13–7

== Game log ==
2016 Game Log: 59−103 (Home: 30−51; Away: 29−52)
April: 7–17 (Home: 6–7; Away: 1–10)

#	Date	Opponent	Score	Win	Loss	Save	Attendance	Record	Streak
1	April 4	@ Orioles	2–3	Britton (1–0)	**Jepsen** (0–1)	—	45,785	0–1	L1
2	April 6	@ Orioles	2–4	Gallardo (1–0)	**Gibson** (0–1)	Britton (1)	12,622	0–2	L2
3	April 7	@ Orioles	2–4	Jiménez (1–0)	**Hughes** (0–1)	O'Day (1)	11,142	0–3	L3
4	April 8	@ Royals	3–4	Soria (1–0)	**Jepsen** (0–2)	Davis (2)	27,166	0–4	L4
5	April 9	@ Royals	0–7	Kennedy (1–0)	**Milone** (0–1)	—	31,001	0–5	L5
6	April 10	@ Royals	3–4 (10)	Davis (1–0)	**May** (0–1)	—	35,317	0–6	L6
7	April 11	White Sox	1–4	Quintana (1–0)	**Gibson** (0–2)	Robertson (3)	40,638	0–7	L7
8	April 13	White Sox	0–3	Rodon (1–1)	**Hughes** (0–2)	Robertson (4)	21,008	0–8	L8
9	April 14	White Sox	1–3	Latos (2–0)	**Santana** (0–1)	Robertson (5)	19,736	0–9	L9
10	April 15	Angels	5–4	**Fien** (1–0)	Salas (0–1)	**Jepsen** (1)	22,461	1–9	W1
11	April 16	Angels	6–4	**Pressly** (1–0)	Smith (0–1)	**Jepsen** (2)	27,464	2–9	W2
12	April 17	Angels	3–2 (12)	**Tonkin** (1–0)	Rasmus (0–1)	—	25,932	3–9	W3
13	April 18	Brewers	7–4 (6)	**Hughes** (1–2)	Anderson (1–1)	—	21,078	4–9	W4
14	April 19	Brewers	5–6	Thornburg (2–0)	**Jepsen** (0–3)	Jeffress (5)	17,597	4–10	L1
15	April 20	@ Brewers	5–10	Nelson (3–1)	**Pressly** (1–1)	—	21,087	4–11	L2
16	April 21	@ Brewers	8–1	**Nolasco** (1–0)	Jungmann (0–3)	—	30,107	5–11	W1
17	April 22	@ Nationals	4–8	González (1–0)	**Gibson** (0–3)	—	27,684	5–12	L1
18	April 23	@ Nationals	0–2	Roark (2–2)	**Hughes** (1–3)	Papelbon (7)	35,974	5–13	L2
19	April 24	@ Nationals	5–6 (16)	Pérez (1–0)	**Tonkin** (1–1)	—	35,397	5–14	L3
20	April 25	Indians	4–3	**Jepsen** (1–3)	McAllister (1–1)	—	17,503	6–14	W1
21	April 26	Indians	6–5	**Jepsen** (2–3)	Allen (0–2)	—	17,493	7–14	W2
22	April 27	Indians	5–6	Tomlin (3–0)	**Berríos** (0–1)	Allen (7)	17,746	7–15	L1
23	April 29	Tigers	2–9	Fulmer (1–0)	**Hughes** (1–4)	—	23,049	7–16	L2
24	April 30	Tigers	1–4	Zimmermann (5–0)	**Duffey** (0–1)	Rodríguez (6)	31,109	7–17	L3

May: 8–19 (Home: 2–8; Away: 6–11)

#	Date	Opponent	Score	Win	Loss	Save	Attendance	Record	Streak
25	May 1	Tigers	5–6	Lowe (1–0)	**Pressly** (1–2)	Rodríguez (7)	24,749	7–18	L4
26	May 2	@ Astros	6–2	**Berríos** (1–1)	Keuchel (2–4)	—	18,243	8–18	W1
27	May 3	@ Astros	4–6	McHugh (3–3)	**Meyer** (0–1)	Gregerson (6)	21,153	8–19	L1
28	May 4	@ Astros	4–16	Feldman (1–2)	**Hughes** (1–5)	—	20,847	8–20	L2
29	May 6	@ White Sox	4–10	Latos (5–0)	**Nolasco** (1–1)	—	23,054	8–21	L3
30	May 7	@ White Sox	2–7	Sale (7–0)	**Santana** (0–2)	—	28,049	8–22	L4
31	May 8	@ White Sox	1–3	Quintana (5–1)	**Duffey** (0–2)	Robertson (10)	23,801	8–23	L5
—	May 9	Orioles	Postponed (rain). Make-up date July 28.						
32	May 10	Orioles	3–5	O'Day (2–0)	**Jepsen** (2–4)	Britton (8)	21,586	8–24	L6
33	May 11	Orioles	2–9	Wilson (2–1)	**Hughes** (1–6)	—	25,094	8–25	L7
34	May 13	@ Indians	6–7	McAllister (2–1)	**May** (0–2)	Allen (9)	17,803	8–26	L8
35	May 14	@ Indians	6–3	**Santana** (1–2)	Kluber (2–5)	—	15,428	9–26	W1
36	May 15	@ Indians	5–1	**Duffey** (1–2)	Bauer (3–1)	—	13,236	10–26	W2
37	May 16	@ Tigers	8–10	Zimmermann (6–2)	**Dean** (0–1)	Rodríguez (10)	25,925	10–27	L1
38	May 17	@ Tigers	2–7	Ryan (1–2)	**Tonkin** (1–2)	—	27,652	10–28	L2
39	May 18	@ Tigers	3–6	Verlander (3–4)	**Nolasco** (1–2)	Rodríguez (11)	29,035	10–29	L3
40	May 19	Blue Jays	2–3 (11)	Osuna (2–0)	**Pressly** (1–3)	Biagini (1)	25,435	10–30	L4
41	May 20	Blue Jays	3–9	Sanchez (4–1)	**Duffey** (1–3)	—	29,396	10–31	L5
42	May 21	Blue Jays	5–3	**Abad** (1–0)	Happ (5–2)	**Jepsen** (3)	30,460	11–31	W1
43	May 22	Blue Jays	1–3	Stroman (5–1)	**Hughes** (1–7)	Osuna (9)	33,421	11–32	L1
44	May 23	Royals	4–10	Moylan (1–0)	**Nolasco** (1–3)	—	17,886	11–33	L2
45	May 24	Royals	4–7	Volquez (5–4)	**Santana**	Davis (12)	23,541	11–34	L3
46	May 25	Royals	7–5	**Duffey** (2–3)	Gee (1–2)	**Jepson** (4)	27,233	12–34	W1
47	May 27	@ Mariners	7–2	**Dean** (1-1)	Hernandez (4-4)	—	40,921	13–34	W2
48	May 28	@ Mariners	6–5	**Pressly** (2–3)	Vincent (2-2)	**Jepsen** (5)	28,309	14–34	W3
49	May 29	@ Mariners	5–4	**Nolasco** (2–3)	Walker (2–5)	**Jepsen** (6)	33,748	15–34	W4
50	May 30	@ Athletics	2–3	Graveman (2–6)	**Santana** (1–4)	Madson (12)	17,248	15–35	L1
51	May 31	@ Athletics	4–7	Dull (1–0)	**Duffey** (2–0)	Axford (1)	12,767	15–36	L2

June: 10–17 (Home: 7–10; Away: 3–7)

#	Date	Opponent	Score	Win	Loss	Save	Attendance	Record	Streak
52	June 1	@ Athletics	1–5	Manaea (2–3)	**Dean** (1–2)	—	11,343	15–37	L3
53	June 2	Rays	6–4	**Rogers** (1–0)	Ramírez (6–4)	**Jepsen** (7)	20,193	16–37	W1
54	June 3	Rays	2–4	Ramírez (7–4)	**Nolasco** (2–4)	Colomé (13)	21,134	16–38	L1
55	June 4	Rays	4–7	Andriese (4–0)	**Santana** (1–5)	Colomé (14)	26,613	16–39	L2
56	June 5	Rays	5–7	Cedeño (3–1)	**Jepsen** (2–5)	Colomé (15)	25,510	16–40	L3
57	June 7	Marlins	6–4 (11)	**Boshers** (1–0)	McGowan (0–2)	—	19,020	17–40	W1
58	June 8	Marlins	7–5	**Rogers** (2–0)	Wittgren (1–1)	**Kintzler** (1)	21,527	18–40	W2
59	June 9	Marlins	3–10	Koehler (4–6)	**Santana** (1–6)	—	18,792	18–41	L1
60	June 10	Red Sox	1–8	Wright (7–4)	**Duffey** (2–5)	—	22,786	18–42	L2
61	June 11	Red Sox	4–15	Hembree (3–0)	**Gibson** (0–4)	—	28,633	18–43	L3
62	June 12	Red Sox	7–4 (10)	**Tonkin** (2–2)	Barnes (2–3)	—	26,087	19–43	W1
63	June 13	@ Angels	9–4	**Nolasco** (3–4)	Weaver (5–6)	—	36,424	20–43	W2
64	June 14	@ Angels	4–5	Chacín (3–4)	**Santana** (1–7)	Street (7)	36,272	20–44	L1
65	June 15	@ Angels	2–10	Santiago (4–4)	**Duffey** (2–6)	—	36,717	20–45	L2
66	June 16	Yankees	1–4	Sabathia (5–4)	**Gibson** (0–5)	Chapman (12)	23,751	20–46	L3
67	June 17	Yankees	2–8	Tanaka (3–2)	**Dean** (1–3)	–	23,888	20–47	L4
68	June 18	Yankees	6–7	Miller (4–0)	**Abad** (1–1)	Chapman (13)	34,368	20–48	L5
69	June 19	Yankees	7–4	**Santana** (2–7)	Eovaldi (6–4)	**Kintzler** (2)	29,553	21–48	W1
70	June 21	Phillies	14–10	**Boshers** (2–0)	Nola (5–7)	**Kintzler** (3)	25,714	22–48	W2
71	June 22	Phillies	5–6	**Rogers** (3–0)	Hernandez (1–2)	**Abad** (1)	25,032	23–48	W3
72	June 23	Phillies	3–7	Eickhoff (5–9)	**Nolasco** (3–5)	—	30,012	23–49	L1
73	June 24	@ Yankees	3–5	Tanaka (5–2)	**Milone** (0–2)	Chapman (14)	36,090	23–50	L2
74	June 25	@ Yankees	1–2	Miller (5–0)	**Pressly** (2–4)	Chapman (15)	40,075	23–51	L3
75	June 26	@ Yankees	1–7	**Duffey** (3–6)	Eovaldi (6–4)	—	38,673	24–51	W1
76	June 28	@ White Sox	4–0	**Gibson** (1–5)	Quintana (5–8)	—	22,072	25–51	W2
77	June 29	@ White Sox	6–9	Shields (3–9)	**Nolasco** (3–6)	Jones (2)	18,571	25–52	L1
78	June 30	@ White Sox	5–6	Jones (4–2)	**Abad** (1–2)	Robertson (21)	26,158	25–53	L2

July: 15–11 (Home: 8–7; Away: 7–4)

#	Date	Opponent	Score	Win	Loss	Save	Attendance	Record	Streak
79	July 1	Rangers	2–3 (10)	Bush (3–1)	**Abad** (1–3)	Dyson (17)	25,530	25–54	L3
80	July 2	Rangers	17–5	**Duffey** (4–6)	Gonzalez (0–1)	—	21,466	26–54	W1
81	July 3	Rangers	5–4	**Gibson** (2–5)	Hamels (9–2)	**Kintzler** (4)	26,942	27–54	W2
82	July 4	Athletics	1–3	Graveman (4–6)	**Nolasco** (3–7)	Madson (16)	23,100	27–55	L1
83	July 5	Athletics	11–4	**Milone** (1–2)	Manaea (3–5)	—	16,938	28–55	W1
84	July 6	Athletics	4–0	**Santana** (3–7)	Gray (3–8)	—	27,657	29–55	W2
85	July 7	@ Rangers	10–1	**Duffey** (5–6)	Gonzalez (0–2)	—	43,934	30–55	W3
86	July 8	@ Rangers	5–6	Barnette (6–3)	**Pressly** (2–5)	Dyson (18)	40,330	30–56	L1
87	July 9	@ Rangers	8–6	**Nolasco** (4–7)	Lohse (0–1)	**Kintzler** (5)	37,708	31–56	W1
88	July 10	@ Rangers	15–5	**Milone** (2–2)	Griffin (3–1)	—	31,978	32–56	W2
**87th All-Star Game in San Diego, California**
89	July 15	Indians	2–5	Carrasco (6–3)	**Santana** (3–8)	Allen (19)	27,074	32–57	L1
90	July 16	Indians	5–4 (11)	**May** (1–2)	Colón (0–1)	—	29,447	33–57	W1
91	July 17	Indians	1–6	Tomlin (10–2)	**Gibson** (2–6)	—	25,692	33–58	L1
92	July 18	@ Tigers	0–1	Boyd (1–2)	**Nolasco** (4–8)	Rodríguez (26)	29,290	33–59	L2
93	July 19	@ Tigers	6–2	**Milone** (3–2)	Sánchez (5–11)	—	32,030	34–59	W1
94	July 20	@ Tigers	4–1	**Pressly** (3–5)	Rodríguez (1–1)	**Kintzler** (6)	35,020	35–59	W2
95	July 21	@ Red Sox	2–13	Wright (12–5)	**Duffey** (5–7)		37,566	35–60	L1
96	July 22	@ Red Sox	2–1	**Gibson** (3–6)	Rodríguez (2–4)	**Kintzler** (7)	37,001	36–60	W1
97	July 23	@ Red Sox	11–9	**Pressly** (4–5)	Layne (0–1)	**Kintzler** (8)	37,600	37–60	W2
98	July 24	@ Red Sox	7–8	Porcello (13–2)	**Milone** (3–3)	Ziegler (19)	36,806	37–61	L1
99	July 26	Braves	0–2	Harrell (2–2)	**Santana** (3–9)	Johnson (3)	26,690	37–62	L2
100	July 27	Braves	7–9	Foltynewicz (4–4)	**Duffey** (5–8)	Johnson (4)	29,482	37–63	L3
101	July 28	Orioles	6–2	**Pressly** (5–5)	Despaigne (0–2)	—	22,569	38–63	W1
102	July 29	White Sox	2–1	**May** (2–2)	Jennings (4–3)	—	23,983	39–63	W2
103	July 30	White Sox	5–6 (10)	Ynoa (1–0)	**Abad** (1–4)	Robertson (25)	29,482	39–64	L1
104	July 31	White Sox	6–4	**Santana** (4–9)	Rodon (2–8)	**Pressly** (1)	29,670	40–64	W1

August: 9–20 (Home: 2–8; Away: 7–12)

#	Date	Opponent	Score	Win	Loss	Save	Attendance	Record	Streak
105	August 1	@ Indians	12–5	**Berríos** (2–1)	Salazar (11–4)	—	15,018	41–64	W2
106	August 2	@ Indians	10–6	**Pressly** (6–5)	Carrasco (7–5)	—	15,835	42–64	W3
107	August 3	@ Indians	13–5	**Duffey** (6–8)	Bauer (7–5)	—	17,176	43–64	W4
108	August 4	@ Indians	2–9	Otero (3–1)	**Santiago** (10–5)	—	19,193	43–65	L1
109	August 5	@ Rays	6–2	**Santana** (5–9)	Ramírez (7–9)	—	12,161	44–65	W1
110	August 6	@ Rays	3–7	Archer (6–15)	**Berríos** (2–2)	Colomé (27)	15,603	44–66	L1
111	August 7	@ Rays	6–3	**Gibson** (4–6)	Andriese (6–3)	**Kintzler** (9)	12,649	45–66	W1
112	August 8	Astros	3–1	**Duffey** (7–8)	McHugh (7–9)	**Kintzler** (10)	20,978	46–66	W2
113	August 9	Astros	5–7	Fiers (8–5)	**Santiago** (10–6)	Giles (2)	22,261	46–67	L1
—	August 10	Astros	**Postponed (inclement weather)** (Makeup date: August 11)						
114	August 11	Astros	7–15	Fister (11–7)	**Berríos** (2–3)	—	25,960	46–68	L2
115	August 11	Astros	2–10	Devenski (1–4)	**Milone** (3–4)	—	24,935	46–69	L3
116	August 12	Royals	3–7	Ventura (8–9)	**Gibson** (4–7)	—	24,617	46–70	L4
117	August 13	Royals	5–3	**Duffey** (8–8)	Gee (4–6)	**Kintzler** (11)	30,147	47–70	W1
118	August 14	Royals	4–11	Vólquez (9–10)	**Santiago** (10–7)	—	31,730	47–71	L1
119	August 16	@ Braves	5–3	**Santana** (6–9)	De La Cruz (0–6)	**Kintzler** (12)	17,611	48–71	W1
120	August 17	@ Braves	10–3	**Gibson** (5–7)	O'Flaherty (1–4)	—	19,304	49–71	W2
121	August 18	@ Royals	1–8	Gee (5–6)	**Duffey** (8–9)	—	30,599	49–72	L1
122	August 19	@ Royals	4–5 (11)	Wang (6–0)	**Chargois** (0–1)	—	28,463	49–73	L2
123	August 20	@ Royals	0–10	Kennedy (8–9)	**Santiago** (10–8)	—	29,263	49–74	L3
124	August 21	@ Royals	1–2	Duffy (11–1)	**Santana** (6–10)	Herrera (7)	32,996	49–75	L4
125	August 23	Tigers	3–8	Sánchez (7–12)	**Gibson** (5–8)	—	24,379	46–76	L5
126	August 24	Tigers	4–9	Boyd (5–2)	**Duffey** (8–10)	—	24,309	49–77	L6
127	August 25	Tigers	5–8	Norris (2–2)	**Berríos** (2–4)	Rodríguez (35)	26,437	49–78	L7
128	August 26	@ Blue Jays	8–15	Liriano (7–12)	**Dean** (1–4)	—	42,534	49–79	L8
129	August 27	@ Blue Jays	7–8	Grilli (5–3)	**Pressly** (6–6)	Osuna (29)	47,485	49–80	L9
130	August 28	@ Blue Jays	6–9	Feldman (7–4)	**Light** (0–1)	—	47,444	49–81	L10
131	August 29	@ Indians	0–1 (10)	McAllister (3–2)	**Kintzler** (0–1)	—	11,237	49–82	L11
132	August 30	@ Indians	4–5	Otero (4–1)	**Wimmers** (0–1)	Miller (12)	11,937	49–83	L12
133	August 31	@ Indians	4–8	Kluber (15–8)	**Dean** (1–5)	Shaw (1)	11,811	49–84	L13

September: 8–19 (Home: 5–11; Away: 3–8)

#	Date	Opponent	Score	Win	Loss	Save	Attendance	Record	Streak
134	September 1	White Sox	8–5	**Santana** (7–10)	Quintana (11–10)	**Kintzler** (13)	20,329	50–84	W1
135	September 2	White Sox	4–11	Rodon (5–8)	**Gibson** (5–9)	—	20,806	50–85	L1
136	September 3	White Sox	11–3	**Santiago** (11–8)	Shields (5–17)	—	22,274	51–85	W1
137	September 4	White Sox	11–13 (12)	Minaya (1–0)	**Dean** (1–6)	Kahnle (1)	22,595	51–86	L1
138	September 5	Royals	5–11	Kennedy (10–9)	**Berríos** (2–5)	—	20,992	51–87	L2
139	September 6	Royals	3–10	Herrera (2–4)	**Kintzler** (0–2)	—	22,194	51–88	L3
140	September 7	Royals	6–5	**Wimmers** (1–1)	Soria (4–8)	**Kintzler** (14)	17,972	52–88	W1
141	September 9	Indians	4–5	Colón (1–1)	**Duffey** (8–11)	Allen (27)	20,173	52–89	L1
142	September 10	Indians	2–1 (12)	**Chargois** (1–1)	Colón (1–2)	—	23,584	53–89	W1
143	September 11	Indians	1–7	Kluber (16–9)	**Berríos** (2–6)	—	20,301	53–90	L1
144	September 12	@ Tigers	2–4	Greene (4–4)	**Wimmers** (1–2)	Rodríguez (41)	28,093	53–91	L2
145	September 13	@ Tigers	8–1	**Gibson** (6–9)	Boyd (5–4)	—	26,393	54–91	W1
146	September 14	@ Tigers	6–9	Greene (5–4)	**Pressly** (6–7)	Rodríguez (42)	27,953	54–92	L1
147	September 15	@ Tigers	5–1	**Santiago** (12–8)	Pelfrey (4–10)	—	26,932	55-92	W1
148	September 16	@ Mets	0–3	Colón (14–7)	**Berríos** (2–7)	Familia (49)	33,338	55–93	L1
149	September 17	@ Mets	2–3 (12)	Edgin (1–0)	**O'Rourke** (0–1)	—	36,941	55–94	L2
150	September 18	@ Mets	2–3	Goeddel (2–1)	**Gibson** (6–10)	Blevins (2)	28,926	55–95	L3
151	September 20	Tigers	1–8	Matt Boyd (6–4)	**Santiago** (12–9)	—	23,395	55–96	L4
—	September 21	Tigers	Postponed (rain). Make-up date September 22.						
152	September 22	Tigers	2–9	Wilson (4–0)	**Wimmers** (1–3)	—	18,374	55–97	L5
153	September 22	Tigers	2–4	Verlander (15–8)	**Santana** (7–11)	Rodríguez (44)	21,599	55–98	L6
154	September 23	Mariners	1–10	Paxton (5–7)	**Gibson** (6–11)	—	22,683	55–99	L7
155	September 24	Mariners	3–2	**Duffey** (9–11)	Miranda (5–2)	**Kintzler** (15)	24,749	56–99	W1
156	September 25	Mariners	3–4	Walker (7–11)	**Santiago** (12–10)	Díaz (17)	22,092	56–100	L1
157	September 27	@ Royals	3–4 (11)	Pounders (2–1)	**Milone** (3–5)	—	28,435	56–101	L2
158	September 28	@ Royals	2–5	Soria (5–8)	**Rogers** (3–1)	Davis (27)	23,437	56–102	L3
159	September 29	@ Royals	7–6	**Tonkin** (3–2)	Herrera (2–6)	**Kintzler** (16)	29,566	57–102	W1
160	September 30	@ White Sox	3–7	Rodon (9–10)	**Duffey** (9–12)	—	19,007	57–103	L1

October: 2–0 (Home: 0–0; Away: 2–0)

#	Date	Opponent	Score	Win	Loss	Save	Attendance	Record	Streak
161	October 1	@ White Sox	6–0	**Santiago** (13–10)	Shields (6–19)	—	25,730	58–103	W1
162	October 2	@ White Sox	6–3	**Berríos** (3–7)	Sale (17–10)	**Kintzler** (17)	21,904	59–103	W2

Legend: = Win = Loss = Postponement
Bold = Twins team member

== Roster ==
2016 Minnesota Twins
Roster
Pitchers: 58 Fernando Abad; 58 Andrew Albers; 17 José Berríos; 62 Buddy Boshers; 60 J. T. Chargois; 64 Pat Dean; 56 Tyler Duffey; 50 Casey Fien; 44 Kyle Gibson; 62 J. R. Graham; 45 Phil Hughes; 49 Kevin Jepsen; 27 Brandon Kintzler; 53 Pat Light; 65 Trevor May; 49 Adalberto Mejía; 51 Alex Meyer; 33 Tommy Milone; 47 Ricky Nolasco; 61 Ryan O'Rourke; 15 Glen Perkins; 57 Ryan Pressly; 50 Neil Ramirez; 55 Taylor Rogers; 54 Ervin Santana; 66 Hector Santiago; 59 Michael Tonkin; 51 Alex Wimmers	Catchers: 37 Juan Centeno; 12 John Ryan Murphy; 8 Kurt Suzuki; Infielders: 30 James Beresford; 2 Brian Dozier; 5 Eduardo Escobar; 7 Joe Mauer; 9 Eduardo Núñez; 52 Byung-ho Park; 24 Trevor Plouffe; 11 Jorge Polanco; 22 Miguel Sanó; 19 Kennys Vargas	Outfielders: 31 Oswaldo Arcia; 25 Byron Buxton; 36 Robbie Grossman; 26,67 Max Kepler; 21 Darin Mastroianni; 20 Eddie Rosario; 39 Danny Santana; 32 Logan Schafer	Manager: 4 Paul Molitor; Coaches: 41 Neil Allen (pitching); 23 Tom Brunansky (hitting); 75 Nate Dammann (bullpen catcher); 40 Butch Davis (first base); 13 Gene Glynn (third base); 18 Eddie Guardado (bullpen); 63 Rudy Hernandez (assistant hitting); 66 Eric Rasmussen (assistant pitching); 76 Ben Richardson (bullpen catcher); 46 Joe Vavra (bench)

== Player stats ==
=== Batting ===
Note: G = Games played; AB = At bats; R = Runs; H = Hits; 2B = Doubles; 3B = Triples; HR = Home runs; RBI = Runs batted in; SB = Stolen bases; BB = Walks; AVG = Batting average; SLG = Slugging average

Player	G	AB	R	H	2B	3B	HR	RBI	SB	BB	AVG	SLG
Brian Dozier	155	615	104	165	35	5	42	99	18	61	.268	.546
Joe Mauer	134	494	68	129	22	4	11	49	2	79	.261	.389
Miguel Sanó	116	437	57	103	22	1	25	66	1	54	.236	.462
Max Kepler	113	396	52	93	20	2	17	63	6	42	.235	.424
Eduardo Núñez	91	371	49	110	15	1	12	47	27	15	.296	.439
Eduardo Escobar	105	352	32	83	14	2	6	37	1	21	.236	.338
Kurt Suzuki	106	345	34	89	24	1	8	49	0	18	.258	.403
Eddie Rosario	92	335	52	90	17	2	10	32	5	12	.269	.421
Robbie Grossman	99	332	49	93	19	1	11	37	2	55	.280	.443
Trevor Plouffe	84	319	35	83	13	1	12	47	1	19	.260	.420
Byron Buxton	92	298	44	67	19	6	10	38	10	23	.225	.430
Jorge Polanco	69	245	24	69	15	4	4	27	4	17	.282	.424
Danny Santana	75	233	29	56	10	2	2	14	12	12	.240	.326
Byung-ho Park	62	215	28	41	9	1	12	24	1	21	.191	.409
Juan Centeno	55	176	16	46	12	1	3	25	0	12	.261	.392
Kennys Vargas	47	152	27	35	11	0	10	20	0	24	.230	.500
Oswaldo Arcia	32	103	8	22	4	0	4	12	0	10	.214	.369
John Ryan Murphy	26	82	4	12	3	0	1	3	0	5	.146	.220
Logan Schafer	26	63	8	15	3	1	0	1	0	8	.238	.317
James Beresford	10	22	0	5	1	0	0	0	0	1	.227	.273
Darin Mastroianni	7	9	1	0	0	0	0	0	1	2	.000	.000
Pitcher totals	162	24	1	3	0	0	0	0	0	2	.125	.125
Team totals	162	5618	722	1409	288	35	200	690	91	513	.251	.421

=== Pitching ===
Note: W = Wins; L = Losses; ERA = Earned run average; G = Games pitched; GS = Games started; SV = Saves; IP = Innings pitched; H = Hits allowed; R = Runs allowed; ER = Earned runs allowed; BB = Walks allowed; SO = Strikeouts

Player	W	L	ERA	G	GS	SV	IP	H	R	ER	BB	SO
Ervin Santana	7	11	3.38	30	30	0	181.1	168	78	68	53	149
Kyle Gibson	6	11	5.07	25	25	0	147.1	175	89	83	55	104
Tyler Duffey	9	12	6.43	26	26	0	133.0	167	103	95	32	114
Ricky Nolasco	4	8	5.13	21	21	0	124.2	139	77	71	29	93
Ryan Pressly	6	7	3.70	72	0	1	75.1	79	34	31	23	67
Michael Tonkin	3	2	5.02	65	0	0	71.2	80	46	40	24	80
Tommy Milone	3	5	5.71	19	12	0	69.1	84	53	44	22	49
Pat Dean	1	6	6.28	19	9	0	67.1	88	47	47	23	50
Taylor Rogers	3	1	3.96	57	0	0	61.1	63	29	27	16	64
Hector Santiago	3	6	5.58	11	11	0	61.1	65	39	38	22	37
Phil Hughes	1	7	5.95	12	11	0	59.0	76	40	39	13	34
José Berríos	3	7	8.02	14	14	0	58.1	74	56	52	35	49
Brandon Kintzler	0	2	3.15	54	0	17	54.1	59	22	19	8	35
Trevor May	2	2	5.27	44	0	0	42.2	39	26	25	17	60
Buddy Boshers	2	0	4.25	37	0	0	36.0	35	21	17	7	37
Fernando Abad	1	4	2.65	39	0	1	34.0	27	11	10	14	29
Kevin Jepsen	2	5	6.16	33	0	7	30.2	42	22	21	12	22
Ryan O'Rourke	0	1	3.96	26	0	0	25.0	18	13	11	10	24
JT Chargois	1	1	4.70	25	0	0	23.0	25	12	12	12	17
Alex Wimmers	1	3	4.15	16	0	0	17.1	14	8	8	11	14
Andrew Albers	0	0	5.82	6	2	0	17.0	27	16	11	6	16
Neil Ramírez	0	0	6.14	8	0	0	14.2	15	10	10	10	11
Pat Light	0	1	9.00	15	0	0	14.0	15	14	14	15	14
Casey Fien	1	0	7.90	14	0	0	13.2	21	12	12	3	12
Alex Meyer	0	1	12.27	2	1	0	3.2	8	5	5	4	5
Adalberto Mejía	0	0	7.71	1	0	0	2.1	5	2	2	1	0
Glen Perkins	0	0	9.00	2	0	0	2.0	5	2	2	1	3
J.R. Graham	0	0	10.80	1	0	0	1.2	3	2	2	1	2
Eduardo Escobar	0	0	0.00	1	0	0	1.0	1	0	0	0	0
Team totals	59	103	5.08	162	162	26	1443.0	1617	889	814	479	1191

== Farm system ==
Level	Team	League	Manager
AAA	Rochester Red Wings	International League	Mike Quade
AA	Chattanooga Lookouts	Southern League	Doug Mientkiewicz
A-Advanced	Fort Myers Miracle	Florida State League	Jeff Smith
A	Cedar Rapids Kernels	Midwest League	Jake Mauer
Rookie	Elizabethton Twins	Appalachian League	Ray Smith
Rookie	GCL Twins	Gulf Coast League	Ramón Borrego
Rookie	DSL Twins	Dominican Summer League	
