= 2016 Detroit Tigers season =

Major League Baseball season

2016 Detroit Tigers
- League: American League
- Division: Central
- Ballpark: Comerica Park
- City: Detroit, Michigan
- Record: 86–75 (.534)
- Divisional place: 2nd
- Owners: Mike Ilitch
- General managers: Al Avila
- Managers: Brad Ausmus
- Television: Fox Sports Detroit (Mario Impemba, Rod Allen, Kirk Gibson, Jack Morris)
- Radio: Detroit Tigers Radio Network (Dan Dickerson, Jim Price)
- Stats: ESPN.com; Baseball Reference

The 2016 Detroit Tigers season was the team's 116th season. The Tigers opened the season on the road against the Miami Marlins on April 5, and their home opener was on April 8 against the New York Yankees. The Tigers finished the season in second place in the American League Central division, with an 86–75 record. They had a chance for a Wild Card berth until the final day of the regular season, but their 1–0 loss to the Atlanta Braves and wins by the Baltimore Orioles and Toronto Blue Jays kept the team out of the playoffs for the second consecutive season. 2016 would be the last time the Tigers would have a winning season until the 2024 season.

== Roster moves ==
=== Coaching staff ===
- On October 19, Jeff Jones announced his retirement, after spending the last five seasons as the Tigers pitching coach, and nine seasons on the Tigers' coaching staff. On October 29, Rich Dubee was hired as his successor.

=== Signings ===
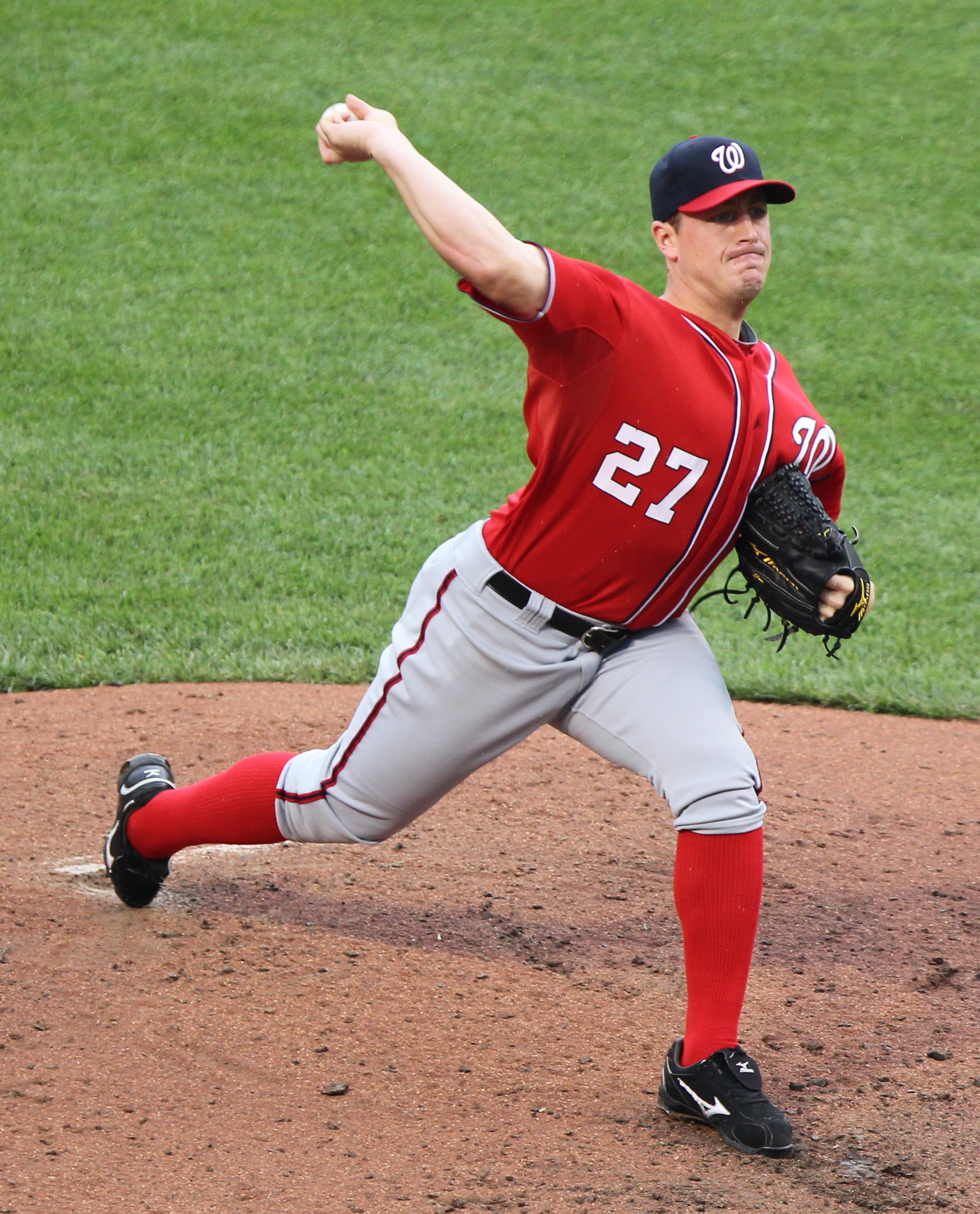
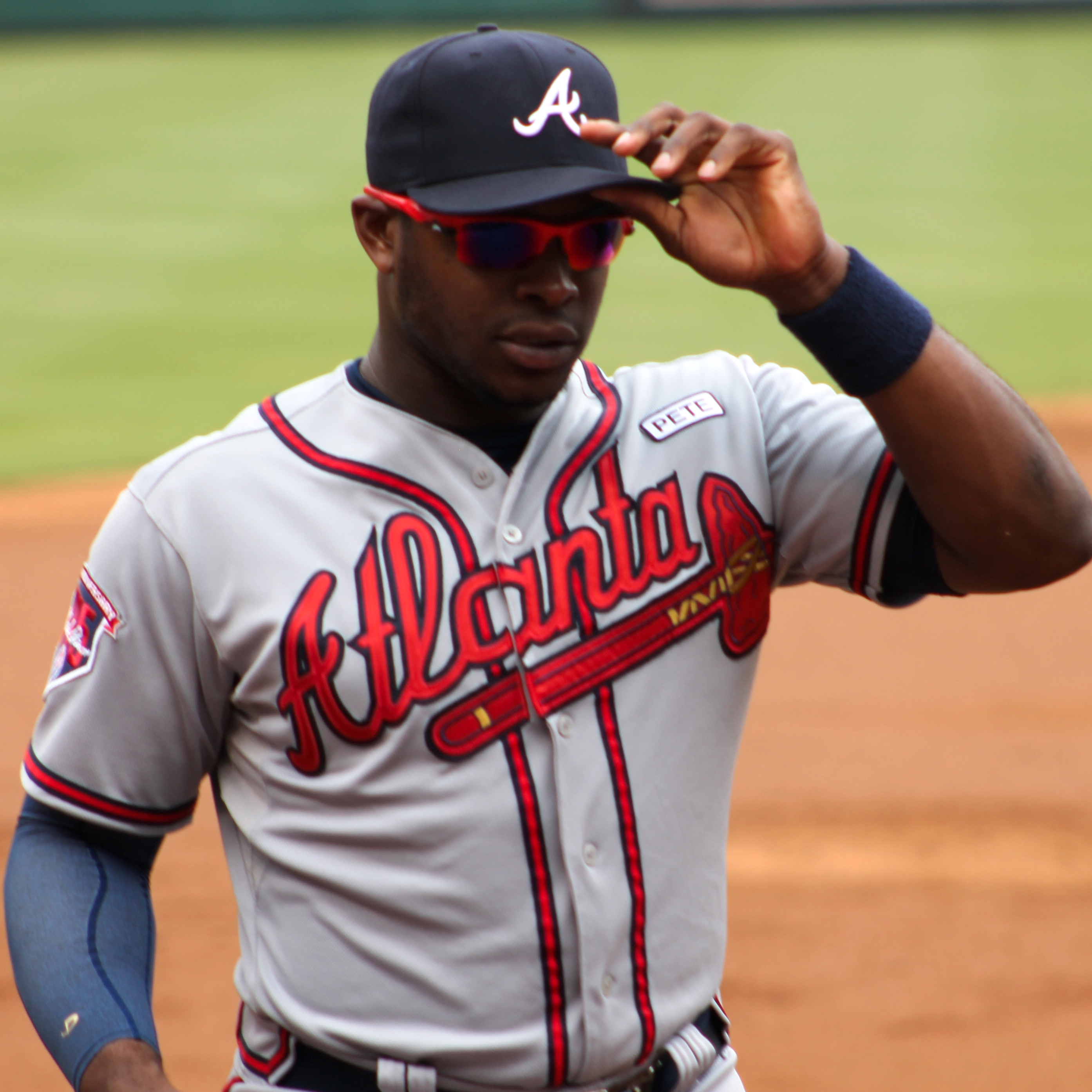
Jordan Zimmermann (left) and Justin Upton (right) were two of Detroit's free agent acquisitions.
- On November 30, the Tigers signed pitcher Jordan Zimmermann to a five-year, $110 million contract.
- On December 6, the Tigers signed pitcher Mike Pelfrey to a two-year, $16 million contract.
- Also on December 6, the Tigers signed catcher Jarrod Saltalamacchia to a one-year contract for the major league minimum salary. (The Miami Marlins were paying the bulk of Saltalamacchia's existing contract through the end of 2016.)
- On December 8, the Tigers signed pitcher Mark Lowe to a two-year, $11 million contract.
- On December 18, the Tigers signed utility player Mike Avilés to a one-year, $2 million contract.
- On January 13, the Tigers avoided arbitration with newly acquired pitcher Justin Wilson, agreeing on a one-year, $1.525 million contract.
- On January 14, the Tigers avoided arbitration with infielder Andrew Romine, agreeing on a one-year, $900,000 contract.
- On January 15, the Tigers avoided arbitration with shortstop José Iglesias, agreeing on a one-year, $2.1 million contract.
- On January 20, the Tigers signed outfielder Justin Upton to a six-year, $132.75 million contract.
- On February 8, the Tigers avoided arbitration with outfielder J. D. Martinez, agreeing on a two-year, $18.5 million contract extension.

=== Releases ===
- On November 9, relief pitcher Guido Knudson was claimed off waivers by the Pittsburgh Pirates.
- On November 25, free agent catcher Alex Avila left the Tigers and signed a one-year, $2.5 million contract with the Chicago White Sox.
- On December 2, the Tigers announced they would not tender contracts to relief pitchers Al Alburquerque and Neftalí Feliz, making them free agents. On January 6, Feliz signed a one-year, $3.9 million contract with the Pittsburgh Pirates. On January 19, Alburquerque signed a one-year, $1.1 million contract with the Los Angeles Angels of Anaheim.
- On December 17, free agent outfielder Rajai Davis left the Tigers and signed a one-year, $5.25 million contract with the Cleveland Indians.
- On March 17, free agent pitcher Alfredo Simón left the Tigers and signed a one-year, $2 million contract with the Cincinnati Reds.

=== Trades ===
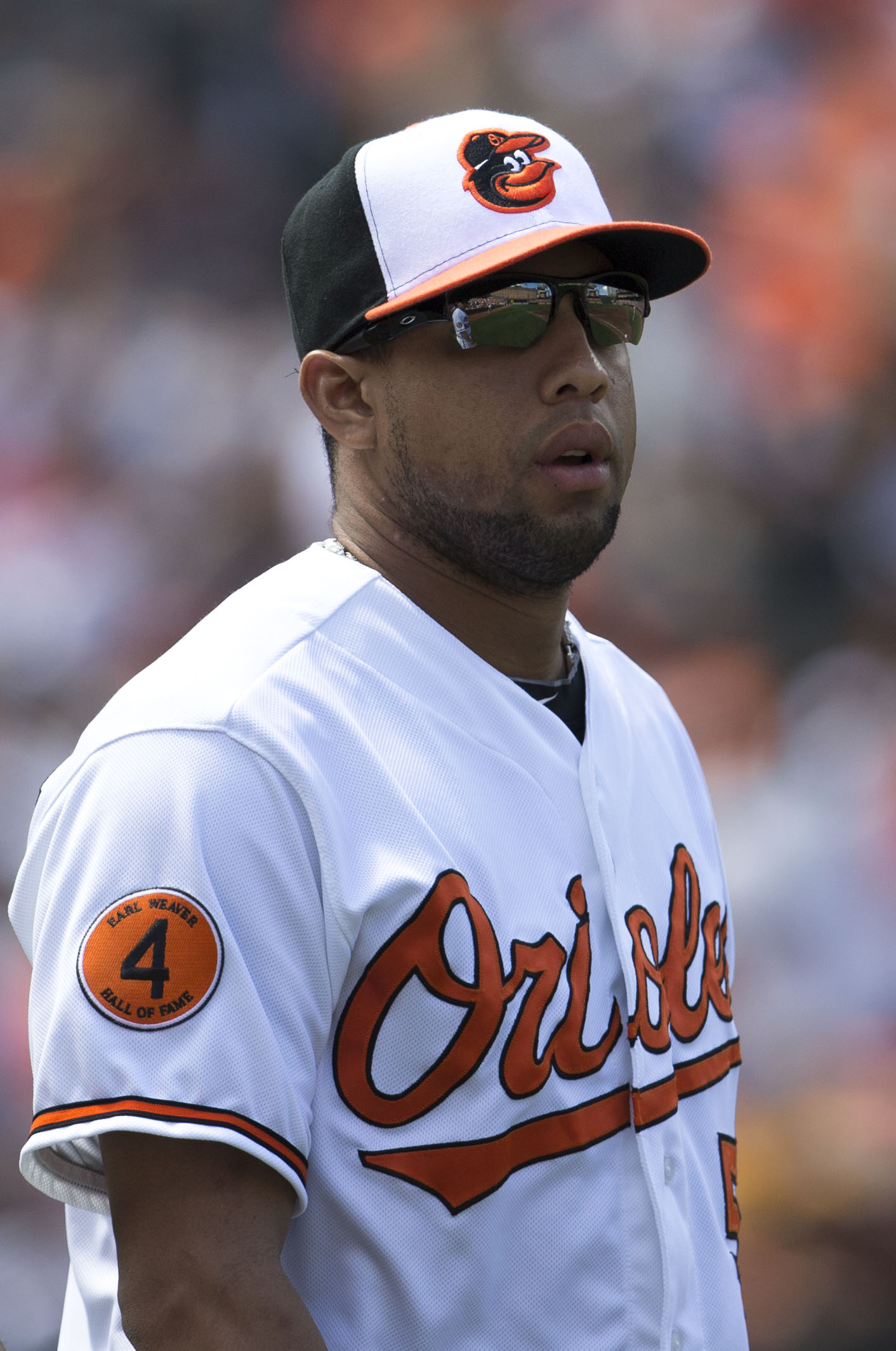
Detroit acquired Francisco Rodríguez from Milwaukee in an off–season trade.

- On November 18, the Tigers acquired closer Francisco Rodríguez from the Milwaukee Brewers in exchange for infielder Javier Betancourt and a player to be named later. The second player was revealed in December to be minor league catcher Manny Piña.
- On November 20, the Tigers traded relief pitchers Ian Krol and Gabe Speier to the Atlanta Braves in exchange for outfielder Cameron Maybin.
- On December 9, the Tigers traded pitchers Chad Green and Luis Cessa to the New York Yankees in exchange for pitcher Justin Wilson.
- On December 21, the Tigers traded pitcher Kyle Lobstein to the Pittsburgh Pirates in exchange for cash considerations.
- On January 27, the Tigers traded infielder Jefry Marté to the Los Angeles Angels of Anaheim in exchange for infielder Kody Eaves.
- On March 29, the Tigers traded catcher Bryan Holaday to the Texas Rangers in exchange for catcher Bobby Wilson and pitcher Myles Jaye.
- On May 3, the Tigers traded catcher Bobby Wilson to the Texas Rangers in exchange for pitcher Chad Bell.
- On June 7, the Tigers traded pitcher José Valdez to the Los Angeles Angels of Anaheim in exchange for cash considerations.
- On August 16, the Tigers traded utility player Mike Avilés and catcher Kade Scivicque to the Atlanta Braves in exchange for shortstop Erick Aybar.

== Standings ==
=== American League Central ===
AL Central
Team	W	L	Pct.	GB	Home	Road
Cleveland Indians	94	67	.584	—	53‍–‍28	41‍–‍39
Detroit Tigers	86	75	.534	8	45‍–‍35	41‍–‍40
Kansas City Royals	81	81	.500	13½	47‍–‍34	34‍–‍47
Chicago White Sox	78	84	.481	16½	45‍–‍36	33‍–‍48
Minnesota Twins	59	103	.364	35½	30‍–‍51	29‍–‍52

=== American League Wild Card ===
Division leaders
Team	W	L	Pct.
Texas Rangers	95	67	.586
Cleveland Indians	94	67	.584
Boston Red Sox	93	69	.574

Wild Card teams (Top 2 teams qualify for postseason)
Team	W	L	Pct.	GB
Toronto Blue Jays	89	73	.549	—
Baltimore Orioles	89	73	.549	—
Detroit Tigers	86	75	.534	2½
Seattle Mariners	86	76	.531	3
New York Yankees	84	78	.519	5
Houston Astros	84	78	.519	5
Kansas City Royals	81	81	.500	8
Chicago White Sox	78	84	.481	11
Los Angeles Angels	74	88	.457	15
Oakland Athletics	69	93	.426	20
Tampa Bay Rays	68	94	.420	21
Minnesota Twins	59	103	.364	30

=== Record vs. opponents ===
2016 American League record Source: MLB Standings Grid – 2016
Team	BAL	BOS	CWS	CLE	DET	HOU	KC	LAA	MIN	NYY	OAK	SEA	TB	TEX	TOR	NL
Baltimore	—	8–11	4–3	5–1	5–2	1–6	4–2	4–2	5–1	10–9	3–4	1–6	13–6	3–4	9–10	14–6
Boston	11–8	—	3–4	4–2	2–5	5–2	2–4	4–3	4–3	11–8	5–1	4–3	12–7	3–3	9–10	14–6
Chicago	3–4	4–3	—	8–11	7–12	3–3	5–14	2–5	12–7	3–3	5–2	4–3	4–3	4–2	5–1	9–11
Cleveland	1–5	2–4	11–8	—	14–4	3–4	14–5	6–1	10–9	2–5	4–2	3–4	5–1	2–5	4–3	13–7
Detroit	2–5	5–2	12–7	4–14	—	4–2	7–12	2–4	15–4	3–3	4–3	4–3	6–1	2–4	3–4	13–7
Houston	6–1	2–5	3–3	4–3	2–4	—	3–4	13–6	5–2	2–4	13–6	11–8	3–3	4–15	2–5	11–9
Kansas City	2–4	4–2	14–5	5–14	12–7	4–3	—	1–5	15–4	2–5	1–6	3–4	5–2	1–6	2–4	10–10
Los Angeles	2–4	3–4	5–2	1–6	4–2	6–13	5–1	—	2–4	1–6	12–7	8–11	3–4	9–10	4–3	9–11
Minnesota	1–5	3–4	7–12	9–10	4–15	2–5	4–15	4–2	—	2–5	2–4	4–2	3–4	5–2	1–6	8–12
New York	9–10	8–11	3–3	5–2	3–3	4–2	5–2	6–1	5–2	—	4–3	3–3	11–8	3–4	7–12	8–12
Oakland	4–3	1–5	2–5	2–4	3–4	6–13	6–1	7–12	4–2	3–4	—	7–12	5–2	9–10	3–3	7–13
Seattle	6–1	3–4	3–4	4–3	3–4	8–11	4–3	11–8	2–4	3–3	12–7	—	4–2	7–12	3–3	13–7
Tampa Bay	6–13	7–12	3–4	1–5	1–6	3–3	2–5	4–3	4–3	8–11	2–5	2–4	—	4–2	11–8	10–10
Texas	4–3	3–3	2–4	5–2	4–2	15–4	6–1	10–9	2–5	4–3	10–9	12–7	2–4	—	3–4	13–7
Toronto	10–9	10–9	1–5	3–4	4–3	5–2	4–2	3–4	6–1	12–7	3–3	3–3	8–11	4–3	—	13–7

== Season highlights ==
=== Team accomplishments ===
- On June 30, the Tigers erased a 7–2 deficit against the Tampa Bay Rays by scoring eight runs in the top of the ninth inning, winning the game 10–7. This marked the seventh time since 1913 that Detroit won a game after trailing by five or more runs entering the ninth inning. The eight runs were the most the Tigers have scored in the ninth inning since scoring 13 on August 8, 2001, at Texas.

=== Individual accomplishments ===
==== Hitting ====
- On April 5, Justin Verlander became the first Tigers pitcher to record a hit on Opening Day since Mickey Lolich in 1971, and the first American League pitcher to do since Milwaukee's Bill Parsons and Oakland's Ken Holtzman both singled on April 15, 1972.
- On April 6, Víctor Martínez became the first player in modern Major League history to hit a pinch-hit home run in his team's first two regular-season games of the season, and the first player to do so since at least 1914.
- On April 13, Jarrod Saltalamacchia hit his 100th career home run, with a grand slam off Arquimedes Caminero of the Pittsburgh Pirates.
- On April 20, Víctor Martínez recorded his 1,000th career RBI, becoming just the fifth Venezuelan-born player in MLB history to reach the milestone.
- On June 12, Miguel Cabrera recorded his 2,400th career hit, becoming the fifth-youngest player in Major League history to reach the milestone, at 33 years, 55 days old.
- On June 16, Víctor Martínez hit three home runs in a single game, and became the first Tigers player to hit a home run from each side of the plate in the same game since Carlos Guillén in 2009.
- On July 3, Ian Kinsler hit his 200th career home run off Danny Farquhar of the Tampa Bay Rays. Kinsler became the third active Major League player, and the 40th overall, with 200 home runs, 1,000 runs scored, 1,600 hits and 200 stolen bases.
- On July 18, Justin Upton hit his 200th career home run off Ricky Nolasco of the Minnesota Twins.
- On July 22, Miguel Cabrera recorded his 1,500th career RBI, becoming the 56th player to reach the milestone.
- On September 5, Miguel Cabrera hit his 30th home run of the season and his 300th home run as a Detroit Tiger. He joins Al Kaline (399), Norm Cash (373) and Hank Greenberg (306) as the only four players to hit 300+ home runs in a Tiger uniform.
- On September 12, Ian Kinsler recorded his seventh lead-off home run of the season, tying the Tigers' franchise record set by Curtis Granderson. Kinsler broke the tie on September 30 with his eighth leadoff homer of the season. This home run also gave Kinsler 28 for the season, tying the franchise record for second basemen set by Lou Whitaker in 1989.
- On September 18, Miguel Cabrera recorded his 2,500th career hit. Cabrera became the 100th player in Major League history to reach the milestone, just the eighth player to do so by his age-33 season, and the youngest since Hank Aaron did so in 1967.
- Miguel Cabrera won his 7th career Silver Slugger Award.

==== Pitching ====
- On April 20, Jordan Zimmermann became the first pitcher in Tigers history to begin a season with three consecutive outings of six or more scoreless innings. His 19 1/3 consecutive shutout innings mark the longest streak to begin a Tigers tenure since Doug Bair threw 19 1/3 consecutive scoreless innings after a midseason trade from St. Louis in 1983.
- Jordan Zimmermann became the sixth pitcher to finish April with five-plus wins, zero losses and a sub-1.00 ERA. He joins Fernando Valenzuela (1981), Randy Johnson (2000), Cliff Lee (2008), Zack Greinke (2009), and Ubaldo Jiménez (2010). Zimmermann's 0.55 ERA is the third-best mark for April in Tigers history. He allowed just two earned runs in 33 innings pitched. The only two Detroit pitchers with better ERAs in April were Bernie Boland with a 0.30 ERA in 1915 and John Hiller with a 0.36 ERA in 1974. Zimmermann became the first Detroit pitcher to win each of his first five starts to a season since Frank Tanana in 1988. Zimmermann was named the American League Pitcher of the Month for April.
- On May 8, Justin Verlander recorded his 1,981st strikeout, surpassing Jack Morris for the second-most strikeouts among Tigers pitchers. Verlander only trails Mickey Lolich who had 2,679 strikeouts as a Tiger from 1963 to 1975.
- On May 18, Justin Verlander recorded his 2,000th career strikeout, becoming just the second Tigers pitcher to reach the milestone, following Mickey Lolich.
- On May 24, Francisco Rodríguez recorded his 400th career save, becoming just the sixth pitcher in MLB history to reach the milestone.
- On June 6, Michael Fulmer became the first pitcher in Tigers history to pitch three consecutive scoreless outings of six innings or more while allowing three or fewer hits.
- On June 12, Michael Fulmer became just the second pitcher in Major League history to pitch four consecutive scoreless outings of six innings or more while allowing three or fewer hits, following Jake Arrieta. Fulmer extended his scoreless streak to 28 1/3 innings, the second-longest streak in franchise history by a rookie, trailing only John Hiller's 28 2/3 scoreless innings in 1967.
- On June 17, Michael Fulmer's consecutive scoreless innings streak ended at 33 1/3 innings, a new Tigers rookie record. This was the longest consecutive scoreless innings streak by a rookie pitcher in baseball since Orel Hershiser threw 32 scoreless innings in 1984, and was just short of the all-time rookie record of 35 consecutive scoreless innings set by Fernando Valenzuela in 1981.
- Justin Verlander was named the American League Pitcher of the Month for July. Verlander was 4–0 with a 1.69 ERA and a 0.89 WHIP in six July starts, holding opposing hitters to a .171 average and striking out 48 batters in 42 2/3 innings.
- On September 5, Francisco Rodríguez recorded his 425th career save, passing John Franco for fourth place on the all-time saves list.
- Justin Verlander fanned 254 batters in 2016, leading the American League in strikeouts for the fourth time in his career.
- Michael Fulmer was awarded the AL Rookie of the Year Award.

==== Defensive ====
- On May 31, James McCann committed a throwing error, ending his Major League record of 139 games to start a career at catcher without committing an error.
- On November 8, Ian Kinsler was named the AL Gold Glove Award winner at second base. It was Kinsler's first career Gold Glove Award, and the first Gold Glove won by a Tiger infielder since fellow second baseman Plácido Polanco earned the honor in 2009.

==== Other ====
- With a game time temperature of 31 °F (−1 °C), the April 9 game in Detroit against the Yankees was the coldest ever at Comerica Park.

== Game log ==
Legend
Tigers win	Tigers loss	Game postponed

2016 Game Log: 86–75 (Home: 45–35); Away: (41–40)
April: 13–10 (Home: 5–6; Away: 8–4)

#	Date	Opponent	Score	Win	Loss	Save	Attendance	Record	Streak
1	April 5	@ Marlins	8–7 (11)	VerHagen (1–0)	Breslow (0–1)	Greene (1)	36,911	1–0	W1
2	April 6	@ Marlins	7–3	Sánchez (1–0)	Fernández (0–1)	Rodríguez (1)	17,883	2–0	W2
3	April 8	Yankees	4–0	Zimmermann (1–0)	Severino (0–1)	—	45,049	3–0	W3
4	April 9	Yankees	4–8	Sabathia (1–0)	Pelfrey (0–1)	—	32,419	3–1	L1
—	April 10	Yankees	Postponed (inclement weather). Rescheduled to June 2.						
5	April 11	Pirates	4–7	Niese (1–0)	Verlander (0–1)	Melancon (3)	26,271	3–2	L2
6	April 12	Pirates	8–2	Sánchez (2–0)	Nicasio (1–1)	—	26,489	4–2	W1
7	April 13	@ Pirates	7–3	Greene (1–0)	Caminero (0–2)	—	21,175	5–2	W2
8	April 14	@ Pirates	7–4	Zimmermann (2–0)	Cole (0–2)	Rodríguez (2)	18,751	6–2	W3
9	April 15	@ Astros	0–1	Keuchel (2–1)	Pelfrey (0–2)	Gregerson (3)	30,092	6–3	L1
10	April 16	@ Astros	5–3	Verlander (1–1)	McHugh (1–2)	Rodríguez (3)	30,013	7–3	W1
11	April 17	@ Astros	4–5	Fiers (1–1)	Sánchez (2–1)	Gregerson (4)	30,657	7–4	L1
12	April 19	@ Royals	6–8	Ventura (1–0)	Greene (1–1)	Davis (6)	26,889	7–5	L2
13	April 20	@ Royals	3–2	Zimmermann (3–0)	Kennedy (2–1)	Rodríguez (4)	28,928	8–5	W1
14	April 21	@ Royals	0–4	Vólquez (3–0)	Pelfrey (0–3)	—	30,763	8–6	L1
15	April 22	Indians	1–2	Tomlin (2–0)	Verlander (1–2)	Allen (5)	25,086	8–7	L2
16	April 23	Indians	1–10	Kluber (1–3)	Sánchez (2–2)	—	31,163	8–8	L3
17	April 24	Indians	3–6	Bauer (1–0)	Greene (1–2)	Allen (6)	31,947	8–9	L4
18	April 25	Athletics	7–3	Zimmermann (4–0)	Graveman (1–2)	—	21,671	9–9	W1
19	April 26	Athletics	1–5	Hill (3–2)	Pelfrey (0–4)	—	22,256	9–10	L1
20	April 27	Athletics	9–4	Verlander (2–2)	Gray (3–2	—	22,636	10–10	W1
21	April 28	Athletics	7–3	Sánchez (3–2)	Bassitt (0–2)	Rodríguez (5)	26,200	11–10	W2
22	April 29	@ Twins	9–2	Fulmer (1–0)	Hughes (1–4)	—	23,049	12–10	W3
23	April 30	@ Twins	4–1	Zimmermann (5–0)	Duffey (0–1)	Rodríguez (6)	31,109	13–10	W4

May: 11–17 (Home: 7–5; Away: 4–12)

#	Date	Opponent	Score	Win	Loss	Save	Attendance	Record	Streak
24	May 1	@ Twins	6–5	Lowe (1–0)	Pressly (1–2)	Rodríguez (7)	24,749	14–10	W5
25	May 3	@ Indians	3–7	Tomlin (4–0)	Verlander (2–3)	—	11,022	14–11	L1
26	May 4	@ Indians	0–4	Kluber (2–3)	Sánchez (3–3)	—	8,766	14–12	L2
27	May 5	@ Indians	4–9	Bauer (2–0)	Fulmer (1–1)	—	10,350	14–13	L3
28	May 6	Rangers	1–5	Hamels (4–0)	Zimmermann (5–1)	—	28,522	14–14	L4
29	May 7	Rangers	5–10	Ranaudo (1–0)	Ryan (0–1)	Tolleson (10)	35,551	14–15	L5
30	May 8	Rangers	3–8	Wilhelmsen (2–2)	Lowe (1–1)	—	35,406	14–16	L6
31	May 9	@ Nationals	4–5	Kelley (1–0)	Lowe (1–2)	—	27,153	14–17	L7
32	May 10	@ Nationals	5–4	Fulmer (2–1)	Ross (3–2)	Rodríguez (8)	24,476	15–17	W1
33	May 11	@ Nationals	2–3	Scherzer (4–2)	Zimmermann (5–2)	—	35,695	15–18	L1
34	May 12	@ Orioles	5–7	Worley (2–0)	J. Wilson (0–1)	Britton (9)	14,918	15–19	L2
35	May 13	@ Orioles	0–1	Tillman (5–1)	Verlander (2–4)	Britton (10)	30,488	15–20	L3
36	May 14	@ Orioles	3–9	Wright (2–3)	Sánchez (3–4)	Brach (1)	32,174	15–21	L4
37	May 15	@ Orioles	6–5	Saupold (1–0)	O'Day (2–1)	Rodríguez (9)	37,890	16–21	W1
38	May 16	Twins	10–8	Zimmermann (6–2)	Dean (0–1)	Rodríguez (10)	25,925	17–21	W2
39	May 17	Twins	7–2	Ryan (1–1)	Tonkin (1–2)	—	27,652	18–21	W3
40	May 18	Twins	6–3	Verlander (3–4)	Nolasco (1–2)	Rodríguez (11)	29,035	19–21	W4
41	May 20	Rays	5–7	Andriese (3–0)	Sánchez (3–5)	Colomé (11)	30,304	19–22	L1
42	May 21	Rays	5–4	Fulmer (3–1)	Smyly (2–5)	Rodríguez (12)	32,316	20–22	W1
43	May 22	Rays	9–4	Zimmermann (7–2)	Archer (3–5)	—	34,758	21–22	W2
44	May 23	Phillies	5–4	J. Wilson (1–1)	Murray (0–1)	Rodríguez (13)	26,400	22–22	W3
45	May 24	Phillies	3–1	Verlander (4–4)	Hellickson (4–3)	Rodríguez (14)	26,531	23–22	W4
46	May 25	Phillies	5–8	Nola (4–3)	Sánchez (3–6)	Gómez (17)	31,187	23–23	L1
47	May 27	@ Athletics	4–1	Fulmer (4–1)	Manaea (1–3)	—	22,498	24–23	W1
48	May 28	@ Athletics	3–12	Hahn (2–2)	Saupold (1–1)	—	24,154	24–24	L1
49	May 29	@ Athletics	2–4	Hill (8–3)	Pelfrey (0–5)	Doolittle (3)	L2 20,522	24–25	L2
50	May 30	@ Angels	1–5	Chacín (1–1)	Verlander (4–5)	—	38,541	24–26	L3
51	May 31	@ Angels	9–11	Street (2–0)	Lowe (1–3)	—	35,125	24–27	L4

June: 17–11 (Home: 11–5; Away: 6–6)

#	Date	Opponent	Score	Win	Loss	Save	Attendance	Record	Streak
52	June 1	@ Angels	3–0	Fulmer (5–1)	Shoemaker (3–6)	Rodríguez (15)	35,053	25–27	W1
53	June 2	Yankees	4–5	Betances (2–2)	Boyd (0–1)	Chapman (8)	28,213	25–28	L1
54	June 3	White Sox	10–3	Zimmermann (8–2)	Rodon (2–5)	—	31,184	26–28	W1
55	June 4	White Sox	7–4	Pelfrey (1–5)	Sale (9–2)	Rodríguez (16)	32,916	27–28	W2
56	June 5	White Sox	5–2	Verlander (5–5)	Quintana (5–6)	Rodríguez (17)	29,086	28–28	W3
57	June 6	Blue Jays	11–0	Fulmer (6–1)	Happ (6–3)	—	29,771	29–28	W4
58	June 7	Blue Jays	3–2 (10)	J. Wilson (2–1)	Biagini (3–2)	—	30,745	30–28	W5
59	June 8	Blue Jays	2–7	Dickey (4–6)	Zimmermann (8–3)	—	36,036	30–29	L1
60	June 10	@ Yankees	0–4	Sabathia (4–4)	Pelfrey (1–6)	—	40,011	30–30	L2
61	June 11	@ Yankees	6–1	Verlander (6–5)	Tanaka (3–2)	Rodríguez (18)	38,050	31–30	W1
62	June 12	@ Yankees	4–1	Fulmer (7–1)	Pineda (3–7)	Rodríguez (19)	47,474	32–30	W2
63	June 13	@ White Sox	9–10 (12)	Duke (1–0)	Sánchez (3–7)	—	16,314	32–31	L1
64	June 14	@ White Sox	11–8	Zimmermann (9–3)	González (1–2)	—	17,403	33–31	W1
65	June 15	@ White Sox	3–5	Sale (11–2)	Pelfrey (1–7)	Robertson (16)	20,292	33–32	L1
66	June 16	@ Royals	10–4	Verlander (7–5)	Hochevar (1–1)	—	33,568	34–32	W1
67	June 17	@ Royals	3–10	Ventura (6–4)	Fulmer (7–2)	—	37,746	34–33	L1
68	June 18	@ Royals	5–16	Vólquez (7–6)	Boyd (0–2)	—	38,480	34–34	L2
69	June 19	@ Royals	1–2 (13)	Wang (4–0)	Ryan (1–2)	—	34,659	34–35	L3
70	June 20	Mariners	8–7 (12)	Sánchez (4–7)	Nuño (0–1)	—	27,670	35–35	W1
71	June 21	Mariners	4–2	Rondón (1–0)	Paxton (1–3)	Rodríguez (20)	30,150	36–35	W2
72	June 22	Mariners	5–1	Ryan (2–2)	Iwakuma (6–6)	—	31,497	37–35	W3
73	June 23	Mariners	5–4 (10)	Ryan (3–2)	Cishek (2–4)	—	35,767	38–35	W4
74	June 24	Indians	5–7	Salazar (9–3)	Zimmermann (9–4)	—	37,886	38–36	L1
75	June 25	Indians	0–6	Carrasco (3–2)	Sánchez (4–8)	—	39,028	38–37	L2
76	June 26	Indians	3–9	Tomlin (9–1)	Verlander (7–6)	—	36,502	38–38	L3
77	June 28	Marlins	7–5	Pelfrey (2–7)	Conley (4–5)	Rodríguez (21)	30,808	39–38	W1
78	June 29	Marlins	10–3	Norris (1–0)	Koehler (6–7)	—	31,760	40–38	W2
79	June 30	@ Rays	10–7	Sánchez (5–8)	Ramírez (7–7)	Rodríguez (22)	10,729	41–38	W3

July: 16–10 (Home: 6–3; Away: 10–7)

#	Date	Opponent	Score	Win	Loss	Save	Attendance	Record	Streak
80	July 1	@ Rays	10–2	Fulmer (8–2)	Smyly (2–9)	—	13,537	42–38	W4
81	July 2	@ Rays	3–2	Verlander (8–6)	Snell (1–3)	Rodríguez (23)	17,861	43–38	W5
82	July 3	@ Rays	5–1	Rondón (2–0)	Andriese (6–2)	—	13,126	44–38	W6
83	July 4	@ Indians	3–5	Manship (1–1)	Rondón (2–1)	Allen (18)	34,163	44–39	L1
84	July 5	@ Indians	1–12	Carrasco (5–2)	Sánchez (5–9)	—	19,448	44–40	L2
85	July 6	@ Indians	12–2	Fulmer (9–2)	Tomlin (9–2)	—	24,098	45–40	W1
86	July 7	@ Blue Jays	4–5	Grilli (2–0)	J. Wilson (2–2)	Osuna (18)	46,283	45–41	L1
87	July 8	@ Blue Jays	0–6	Happ (12–3)	Pelfrey (2–8)	—	43,228	45–42	L2
88	July 9	@ Blue Jays	3–2	Rondón (3–1)	Grilli (2–1)	Rodríguez (24)	47,684	46–42	W1
89	July 10	@ Blue Jays	1–6	Dickey (7–9)	Sánchez (5–10)	—	47,747	46–43	L1
2016 Major League Baseball All-Star Game
90	July 15	Royals	4–2	Verlander (9–6)	Hochevar (1–2)	Rodríguez (25)	37,447	47–43	W1
91	July 16	Royals	4–8	Duffy (5–1)	Pelfrey (2–9)	—	39,594	47–44	L1
92	July 17	Royals	4–2	Rodríguez (1–0)	Soria (3–4)	—	37,363	48–44	W1
93	July 18	Twins	1–0	Boyd (1–2)	Nolasco (4–8)	Rodríguez (26)	29,290	49–44	W2
94	July 19	Twins	2–6	Milone (3–2)	Sánchez (5–11)	—	32,030	49–45	L1
95	July 20	Twins	1–4	Pressly (3–5)	Rodríguez (1–1)	Kintzler (6)	35,020	49–46	L2
96	July 21	@ White Sox	2–1 (7)	Pelfrey (3–9)	Shields (2–5)	Greene (2)	24,938	50–46	W1
97	July 22	@ White Sox	7–5	Ryan (4–2)	Fulmer (0–1)	Rodríguez (27)	22,611	51–46	W2
98	July 24	@ White Sox	3–4	Robertson (1–2)	J. Wilson (2–3)	—	32,527	51–47	L1
99	July 24	@ White Sox	4–5	Robertson (2–2)	Rondón (3–2)	—	30,281	51–48	L2
100	July 25	@ Red Sox	4–2	Verlander (10–6)	Pomeranz (0–1)	Rodríguez (28)	37,479	52–48	W1
101	July 26	@ Red Sox	9–8	A. Wilson (1–0)	Ross (1–2)	Rodríguez (29)	38,378	53–48	W2
102	July 27	@ Red Sox	4–3	Rondón (4–2)	Ziegler (0–1)	J. Wilson (1)	37,842	54–48	W3
103	July 29	Astros	14–6	Boyd (2–2)	McHugh (7–7)	—	31,771	55–48	W4
104	July 30	Astros	3–2	Verlander (11–6)	Harris (1–2)	—	34,673	56–48	W5
105	July 31	Astros	11–0	Pelfrey (4–9)	Keuchel (6–11)	—	31,045	57–48	W6

August: 15–13 (Home: 10–9; Away: 5–4)

#	Date	Opponent	Score	Win	Loss	Save	Attendance	Record	Streak
106	August 2	White Sox	11–5	Sánchez (6–11)	Shields (3–6)	—	30,316	58–48	W7
107	August 3	White Sox	2–1	Greene (2–2)	Sale (14–5)	Rodríguez (30)	32,526	59–48	W8
108	August 4	White Sox	3–6	Quintana (9–8)	Zimmermann (9–5)	Robertson (26)	33,023	59–49	L1
109	August 5	Mets	4–3	Verlander (12–6)	Syndergaard (9–6)	Rodríguez (31)	33,032	60–49	W1
110	August 6	Mets	6–5	Boyd (3–2)	Verrett (3–7)	Rodríguez (32)	41,053	61–49	W2
111	August 7	Mets	1–3	Reed (3–2)	Rodríguez (1–2)	Familia (39)	32,074	61–50	L1
112	August 8	@ Mariners	0–3	Iwakuma (13–7)	Fulmer (9–3)	Diaz (5)	20,002	61–51	L2
113	August 9	@ Mariners	5–6 (15)	Miranda (1–0)	Rodríguez (1–3)	—	19,713	61–52	L3
114	August 10	@ Mariners	1–3	Caminero (1–0)	J. Wilson (2–4)	Vincent (2)	28,742	61–53	L4
115	August 12	@ Rangers	5–8	Darvish (3–3)	Sánchez (6–12)	Dyson (26)	31,190	61–54	L5
116	August 13	@ Rangers	2–0	Boyd (4–2)	Hamels (12–4)	Rodríguez (33)	37,792	62–54	W1
117	August 14	@ Rangers	7–0	Fulmer (10–3)	Griffin (5–2)	—	35,458	63–54	W2
118	August 15	Royals	1–3	Kennedy (7–9)	Norris (1–1)	Herrera (5)	29,803	63–55	L1
119	August 16	Royals	1–6	Duffy (10–1)	Verlander (12–7)	—	28,663	63–56	L2
120	August 17	Royals	1–4	Strahm (1–0)	Greene (2–3)	Herrera (6)	28,790	63–57	L3
121	August 18	Red Sox	4–3	J. Wilson (3–4)	Tazawa (2–2)	Rodríguez (34)	34,649	64–57	W1
122	August 19	Red Sox	2–10	Porcello (17–3)	Fulmer (10–4)	—	36,108	64–58	L1
123	August 20	Red Sox	2–3	Pomeranz (2–2)	Norris (1–2)	Kimbrel (22)	37,886	64–59	L2
124	August 21	Red Sox	10–5	Verlander (13–7)	Owens (0–1)	—	31,032	65–59	W1
125	August 23	@ Twins	8–3	Sánchez (7–12)	Gibson (5–8)	—	24,379	66–59	W2
126	August 24	@ Twins	9–4	Boyd (5–2)	Duffey (8–10)	—	24,309	67–59	W3
127	August 25	@ Twins	8–5	Norris (2–2)	Berríos (2–4)	Rodríguez (35)	26,437	68–59	W4
128	August 26	Angels	4–2	Verlander (14–7)	Nolasco (4–12)	Rodríguez (36)	31,357	69–59	W5
129	August 27	Angels	2–3	Chacín (4–6)	Fulmer (10–5)	Salas (5)	33,115	69–60	L1
130	August 28	Angels	0–5	Skaggs (2–3)	Sánchez (7–13)	—	28,220	69–61	L2
131	August 29	White Sox	4–3	J. Wilson (4–4)	Jones (5–3)	Rodríguez (37)	27,201	70–61	W1
132	August 30	White Sox	8–4	Rondón (5–2)	Albers (2–6)	—	27,121	71–61	W2
133	August 31	White Sox	4–3	Rodríguez (2–3)	Robertson (4–3)	—	32,465	72–61	W3

September: 14–12 (Home: 6–7; Away: 8–5)

#	Date	Opponent	Score	Win	Loss	Save	Attendance	Record	Streak
134	September 2	@ Royals	7–6	Rodríguez (3–3)	Davis (1–1)	—	25,008	73–61	W4
135	September 3	@ Royals	2–5	Ventura (10–9)	Fulmer (10–6)	Davis (22)	39,757	73–62	L1
136	September 4	@ Royals	6–5	Greene (3–3)	Soria (4–7)	Rodríguez (38)	34,616	74–62	W1
137	September 5	@ White Sox	5–3 (11)	A. Wilson (2–0)	Beck (1–1)	Rodríguez (39)	18,653	75–62	W2
138	September 6	@ White Sox	0–2	González (3–6)	Boyd (5–3)	Robertson (34)	15,155	75–63	L1
139	September 7	@ White Sox	4–7	Beck (2–1)	Greene (3–4)	Robertson (35)	13,078	75–64	L2
140	September 9	Orioles	4–3	A. Wilson (3–0)	Brach (8–3)	Rodríguez (40)	32,140	76–64	W1
141	September 10	Orioles	3–11	Jiménez (7–11)	Zimmermann (9–6)	—	36,634	76–65	L1
142	September 11	Orioles	1–3	Tillman (16–5)	Verlander (14–8)	Britton (41)	33,069	76–66	L2
143	September 12	Twins	4–2	Greene (4–4)	Wimmers (1–2)	Rodríguez (41)	28,093	77–66	W1
144	September 13	Twins	1–8	Gibson (6–9)	Boyd (5–4)	—	26,393	77–67	L1
145	September 14	Twins	9–6	Greene (5–4)	Pressly (6–7)	Rodríguez (42)	27,953	78–67	W1
146	September 15	Twins	1–5	Santiago (12–8)	Pelfrey (4–10)	—	26,932	78–68	L1
147	September 16	@ Indians	4–11	Kluber (17–9)	Fulmer (10–7)	—	29,137	78–69	L2
148	September 17	@ Indians	0–1 (10)	Miller (8–1)	J. Wilson (4–5)	—	26,654	78–70	L3
149	September 18	@ Indians	9–5	Norris (3–2)	Bauer (11–8)	Rodríguez (43)	21,382	79–70	W1
150	September 20	@ Twins	8–1	Boyd (6–4)	Santiago (12–9)	—	23,395	80–70	W2
—	September 21	@ Twins	Postponed (rain). Rescheduled to September 22.						
151	September 22	@ Twins	9–2	A. Wilson (4–0)	Wimmers (1–3)	—	18,374	81–70	W3
152	September 22	@ Twins	4–2	Verlander (15–8)	Santana (7–11)	Rodríguez (44)	21,599	82–70	W4
153	September 23	Royals	8–3	Fulmer (11–7)	Duffy (12–3)	—	29,480	83–70	W5
154	September 24	Royals	4–7	Davis (2–1)	Rodríguez (3–4)	Herrera (12)	31,721	83–71	L1
155	September 25	Royals	9–12	Gee (8–9)	Boyd (6–5)	Davis (26)	33,375	83–72	L2
156	September 26	Indians	4–7	Miller (10–1)	Farmer (0–1)	Allen (30)	24,984	83–73	L3
157	September 27	Indians	12–0	Verlander (16–8)	Clevinger (2–3)	—	25,696	84–73	W1
158	September 28	Indians	6–3 (5)	Hardy (1–0)	Colón (1–3)	—	26,934	85–73	W2
—	September 29	Indians	Cancelled (rain). Due to the Tigers being eliminated from playoff contention.						
159	September 30	@ Braves	6–2	Norris (4–2)	Wisler (7–13)	—	41,500	86–73	W3

October: 0–2 (Home: 0–0; Away: 0–2)

#	Date	Opponent	Score	Win	Loss	Save	Attendance	Record	Streak
160	October 1	@ Braves	3–5	Blair (2–7)	Zimmermann (9–7)	Johnson (19)	40,124	86–74	L1
161	October 2	@ Braves	0–1	Teherán (7–10)	Verlander (16–9)	Johnson (20)	51,220	86–75	L2

== Roster ==
2016 Detroit Tigers
Roster
Pitchers: 48 Matt Boyd; 45 Buck Farmer; 32 Michael Fulmer; 61 Shane Greene; 65 Blaine Hardy; 67 Logan Kensing; 21 Mark Lowe; 46 Joe Mantiply; 50 Dustin Molleken; 44 Daniel Norris; 36 Bobby Parnell; 37 Mike Pelfrey; 57 Francisco Rodríguez; 43 Bruce Rondón; 56 Kyle Ryan; 19 Aníbal Sánchez; 53 Warwick Saupold; 54 Drew VerHagen; 35 Justin Verlander; 30 Alex Wilson; 38 Justin Wilson; 27 Jordan Zimmermann	Catchers: 55 John Hicks; 34 James McCann; 39 Jarrod Saltalamacchia; 46 Bobby Wilson; Infielders: 15 Erick Aybar; 24 Miguel Cabrera; 9 Nick Castellanos; 1 José Iglesias; 40 JaCoby Jones; 3 Ian Kinsler; 49 Dixon Machado; 41 Víctor Martínez; 31 Casey McGehee; 17 Andrew Romine; Outfielders: 14 Mike Avilés; 18 Tyler Collins; 12 Anthony Gose; 28 J. D. Martinez; 4 Cameron Maybin; 33 Steven Moya; 14 Alex Presley; 8 Justin Upton	Manager: 7 Brad Ausmus; Coaches: 29 Mick Billmeyer (bullpen); 25 Dave Clark (third base); 52 Rich Dubee (pitching); 20 Wally Joyner (hitting); 22 Gene Lamont (bench); 59 David Newhan (assistant hitting); 13 Omar Vizquel (first base); 88 Matt Martin (defense coordinator); 98 John Murrian (bullpen catcher)

=== Player stats ===
==== Batting ====
Note: G = Games played; AB = At bats; R = Runs scored; H = Hits; 2B = Doubles; 3B = Triples; HR = Home runs; RBI = Runs batted in; AVG = Batting average; SB = Stolen bases

Player	G	AB	R	H	2B	3B	HR	RBI	AVG	SB
Mike Avilés+	68	167	17	35	5	1	1	6	.210	2
Erick Aybar+	29	80	7	20	5	0	1	8	.250	0
Miguel Cabrera	158	595	92	188	31	1	38	108	.316	0
Nick Castellanos	110	411	54	117	25	4	18	58	.285	1
Tyler Collins	56	136	14	32	2	3	4	15	.235	1
Anthony Gose	30	91	11	19	2	2	2	7	.209	0
John Hicks	1	2	1	1	1	0	0	0	.500	0
José Iglesias	137	467	57	119	26	0	4	32	.255	7
JaCoby Jones	13	28	3	6	3	0	0	2	.214	0
Ian Kinsler	153	618	117	178	29	4	28	83	.288	14
Dixon Machado	8	10	1	1	0	0	0	0	.100	0
J. D. Martinez	120	460	69	141	35	2	22	68	.307	1
Víctor Martínez	154	553	65	160	22	0	27	86	.289	0
Cameron Maybin	94	349	65	110	14	5	4	43	.315	15
James McCann	105	344	31	76	9	1	12	48	.221	0
Casey McGehee	30	92	4	21	1	0	0	1	.228	0
Steven Moya	31	94	9	24	4	2	5	11	.255	0
Alex Presley+	3	5	0	1	0	0	0	0	.200	0
Andrew Romine	108	174	21	41	5	2	2	16	.236	8
Jarrod Saltalamacchia	92	246	30	42	5	1	12	38	.171	0
Justin Upton	153	570	81	140	28	2	31	87	.246	9
Bobby Wilson+	5	13	0	2	0	0	0	2	.154	0
Pitcher totals	161	21	1	2	0	0	0	0	.095	0
Team totals	161	5526	750	1476	252	30	211	719	.267	58

+Totals with Tigers only.

==== Pitching ====
Note: W = Wins; L = Losses; ERA = Earned run average; G = Games pitched; GS = Games started; SV = Saves; IP = Innings pitched; R = Runs allowed; ER = Earned runs allowed; BB = Walks allowed; K = Strikeouts

==== Starters ====
Player	W	L	ERA	G	GS	SV	IP	R	ER	BB	K
Matt Boyd	6	5	4.53	20	18	0	97 1/3	51	49	29	82
Michael Fulmer	11	7	3.06	26	26	0	159	57	54	42	132
Daniel Norris	4	2	3.38	14	13	0	69 1/3	30	26	22	71
Mike Pelfrey	4	10	5.07	24	22	0	119	76	67	46	56
Aníbal Sánchez	7	13	5.87	35	26	0	153 1/3	108	100	53	135
Justin Verlander	16	9	3.04	34	34	0	227 2/3	81	77	57	254
Jordan Zimmermann	9	7	4.87	19	18	0	105 1/3	63	57	26	66

==== Bullpen ====
Note: W = Wins; L = Losses; ERA = Earned run average; G = Games pitched; GS = Games started; SV = Saves; IP = Innings pitched; R = Runs allowed; ER = Earned runs allowed; BB = Walks allowed; K = Strikeouts

Player	W	L	ERA	G	GS	SV	IP	R	ER	BB	K
Buck Farmer	0	1	4.60	14	1	0	29 1/3	15	15	20	27
Shane Greene	5	4	5.82	50	3	2	60 1/3	39	39	22	59
Blaine Hardy	1	0	3.51	21	0	0	25 2/3	11	10	12	20
Logan Kensing	0	0	1.93	3	0	0	4 2/3	1	1	2	1
Mark Lowe	1	3	7.11	54	0	0	49 1/3	41	39	21	49
Joe Mantiply	0	0	16.88	5	0	0	2 2/3	5	5	2	2
Dustin Molleken	0	0	4.32	4	0	0	8 1/3	4	4	5	8
Bobby Parnell	0	0	6.75	6	0	0	5 1/3	4	4	5	4
Francisco Rodríguez	3	4	3.24	61	0	44	58 1/3	24	21	21	52
Andrew Romine	0	0	0.00	1	0	0	2/3	0	0	2	0
Bruce Rondón	5	2	2.97	37	0	0	36 1/3	12	12	12	45
Kyle Ryan	4	2	3.07	56	0	0	55 2/3	21	19	15	35
Warwick Saupold	1	1	7.45	6	0	0	9 2/3	8	8	3	10
Drew VerHagen	1	0	7.11	19	0	0	19	15	15	7	10
Alex Wilson	4	0	2.96	62	0	0	73	26	24	21	49
Justin Wilson	4	5	4.14	66	0	0	58 2/3	29	27	17	65
Team Pitching Totals	86	75	4.24	161	161	47	1428	721	672	462	1232

== Farm system ==
Level	Team	League	Manager
AAA	Toledo Mud Hens	International League	Lloyd McClendon
AA	Erie SeaWolves	Eastern League	Lance Parrish
A-Advanced	Lakeland Flying Tigers	Florida State League	Dave Huppert
A	West Michigan Whitecaps	Midwest League	Andrew Graham
A-Short Season	Connecticut Tigers	New York–Penn League	Mike Rabelo
Rookie	GCL Tigers East	Gulf Coast League	Rafael Gil
Rookie	GCL Tigers West	Gulf Coast League	Rafael Martínez
