= Ryan O'Rourke =

Irish baseball player (born 1988)

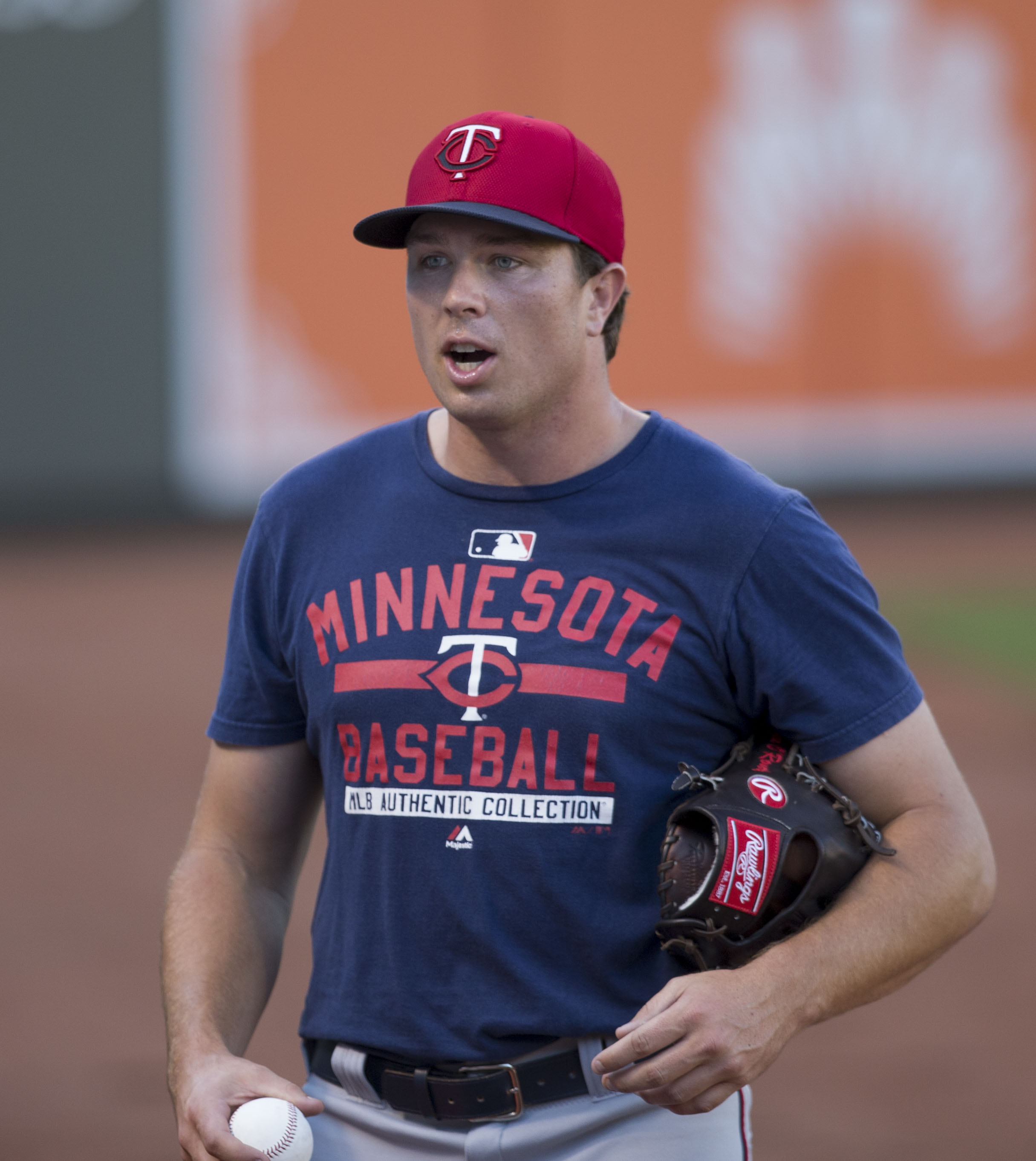
- O'Rourke with the Minnesota Twins in 2015
- Pitcher
- Born: April 30, 1988 (age 38); Worcester, Massachusetts, U.S.
- Batted: Right Threw: Left

MLB debut
- July 7, 2015, for the Minnesota Twins

Last MLB appearance
- May 4, 2019, for the New York Mets

MLB statistics
- Win–loss record: 0–1
- Earned run average: 4.84
- Strikeouts: 49
- Stats at Baseball Reference

Teams
- Minnesota Twins (2015–2016); New York Mets (2019)

Ryan Patrick O'Rourke (born April 30, 1988) is an American-born Irish college baseball coach and former professional baseball pitcher. He is the volunteer assistant and pitching coach at the College of the Holy Cross. He played college baseball at Merrimack College from 2007 to 2010. O'Rourke was drafted by the Minnesota Twins in the 13th round of the 2010 Major League Baseball draft and made his Major League Baseball (MLB) debut in 2015. He has previously played in Major League Baseball (MLB) for the Minnesota Twins and New York Mets.

== Early life ==
O'Rourke was raised in Worcester, Massachusetts and attended St. John's High School in Shrewsbury where he played on the baseball team. He graduated in 2006. His brother Colin was an All-American lacrosse player for St. John's and played lacrosse for Wagner College. After high school, he attended Merrimack College. Where he broke all of the schools pitching records. During the summer of 2008 O'Rourke played for the Brockport Riverbats in the NYCBL. His 6-1 record helped lead the Riverbats to the league championship.

== Career ==
=== Minnesota Twins ===
O'Rourke was drafted by the Minnesota Twins in the 13th round of the 2010 Major League Baseball draft out of Merrimack College. O'Rourke was called up to the majors for the first time on July 7, 2015, and made his major league debut that day in a win over the Baltimore Orioles. After numerous callups, he finished with a 6.14 ERA in 28 games, giving up 15 walks in 22 innings, for the Twins.

He began the 2016 season in the minors. He finished 0-1 with a 3.96 ERA in 26 games for the Twins. He began the 2017 season on the disabled list.

On November 6, 2017, O'Rourke was removed from the 40–man roster and sent outright to Triple–A Rochester. However, he rejected the assignment and subsequently elected free agency.

=== Baltimore Orioles ===
On November 16, 2017, O'Rourke signed a minor league contract with the Baltimore Orioles. He split the season between the rookie–level Gulf Coast League Orioles, Low–A Aberdeen IronBirds, High–A Frederick Keys, and Triple–A Norfolk Tides. In 15 appearances between the four affiliates, O'Rourke logged a cumulative 1.26 ERA with 21 strikeouts across 14 1/3 innings pitched. He elected free agency following the season on November 2.

=== New York Mets ===
On November 15, 2018, O’Rourke signed a minor league deal with the New York Mets and was invited to spring training. O’Rourke has his contract selected to the major leagues on May 1, 2019. On June 26, he was designated for assignment.

=== Minnesota Twins (second stint) ===
On August 9, 2019, O'Rourke signed a minor league contract with the Minnesota Twins organization. In 7 appearances for the Triple–A Rochester Red Wings, he compiled a 2–1 record and 4.50 ERA with 14 strikeouts over 12 innings pitched. O'Rourke elected free agency following the season on November 4.

On June 8, 2020, O’Rourke officially announced his retirement from professional baseball on Twitter.

== International career ==
In 2019, O'Rourke became a citizen of Ireland via his grandparents. In July 2019, he pitched for the Irish national baseball team during the qualifiers for the 2019 European Baseball Championship.

== Coaching career ==
On February 20, 2020, O'Rourke retired and joined the coaching staff of Holy Cross as a volunteer assistant.
