= Warwick Saupold =

Australian baseball player (born 1990)

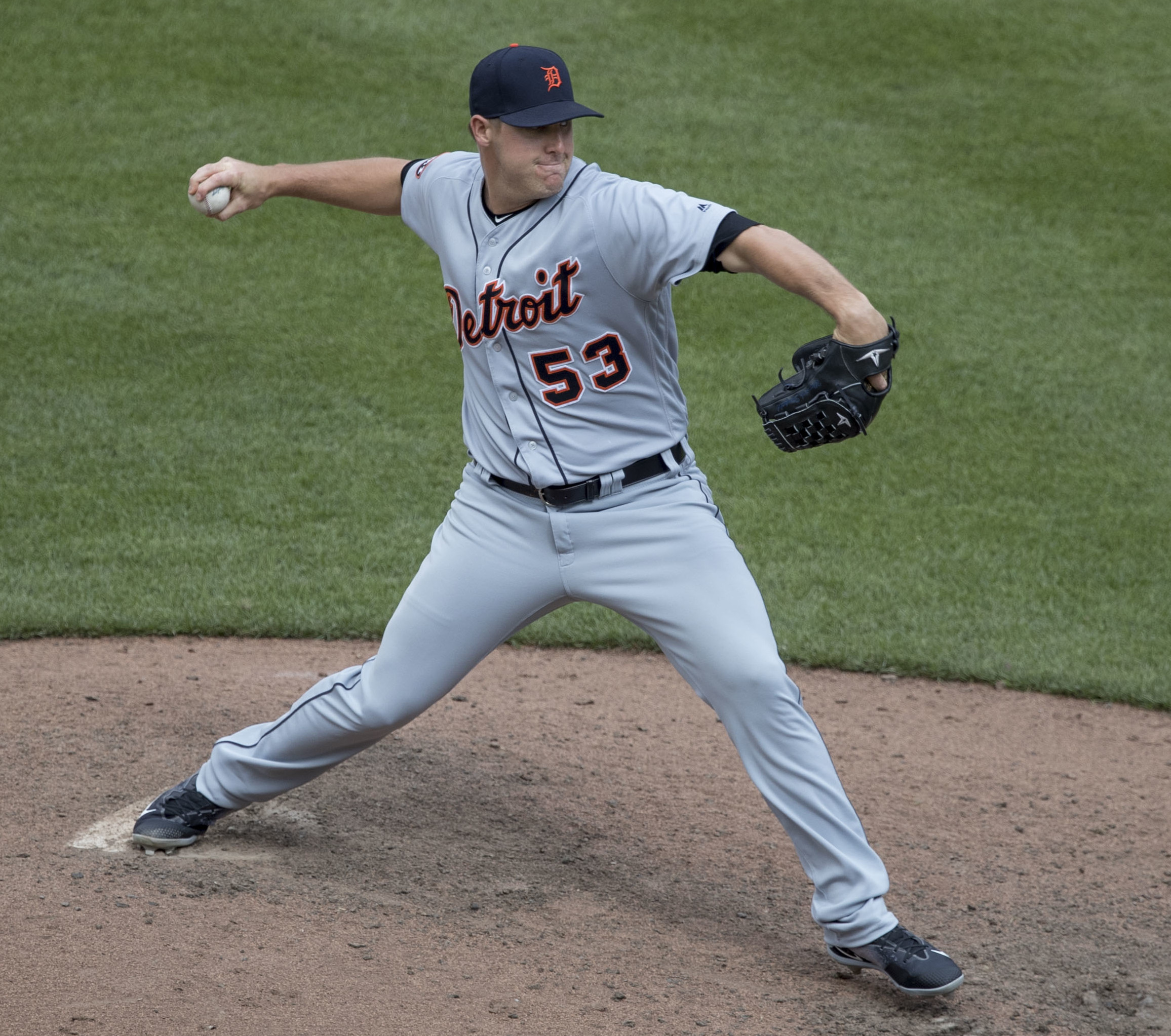
- Saupold with Detroit in 2017
- Pitcher
- Born: 16 January 1990 (age 36); Perth, Australia
- Batted: Right Threw: Right

Professional debut
- MLB: May 14, 2016, for the Detroit Tigers
- KBO: March 23, 2019, for the Hanwha Eagles

Last appearance
- MLB: July 3, 2018, for the Detroit Tigers
- KBO: October 20, 2020, for the Hanwha Eagles

MLB statistics
- Win–loss record: 8–4
- Earned run average: 4.98
- Strikeouts: 70

KBO statistics
- Win–loss record: 22–24
- Earned run average: 4.16
- Strikeouts: 232
- Stats at Baseball Reference

Teams
- Detroit Tigers (2016–2018); Hanwha Eagles (2019–2020)

Warwick Anthony Saupold (born 16 January 1990), nicknamed "Aussie", is an Australian professional baseball pitcher for the Perth Heat of the Australian Baseball League. He previously played in Major League Baseball (MLB) for the Detroit Tigers and in the KBO League for the Hanwha Eagles.

== Career ==
Saupold played for the Australian national baseball team in the 2008 World Junior Baseball Championship.

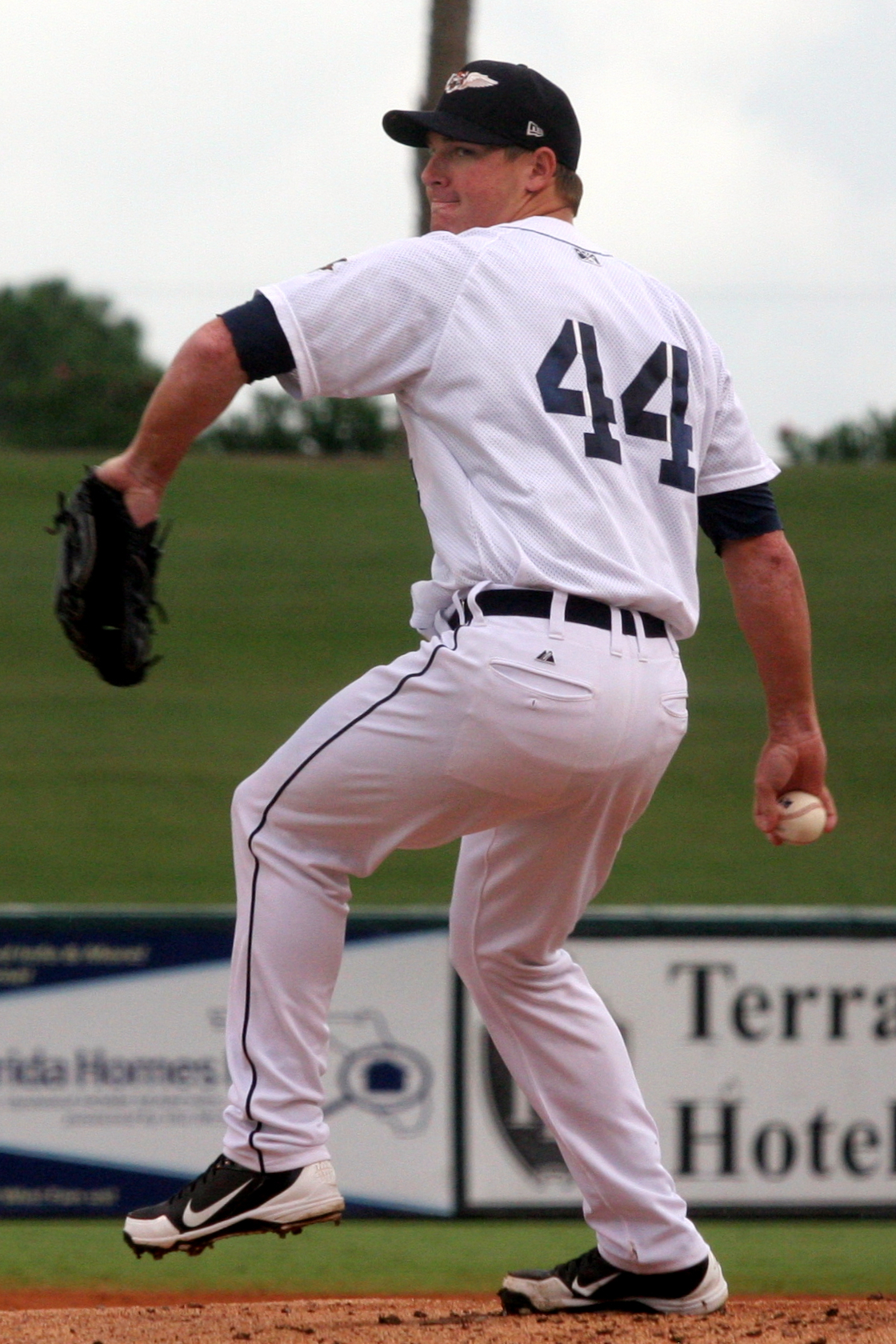
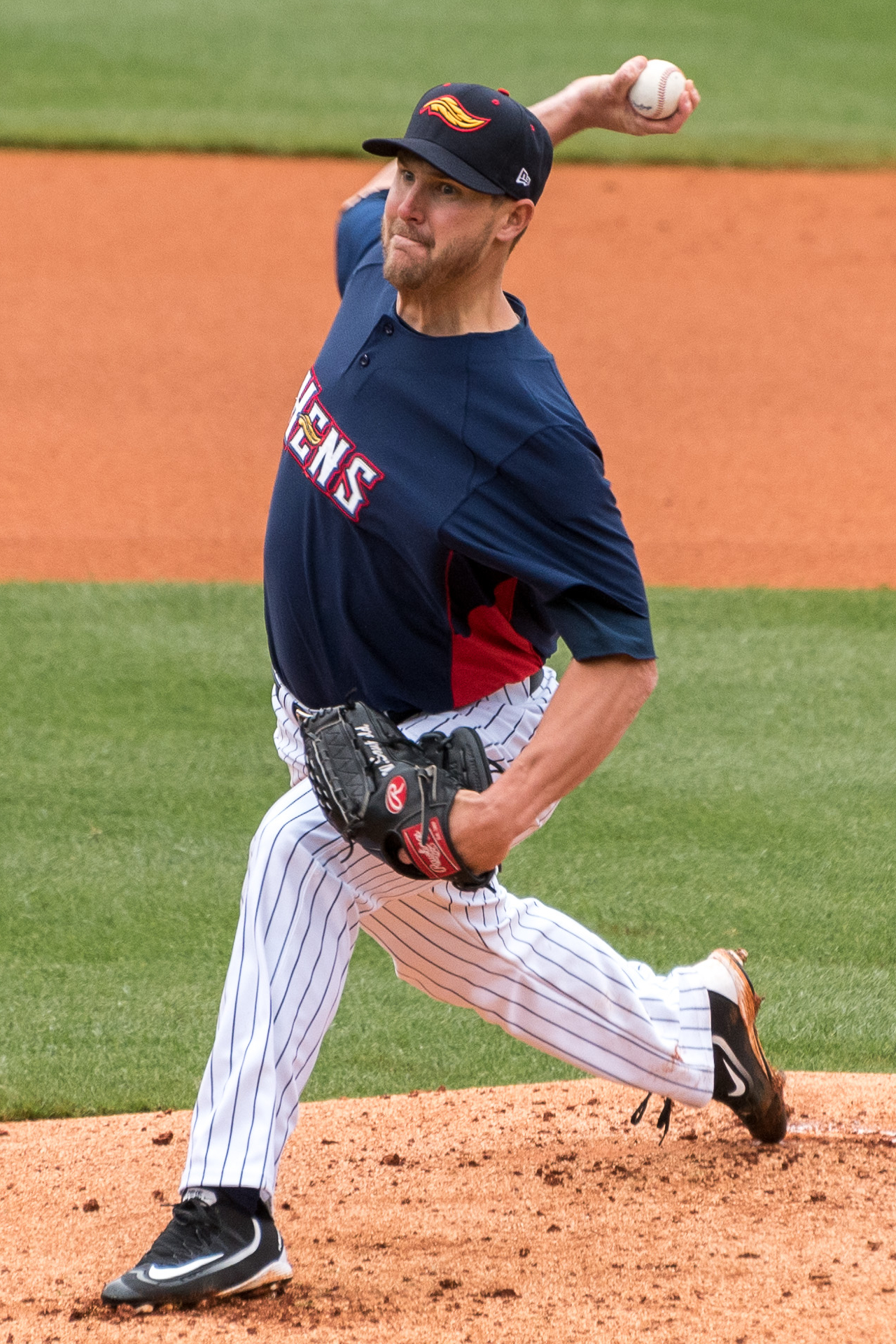
Saupold pitching for the Lakeland Flying Tigers in 2012 (left) and Toledo Mud Hens in 2016 (right)

Saupold joined the Perth Heat of the Australian Baseball League (ABL) in 2010. In the 2011–12 ABL season, Saupold led the league in innings pitched (70) and posted a 1.41 earned run average, setting an ABL record. Saupold also struck out 53 batters, allowing 43 hits, 22 base on balls, and two home runs. Saupold was invited to the 2011 Australian Baseball League All-Star Game.

=== Detroit Tigers ===
In 2012, Saupold signed a minor league contract with the Detroit Tigers. Pitching for the Lakeland Flying Tigers in the Class A-Advanced Florida State League (FSL), Saupold won the deciding game in the FSL championship series.

The Tigers promoted Saupold to the Erie SeaWolves of the Double-A Eastern League in 2013. Saupold pitched for Erie in 2014 and 2015. He set the SeaWolves' franchise strikeout record with 275 career strikeouts. During the 2015 season, he received a promotion to the Toledo Mud Hens of the Triple-A International League during the 2015 season.

==== 2016 season ====
Saupold was called up by the Detroit Tigers on 13 May 2016. Prior to being promoted, he was 3–1 with a 2.37 ERA and 14 strikeouts in 30 1/3 innings for the Toledo Mud Hens. He made his Major League debut for the Tigers the next day in a game against the Baltimore Orioles. On 15 May, Saupold pitched 2 2/3 innings of scoreless relief against the Orioles and earned his first Major League win. On 1 June 2016 Saupold was placed on the 15-day disabled list with a right groin strain. He finished with a 7.45 ERA in 9 2/3.

==== 2017 season ====
Saupold began the 2017 season with the Toledo Mud Hens. He was called up to the Tigers on 18 April 2017, but pitched in only two games before being returned to Toledo. He was recalled again on 22 May, following the demotion of Aníbal Sánchez. Saupold logged 62 2/3 innings for the 2017 Tigers, posting a 3–2 record with a 4.88 ERA and 44 strikeouts.

==== 2018 season ====
Saupold began the 2018 season in the Tigers bullpen. He was credited with his first Major League save when he pitched 2 1/3 innings to close out a win over the Kansas City Royals on 21 April 2018. He was designated for assignment on 28 July. After clearing waivers, Saupold was sent outright to Triple–A Toledo on 30 July. He elected free agency following the season on 2 November.

=== Hanwha Eagles ===
On 13 November 2018, Saupold signed with the Hanwha Eagles of the KBO League. He posted a 12–11 record with a 3.51 ERA and 135 strikeouts over 192.1 innings in 2019. He re-signed with the club for the 2020 season. In 2020, he pitched to a 10–13 record with a 4.91 ERA and 97 strikeouts over 165 innings. Saupold became a free agent following the season.

== International career ==
Saupold was selected for the Australian national baseball team at the 2013 World Baseball Classic, 2017 World Baseball Classic Qualification in 2016, and 2017 World Baseball Classic. In the 2017 World Baseball Classic, Saupold started and pitched four scoreless innings in Australia's 4-3 loss to Cuba.

== Personal life ==
On 28 August 2016, Saupold was charged with assault following an altercation outside of the Bronze Boar bar in Toledo, Ohio.
