= Kyle Ryan =

American baseball player (born 1991)

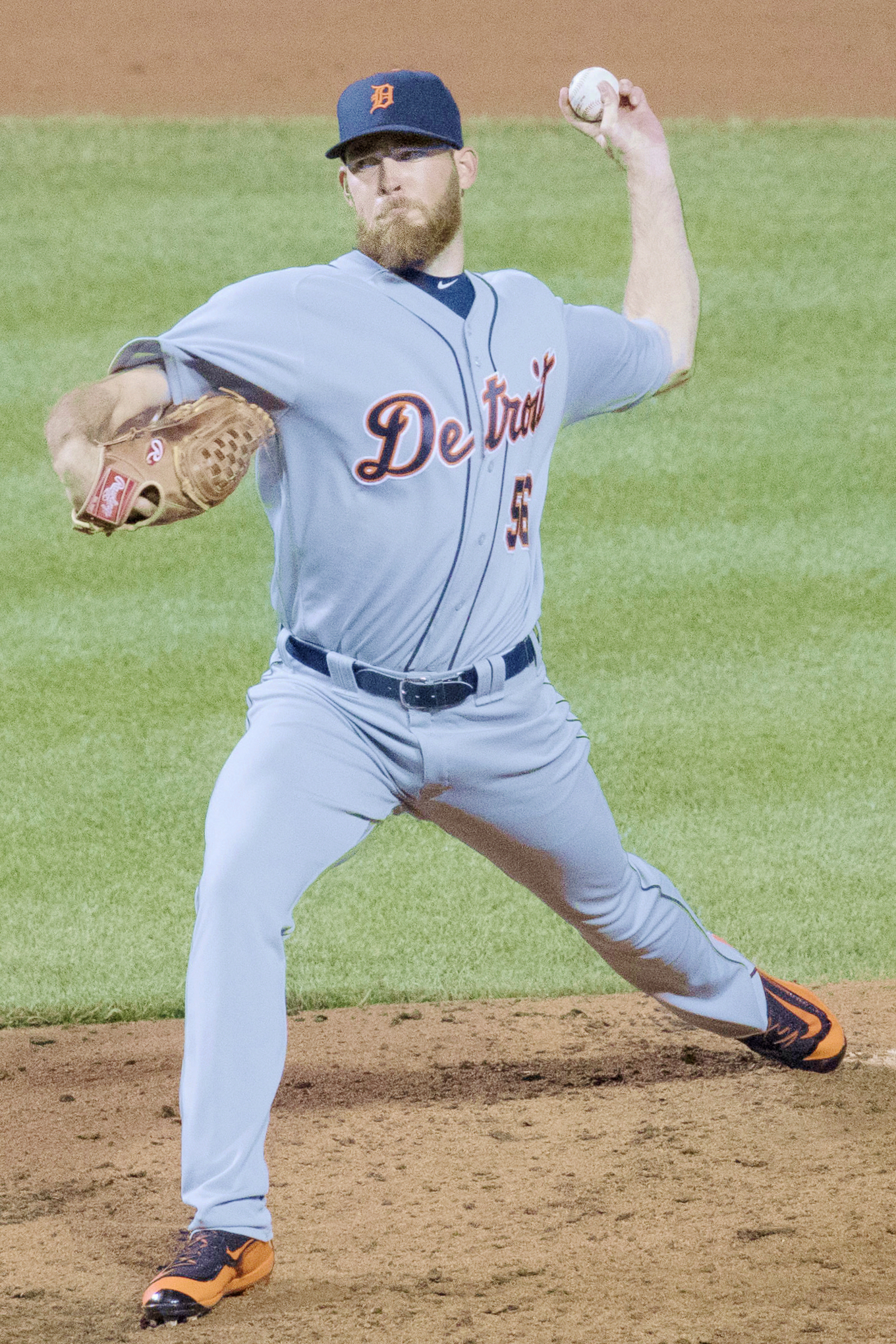
- Ryan pitching for the Detroit Tigers in 2016
- Pitcher
- Born: September 25, 1991 (age 34); Auburndale, Florida, U.S.
- Batted: Left Threw: Left

MLB debut
- August 30, 2014, for the Detroit Tigers

Last MLB appearance
- August 10, 2021, for the Chicago Cubs

MLB statistics
- Win–loss record: 13–8
- Earned run average: 4.05
- Strikeouts: 147
- Stats at Baseball Reference

Teams
- Detroit Tigers (2014–2017); Chicago Cubs (2019–2021)

Kyle Ryan (born September 25, 1991) is an American former professional baseball pitcher. He played in Major League Baseball (MLB) for the Detroit Tigers and Chicago Cubs.

== Career ==
=== Detroit Tigers ===
Ryan was drafted by the Detroit Tigers in the 12th round of the 2010 Major League Baseball draft out of Auburndale High School in Auburndale, Florida. After spending a year with the Tigers' rookie-level squad, Ryan played with the West Michigan Whitecaps for 2011 and 2012.

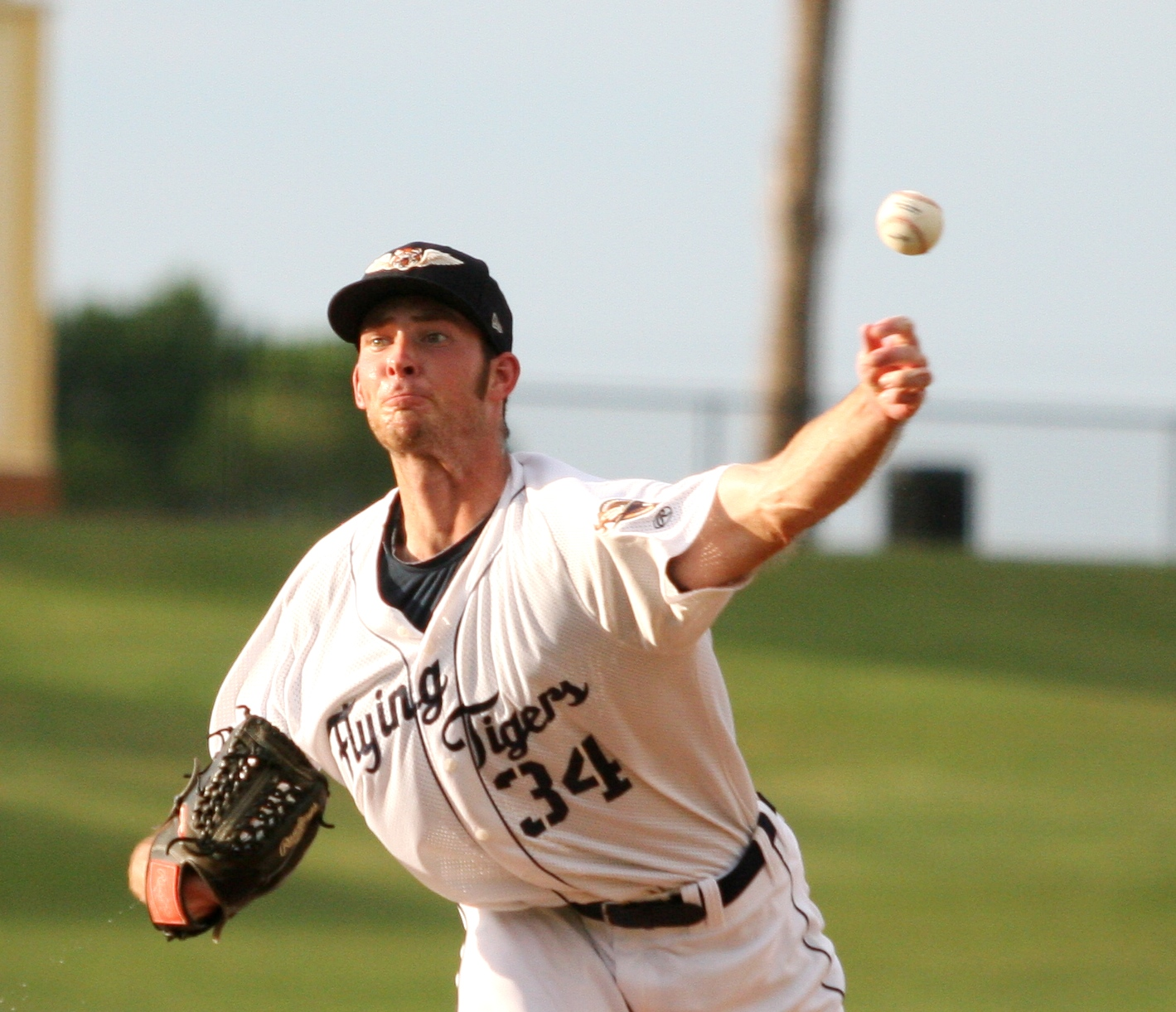
Ryan pitching for the Lakeland Flying Tigers in 2013

Ryan spent all of the 2013 season with the high Single-A Lakeland Flying Tigers, where he was 12–7 with a 3.17 earned run average (ERA) and 1.19 WHIP in 142 innings. Ryan began the 2014 season with the Double-A Erie SeaWolves, where he was 7–10 with a 4.55 ERA in 21 starts. He allowed 140 hits and 32 walks in 126 2/3 innings with 78 strikeouts. Ryan was then promoted to the Triple-A Toledo Mud Hens, where he was 3–0 with a 1.64 ERA and .184 average against in five starts, allowing 21 hits and five walks in 33 innings.

Ryan made his major league debut on August 30, 2014, in game two of a doubleheader against the Chicago White Sox. During his debut, Ryan pitched six shutout innings, allowing five hits, while walking two and recording one strikeout, in an 8–4 win. Ryan pitched in five more 2014 games, all out of the Tiger bullpen, appearing in 10 1/3 innings total.

Ryan started the 2015 season with the Triple-A Toledo Mud Hens. On May 27, Ryan was called up on short notice to start for Alfredo Simón in a road game against the Oakland Athletics. Although he didn't arrive in time to start, he appeared in relief and was credited with a win, allowing one run in three innings. Ryan made 16 appearances in the 2015 season, six as a starter, and had a 2–4 record with a 4.47 ERA.

Ryan made the Tigers out of spring training in 2016, and pitched the entire season (56 games) in long and middle relief. He went 4–2 with a 3.07 ERA and 1.13 WHIP, while striking out 35 batters in 55 2/3 innings.

On November 2, 2017, he was removed from the 40–man roster and sent outright to Triple-A Toledo. During the 2017 season, he posted a 4.96 ERA and a 1.82 WHIP in 48 games for the Mud Hens. He elected free agency following the season on November 6.

=== Chicago Cubs ===
On December 28, 2017, Ryan signed a minor league contract with the Chicago Cubs. He spent the 2018 season with the Triple-A Iowa Cubs, posting a 2.86 ERA with 61 strikeouts in 66.0 innings of work.

On April 5, 2019, the Cubs called up Ryan to shake-up their struggling bullpen. In 2019, Ryan pitched in 73 games for the Cubs, registering a 4-2 record and a 3.54 ERA with 58 strikeouts in 61.0 innings of work. In 15.2 innings across 18 games for the Cubs in 2020, Ryan pitched to a 5.17 ERA with 11 strikeouts.

After pitching to a 3.38 ERA in 3 appearances for the Cubs in 2021, Ryan was designated for assignment on May 7, 2021. He was outrighted to Triple-A Iowa on May 11. On June 20, Ryan was selected to the active roster. On August 12, Ryan was designated for assignment by the Cubs. On August 17, Ryan refused a minor league assignment and elected to become a free agent.

=== St. Louis Cardinals ===
On November 19, 2021, Ryan signed a minor league contract with the St. Louis Cardinals. He made 39 appearances out of the bullpen for the Triple-A Memphis Redbirds, he posted a 6-1 record and 4.88 ERA with 35 strikeouts and one save over 48 innings of work. On August 24, 2022, Ryan was released by the Cardinals organization.

== Pitch selection ==
Ryan is a control pitcher, featuring low walk and strikeout rates. He throws a 4-seam fastball and a sinker with similar velocities; both are in the 87-90 MPH range, topping out at about 93 MPH. He also throws a cut fastball in the mid-80s, a changeup in the low 80s, and an occasional curveball in the upper 70s.
