= Alex Wimmers =

American baseball pitcher (born 1988)

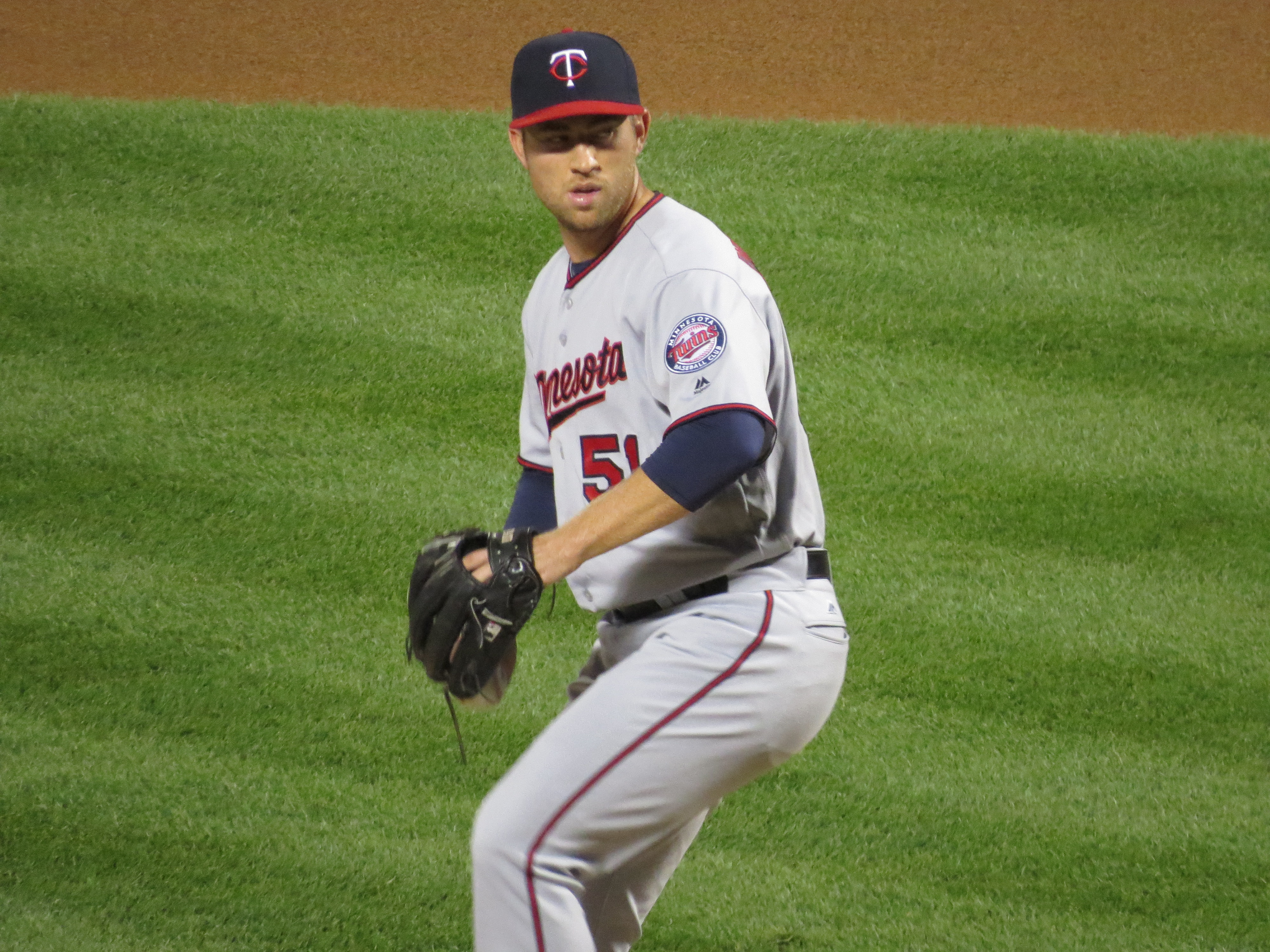
- Wimmers pitching for the Twins in 2016
- Pitcher
- Born: November 1, 1988 (age 37); Cincinnati, Ohio, U.S.
- Batted: Left Threw: Right

MLB debut
- August 26, 2016, for the Minnesota Twins

Last MLB appearance
- June 17, 2017, for the Minnesota Twins

MLB statistics
- Win–loss record: 1–3
- Earned run average: 4.38
- Strikeouts: 21
- Stats at Baseball Reference

Teams
- Minnesota Twins (2016–2017)

Alex Michael Wimmers (born November 1, 1988) is an American former professional baseball pitcher. He played in Major League Baseball (MLB) for the Minnesota Twins. He played college baseball at Ohio State.

== Career ==
=== Amateur ===
Wimmers attended Archbishop Moeller High School in Cincinnati, Ohio, and Ohio State University, where he played college baseball for the Ohio State Buckeyes baseball team. In 2009, his sophomore year, he was named an All-American. After the 2009 season, he played collegiate summer baseball with the Bourne Braves of the Cape Cod Baseball League. He won the 2010 National Pitcher of the Year Award.

=== Minnesota Twins ===
The Twins drafted Wimmers in the first round, with the 21st overall selection, of the 2010 MLB draft. He signed with the Twins, receiving a $1.332 million signing bonus.

On August 2, 2012, Wimmers underwent Tommy John surgery to repair a torn UCL. He had made one start with the New Britain Rock Cats of the Double–A Eastern League and one with the Gulf Coast League Twins of the Rookie-level Gulf Coast League. Wimmers underwent elbow surgery in October 2013, but was healthy to start the 2014 season. He pitched for the Chattanooga Lookouts of the Double–A Southern League in 2015.

Wimmers began the 2016 season with Chattanooga, and was promoted to the Rochester Red Wings of the Triple–A International League. The Twins promoted Wimmers to the major leagues for the first time on August 26, 2016. On November 7, he was removed from the 40–man roster and sent outright to Triple–A. Wimmers subsequently rejected the assignment and elected free agency.

On May 16, 2017, Wimmers re–signed with the Twins on a new minor league contract.

Wimmers began the 2017 season with Rochester. The Twins promoted him to the major leagues on June 1. On June 23, Wimmers was designated for assignment. He became a free agent at the end of the 2017 season.

=== Miami Marlins ===
Wimmers signed a minor league contract with the Miami Marlins on December 15, 2017. He was released from the organization on June 4, 2018.

=== Sugar Land Skeeters ===
On June 29, 2018, Wimmers signed with the Sugar Land Skeeters of the Atlantic League of Professional Baseball. He became a free agent following the 2018 season.
