= Joe Colón =

Puerto Rican baseball player (born 1990)

Joe Colòn
- Relief pitcher
- Born: February 18, 1990 (age 36); Caguas, Puerto Rico

MLB debut
- July 8, 2016, for the Cleveland Indians

Last MLB appearance
- September 28, 2016, for the Cleveland Indians

MLB statistics
- Win–loss record: 1–3
- Earned run average: 7.20
- Strikeouts: 10
- Stats at Baseball Reference

Teams
- Cleveland Indians (2016)
Medals
Men's baseball
Representing Puerto Rico
World Baseball Classic
Silver medal – second place	2017 Los Angeles	National team

Joseph Colón (born February 18, 1990) is a Puerto Rican former professional baseball pitcher. He played in Major League Baseball (MLB) for the Cleveland Indians.

== Career ==
=== Cleveland Indians ===
After graduating from the Puerto Rico Baseball Academy and High School, the Indians selected Colón in the 12th round of the 2009 MLB draft. He missed the 2010 season due to injury. Colón spent the next three seasons pitching for the Lake County Captains of the Single–A Midwest League and the Carolina Mudcats of the High–A Carolina League. He reached the Akron RubberDucks of the Double–A Eastern League in 2014.

In 2015, the Indians converted Colón from a starting pitcher into a relief pitcher. He spent the year with Akron and the Columbus Clippers of the Triple–A International League, logging a cumulative 3-0 record and 3.14 ERA with 47 strikeouts across 48 2/3 innings pitched. A minor league free agent after the 2015 season, the Indians re-signed Colón to a minor league contract that included a non-roster invitation to spring training on November 7, 2015. That offseason, Minor League Baseball announced Colón failed a test for a "drug of abuse" for the second time, and would be suspended for the first 50 games of the 2016 season.

On July 2, 2016, the Indians added Colón to their 40-man roster and subsequently optioned him to Triple-A Columbus. The Indians promoted him to the major leagues for the first time on July 7. In 11 appearances for Cleveland during his rookie campaign, Colón struggled to a 1-3 record and 7.20 ERA with 10 strikeouts over 10 innings of work.

On May 3, 2017, Colón was recalled to Cleveland's active roster following an injury to Corey Kluber. However, he did not appear for the team and was optioned back to Triple-A Columbus on May 7. On July 1, Colón was suspended for the remainder of the season after testing positive for a banned substance. In 28 appearances for Triple-A Columbus, he recorded a 4.13 ERA with 34 strikeouts and six saves across 32 2/3 innings pitched. Colón was designated for assignment by the Indians on October 2. He cleared waivers and was sent outright to Triple-A Columbus on October 6. He elected free agency following the season on November 6.

=== Bravos de León ===
On February 19, 2018, Colón signed a minor league contract with the St. Louis Cardinals. He was released prior to the start of the season on March 28.

On June 22, 2018, Colón signed with the Bravos de León of the Mexican League. In 24 appearances for León, he compiled a 1-0 record and 2.36 ERA with 25 strikeouts and 12 saves across 26 2/3 innings pitched. Colón became a free agent after the season.

== See also ==
- List of Major League Baseball players from Puerto Rico
- List of Major League Baseball players suspended for performance-enhancing drugs
