= Tyler Duffey =

American baseball player (born 1990)

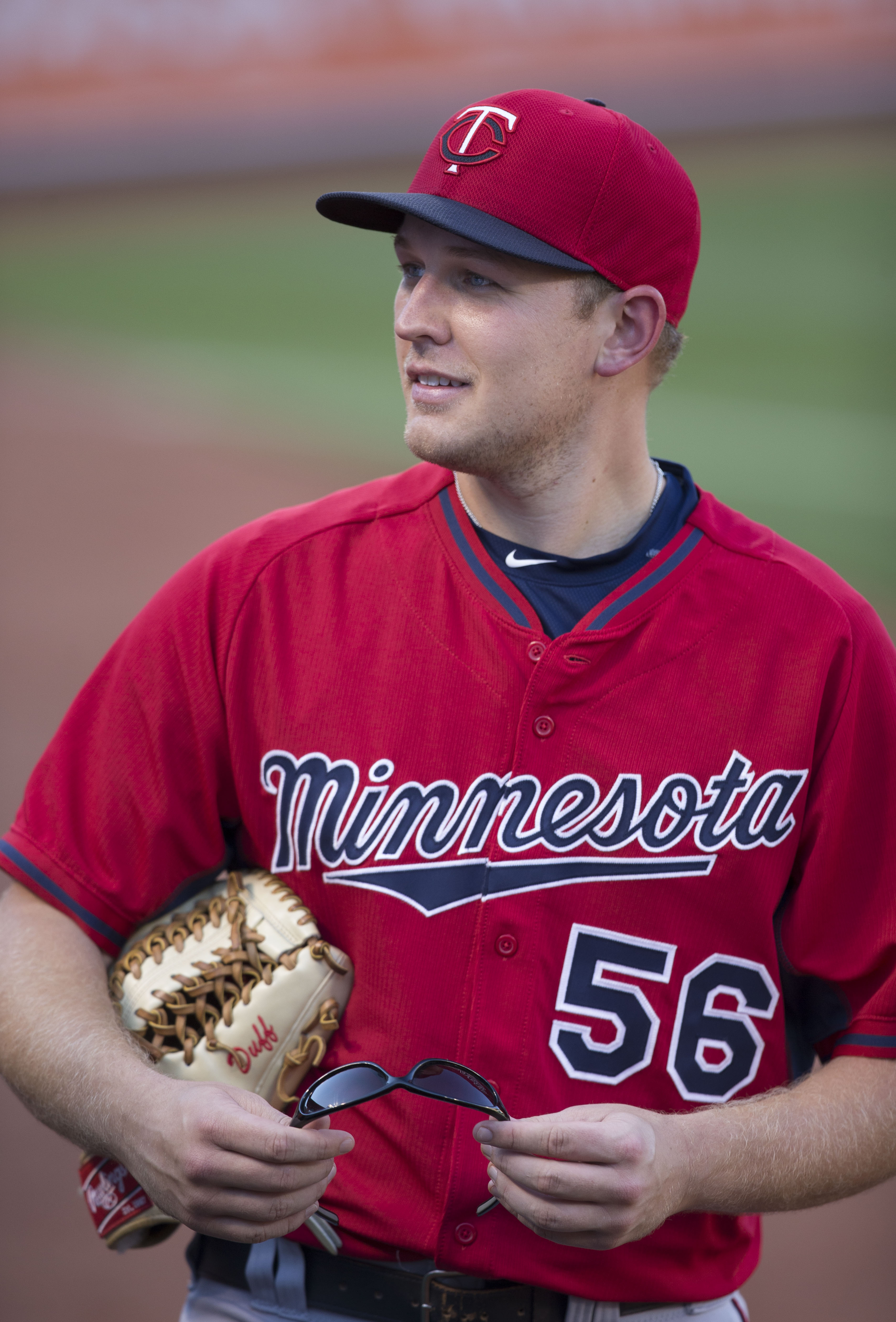
- Duffey with the Twins in 2015

Free agent
- Pitcher
- Born: December 27, 1990 (age 35); Houston, Texas, U.S.
- Bats: Right Throws: Right

MLB debut
- August 5, 2015, for the Minnesota Twins

MLB statistics (through 2024 season)
- Win–loss record: 30–27
- Earned run average: 4.57
- Strikeouts: 479
- Stats at Baseball Reference

Teams
- Minnesota Twins (2015–2022); Chicago Cubs (2023); Kansas City Royals (2024)

Tyler Blinn Duffey (born December 27, 1990) is an American professional baseball pitcher who is a free agent. He has previously played in Major League Baseball (MLB) for the Minnesota Twins, Chicago Cubs, and Kansas City Royals.

== Amateur career ==
Duffey attended Bellaire High School in Bellaire, Texas. He then enrolled at Rice University to play college baseball for the Rice Owls baseball team. He was named Most Valuable Player of the 2011 Conference USA baseball tournament. After the 2011 season, he played collegiate summer baseball with the Falmouth Commodores of the Cape Cod Baseball League. In May 2012, he was named the Conference USA pitcher of the week.

== Professional career ==
=== Minnesota Twins ===
==== Minor leagues ====
The Minnesota Twins selected Duffey in the fifth round, with the 160th overall selection, of the 2012 MLB draft. He signed with the Twins and pitched for the Cedar Rapids Kernels in 2013, before receiving a promotion to the Fort Myers Miracle of the High–A Florida State League. He began the 2014 season with Fort Myers, and was promoted to the New Britain Rock Cats of the Double–A Eastern League, and then the Rochester Red Wings of the Triple–A International League.

The Twins invited Duffey to spring training as a non-roster player for 2015. He opened the season with the Chattanooga Lookouts of the Double–A Southern League, and was promoted to Rochester in May.

==== Major leagues ====
With Tommy Milone going on the disabled list, the Twins promoted Duffey to the major leagues to make his major league debut on August 5, 2015. Duffey finished the season with a 5–1 record in 10 starts for the Twins and poising himself for a rotation spot in 2016. After starting the season in Triple–A due to a logjam in the rotation, Duffey was called up on April 24. Duffey recorded his first major league hit, a sacrifice bunt, that same day in National League play against the Washington Nationals.

On June 26, 2016, Duffey took a perfect game through 5.2 innings until it was broken up by Aaron Hicks. The Twins would still win 7–1 over the Yankees. Despite his 6.43 ERA, Duffey finished the season in the rotation, leading the team in wins as he went 9–12 in 26 starts.

In 2017, Duffey was moved to the bullpen and became exclusively a relief pitcher. He appeared in 56 games and amassed a record of 2–3 with a 4.94 ERA. He made the Twins' roster in 2018 in the same role. He was sent down multiple times throughout the season to Triple–A, having appeared only in 19 games for the Twins. Duffey was converted into a reliever for the 2019 season and excelled in the role, registering an ERA of 2.50 in 58 games.

With the 2020 Minnesota Twins, Duffey appeared in 22 games, compiling a 1–1 record with 1.88 ERA and 31 strikeouts in 24.0 innings pitched.

On May 20, 2021, Duffey was suspended two games after throwing at Chicago White Sox catcher Yermín Mercedes in a game on May 18. He made 64 total appearances for Minnesota in 2021, registering a 3.18 ERA with 61 strikeouts and 3 saves in 62 1/3 innings pitched.

Duffey made 40 appearances out of the bullpen for Minnesota in 2022, logging a 4.91 ERA with 39 strikeouts and 2 saves in 44.0 innings of work. On August 5, 2022, Duffey was designated for assignment by the Twins. He was released by the Twins organization on August 7.

=== Texas Rangers ===
On August 12, 2022, Duffey signed a minor league contract with the Texas Rangers organization. He made 4 scoreless appearances for the Triple–A Round Rock Express and struck out five in five innings pitched. On August 28, Duffey opted out of his contract and became a free agent.

=== New York Yankees ===
On August 30, 2022, Duffey signed a minor league deal with the New York Yankees. He made seven appearances for the Triple-A Scranton/Wilkes-Barre RailRiders, struggling to a 10.50 ERA and 1–1 record with 8 strikeouts in 6 innings pitched. He elected free agency following the season on November 10.

=== Chicago Cubs ===
On January 27, 2023, Duffey signed a minor league contract with the Chicago Cubs organization. He made 18 appearances for the Triple-A Iowa Cubs, posting a 4-0 record and 4.43 ERA with 24 strikeouts in 22 1/3 innings pitched. On June 1, Duffey exercised the opt-out clause in his contract, giving the Cubs 48 hours to add him to their 40-man roster or grant him his release. The Cubs declined to add Duffey to their roster, and he was formally released on June 3. He re-signed with the Cubs on a new minor league contract on June 16. After posting a 3.77 ERA in 36 appearances for Iowa, the Cubs selected Duffey's contract to the major league roster on October 1. He became a free agent following the season.

=== Kansas City Royals ===
On December 7, 2023, Duffey signed a minor league contract with the Kansas City Royals. He began the 2024 season with the Triple–A Omaha Storm Chasers, logging a 3.24 ERA across 6 games. On April 22, 2024, the Royals selected Duffey's to the major league roster. In 9 games for Kansas City, Duffey compiled a 5.00 ERA with 10 strikeouts across 9 innings pitched. He was designated for assignment by the team on May 24. Duffey cleared waivers and was sent outright to Omaha on May 29. He was released by the Royals organization on August 6.

=== Caliente de Durango ===
On February 24, 2025, Duffey signed with the Caliente de Durango of the Mexican League. In 21 appearances for Durango, Duffey logged a 2-3 record and 5.75 ERA with 25 strikeouts across 20 1/3 innings pitched.

=== Toros de Tijuana ===
On June 2, 2025, Duffey was traded to the Toros de Tijuana of the Mexican League in exchange for Jimmy Cordero. In 14 appearances for Tijuana, he logged a 1-0 record and 6.00 ERA with 14 strikeouts over 12 innings of work. Duffey was released by the Toros on July 11.

=== Bravos de León ===
On July 11, 2025, Duffey signed with the Bravos de León of the Mexican League. In six relief appearances, he posted a 0–2 record with a 7.71 ERA and 10 strikeouts across 4 2/3 innings pitched. Duffey was released by León on March 2, 2026.

=== Leones de Yucatán ===
On May 16, 2026, Duffey signed with the Leones de Yucatán of the Mexican League. In two starts for the Leones, he allowed six earned runs (21.40 ERA) across 1 2/3 innings pitched. On June 11, Duffey was released by Yucatán.

== Personal life ==
Duffey's mother, Shanna, died in 2012 after complications from breast cancer led to a blood clot.

Duffey married his high school sweetheart, Sarah Hutchins, on December 19, 2015, and they had their first child, a son, in 2020.

On March 6, 2024, Duffey announced that he had recently undergone surgery to remove a cancerous mole from his left shoulder.
