= Pat Dean =

American baseball player (born 1989)

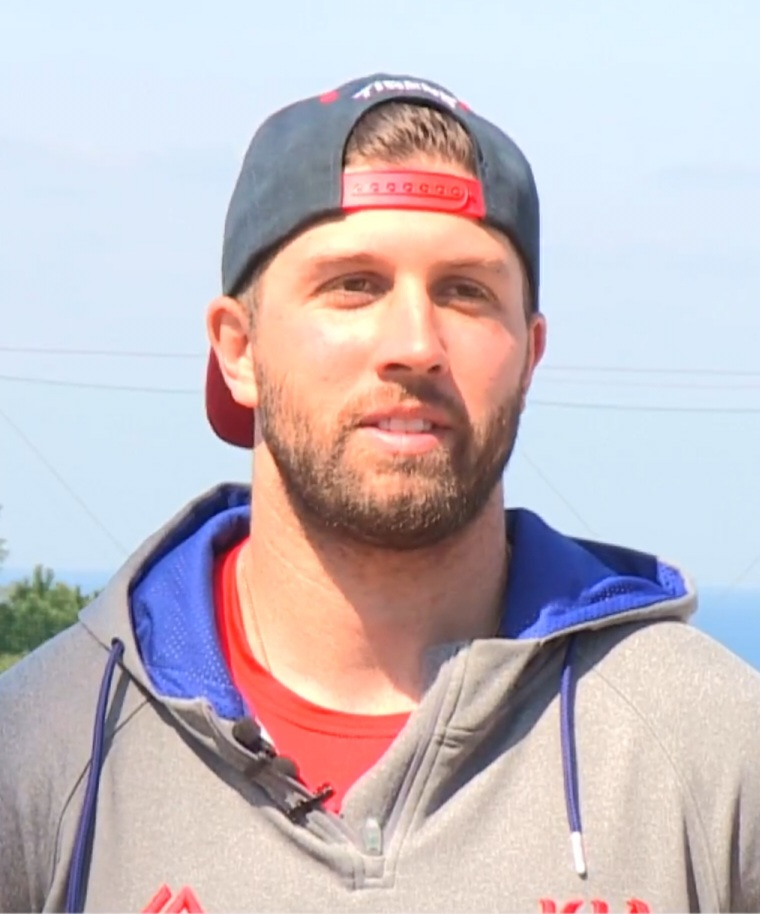
- Pitcher
- Born: May 25, 1989 (age 36); Waterbury, Connecticut, U.S.
- Batted: Left Threw: Left

Professional debut
- MLB: May 11, 2016, for the Minnesota Twins
- KBO: April 1, 2017, for the Kia Tigers

Last appearance
- MLB: September 30, 2016, for the Minnesota Twins
- KBO: October 9, 2018, for the Kia Tigers

MLB statistics
- Win–loss record: 1–6
- Earned run average: 6.28
- Strikeouts: 50

KBO statistics
- Win–loss record: 15–14
- Earned run average: 5.04
- Strikeouts: 244
- Stats at Baseball Reference

Teams
- Minnesota Twins (2016); Kia Tigers (2017–2018)

Career highlights and awards
- Korean Series champion (2017)

Patrick Michael Dean (born May 25, 1989) is an American former professional baseball pitcher. He played in Major League Baseball (MLB) for the Minnesota Twins and in the KBO League for the Kia Tigers.

== Amateur career ==
Dean was born in Waterbury, Connecticut. He played at Peter J. Foley Little League in Naugatuck, Connecticut and attended Naugatuck High School, where he was a four-year varsity letterman and a Naugatuck Valley All-League first-team and All-State first-team selection three times. In consecutive starts as a senior, he threw a no-hitter and a perfect game. Overall, he was 29–8 with 292 strikeouts in 237 2/3 innings pitched in his high school career.

From 2008 to 2010, Dean attended Boston College. He was 2–1 with a 9.00 ERA in 17 games (one start) his freshman year and 6–4 with a 3.30 earned run average (ERA) in 18 games (15 starts) his sophomore year. As a junior, he went 5–2 with a 4.75 ERA in 12 starts. His 172 career strikeouts are ninth-most in school history.

== Professional career ==
=== Minnesota Twins ===
The Minnesota Twins drafted Dean in the third round, 102nd overall, in the 2010 Major League Baseball draft, a couple selections after catcher Rob Brantly and a couple ahead of catcher J. T. Realmuto. He pitched for the Elizabethton Twins and GCL Twins in 2010, posting a 2–2 record with a 2.15 ERA in 9 games (5 starts). In 29 1/3 innings, he struck out 37 batters. In 2011, Dean was 5–7 with a 5.00 ERA in 20 starts for the Beloit Snappers, Fort Myers Miracle and New Britain Rock Cats. He earned a Player of the Week honor during the week of June 13 while with Beloit. In 2012, he was 10–8 with a 3.99 ERA in 28 starts for Fort Myers. He was a Florida State League Mid-Season All-Star that season. He led league in games started, innings pitched and hits allowed; he also led the team in wins.

Dean split 2013 between the Rock Cats and Rochester Red Wings and went 9–13 with a 4.04 ERA in 28 starts. In his first taste of Triple-A action, he was 3–2 with a 2.02 ERA in 6 starts and earned his second Player of the Week honor during the week of August 12 while with Rochester. He led the Eastern League with a 1.22 walks per nine innings ratio. He was 8–9 with a 4.81 ERA in 26 starts for New Britain in 2014, with opponents batting .320 against him. He began 2015 with Rochester. On April 20, he earned his third Player of the Week honor.

On November 15, 2015, the Twins added Dean to their 40-man roster to protect him from the Rule 5 draft. On May 7, 2016, Dean was promoted to the major leagues for the first time. He made his MLB debut on May 11. In 19 games during his rookie campaign, Dean struggled to a 1–6 record and 6.28 ERA with 50 strikeouts across 67 1/3 innings pitched. On October 17, he was removed from the 40–man roster and sent outright to Triple–A Rochester. Dean elected free agency following the season on November 7.

=== Kia Tigers ===
On November 26, 2016, Dean signed a one-year, $900,000 contract with the Kia Tigers of the KBO League. Dean signed a one-year, $925,000 contract with the Tigers on December 1, 2017. In 2017 season, he helped KIA Tigers to win the 2017 Korean Series against Doosan Bears. He became a free agent after the 2018 season.

On February 2, 2019, Dean signed a minor league contract with the Minnesota Twins. He was released prior to the start of the season on March 27.

=== Southern Maryland Blue Crabs ===
On April 18, 2019, Dean signed with the Southern Maryland Blue Crabs of the Atlantic League of Professional Baseball. In 2 starts for the Blue Crabs, he logged a 1–0 record and 0.82 ERA with 17 strikeouts across 11 innings of work.

=== Colorado Rockies ===
On May 6, 2019, Dean's contract was purchased by the Colorado Rockies, and he was assigned to the Triple–A Albuquerque Isotopes. In 18 games (17 starts) for the Albuquerque, he struggled to a 3–13 record and 7.54 ERA with 59 strikeouts across 90 2/3 innings pitched. Dean elected free agency following the season on November 4.

=== Somerset Patriots ===
On March 9, 2020, Dean signed with the Somerset Patriots of the Atlantic League of Professional Baseball. He did not play a game for the team because of the cancellation of the ALPB season due to the COVID-19 pandemic and became a free agent after the year.
