= 2016 Los Angeles Angels season =

Major League Baseball season

2016 Los Angeles Angels
- League: American League
- Division: West
- Ballpark: Angel Stadium
- City: Anaheim, California
- Record: 74–88 (.457)
- Divisional place: 4th
- Owner: Arte Moreno
- Manager: Mike Scioscia
- Television: Fox Sports West (Victor Rojas, Mark Gubicza)
- Radio: KLAA (AM 830) KSPN (AM 710) (Terry Smith, Mark Langston, José Mota) Spanish: KWKW (AM 1330)
- Stats: ESPN.com; Baseball Reference

The 2016 Los Angeles Angels season was the franchise's 56th season and 51st in Anaheim (all of them at Angel Stadium). They finished in fourth place in the American League West and did not make the playoffs. This was the first season since 1996 where they did not officially have Anaheim in their moniker.

The Angels played just four extra-inning games during the season—the fewest of any team in a 162-game season—and lost all four.

== Standings ==
=== Season standings ===
==== American League West ====
AL West
Team	W	L	Pct.	GB	Home	Road
Texas Rangers	95	67	.586	—	53‍–‍28	42‍–‍39
Seattle Mariners	86	76	.531	9	44‍–‍37	42‍–‍39
Houston Astros	84	78	.519	11	43‍–‍38	41‍–‍40
Los Angeles Angels	74	88	.457	21	40‍–‍41	34‍–‍47
Oakland Athletics	69	93	.426	26	34‍–‍47	35‍–‍46

==== American League leaders ====
Division leaders
Team	W	L	Pct.
Texas Rangers	95	67	.586
Cleveland Indians	94	67	.584
Boston Red Sox	93	69	.574

Wild Card teams (Top 2 teams qualify for postseason)
Team	W	L	Pct.	GB
Toronto Blue Jays	89	73	.549	—
Baltimore Orioles	89	73	.549	—
Detroit Tigers	86	75	.534	2½
Seattle Mariners	86	76	.531	3
New York Yankees	84	78	.519	5
Houston Astros	84	78	.519	5
Kansas City Royals	81	81	.500	8
Chicago White Sox	78	84	.481	11
Los Angeles Angels	74	88	.457	15
Oakland Athletics	69	93	.426	20
Tampa Bay Rays	68	94	.420	21
Minnesota Twins	59	103	.364	30

==== Record against opponents ====
2016 American League record Source: MLB Standings Grid – 2016
Team	BAL	BOS	CWS	CLE	DET	HOU	KC	LAA	MIN	NYY	OAK	SEA	TB	TEX	TOR	NL
Baltimore	—	8–11	4–3	5–1	5–2	1–6	4–2	4–2	5–1	10–9	3–4	1–6	13–6	3–4	9–10	14–6
Boston	11–8	—	3–4	4–2	2–5	5–2	2–4	4–3	4–3	11–8	5–1	4–3	12–7	3–3	9–10	14–6
Chicago	3–4	4–3	—	8–11	7–12	3–3	5–14	2–5	12–7	3–3	5–2	4–3	4–3	4–2	5–1	9–11
Cleveland	1–5	2–4	11–8	—	14–4	3–4	14–5	6–1	10–9	2–5	4–2	3–4	5–1	2–5	4–3	13–7
Detroit	2–5	5–2	12–7	4–14	—	4–2	7–12	2–4	15–4	3–3	4–3	4–3	6–1	2–4	3–4	13–7
Houston	6–1	2–5	3–3	4–3	2–4	—	3–4	13–6	5–2	2–4	13–6	11–8	3–3	4–15	2–5	11–9
Kansas City	2–4	4–2	14–5	5–14	12–7	4–3	—	1–5	15–4	2–5	1–6	3–4	5–2	1–6	2–4	10–10
Los Angeles	2–4	3–4	5–2	1–6	4–2	6–13	5–1	—	2–4	1–6	12–7	8–11	3–4	9–10	4–3	9–11
Minnesota	1–5	3–4	7–12	9–10	4–15	2–5	4–15	4–2	—	2–5	2–4	4–2	3–4	5–2	1–6	8–12
New York	9–10	8–11	3–3	5–2	3–3	4–2	5–2	6–1	5–2	—	4–3	3–3	11–8	3–4	7–12	8–12
Oakland	4–3	1–5	2–5	2–4	3–4	6–13	6–1	7–12	4–2	3–4	—	7–12	5–2	9–10	3–3	7–13
Seattle	6–1	3–4	3–4	4–3	3–4	8–11	4–3	11–8	2–4	3–3	12–7	—	4–2	7–12	3–3	13–7
Tampa Bay	6–13	7–12	3–4	1–5	1–6	3–3	2–5	4–3	4–3	8–11	2–5	2–4	—	4–2	11–8	10–10
Texas	4–3	3–3	2–4	5–2	4–2	15–4	6–1	10–9	2–5	4–3	10–9	12–7	2–4	—	3–4	13–7
Toronto	10–9	10–9	1–5	3–4	4–3	5–2	4–2	3–4	6–1	12–7	3–3	3–3	8–11	4–3	—	13–7

== Game log ==
2016 Game Log: 74–88 (Home: 40–41; Away: 34–47)
April: 11–13 (Home: 6–6; Away: 5–7)

#	Date	Opponent	Score	Win	Loss	Save	Attendance	Record	Streak
1	April 4	Cubs	0–9	Arrieta (1–0)	**Richards** (0–1)	—	44,020	0–1	L1
2	April 5	Cubs	1–6	Lester (1–0)	**Heaney** (0–1)	—	37,042	0–2	L2
3	April 7	Rangers	4–3	**Street** (1–0)	Dyson (0–1)	—	39,089	1–2	W1
4	April 8	Rangers	3–7	Griffin (1–0)	**Shoemaker** (0–1)	—	35,207	1–3	L1
5	April 9	Rangers	1–4	Hamels (2–0)	**Richards** (0–2)	Tolleson (2)	38,106	1–4	L2
6	April 10	Rangers	3–1	**Weaver** (1–0)	Perez (0–1)	**Street** (1)	35,097	2–4	W1
7	April 11	@ Athletics	4–1	**Tropeano** (1–0)	Gray (1–1)	**Street** (2)	13,371	3–4	W2
8	April 12	@ Athletics	5–4	**Morin** (1–0)	Doolittle (1–2)	**Street** (3)	13,492	4–4	W3
9	April 13	@ Athletics	5–1	**Shoemaker** (1–1)	Surkamp (0–1)	—	11,216	5–4	W4
10	April 15	@ Twins	4–5	Fien (1–0)	**Salas** (0–1)	Jepsen (1)	22,461	5–5	L1
11	April 16	@ Twins	4–6	Pressly (1–0)	**Smith** (0–1)	Jepsen (2)	27,464	5–6	L2
12	April 17	@ Twins	2–3	Tonkin (1–0)	**Rasmus** (0–1)	—	25,932	5–7	L2
13	April 18	@ White Sox	7–0	**Santiago** (1–0)	Rodon (1–2)	—	14,706	6–7	W1
14	April 19	@ White Sox	0–5	Latos (3–0)	**Shoemaker** (1–2)	Jones (1)	12,093	6–8	L1
15	April 20	@ White Sox	1–2	Sale (4–0)	**Richards** (0–3)	Robertson (6)	12,785	6–9	L2
16	April 21	@ White Sox	3–2	**Weaver** (2-0)	Danks (0-3)	**Street** (4)	11,418	7–9	W1
17	April 22	Mariners	2–5 (10)	Peralta (1-0)	**Álvarez** (0-1)	Cishek (4)	40,755	7–10	L1
18	April 23	Mariners	4–2	**Santiago** (2-0)	Hernández (1-2)	**Street** (5)	41,058	8–10	W1
19	April 24	Mariners	4–9	Miley (1-2)	**Shoemaker** (1-3)	Vincent (1)	37,754	8–11	L1
20	April 25	Royals	6–1	**Richards** (1–3)	Kennedy (2–2)	—	31,061	9–11	W1
21	April 26	Royals	9–4	**Weaver** (3–0)	Vólquez (3–1)	—	34,428	10–11	W2
22	April 27	Royals	4–2	**Salas** (1–1)	Young (1–4)	**Smith** (1)		11–11	W3
23	April 29	@ Rangers	2–4	Lewis (2-0)	**Santiago** (2-1)	Tolleson (8)		11–12	L1
24	April 30	@ Rangers	2–7	Holland (3-1)	**Shoemaker** (1-4)	—		11–13	L2

May: 13–15 (Home: 6–10; Away: 7–5)

#	Date	Opponent	Score	Win	Loss	Save	Attendance	Record	Streak
25	May 1	@ Rangers	9–6	**Mahle** (1–0)	Wilhelmsen (1–2)	—	39,401	12–13	W1
26	May 2	@ Brewers	5–8	Nelson (4–2)	**Weaver** (3–1)	—	21,352	12–14	L1
27	May 3	@ Brewers	4–5	Guerra (1–0)	**Tropeano** (1–1)	Jeffress (7)	28,180	12–15	L2
28	May 4	@ Brewers	7–3	**Salas** (2–1)	Thornburg (2–1)	**Smith** (2)	21,907	13–15	W1
29	May 6	Rays	2–5	Archer (2–4)	**Rasmus** (0–2)	Colomé (7)	41,253	13–16	L1
30	May 7	Rays	2–4	Ramirez (6–1)	**Smith** (0–2)	Colomé (8)	40,148	13–17	L2
31	May 8	Rays	1–3	Andreise (1–0)	**Tropeano** (1–2)	Colomé (9)	41,086	13–18	L3
32	May 10	Cardinals	1–8	Leake (1–3)	**Santiago** (2–2)	—	30,679	13–19	L4
33	May 11	Cardinals	2–5	Garcia (3–2)	**Shoemaker** (1–5)	Rosenthal (6)	33,378	13–20	L5
34	May 12	Cardinals	10–12	Wainwright (3–3)	**Weaver** (3–2)	—	35,413	13–21	L6
35	May 13	@ Mariners	7–6	**Smith** (1–2)	Cishek (2–2)	**Salas** (1)	34,579	14–21	W1
36	May 14	@ Mariners	9–7	**Bedrosian** (1–0)	Chisek (2–3	**Smith** (3)	42,038	15–21	W2
37	May 15	@ Mariners	3–0	**Santiago** (3–2)	Hernandez (3–3)	**Smith** (4)	40,852	16–21	W3
38	May 16	@ Dodgers	7–6	**Shoemaker** (2–5)	Maeda (3–3)	**Salas** (2)	39,583	17–21	W4
39	May 17	@ Dodgers	1–5	Kershaw (6–1)	**Weaver** (3–3)	—	42,514	17–22	L1
40	May 18	Dodgers	1–8	**Tropeano** (2–2)	Bolsinger (0–1)	—	44,006	18–22	W1
41	May 19	Dodgers	7–4	**Alvarez** (1–1)	Stripling (1–3)	**Smith** (5)	45,007	19–22	W2
42	May 20	Orioles	4–9	Givens (3–0)	**Alvarez** (1–2)	—	40,987	19–23	L1
43	May 21	Orioles	1–3	Brach (4–0)	**Smith** (1–3)	Britton (12)	40,137	19–24	L2
44	May 22	Orioles	10–2	**Weaver** (4-3)	Jimenez (2–5)	—	41,280	20–24	W1
45	May 23	@ Rangers	2–0	**Tropeano** (3–2)	Holland (3–4)	**Smith** (6)	25,298	21–24	W2
46	May 24	@ Rangers	1–4	Perez (2–4)	**Chacín** (1–3)	Dyson (5)	26,125	21–25	L1
47	May 25	@ Rangers	9–15	Lewis (4–0)	**Santiago** (3–3)	—	32,480	21–26	L2
48	May 27	Astros	7–2	**Shoemaker** (3–5)	Fiers (3–3)	—	39,047	22–26	W1
49	May 28	Astros	2–4	Keuchel (3–6)	**Weaver** (4–4)	Gregerson (11)	38,176	22–27	L1
50	May 29	Astros	6–8 (13)	Feliz (3–1)	**Morin** (1–1)	Gregerson (12)	36,538	22–28	L2
51	May 30	Tigers	5–1	**Chacin** (2–3)	Verlander (4–5)	—	38,541	23–27	W1
52	May 31	Tigers	11–9	**Street** (2–0)	Lowe (1–3)	—	35,125	24–27	W2

June: 8–19 (Home: 4–10; Away: 4–9)

#	Date	Opponent	Score	Win	Loss	Save	Attendance	Record	Streak
53	June 1	Tigers	0–3	Fulmer (5–1)	**Shoemaker** (3–6)	Rodríguez (15)	35,053	24–29	L1
54	June 3	@ Pirates	9–2	**Weaver** (5–4)	Liriano (4–5)	—	27,643	25–29	W1
55	June 4	@ Pirates	7–8	Locke (5–3)	**Salas** (2–2)	Melancon (17)	31,505	25–30	L1
56	June 5	@ Pirates	5–4	**Guerra** (1–0)	Watson (1–2)	**Street** (6)	27,754	26–30	W1
57	June 6	@ Yankees	2–5	Miller (3–0)	**Shoemaker** (3–7)	Chapman (10)	34,648	26–31	L1
58	June 7	@ Yankees	3–6	Pineda (3–6)	**Huff** (0–1)	Miller (7)	31,034	26–32	L2
59	June 8	@ Yankees	6–12	Swarzak (1–0)	**Weaver** (5–5)	—	31,557	26–33	L3
60	June 9	@ Yankees	3–6	Nova (5–3)	**Chacin** (2–4)	Chapman (11)	34,971	26–34	L4
61	June 10	Indians	2–6	Kluber (4–6)	**Santiago** (3–4)	—	39,487	26–35	L5
62	June 11	Indians	4–3	**Salas** (3–2)	Shaw (0–2)	—	38,296	27–35	W1
63	June 12	Indians	3–8	Salazar (7–3)	**Huff** (0–2)	—	36,383	27–36	L1
64	June 13	Twins	4–9	Nolasco (3–4)	**Weaver** (5–6)	—	36,424	27–37	L2
65	June 14	Twins	5–4	**Chacín** (3–4)	Santana (1–7)	**Street** (7)	36,272	28–37	W1
66	June 15	Twins	10–2	**Santiago** (4–4)	Duffey (2–6)	—	36,717	29–37	W2
67	June 17	@ Athletics	2–3	Madson (3–2)	**Salas** (3–3)	—	24,591	29–38	L1
68	June 18	@ Athletics	7–1	**Lincecum** (1–0)	Dull (1–2)	—	25,078	30–38	W1
69	June 19	@ Athletics	2–0	**Weaver** (6–6)	Surkamp (0–5)	—	22,846	31–38	W2
70	June 20	@ Astros	7–10	Fister (8–3)	**Chacín** (3–5)	—	25,553	31–39	L1
71	June 21	@ Astros	2–3	Gregerson (1–1)	**Street** (2–1)	—	25,004	31–40	L2
72	June 22	@ Astros	2–3	Gregerson (2–1)	**Shoemaker** (3–8)	Harris (6)	29,649	31–41	L3
73	June 23	Athletics	4–5	Graveman (3–6)	**Lincecum** (1–1)	Doolittle (4)	36,412	31–42	L4
74	June 24	Athletics	4–7	Dull (2–2)	**Salas** (3–4)	Madson (14)	41,356	31–43	L5
75	June 25	Athletics	3–7	Overton (1–0)	**Chacín** (3–6)	—	40,643	31–44	L6
76	June 26	Athletics	7–6	**Street** (3–1)	Hendriks (0–1)	—	36,715	32–44	W1
77	June 27	Astros	2–4	Gregerson (3–1)	**Salas** (3–5)	Will Harris (7)	36,839	32–45	L1
78	June 28	Astros	1–7	Feldman (5–3)	**Lincecum** (1–2)	—	38,781	32–46	L2
79	June 29	Astros	4–10	Keuchel (5–9)	**Weaver** (6–7)	—	36,683	32–47	L3

July: 15–11 (Home: 8–2; Away: 7–9)

#	Date	Opponent	Score	Win	Loss	Save	Attendance	Record	Streak
80	July 1	@ Red Sox	4–5	Wright (9–5)	**Chacín** (3–7)	Kimbrel (17)	37,117	32–48	L4
81	July 2	@ Red Sox	21–2	Santiago (5–4)	**Buchholz** (3–9)	—	36,552	33–48	W1
82	July 3	@ Red Sox	5–10	O'Sullivan (2–0)	**Shoemaker** (3–9)	—	36,801	33–49	L1
83	July 4	@ Rays	2–4	Moore (5–5)	**Salas** (3–6)	—	14,532	33–50	L2
84	July 5	@ Rays	13–5	**Guerra** (2–0)	Odorizzi (3–4)	—	14,896	34–50	W1
85	July 6	@ Rays	7–2	**Weaver** (7–7)	Smyly (2–10)	—	11,267	35–50	W2
86	July 7	@ Rays	5–1	**Santiago** (6–4)	Snell (1–4)	—	14,576	36–50	W3
87	July 8	@ Orioles	9–5	**Shoemaker** (4–9)	Jiménez (5–9)	—	44,317	37–50	W4
88	July 9	@ Orioles	2–3	Brach (9–1)	**Smith** (1–4)	Britton (26)	43,288	37–51	L1
89	July 10	@ Orioles	2–4	Tillman 12–2)	**Lincecum** (1–3)	Britton (27)	32,963	37–52	L2
**87th All-Star Game in San Diego, California**
90	July 15	White Sox	7–0	**Santiago** (7–4)	González (2–5)	—	42,031	38–52	W1
91	July 16	White Sox	1–0	**Shoemaker** (5–9)	Shields (4–11)	—	39,620	39–52	W2
92	July 17	White Sox	8–1	**Weaver** (8–7)	Turner (0–1)	—	36,834	40–52	W3
93	July 18	Rangers	9–5	**Ramirez** (2–3)	Kela (1–1)	—	36,020	41–52	W4
94	July 19	Rangers	8–6	**Lincecum** (2–3)	Lohse (0–2)	**Street** (8)	36,368	42–52	W5
95	July 20	Rangers	7–4	**Santiago** (8–4)	Perez (7–7)	—	37,095	43–52	W6
96	July 22	@ Astros	1–2	McCullers (5–4)	**Shoemaker** (5–10)	Harris (10)	36,453	43–53	L1
97	July 23	@ Astros	2–7	McHugh (7–6)	**Weaver** (8–8)	—	35,119	43–54	L2
98	July 24	@ Astros	3–13	Fiers (7–4)	**Lincecum** (2–4)	—	32,721	43–55	L3
99	July 25	@ Royals	6–2	**Santiago** (9–4)	Kennedy (6–9)	—	33,828	44–55	W1
100	July 26	@ Royals	13–0	**Skaggs** (1–0)	Gee (3–4)	—	28,026	45–55	W2
101	July 27	@ Royals	5–7	Soria (4–4)	**Shoemaker** (5–11)	—	30,279	45–56	L1
102	July 28	Red Sox	2–1	**Bedrosian** (2–0)	Ziegler (2–5)	—	41,257	46–56	W1
103	July 29	Red Sox	2–6	Porcello (14–2)	**Lincecum** (2–5)	—	39,113	46–57	L1
104	July 30	Red Sox	2–5	**Santiago** (10–4)	Pomeranz (8–9)	**Street** (9)	43,150	47–57	W1
105	July 31	Red Sox	3–5	Buchholz (4–9)	**Street** (3–2)	Ziegler (20)	39,553	47–58	L1

August: 12–16 (Home: 8–5; Away: 4–11)

#	Date	Opponent	Score	Win	Loss	Save	Attendance	Record	Streak
106	August 2	Athletics	5–4	**Shoemaker** (6–11)	Manaea (3–6)	**Bedrosian** (1)	36,052	48–58	W1
107	August 3	Athletics	8–6	**Morin** (2–1)	Dull (5–3)	—	37,306	49–58	W2
108	August 4	Athletics	6–8 (10)	Madson (4-4)	**Morin** (2-2)	Dull (2)	34,196	49-59	L1
109	August 5	@ Mariners	4–6	Hernandez (4–4)	**Lincecum** (2–6)	Díaz (3)	40,354	49–60	L2
110	August 6	@ Mariners	6–8	Storen (2–3)	**Valdez** (0–1)	Díaz (4)	45,618	49–61	L3
111	August 7	@ Mariners	1–3	Paxton (4–5)	**Shoemaker** (6–12)	Wilhelmsen (1)	44,812	49–62	L4
112	August 9	@ Cubs	1–5	Lackey (9–7)	**Weaver** (8–9)	—	41,227	46–63	L5
113	August 10	@ Cubs	1–3	Hammel (12–5)	**Nolasco** (4–9)	Chapman (24)	41,015	49–64	L6
114	August 11	@ Indians	4–14	Kluber (12–8)	**Chacín** (3–8)	—	16,652	49–65	L7
115	August 12	@ Indians	3-–13	Carrasco (8–6)	**Skaggs** (1–1)	—	27,014	49–66	L8
116	August 13	@ Indians	1–5	Clevinger (1–1)	**Shoemaker** (6–13)	—	30,409	49–67	L9
117	August 14	@ Indians	4–5	Bauer (9–5)	**Weaver** (8–10)	Allen (22)	18,979	49–68	L10
118	August 15	Mariners	2–3	Hernández (7–4)	**Nolasco** (4–10)	Díaz (7)	35,840	49–69	L11
119	August 16	Mariners	7–6	**Oberholtzer** (3–2)	Caminero (2–3)	**Salas** (3)	37,546	50–69	W1
120	August 17	Mariners	3–4	Storen (3–3)	**Skaggs** (1–2)	Díaz (8)	36,950	50–70	L1
121	August 18	Mariners	6–4	**Shoemaker** (7–13)	Iwakuma (14–8)	—	37,721	51–70	W1
122	August 19	Yankees	0–7	Tanaka (10–4)	**Weaver** (8–11)	—	40,256	51–71	L1
123	August 20	Yankees	1–5	Cessa (3–0)	**Nolasco** (4–11)	—	44,129	52–71	L2
124	August 21	Yankees	2–0	**Chacin** (4–8)	Green (2–3)	**Salas** (4)	40,309	52–72	W1
125	August 23	@ Blue Jays	2–7	Dickey (9–13)	**Skaggs** (1–3)	—	46,696	52–73	L1
126	August 24	@ Blue Jays	8–2	**Shoemaker** (8–13)	Estrada (7-6)	—	44,404	53–73	W1
127	August 25	@ Blue Jays	6–3	**Weaver** (9-11)	Happ (17-4)	—	46,273	54–73	W2
128	August 26	@ Tigers	2–4	Verlander (14–7)	**Nolasco** (4–12)	Rodríguez (36)	31,357	54–74	L1
129	August 27	@ Tigers	3–2	**Chacín** (4–6)	Fulmer (10–5)	**Salas** (5)	33,115	55–74	W1
130	August 28	@ Tigers	5–0	**Skaggs** (2–3)	Sánchez (7–13)	—	28,220	56–74	W2
131	August 29	Reds	9–2	**Shoemaker** (9–13)	Straily (10–7)	—	34,161	57–74	W3
132	August 30	Reds	4–2	**Weaver** (10–11)	Adleman (2–2)	**Salas** (6)	33,042	58–74	W4
133	August 31	Reds	3–0	**Nolasco** (5–12)	Finnegan (8–10)	—	34,215	59–74	W5

September: 14–13 (Home: 7–7; Away: 7–6)

#	Date	Opponent	Score	Win	Loss	Save	Attendance	Record	Streak
134	September 2	@ Mariners	8–11	Miranda (2–1)	**Oberholtzer** (3–3)	Díaz (12)	16,775	59–75	L1
135	September 3	@ Mariners	10–3	**Skaggs** (3–3)	Walker (4–10)	—	20,537	60–75	W1
136	September 4	@ Mariners	4–2	**Guerra** (3–0)	Iwakuma (14–11)	**Bailey** (1)	24,033	61–75	W2
137	September 5	@ Athletics	10–7	**Valdez** (1–1)	Alcántara (0–1)	**Bailey** (2)	18,149	62–75	W3
138	September 6	@ Athletics	2–3	Axford (5–4)	**Nolasco** (5–13)	Madson (28)	12,298	62–76	L1
139	September 7	@ Athletics	1–4	Cotton (1–0)	**Meyer** (0–2)	Madson (29)	11,866	62–77	L2
140	September 9	Rangers	1–2	Bush (7–2)	**Ramirez** (1–1)	Dyson (33)	42,137	62–78	L3
141	September 10	Rangers	5–8	Scheppers (1–0)	**Valdez** (1–2)	Dyson (34)	39,146	62–79	L4
142	September 11	Rangers	2–3	**Weaver** (11–11)	Lewis (6–2)	**Bailey** (3)	35,052	63–79	W1
143	September 12	Mariners	1-8	Miranda (4-1)	**Nolasco** (5–14)	—	29,932	63-80	L1
144	September 13	Mariners	0-8	Walker (6-10)	**Meyer** (0-3)	—	32,129	63-81	L2
145	September 14	Mariners	1–2	Iwakuma (16–11)	**Álvarez** (1–3)	Díaz (16)	33,501	63–82	L3
146	September 15	Blue Jays	2–7	Happ (19–4)	**Wright** (0–3)	—	37,559	63–83	L4
147	September 16	Blue Jays	0–5	Dickey (10–14)	**Weaver** (11–12)	Osuna (33)	42,159	63–84	L5
148	September 17	Blue Jays	6–1	**Nolasco** (6–14)	Liriano (7–13)	—	39,195	64–84	W1
149	September 18	Blue Jays	4–0	**Meyer** (1–3)	Stroman (9–9)	—	36,270	65–84	W2
150	September 19	@ Rangers	2–3	Dyson (3–2)	**Álvarez** (1–3)	—	29,068	65–85	L1
151	September 20	@ Rangers	4–5	Martinez (2–3)	**Wright** (0–4)	Dyson (35)	26,520	65–86	L2
152	September 21	@ Rangers	5–4	**Weaver** (12–12)	Holland (7–9)	**Bailey** (4)	35,609	66–86	W1
153	September 22	@ Astros	2–0	**Nolasco** (7–14)	Fiers (11–8)	**Bailey** (5)	20,022	67–86	W2
154	September 23	@ Astros	10–6	**Ege** (1–0)	Giles (2–5)	—	29,429	68–86	W3
155	September 24	@ Astros	10–4	**Valdez** (2–3)	Gregerson (4–2)	—	27,565	69–86	W4
156	September 25	@ Astros	1–4	Musgrove (4–4)	**Wright** (0–5)	Giles (14)	32,958	69–87	L1
157	September 26	Athletics	2–1	**Ramírez** (3–4)	Dull (5–5)	**Bailey** (6)	29,934	70–87	W1
158	September 27	Athletics	8–1	**Nolasco** (8–14)	Mengden (2–9)	—	27,531	71–87	W2
159	September 28	Athletics	8–6	**Achter** (1–0)	Detwiler (2–4)	**Ramírez** (2)	32,524	72–87	W3
160	September 30	Astros	7–1	**Wright** (1–5)	Peacock (0–1)	—	30,112	73–87	W4

October: 1–1 (Home: 1–1; Away: 0–0)

#	Date	Opponent	Score	Win	Loss	Save	Attendance	Record	Streak
161	October 1	Astros	0–3	McHugh (13–10)	**Skaggs** (3–4)	Giles (15)	32,487	73–88	L1
162	October 2	Astros	8–1	**Chacín** (6–8)	Rodgers (0–1)	28,083	28,083	74–88	W1

Legend: = Win = Loss = Postponement
Bold = Angels team member

== Roster ==
2016 Los Angeles Angels
Roster
Pitchers: 60 A. J. Achter; 62 Al Albuquerque; 48 José Álvarez; 37 Andrew Bailey; 68 Cam Bedrosian; 49 Jhoulys Chacín; 20 Cody Ege; 54 Deolis Guerra; 40 Javy Guerra; 28 Andrew Heaney; 32 David Huff; 55 Tim Lincecum; 65 Greg Mahle; 40 Alex Meyer; 64 Mike Morin; 47 Ricky Nolasco; 38 Brett Oberholtzer; 66 J. C. Ramírez; 46 Cory Rasmus; 43 Garrett Richards; 59 Fernando Salas; 53 Hector Santiago; 52 Matt Shoemaker; 45 Tyler Skaggs; 38 Joe Smith; 16 Huston Street; 35 Nick Tropeano; 32 José Valdez; 36 Jered Weaver; 62 Daniel Wright	Catchers: 13,47 Jett Bandy; 57 Juan Graterol; 58 Carlos Pérez; 18 Geovany Soto; Infielders: 51 Ji-man Choi; 22 Kaleb Cowart; 24 C. J. Cron; 0,6 Yunel Escobar; 12 Johnny Giavotella; 19 Jefry Marté; 7 Cliff Pennington; 8 Gregorio Petit; 5 Albert Pujols; 23 Brendan Ryan; 2 Andrelton Simmons	Outfielders: 3 Nick Buss; 56 Kole Calhoun; 37 Todd Cunningham; 3 Craig Gentry; 25 Daniel Nava; 39 Rafael Ortega; 17 Shane Robinson; 27 Mike Trout	Manager: 14 Mike Scioscia; Coaches: 63 Scott Radinsky (bullpen); 92 Anel De Los Santos (bullpen catcher); 9 Gary DiSarcina (first base); 21 Dino Ebel (bench); 70 Tom Gregorio (bullpen catcher); 4 Alfredo Griffin (infield); 31 Dave Hansen (hitting); 41 Charles Nagy (pitching); 61 Steve Soliz (catching/player information); 44 Paul Sorrento (assistant hitting); 10 Ron Roenicke (third base)

== Player stats ==
=== Batting ===
Note: G = Games played; AB = At bats; R = Runs; H = Hits; 2B = Doubles; 3B = Triples; HR = Home runs; RBI = Runs batted in; SB = Stolen bases; BB = Walks; AVG = Batting average; SLG = Slugging average

Player	G	AB	R	H	2B	3B	HR	RBI	SB	BB	AVG	SLG
Kole Calhoun	157	594	91	161	35	5	18	75	2	67	.271	.438
Albert Pujols	152	593	71	159	19	0	31	119	4	49	.268	.457
Mike Trout	159	549	123	173	32	5	29	100	30	116	.315	.550
Yunel Escobar	132	517	68	157	28	1	5	39	0	40	.304	..391
Andrelton Simmons	124	448	48	126	22	2	4	44	10	28	.281	.366
C.J. Cron	116	407	51	113	25	2	16	69	2	24	.278	.467
Johnny Giavotella	99	346	44	90	20	1	6	31	4	13	.260	.376
Carlos Pérez	87	268	25	56	16	0	5	31	1	12	.209	.325
Jefry Marte	88	258	38	65	14	0	15	44	2	18	.252	.481
Jett Bandy	70	209	23	49	9	0	8	25	1	11	.234	.392
Gregorio Petit	89	204	21	50	13	1	2	17	1	15	.245	.348
Rafael Ortega	66	185	24	43	8	0	1	16	8	13	.232	.292
Cliff Pennington	74	172	18	36	4	2	3	10	1	13	.209	.308
Daniel Nava	45	119	10	28	5	0	1	13	0	9	.235	.303
Ji-Man Choi	54	112	9	19	4	0	5	12	2	16	.170	.339
Shane Robinson	65	98	16	17	3	0	1	10	3	10	.173	.235
Kaleb Cowart	31	85	8	15	4	0	1	8	0	0	.176	.259
Nick Buss	36	81	7	16	7	1	1	8	2	6	.198	.346
Geovany Soto	26	78	11	21	5	0	4	9	0	6	.269	.487
Todd Cunningham	20	27	5	4	3	0	0	1	0	1	.148	.259
Juan Graterol	9	14	2	4	2	0	0	3	0	0	.286	.429
Brendan Ryan	17	13	1	1	0	0	0	0	0	0	.077	.077
Pitcher totals	162	20	1	2	0	0	0	0	0	1	.100	.100
Team totals	162	5431	717	1410	279	20	156	686	73	471	.260	.405

=== Pitching ===
Note: W = Wins; L = Losses; ERA = Earned run average; G = Games pitched; GS = Games started; SV = Saves; IP = Innings pitched; H = Hits allowed; R = Runs allowed; ER = Earned runs allowed; BB = Walks allowed; SO = Strikeouts

Player	W	L	ERA	G	GS	SV	IP	H	R	ER	BB	SO
Jered Weaver	12	12	5.06	31	31	0	178.0	209	106	100	51	103
Matt Shoemaker	9	13	3.88	27	27	0	160.0	166	71	69	30	143
Hector Santiago	10	4	4.25	22	22	0	120.2	104	61	57	57	107
Jhoulys Chacin	5	6	4.68	29	17	0	117.1	124	64	61	47	92
Ricky Nolasco	4	6	3.21	11	11	0	73.0	63	27	26	15	51
Nick Tropeano	3	2	3.56	13	13	0	68.1	70	27	27	31	68
José Álvarez	1	3	3.45	64	0	0	57.1	71	29	22	15	51
Fernando Salas	3	6	4.47	58	0	6	56.1	52	28	28	19	45
Mike Morin	2	2	4.37	60	0	0	55.2	52	31	27	15	49
Deolis Guerra	3	0	3.21	44	0	0	53.1	52	23	19	7	36
Tyler Skaggs	3	4	4.17	10	10	0	49.2	51	23	23	23	50
J. C. Ramírez	2	1	2.91	43	0	1	46.1	42	17	15	13	31
Cam Bedrosian	2	0	1.12	45	0	1	40.1	30	7	5	14	51
Tim Lincecum	2	6	9.16	9	9	0	38.1	68	41	39	23	32
A.J. Achter	1	0	3.11	27	0	0	37.2	43	13	13	12	14
Joe Smith	1	4	3.82	38	0	6	37.2	36	16	16	13	25
Garrett Richards	1	3	2.34	6	6	0	34.2	31	16	9	15	34
Daniel Wright	1	3	5.40	5	5	0	26.2	32	16	16	6	15
Cory Rasmus	0	2	5.84	19	1	0	24.2	25	16	16	16	17
José Valdez	2	3	4.24	25	0	0	23.1	17	11	11	16	22
Huston Street	3	2	6.45	26	0	9	22.1	31	16	16	12	14
Alex Meyer	1	2	4.57	5	5	0	21.2	17	11	11	13	24
Brett Oberholtzer	1	1	8.55	11	2	0	20.0	27	19	19	9	16
Greg Mahle	1	0	5.40	24	0	0	18.1	23	13	11	10	14
Andrew Bailey	0	0	2.38	12	0	6	11.1	9	3	3	2	8
Cody Ege	1	0	1.04	13	0	0	8.2	8	1	1	3	9
Javy Guerra	0	0	5.68	7	0	0	6.1	5	4	4	7	4
Andrew Heaney	0	1	6.00	1	1	0	6.0	7	4	4	0	7
David Huff	0	2	11.81	2	2	0	5.1	13	10	7	2	3
Al Alburquerque	0	0	4.50	2	0	0	2.0	2	3	1	2	1
Team totals	74	88	4.28	162	162	29	1421.1	1480	727	676	498	1136

== Farm system ==
Level	Team	League	Manager
AAA	Salt Lake Bees	Pacific Coast League	Keith Johnson
AA	Arkansas Travelers	Texas League	Mark Parent
A-Advanced	Inland Empire 66ers of San Bernardino	California League	Chad Tracy
A	Burlington Bees	Midwest League	Adam Melhuse
Rookie	Orem Owlz	Pioneer League	Dave Stapleton
Rookie	AZL Angels	Arizona League	Elio Sarmiento

LEAGUE CHAMPIONS: Orem

== Awards and statistical leaders ==
The following players or coaches won awards or were recognized for their performance during the 2016 season.

- Mike Trout

American League MVP
Silver Slugger Award for Outfield
Esurance Award for Best Major Leaguer
LA Sports Awards Sportsman of the Year
Bases on balls leader
Runs Scored leader
On-Base Percentage leader
All-Star

== See also ==
- Los Angeles Angels
- Angel Stadium

Records
Preceded by 2015	Los Angeles Angels seasons 2016	Succeeded by 2017
