= 2016 Seattle Mariners season =

2016 Seattle Mariners
- League: American League
- Division: West
- Ballpark: Safeco Field
- City: Seattle, Washington
- Record: 86–76 (.531)
- Divisional place: 2nd
- Owners: Nintendo of America, represented by Howard Lincoln
- Managers: Scott Servais
- Television: Root Sports Northwest (Dave Sims, Mike Blowers)
- Radio: ESPN-710; Seattle Mariners Radio Network (Rick Rizzs, Aaron Goldsmith)

The 2016 Seattle Mariners season was the 40th season in franchise history. The Mariners played their 17th full season (18th overall) at Safeco Field. Despite finishing with a winning record of 86–76, they failed to make the playoffs, finishing second place in the American League West.

== Standings ==
=== American League West ===
AL West
Team	W	L	Pct.	GB	Home	Road
Texas Rangers	95	67	.586	—	53‍–‍28	42‍–‍39
Seattle Mariners	86	76	.531	9	44‍–‍37	42‍–‍39
Houston Astros	84	78	.519	11	43‍–‍38	41‍–‍40
Los Angeles Angels	74	88	.457	21	40‍–‍41	34‍–‍47
Oakland Athletics	69	93	.426	26	34‍–‍47	35‍–‍46

=== American League Wild Card ===
Division leaders
Team	W	L	Pct.
Texas Rangers	95	67	.586
Cleveland Indians	94	67	.584
Boston Red Sox	93	69	.574

Wild Card teams (Top 2 teams qualify for postseason)
Team	W	L	Pct.	GB
Toronto Blue Jays	89	73	.549	—
Baltimore Orioles	89	73	.549	—
Detroit Tigers	86	75	.534	2½
Seattle Mariners	86	76	.531	3
New York Yankees	84	78	.519	5
Houston Astros	84	78	.519	5
Kansas City Royals	81	81	.500	8
Chicago White Sox	78	84	.481	11
Los Angeles Angels	74	88	.457	15
Oakland Athletics	69	93	.426	20
Tampa Bay Rays	68	94	.420	21
Minnesota Twins	59	103	.364	30

=== Record against opponents ===
2016 American League record Source: MLB Standings Grid – 2016
Team	BAL	BOS	CWS	CLE	DET	HOU	KC	LAA	MIN	NYY	OAK	SEA	TB	TEX	TOR	NL
Baltimore	—	8–11	4–3	5–1	5–2	1–6	4–2	4–2	5–1	10–9	3–4	1–6	13–6	3–4	9–10	14–6
Boston	11–8	—	3–4	4–2	2–5	5–2	2–4	4–3	4–3	11–8	5–1	4–3	12–7	3–3	9–10	14–6
Chicago	3–4	4–3	—	8–11	7–12	3–3	5–14	2–5	12–7	3–3	5–2	4–3	4–3	4–2	5–1	9–11
Cleveland	1–5	2–4	11–8	—	14–4	3–4	14–5	6–1	10–9	2–5	4–2	3–4	5–1	2–5	4–3	13–7
Detroit	2–5	5–2	12–7	4–14	—	4–2	7–12	2–4	15–4	3–3	4–3	4–3	6–1	2–4	3–4	13–7
Houston	6–1	2–5	3–3	4–3	2–4	—	3–4	13–6	5–2	2–4	13–6	11–8	3–3	4–15	2–5	11–9
Kansas City	2–4	4–2	14–5	5–14	12–7	4–3	—	1–5	15–4	2–5	1–6	3–4	5–2	1–6	2–4	10–10
Los Angeles	2–4	3–4	5–2	1–6	4–2	6–13	5–1	—	2–4	1–6	12–7	8–11	3–4	9–10	4–3	9–11
Minnesota	1–5	3–4	7–12	9–10	4–15	2–5	4–15	4–2	—	2–5	2–4	4–2	3–4	5–2	1–6	8–12
New York	9–10	8–11	3–3	5–2	3–3	4–2	5–2	6–1	5–2	—	4–3	3–3	11–8	3–4	7–12	8–12
Oakland	4–3	1–5	2–5	2–4	3–4	6–13	6–1	7–12	4–2	3–4	—	7–12	5–2	9–10	3–3	7–13
Seattle	6–1	3–4	3–4	4–3	3–4	8–11	4–3	11–8	2–4	3–3	12–7	—	4–2	7–12	3–3	13–7
Tampa Bay	6–13	7–12	3–4	1–5	1–6	3–3	2–5	4–3	4–3	8–11	2–5	2–4	—	4–2	11–8	10–10
Texas	4–3	3–3	2–4	5–2	4–2	15–4	6–1	10–9	2–5	4–3	10–9	12–7	2–4	—	3–4	13–7
Toronto	10–9	10–9	1–5	3–4	4–3	5–2	4–2	3–4	6–1	12–7	3–3	3–3	8–11	4–3	—	13–7

== Season summary ==
=== Game log ===
2016 Game Log: 86–76 (Home: 44–37; Away: 42–39)
April: 13–10 (Home: 5–6; Away: 8–4)

#	Date	Opponent	Score	Win	Loss	Save	Attendance	Record	Streak
1	April 4	@ Rangers	2–3	Hamels (1–0)	**Hernández** (0–1)	Tolleson (1)	49,289	0–1	L1
2	April 5	@ Rangers	10–2	**Vincent** (1–0)	Barnette (0–1)	—	28,386	1–1	W1
3	April 6	@ Rangers	9–5	**Benoit** (1–0)	Tolleson (0–1)	—	26,945	2–1	W2
4	April 8	Athletics	2–3	Doolittle (1–1)	**Cishek** (0–1)	Madson (2)	47,065	2–2	L1
5	April 9	Athletics	1–6	Hill (1–1)	**Karns** (0–1)	—	36,424	2–3	L2
6	April 10	Athletics	1–2 (10)	Axford (1–0)	**Vincent** (1–1)	Doolittle (1)	30,834	2–4	L3
7	April 11	Rangers	3–7	Lewis (1–0)	**Iwakuma** (0–1)	—	13,468	2–5	L4
8	April 12	Rangers	0–8	Holland (1–0)	**Miley** (0–1)	—	13,376	2–6	L5
9	April 13	Rangers	4–2 (10)	**Cishek** (1–1)	Diekman (0–1)	—	15,075	3–6	W1
10	April 15	@ Yankees	7–1	**Karns** (1–1)	Severino (0–2)	—	35,531	4–6	W2
11	April 16	@ Yankees	3–2	**Hernández** (1–1)	Sabathia (1–1)	**Cishek** (1)	38,574	5–6	W3
12	April 17	@ Yankees	3–4	Tanaka (1–0)	**Iwakuma** (0–2)	Miller (3)	43,856	5–7	L1
13	April 19	@ Indians	2–3	Carrasco (2–0)	**Miley** (0–2)	Allen (4)	9,393	5–8	L2
14	April 20	@ Indians	2–1	**Walker** (1–0)	Salazar (2–1)	**Cishek** (2)	9,890	6–8	W1
15	April 21	@ Indians	10–7 (10)	**Zych** (1–0)	Allen (0–1)	**Cishek** (3)	11,525	7–8	W2
16	April 22	@ Angels	5–2 (10)	**Peralta** (1–0)	Álvarez (0–1)	**Cishek** (4)	40,755	8–8	W3
17	April 23	@ Angels	2–4	Santiago (2–0)	**Hernández** (1–2)	Street (5)	41,058	8–9	L1
18	April 24	@ Angels	9–4	**Miley** (1–2)	Shoemaker (1–3)	**Vincent** (1)	37,754	9–9	W1
19	April 25	Astros	3–2	**Walker** (2–0)	Fister (1–3)	**Cishek** (5)	14,832	10–9	W2
20	April 26	Astros	11–1	**Karns** (2–1)	Keuchel (2–3)	—	13,821	11–9	W3
21	April 27	Astros	4–7	McHugh (2–3)	**Iwakuma** (0–3)	—	14,173	11–10	L1
22	April 29	Royals	1–0	**Hernández** (2–2)	Medlen (1–2)	**Cishek** (6)	38,684	12–10	W1
23	April 30	Royals	6–0	**Miley** (2–2)	Ventura (2–1)	—	43,444	13–10	W2

May: 17–11 (Home: 7–8; Away: 10–3)

#	Date	Opponent	Score	Win	Loss	Save	Attendance	Record	Streak
24	May 1	Royals	1–4	Kennedy (3–2)	**Walker** (2–1)	Davis (8)	37,053	13–11	L1
25	May 2	@ Athletics	4–3	**Karns** (3–1)	Graveman (1–3)	**Cishek** (7)	10,535	14–11	W1
26	May 3	@ Athletics	8–2	**Iwakuma** (1–3)	Gray (3–3)	—	12,584	15–11	W2
27	May 4	@ Athletics	9–8	**Montgomery** (1–0)	Axford (2–1)	**Cishek** (8)	16,238	16–11	W3
28	May 5	@ Astros	6–3	**Vincent** (2–1)	Gregerson (0–1)	**Cishek** (9)	20,151	17–11	W4
29	May 6	@ Astros	3–6	Fister (3–3)	**Walker** (2–2)	Gregerson (7)	25,413	17–12	L1
30	May 7	@ Astros	3–2 (10)	**Cishek** (2–1)	Sipp (0–2)	—	31,559	18–12	W1
31	May 8	@ Astros	1–5	McHugh (4–3)	**Iwakuma** (1–4)	—	28,148	18–13	L1
32	May 9	Rays	5–2	**Hernández** (3–2)	Eveland (0–1)	**Cishek** (10)	15,230	19–13	W1
33	May 10	Rays	6–4	**Miley** (3–2)	Smyly (1–4)	**Cishek** (11)	16,013	20–13	W2
34	May 11	Rays	6–5 (11)	**Johnson** (1–0)	Geltz (0–1)	—	23,000	21–13	W3
35	May 13	Angels	6–7	Smith (1–2)	**Cishek** (2–2)	Salas (1)	34,579	21–14	L1
36	May 14	Angels	7–9	Bedrosian (1–0)	**Cishek** (2–3)	Smith (3)	42,038	21–15	L2
37	May 15	Angels	0–3	Santiago (3–2)	**Hernández** (3–3)	Smith (4)	40,852	21–16	L3
38	May 17	@ Orioles	10–0	**Miley** (4–2)	Jiménez (2–4)	—	14,477	22–16	W1
39	May 18	@ Orioles	2–5	Tillman (6–1)	**Walker** (2–3)	Britton (11)	21,167	22–17	L1
40	May 19	@ Orioles	7–2	**Karns** (4–1)	Wilson (2–2)	—	35,012	23–17	W1
41	May 20	@ Reds	8–3	**Iwakuma** (2–4)	Wood (3–1)	—	20,435	24–17	W2
42	May 21	@ Reds	4–0	**Hernández** (4–3)	Lamb (0–2)	—	38,200	25–17	W3
43	May 22	@ Reds	5–4	**Miley** (5–2)	Simón (1–5)	**Cishek** (12)	24,123	26–17	W4
44	May 23	Athletics	0–5	Hill (7–3)	**Walker** (2–4)	—	16,370	26–18	L1
45	May 24	Athletics	6–5	**Montgomery** (2–0)	Madson (2–1)	—	17,471	27–18	W1
46	May 25	Athletics	13–3	**Iwakuma** (3–4)	Neal (0–1)	—	19,227	28–18	W2
47	May 27	Twins	2–7	Dean (1–1)	**Hernández** (4–4)	—	40,921	28–19	L1
48	May 28	Twins	5–6	Pressly (2–3)	**Vincent** (2–2)	Jepsen (5)	28,309	28–20	L2
49	May 29	Twins	4–5	Nolasco (2–3)	**Walker** (2–5)	Jepsen (6)	33,748	28–21	L3
50	May 30	Padres	9–3	**Karns** (5–1)	Cashner (2–5)	—	29,764	29–21	W1
51	May 31	Padres	16–4	**Iwakuma** (4–4)	Shields (2–7)	—	16,815	30–21	W2

June: 10–18 (Home: 7–6; Away: 3–12)

#	Date	Opponent	Score	Win	Loss	Save	Attendance	Record	Streak
52	June 1	@ Padres	6–14	Friedrich (2–1)	**Paxton** (0–1)	—	20,557	30–22	L1
53	June 2	@ Padres	16–13	**Martin** (1–0)	Maurer (0–2)	**Cishek** (13)	22,588	31–22	W1
54	June 3	@ Rangers	3–7	Darvish (2–0)	**Walker** (2–6)	—	32,395	31–23	L1
55	June 4	@ Rangers	4–10	Pérez (4–4)	**Karns** (5–2)	—	34,317	31–24	L2
56	June 5	@ Rangers	2–3	Holland (5–4)	**Iwakuma** (4–5)	Dyson (7)	37,616	31–25	L3
57	June 6	Indians	1–3	Bauer (4–2)	**Paxton** (0–2)	Allen (12)	15,824	31–26	L4
58	June 7	Indians	7–1	**Miley** (6–2)	Anderson (1–4)	—	16,944	32–26	W1
59	June 8	Indians	5–0	**Walker** (3–6)	Carrasco (2–1)	—	15,337	33–26	W2
60	June 9	Indians	3–5	Otero (1–0)	**Benoit** (1–1)	Allen (13)	19,901	33–27	L1
61	June 10	Rangers	7–5	**Iwakuma** (5–5)	Holland (5–5)	**Cishek** (14)	37,055	34–27	W1
62	June 11	Rangers	1–2 (11)	Bush (2–0)	**Montgomery** (2–1)	Dyson (9)	36,055	34–28	L1
63	June 12	Rangers	4–6	Hamels (6–1)	**Miley** (6–3)	Dyson (10)	39,251	34–29	L2
64	June 14	@ Rays	7–8	Garton (1–0)	**Montgomery** (2–2)	Colomé (19)	11,455	34–30	L3
65	June 15	@ Rays	2–3 (13)	Andriese (6–0)	**Montgomery** (2–3)	—	12,239	34–31	L4
66	June 16	@ Rays	6–4	**Paxton** (1–2)	Snell (0–1)	**Cishek** (15)	11,331	35–31	W1
67	June 17	@ Red Sox	8–4	**Iwakuma** (6–5)	Elias (0–1)	**Cishek** (16)	35,896	36–31	W2
68	June 18	@ Red Sox	2–6	Porcello (8–2)	**Sampson** (0–1)	—	37,195	36–32	L1
69	June 19	@ Red Sox	1–2	Price (8–4)	Díaz (0–1)	Kimbrel (16)	37,211	36–33	L2
70	June 20	@ Tigers	7–8 (12)	Sánchez (4–7)	**Nuño** (0–1)	—	27,670	36–34	L3
71	June 21	@ Tigers	2–4	Rondón (1–0)	**Paxton** (1–3)	Rodríguez (20)	30,150	36–35	L4
72	June 22	@ Tigers	1–5	Ryan (2–2)	**Iwakuma** (6–6)	–	31,497	36–36	L5
73	June 23	@ Tigers	4–5 (10)	Ryan (3–2)	**Cishek** (2–4)	—	35,767	36–37	L6
74	June 24	Cardinals	4–3	**Roach** (1–0)	Rosenthal (2–3)	—	35,746	37–37	W1
75	June 25	Cardinals	5–4	**Karns** (6–2)	Leake (5–5)	**Cishek** (17)	40,431	38–37	W2
76	June 26	Cardinals	6–11	Siegrist (5–2)	**Vincent** (2–3)	—	35,955	38–38	L1
77	June 28	Pirates	5–2	**Iwakuma** (7–6)	Niese (6–6)	**Cishek** (18)	24,836	39–38	W1
78	June 29	Pirates	1–8	Taillon (2–1)	**Miley** (6–4)	—	25,477	39–39	L1
79	June 30	Orioles	5–3	**Walker** (4–6)	Tillman (10–2)	**Cishek** (19)	23,715	40–39	W1

July: 12–12 (Home: 6–3; Away: 6–9)

#	Date	Opponent	Score	Win	Loss	Save	Attendance	Record	Streak
80	July 1	Orioles	5–2	**LeBlanc** (1–0)	Gausman (1–6)	**Cishek** (20)	33,006	41–39	W2
81	July 2	Orioles	12–6	**Paxton** (2–3)	Wilson (4–6)	**Karns** (1)	29,362	42–39	W3
82	July 3	Orioles	9–4	**Iwakuma** (8–6)	Jiménez (5–8)	—	31,405	43–39	W4
83	July 4	@ Astros	1–2	McCullers (4–2)	**Miley** (6–5)	Harris (8)	29,844	43–40	L1
84	July 5	@ Astros	2–5	Keuchel (6–9)	**Walker** (4–7)	Harris (9)	21,553	43–41	L2
85	July 6	@ Astros	8–9	Giles (1–3)	**Díaz** (0–2)	Gregerson (14)	25,709	43–42	L3
86	July 7	@ Royals	3–4	Pounders (1–0)	**Cishek** (2–5)	—	31,425	43–43	L4
87	July 8	@ Royals	3–2	**Iwakuma** (9–6)	Ventura (6–7)	**Cishek** (21)	33,391	44–43	W1
88	July 9	@ Royals	3–5	Vólquez (8–8)	**Miley** (6–6)	Herrera (1)	30,659	44–44	L1
89	July 10	@ Royals	8–5	**Montgomery** (3–3)	Gee (3–3)	—	27,544	45–44	W1
**87th All-Star Game in San Diego, California**
90	July 15	Astros	3–7	Fister (9–6)	**Paxton** (2–4)	—	29,217	45–45	L1
91	July 16	Astros	1–0	**Iwakuma** (10–6)	McCullers (4–4)	**Cishek** (22)	41,386	46–45	W1
92	July 17	Astros	1–8	McHugh (6–6)	**Montgomery** (3–4)	—	27,322	46–46	L1
93	July 18	White Sox	4–3	**Rollins** (1–0)	Robertson (0–2)	—	20,598	47–46	W1
94	July 19	White Sox	1–6	Quintana (8–8)	**Miley** (6–7)	—	24,851	47–47	L1
95	July 20	White Sox	6–5 (11)	**Nuño** (1–1)	Jennings (3–2)	—	39,985	48–47	W1
96	July 22	@ Blue Jays	2–1	**Paxton** (3–4)	Estrada (5–4)	**Cishek** (23)	46,737	49–47	W2
97	July 23	@ Blue Jays	14–5	**Iwakuma** (11–6)	Dickey (7–11)	**LeBlanc** (1)	47,517	50–47	W3
98	July 24	@ Blue Jays	0–2	Happ (13–3)	**Miley** (6–8)	Osuna (20)	47,488	50–48	L1
99	July 26	@ Pirates	7–4	**Hernández** (5–4)	Liriano (6–10)	**Cishek** (24)	30,969	51–48	W1
100	July 27	@ Pirates	1–10	Cole (6–6)	**Paxton** (3–5)	—	35,483	51–49	L1
101	July 29	@ Cubs	1–12	Lester (11–4)	**Iwakuma** (11–7)	—	40,951	51–50	L2
102	July 30	@ Cubs	4–1	**Miley** (7–8)	Arrieta (12–5)	**Cishek** (25)	41,401	52–50	W1
103	July 31	@ Cubs	6–7 (12)	Rondon (2–2)	**Martin** (1–1)	—	40,952	52–51	L1

August: 16–14 (Home: 11–5; Away: 5–9)

#	Date	Opponent	Score	Win	Loss	Save	Attendance	Record	Streak
104	August 1	Red Sox	1–2	Tazawa (2–1)	**Cishek** (2–6)	Kimbrel (18)	29,601	52–52	L2
105	August 2	Red Sox	5–4	**Roach** (2–0)	Abad (1–5)	**Díaz** (1)	25,240	53–52	W1
106	August 3	Red Sox	3–1	**Iwakuma** (12–7)	Porcello (14–3)	**Díaz** (2)	24,494	54–52	W2
107	August 4	Red Sox	2–3 (11)	Kimbrel (2–3)	**Martin** (1–2)	Ziegler (21)	33,369	54–53	L1
108	August 5	Angels	6–4	**Hernández** (6–4)	Lincecum (2–6)	**Díaz** (3)	40,354	55–53	W1
109	August 6	Angels	8–6	**Storen** (2–3)	Valdez (0–1)	**Díaz** (4)	45,618	56–53	W2
110	August 7	Angels	3–1	**Paxton** (4–5)	Shoemaker (6–12)	**Wilhelmsen** (1)	44,812	57–53	W3
111	August 8	Tigers	3–0	**Iwakuma** (13–7)	Fulmer (9–3)	**Díaz** (5)	20,002	58–53	W4
112	August 9	Tigers	6–5 (15)	**Miranda** (1–0)	Rodríguez (1–3)	—	19,713	59–53	W5
113	August 10	Tigers	3–1	**Caminero** (2–2)	Wilson (2–4)	**Vincent** (2)	28,742	60–53	W6
114	August 12	@ Athletics	3–6	Manaea (4–7)	**Wieland** (0–1)	Madson (25)	14,073	60–54	L1
115	August 13	@ Athletics	4–3	**Iwakuma** (14–7)	Graveman (8–8)	**Díaz** (6)	35,067	61–54	W1
116	August 14	@ Athletics	8–4	**LeBlanc** (2–0)	Neal (2–2)	—	21,203	62–54	W2
117	August 15	@ Angels	3–2	**Hernández** (7–4)	Nolasco (4–10)	**Díaz** (7)	35,840	63–54	W3
118	August 16	@ Angels	6–7	Oberholtzer (3–2)	**Caminero** (2–3)	Salas (3)	37,546	63–55	L1
119	August 17	@ Angels	4–3	**Storen** (3–3)	Skaggs (1–2)	**Díaz** (8)	36,950	64–55	W1
120	August 18	@ Angels	4–6	Shoemaker (7–13)	**Iwakuma** (14–8)	—	37,721	64–56	L1
121	August 19	Brewers	7–6	**LeBlanc** (3–0)	Suter (0–1)	**Díaz** (9)	37,758	65–56	W1
122	August 20	Brewers	8–2	**Hernández** (8–4)	Peralta (5–9)	—	29,170	66–56	W2
123	August 21	Brewers	6–7	Thornburg (5–4)	**Wilhelmsen** (2–4)	–	35,833	66–57	L1
124	August 22	Yankees	7–5	**Vincent** (3–3)	Swarzak (1–2)	**Díaz** (10)	24,384	67–57	W1
125	August 23	Yankees	1–5	Sabathia (8–10)	**Walker** (4–8)	—	24,628	67–58	L1
126	August 24	Yankees	0–5	Tanaka (11–4)	**Iwakuma** (14–9)	—	41,536	67–59	L2
127	August 25	@ White Sox	6–7	Robertson (4–2)	**Vincent** (3–4)	—	19,072	67–60	L3
128	August 26	@ White Sox	3–1	**Hernández** (9–4)	Sale (15–7)	**Díaz** (11)	25,651	68–60	W1
129	August 27	@ White Sox	3–9	Quintana (11–9)	**Miranda** (1–1)	—	27,318	68–61	L1
130	August 28	@ White Sox	1–4	Rodon (5–8)	**Walker** (4–9)	Robertson (33)	25,538	68–62	L2
131	August 29	@ Rangers	3–6	Darvish (5–3)	**Iwakuma** (14–10)	Dyson (30)	22,972	68–63	L3
132	August 30	@ Rangers	7–8	Bush (6–2)	**Díaz** (0–3)	—	26,950	68–64	L4
133	August 31	@ Rangers	1–14	Pérez (9–10)	**Hernández** (9–5)	—	21,309	68–65	L5

September: 18–9 (Home: 8–7; Away: 10–2)

#	Date	Opponent	Score	Win	Loss	Save	Attendance	Record	Streak
134	September 2	Angels	11–8	**Miranda** (2–1)	Oberholtzer (3–3)	**Díaz** (12)	16,775	69–65	W1
135	September 3	Angels	3–10	Skaggs (3–3)	**Walker** (4–10)	—	20,357	69–66	L1
136	September 4	Angels	2–4	Guerra (3–0)	**Iwakuma** (14–11)	Bailey (1)	24,033	69–67	L2
137	September 5	Rangers	14–6	**Hernández** (10–5)	Hamels (14–5)	—	23,618	70–67	W1
138	September 6	Rangers	7–10	Pérez (10–10)	**Paxton** (4–6)	Dyson (32)	14,615	70–68	L1
139	September 7	Rangers	8–3	**Miranda** (3–1)	Griffin (7–4)	—	15,434	71–68	W1
140	September 8	Rangers	6–3	**Walker** (5–10)	Holland (7–7)	**Díaz** (13)	17,493	72–68	W2
141	September 9	@ Athletics	3–2	**Iwakuma** (15–11)	Mengden (1–7)	**Díaz** (14)	19,385	73–68	W3
142	September 10	@ Athletics	14–3	**Hernández** (11–5)	Graveman (10–10)	—	18,438	74–68	W4
143	September 11	@ Athletics	3–2	**Cishek** (3–6)	Madson (5–5)	**Díaz** (15)	13,610	75–68	W5
144	September 12	@ Angels	8–1	**Miranda** (4–1)	Nolasco (5–14)	—	29,932	76–68	W6
145	September 13	@ Angels	8–0	**Walker** (6–10)	Meyer (0–3)	—	32,139	77–68	W7
146	September 14	@ Angels	2–1	**Iwakuma** (16–11)	Valdez (1–3)	**Díaz** (16)	33,501	78–68	W8
147	September 16	Astros	0–6	McHugh (11–10)	**Hernández** (11–6)	—	30,178	78–69	L1
148	September 17	Astros	1–2	Fiers (11–7)	**Paxton** (4–7)	Giles (11)	32,304	78–70	L2
149	September 18	Astros	7–3	**Miranda** (5–1)	Fister (12–12)	—	25,383	79–70	W1
150	September 19	Blue Jays	2–3	Estrada (9–9)	**Walker** (6–11)	Osuna (34)	34,809	79–71	L1
151	September 20	Blue Jays	2–10	Happ (20–4)	**Iwakuma** (16–12)	—	33,573	79–72	L2
152	September 21	Blue Jays	2–1 (12)	**Vincent** (4–4)	Dickey (10–15)	—	39,595	80–72	W1
153	September 23	@ Twins	10–1	**Paxton** (5–7)	Gibson (6–11)	—	22,683	81–72	W2
154	September 24	@ Twins	2–3	Duffey (9–11)	**Miranda** (5–2)	Kintzler (15)	24,749	81–73	L1
155	September 25	@ Twins	4–3	**Walker** (7–11)	Santiago (12–10)	**Díaz** (17)	22,092	82–73	W1
156	September 26	@ Astros	4–3 (11)	**Storen** (4–3)	Gregerson (4–3)	**Vincent** (3)	24,107	83–73	W2
157	September 27	@ Astros	4–8	Gustave (1–0)	**Hernandez** (11–7)	—	23,499	83–74	L1
158	September 28	@ Astros	12–4	**Paxton** (6–7)	Fister (12–13)	—	21,187	84–74	W1
159	September 29	Athletics	3–2	**Cishek** (4–6)	Hendriks (0–4)	**Díaz** (18)	19,796	85–74	W2
160	September 30	Athletics	5–1	**Walker** (8–11)	Alcántara (1–3)	—	24,088	86–74	W3

October: 0–2 (Home: 0–2; Away: 0–0)

#	Date	Opponent	Score	Win	Loss	Save	Attendance	Record	Streak
161	October 1	Athletics	8–9 (10)	Madson (6–7)	**Díaz** (0–4)	—	29,522	86–75	L1
162	October 2	Athletics	2–3	Manaea (7–9)	**Hernández** (11–8)	Axford (3)	24,856	86–76	L2

Legend: = Win = Loss = Postponement
Bold = Mariners team member

== Roster ==
2016 Seattle Mariners
Roster
Pitchers: 53 Dan Altavilla; 49 Jonathan Aro; 53 Joaquín Benoit; 48 Arquimedes Caminero; 31 Steve Cishek; 39 Edwin Díaz; 48 Mayckol Guaipe; 34 Félix Hernández; 18 Hisashi Iwakuma; 52 Steve Johnson; 13 Nate Karns; 35 Wade LeBlanc; 57 Cody Martin; 20 Wade Miley; 37 Ariel Miranda; 37 Mike Montgomery; 38 Vidal Nuño; 53 Blake Parker; 65 James Paxton; 62 Joel Peralta; 63 Donn Roach; 59 David Rollins; 25 Adrian Sampson; 58 Evan Scribner; 45 Drew Storen; 61 Pat Venditte; 50 Nick Vincent; 44 Taijuan Walker; 47 Joe Wieland; 54 Tom Wilhelmsen; 55 Tony Zych	Catchers: 32 Steve Clevenger; 33 Chris Iannetta; 2 Jesús Sucre; 3 Mike Zunino; Infielders: 22 Robinson Canó; 6 Mike Freeman; 10 Dae-ho Lee; 26 Adam Lind; 4 Ketel Marte; 36 Shawn O'Malley; 16 Luis Sardiñas; 15 Kyle Seager; 1 Chris Taylor; 20 Dan Vogelbach	Outfielders: 8 Nori Aoki; 23 Nelson Cruz; 16 Ben Gamel; 21 Franklin Gutiérrez; 5 Guillermo Heredia; 12 Leonys Martín; 99 Dan Robertson; 17 Stefen Romero; 7 Seth Smith	Manager: 9 Scott Servais; Coaches: 14 Manny Acta (third base); 27 Tim Bogar (bench); 43 Casey Candaele (first base); 46 Mike Hampton (bullpen); 11 Edgar Martínez (hitting); 30 Mel Stottlemyre Jr. (pitching); 88 Chris Prieto (quality control); 66 Fleming Baez (bullpen catcher); 89 Nasuel Cabrera (batting practice pitcher)

== Statistics ==
=== Batting ===
(final statistics)

Players in bold are on the active roster.

Note: G = Games played; AB = At bats; R = Runs; H = Hits; 2B = Doubles; 3B = Triples; HR = Home runs; RBI = Runs batted in; Avg. = Batting average; OBP = On-base percentage; SLG = Slugging percentage; SB = Stolen bases

Player	G	AB	R	H	2B	3B	HR	RBI	AVG	OBP	SLG	SB
**Norichika Aoki**	118	417	63	118	24	4	4	28	.283	.349	.388	7
**Robinson Canó**	161	655	107	195	33	2	39	103	.298	.350	.533	0
Steve Clevenger	22	68	7	15	3	0	1	7	.221	.303	.309	0
**Nelson Cruz**	155	589	96	169	27	1	43	105	.287	.360	.555	0
**Edwin Díaz**	49	1	0	0	0	0	0	0	.000	.000	.000	0
**Mike Freeman**	13	13	1	5	1	0	0	1	.385	.385	.462	0
**Ben Gamel**	27	40	8	8	2	0	1	5	.200	.289	.325	0
**Franklin Gutiérrez**	98	248	33	61	9	0	14	39	.246	.329	.452	1
**Guillermo Heredia**	45	92	12	23	3	0	1	12	.250	.349	.315	1
**Félix Hernández**	25	6	0	0	0	0	0	0	.000	.000	.000	0
**Chris Iannetta**	94	295	23	62	14	0	7	24	.210	.303	.329	0
**Hisashi Iwakuma**	33	3	2	0	0	0	0	0	.000	.000	.000	0
Nate Karns	22	1	0	0	0	0	0	0	.000	.000	.000	0
**Dae-ho Lee**	104	292	33	74	9	0	14	49	.253	.312	.428	0
**Adam Lind**	126	401	48	96	17	0	20	58	.239	.286	.431	0
**Ketel Marte**	119	437	55	113	21	2	1	33	.259	.287	.323	11
**Leonys Martín**	143	518	72	128	17	3	15	47	.247	.306	.278	24
Wade Miley	19	7	1	1	0	0	0	0	.143	.143	.143	0
**Shawn O'Malley**	89	210	24	48	9	2	2	17	.229	.299	.319	6
**James Paxton**	20	3	0	0	0	0	0	0	.000	.250	.000	0
Joel Peralta	26	1	0	0	0	0	0	0	.000	.000	.000	0
Daniel Robertson	9	19	1	5	1	0	0	1	.263	.300	.316	0
Stefen Romero	9	17	1	4	1	0	0	3	.235	.263	.294	0
Luis Sardiñas	29	66	11	12	0	0	2	5	.182	.206	.273	1
**Kyle Seager**	158	597	89	166	36	3	30	99	.278	.359	.499	3
**Seth Smith**	137	378	62	94	15	0	16	63	.249	.342	.415	0
**Jesús Sucre**	9	25	4	12	2	0	1	5	.480	.552	.680	0
Chris Taylor	2	3	0	1	0	0	0	0	.333	.333	.333	0
**Dan Vogelbach**	8	12	0	1	0	0	0	0	.083	.154	.083	0
**Mike Zunino**	55	164	16	34	7	0	12	31	.207	.318	.470	0
**Team totals**	**162**	**5583**	**768**	**1446**	**251**	**17**	**223**	**735**	**.259**	**.326**	**.430**	**56**

=== Pitching ===
(final statistics)

Players in bold are on the active roster.

Note: W = Wins; L = Losses; ERA = Earned run average; G = Games pitched; GS = Games started; SV = Saves; IP = Innings pitched; H = Hits allowed; R = Runs allowed; ER = Earned runs allowed; BB = Walks allowed; K = Strikeouts

Player	W	L	ERA	G	GS	SV	IP	H	R	ER	BB	K
**Dan Altavilla**	0	0	0.73	15	0	0	12.1	11	1	1	1	10
Jonathan Aro	0	0	0.00	1	0	0	0.2	1	0	0	1	0
Joaquin Benoit	1	1	5.18	26	0	0	24.1	20	16	14	15	28
**Arquimedes Caminero**	1	1	3.66	18	0	0	19.2	21	14	8	11	18
**Steve Cishek**	4	6	2.81	62	0	25	64.0	44	21	20	21	76
**Edwin Díaz**	0	4	2.79	49	0	18	51.2	45	16	16	15	88
Mayckol Guaipe	0	0	4.91	5	0	0	7.1	8	6	4	4	5
**Félix Hernández**	11	8	3.82	25	25	0	153.1	138	76	65	65	122
**Hisashi Iwakuma**	16	12	4.12	33	33	0	199.0	218	95	91	46	147
Steve Johnson	1	0	4.32	16	0	0	16.2	13	8	8	11	17
Nate Karns	6	2	5.15	22	15	1	94.1	95	55	54	45	101
Wade LeBlanc	3	0	4.50	11	8	1	50.0	52	27	25	9	41
**Cody Martin**	1	2	3.86	9	2	0	25.2	28	11	11	9	15
Wade Miley	7	8	4.98	19	19	0	112.0	117	62	62	34	82
**Ariel Miranda**	5	2	3.54	11	10	0	56.0	43	25	22	18	40
Mike Montgomery	3	4	2.34	32	2	0	61.2	49	18	16	18	54
**Vidal Nuño**	1	1	3.53	55	1	0	58.2	67	23	23	11	51
Blake Parker	0	0	0.00	1	0	0	1.0	1	0	0	1	0
**James Paxton**	6	7	3.79	20	20	0	121.0	134	62	51	24	117
Joel Peralta	1	0	5.40	26	0	0	23.1	24	14	14	7	28
Donn Roach	2	0	8.44	4	0	0	5.1	7	5	5	2	2
**David Rollins**	1	0	7.71	11	0	0	9.1	12	8	8	7	6
Adrian Sampson	0	1	7.71	1	1	0	4.2	8	4	4	1	2
Luis Sardiñas	0	0	0.00	1	0	0	1.0	0	0	0	0	0
**Evan Scribner**	0	0	0.00	12	0	0	14.0	5	0	0	2	15
**Drew Storen**	3	0	3.44	19	0	0	18.1	13	7	7	3	16
**Pat Venditte**	0	0	6.08	7	0	0	13.1	13	10	9	7	12
**Nick Vincent**	4	4	3.73	60	0	3	60.1	53	26	25	15	65
**Taijuan Walker**	8	11	4.22	25	25	0	134.1	129	75	63	37	119
Joe Wieland	0	1	10.80	1	1	0	5.0	9	6	6	0	3
**Tom Wilhelmsen**	0	0	3.60	29	0	1	25.0	22	10	10	10	17
Tony Zych	1	0	3.29	12	0	0	13.2	10	6	5	10	21
**Team totals**	**86**	**76**	**4.00**	**162**	**162**	**49**	**1457.0**	**1410**	**707**	**647**	**460**	**1318**

== Farm system ==
Level	Team	League	Manager
AAA	Tacoma Rainiers	Pacific Coast League	Pat Listach
AA	Jackson Generals	Southern League	Daren Brown
A-Advanced	Bakersfield Blaze	California League	Eddie Menchaca
A	Clinton LumberKings	Midwest League	Mitch Canham
A-Short Season	Everett AquaSox	Northwest League	Rob Mummau
Rookie	AZL Mariners	Arizona League	Zac Livingston
Rookie	DSL Mariners	Dominican Summer League	

LEAGUE CHAMPIONS: Jackson, AZL Mariners
