= Tomás Telis =

Venezuelan baseball player (born 1991)

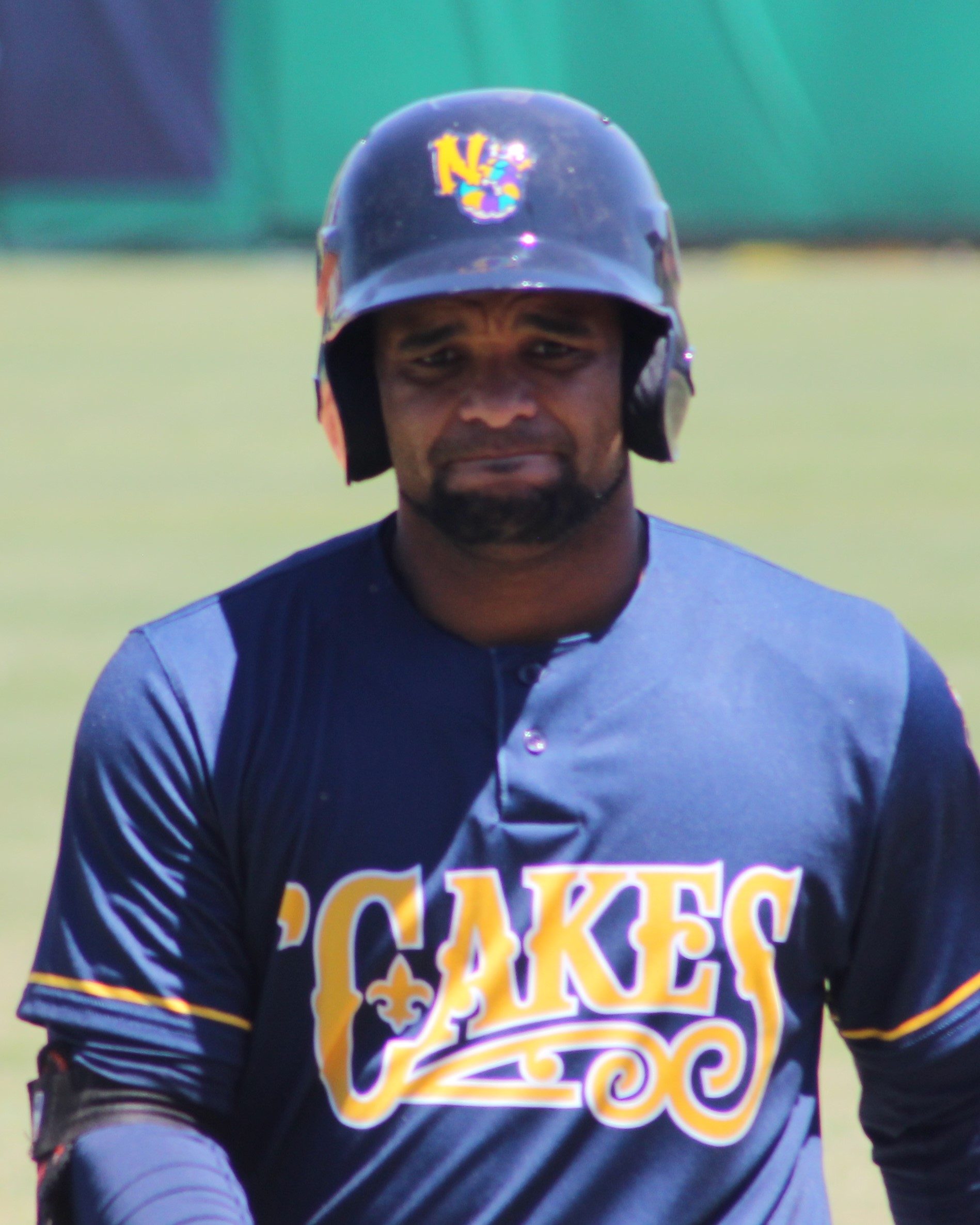
- Telis with the New Orleans Baby Cakes in 2017

Toros de Tijuana – No. 20
- Catcher
- Born: June 18, 1991 (age 35); El Tigre, Venezuela
- Batted: Switch Threw: Right

MLB debut
- August 25, 2014, for the Texas Rangers

Last MLB appearance
- April 27, 2018, for the Miami Marlins

MLB statistics
- Batting average: .230
- Home runs: 1
- Runs batted in: 24
- Stats at Baseball Reference

Teams
- Texas Rangers (2014–2015); Miami Marlins (2015–2018)

Tomás Telis (born June 18, 1991) is a Venezuelan professional baseball catcher for the Toros de Tijuana of the Mexican League. He has previously played in Major League Baseball (MLB) for the Texas Rangers and Miami Marlins.

== Career ==
=== Texas Rangers ===
Telis signed with the Texas Rangers as an international free agent on July 2, 2007 as a shortstop and was moved to catcher. He made his professional debut in 2008 with the DSL Rangers. He split the 2009 season between the rookie ball AZL Rangers and the Low-A Spokane Indians, batting .330/.340/.498 between the two clubs. In 2010, Telis spent the year with the AZL Rangers, hitting .326/.351/.431 in 37 games. In 2011, Telis played for the Single-A Hickory Crawdads, slashing .297/.329/.430 with career-highs in home runs (11) and RBI (69). In 2012, Telis played in High-A with the Myrtle Beach Pelicans, posting a .247/.283/.331 batting line in 117 games. Telis spent the 2013 season with the Double-A Frisco RoughRiders, slashing .264/290/.353 with 4 home runs and 43 RBI in 91 games. Telis was assigned to the Triple-A Round Rock Express to begin the 2014 season.

Telis was called up to the majors for the first time on August 25, 2014. He made his debut that day against the Seattle Mariners as the starting catcher, and notched his first major league hit in the game, a bunt single off of Brandon Maurer. Telis appeared in 18 games for the Rangers, collecting 8 RBI's in 68 at bats.

=== Miami Marlins ===
On July 31, 2015, Telis was traded to the Miami Marlins, along with Cody Ege, for Sam Dyson. He finished the 2015 season between the Triple-A New Orleans Zephyrs and the Marlins, collecting 4 hits in 27 at-bats for the major league club. In 2016, Telis spent the majority of the season in New Orleans, but played in 10 games with Miami, notching 4 hits in 13 at-bats. In 2017, Telis played in 48 games for the Marlins, batting .240/.279/.346 with 9 RBI. After getting off to a .207/.258/.241 start in 2018, Telis was designated for assignment on April 28, 2018. He cleared waivers and was outrighted to the New Orleans Baby Cakes. Telis spent the remainder of the year in Triple-A and elected free agency on November 2, 2018.

=== Minnesota Twins ===
On January 9, 2019, Telis signed a minor league deal with the Minnesota Twins. He was assigned to the Triple–A Rochester Red Wings to start the 2019 season, with whom he batted .330/.364/.490 in 82 games. On November 6, 2019, Telis re-signed with the Twins on a new minor league contract. Telis did not play in a game in 2020 due to the cancellation of the minor league season because of the COVID-19 pandemic. He again re-signed with the Twins on a minor league contract on November 2, 2020.

On April 21, 2021, Telis was selected to the active roster. However, on April 23, Telis was removed from the 40-man roster without making an appearance for the Twins and was assigned to the Triple-A St. Paul Saints. Telis spent the 2021 season with the Triple-A St. Paul Saints. He played in 101 games, hitting .296 with 12 home runs and 50 RBI's. Telis became a free agent following the season.

=== Los Angeles Dodgers ===
On December 24, 2021, Telis signed a minor league contract with the Los Angeles Dodgers. He played in 80 games for the Triple-A Oklahoma City Dodgers, batting .287/.365/.342 with 2 home runs and 36 RBI. He elected free agency following the season on November 10, 2022.

=== Tecolotes de los Dos Laredos ===
On March 8, 2023, Telis signed with the Tecolotes de los Dos Laredos of the Mexican League. In 65 games for the Tecolotes, Telis hit .332/.381/.387 with 2 home runs and 33 RBI.

=== Guerreros de Oaxaca ===
On December 27, 2023, Telis was loaned to the Guerreros de Oaxaca of the Mexican League. In 14 games for Oaxaca, he hit .227/.333/.296 with no home runs and five RBI. On May 10, 2024, Telis was released by the Guerreros.

=== Rieleros de Aguascalientes ===
On May 14, 2024, Telis signed with the Rieleros de Aguascalientes of the Mexican League. In 48 games for Aguascalientes, he slashed .338/.398/.408 with one home run and 23 RBI.

=== Toros de Tijuana ===
On October 1, 2024, Telis was traded to the Toros de Tijuana of the Mexican League in exchange for Saúl Garza. In 64 games he hit .279/.368/.393 with 4 home runs and 31 RBIs.

== See also ==
- List of Major League Baseball players from Venezuela
