= Juan Graterol =

Venezuelan baseball player (born 1989)

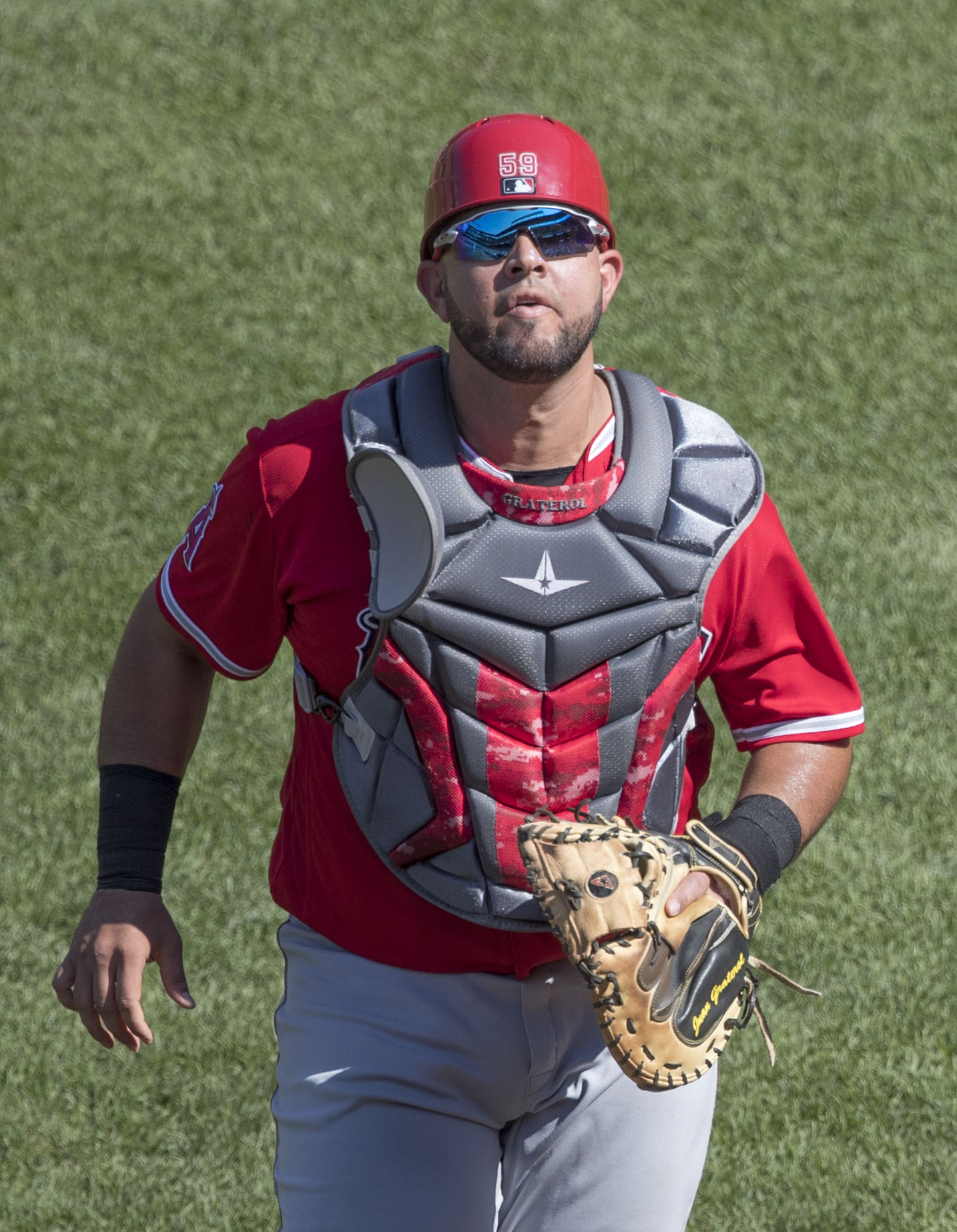
- Graterol with the Los Angeles Angels in 2017

Kansas City Royals – No. 83
- Catcher
- Born: February 14, 1989 (age 37); Maracay, Aragua, Venezuela
- Batted: Right Threw: Right

MLB debut
- September 2, 2016, for the Los Angeles Angels

Last MLB appearance
- September 16, 2019, for the Cincinnati Reds

MLB statistics
- Batting average: .218
- Home runs: 0
- Runs batted in: 14
- Stats at Baseball Reference

Teams
- As player: Los Angeles Angels (2016–2018); Minnesota Twins (2018); Cincinnati Reds (2019); As coach: Kansas City Royals (2025–present)

Juan Jose Graterol Montevideo (born February 14, 1989) is a Venezuelan former professional baseball catcher who currently serves as a strategist and bullpen catcher for the Kansas City Royals of Major League Baseball (MLB). He played in MLB for the Los Angeles Angels, Minnesota Twins, and Cincinnati Reds.

== Early life ==
Graterol was born in Maracay, Venezuela.

== Playing career ==
=== Kansas City Royals ===
Graterol was signed as an undrafted international free agent by scout Juan Indriago in 2005, and began his professional career in the Kansas City Royals organization. As a 17 year old for the Royals' Dominican League team, Graterol slashed .296/.386/.349. In 2007, playing for the rookie-ball Burlington Royals, Graterol's production tanked as he hit only .225/.292/.235, but bettered his production the next year playing for the Idaho Falls Chukars, as he batted .276/.366/.316. Graterol spent the majority of the next two season with the Single-A Burlington Bees, batting a solid .300/.343/.340. That season, he also made it as high as the advanced Single-A Wilmington Blue Rocks, only appearing in 3 games for the team. Through his first 4 years as a professional player, Graterol managed a .278/.349/.315 batting line with no home runs or triples, and only 21 doubles. In 2011, Graterol split the season between the Kane County Cougars and Wilmington, but his production hit a wall as he batted only .195/.255/.235, however he did hit his first professional home run with Wilmington.

In 2012, Graterol spent the entire season with Wilmington, with great production as he hit .301/.338/.393. On May 12, 2013, while playing for the Double-A Northwest Arkansas Naturals, Graterol hit the game-deciding home run in a 5–4 victory against the Springfield Cardinals in a game that had lasted 20 innings. The game, which lasted 5 hours and 38 minutes was the longest in Naturals history. He ended the season batting .286/.314/.368 with 3 home runs and 17 RBI. Graterol was invited to Spring Training with the Royals for the 2014 season. In 2014, Graterol reached Triple-A for the first time, appearing in 7 games for the Omaha Storm Chasers, but spent the majority of the season with Northwest Arkansas as he hit .278/.307/.387 between the two teams.

=== New York Yankees ===
On December 10, 2014, Graterol signed a minor league contract with the New York Yankees organization. Graterol split the season between the Single-A Charleston RiverDogs, the Double-A Trenton Thunder, and the Triple-A Scranton/Wilkes-Barre RailRiders, hitting a meager .198/.235/.250 between the three teams. He became a free agent on November 6, 2015.

=== Los Angeles Angels ===
Graterol signed a minor league contract with the Los Angeles Angels of Anaheim on January 12, 2016, and was promoted to the major leagues for the first time on July 18. After Graterol was with the Angels for five days he was optioned to the minor leagues, without having appeared in a game, briefly becoming a phantom ballplayer. Graterol was called up and made his major league debut on September 2, and had 14 major league at bats in the season. He was designated for assignment by the Angels on November 22.

=== Toronto Blue Jays ===
On November 28, 2016, the Cincinnati Reds claimed Graterol off waivers. He was claimed off waivers by the Arizona Diamondbacks on December 24. Arizona designated Graterol for assignment on January 13, 2017, after signing Chris Iannetta. The Los Angeles Angels claimed Graterol off waivers on January 19. The Toronto Blue Jays subsequently claimed Graterol off waivers on January 23. He made four appearances for the Triple-A Buffalo Bisons, going 6-for-14 (.429) with one walk. Graterol was designated for assignment by Toronto following the promotion of Chris Coghlan on April 14.

=== Los Angeles Angels (second stint) ===
On April 18, 2017, Graterol was traded back to the Los Angeles Angels in exchange for cash or a player to be named later. He made 48 appearances for Los Angeles, batting .202/.207/.250 with no home runs and 10 RBI across 84 at-bats.

Graterol was designated for assignment following the promotion of Miguel Almonte on April 4, 2018. He cleared waivers and was sent outright to the Triple-A Salt Lake Bees on April 7. On May 4, the Angels selected Graterol's contract after Martín Maldonado was placed on the bereavement list. He made only one appearance for the team, recording a single in his only plate appearance. Graterol was designated for assignment by the Angels on June 19, and released on June 24.

=== Minnesota Twins ===
On June 28, 2018, Graterol signed a minor league contract with the Minnesota Twins. In 34 appearances for the Triple-A Rochester Red Wings, he batted .284/.317/.336 with 10 RBI. On September 22, the Twins selected Graterol's contract, adding him to their active roster. In the majors with the Twins, he batted .143/.250/.143 in seven at-bats.

=== Cincinnati Reds ===
On October 10, 2018, Graterol was claimed off waivers by the Cincinnati Reds. He was non-tendered by Cincinnati on November 30, and became a free agent. On December 3, Graterol re-signed with Cincinnati on a minor league contract.

Graterol began the 2019 season with the Triple-A Louisville Bats. On July 17, 2019, the Reds selected Graterol's contract, adding him to their active roster. In six appearances for Cincinnati, he went 4-for-18 (.222) with one RBI. On October 16, Graterol was designated for assignment by the Reds. He cleared waivers and was sent outright to Louisville on October 18. Graterol elected free agency on October 21.

=== Toronto Blue Jays (second stint) ===
On November 26, 2019, Graterol signed a minor league contract with the Minnesota Twins. Graterol did not play in a game in 2020 due to the cancellation of the minor league season because of the COVID-19 pandemic. He became a free agent on November 2, 2020.

On December 30, 2020, Graterol signed a minor league contract with the Los Angeles Angels organization. On March 31, 2021, Graterol was traded to the Toronto Blue Jays in exchange for cash considerations and assigned to the Triple–A Buffalo Bisons on May 3. In 50 appearances for the Bisons, he batted .293/.355/.359 with two home runs and 21 RBI. Graterol elected free agency following the season on November 7.

=== Arizona Diamondbacks ===
On November 13, 2021, Graterol signed a minor league contract with the Arizona Diamondbacks. In 38 games for the Triple–A Reno Aces, he batted .256/.299/.358 with two home runs, 13 RBI, and a career–high three stolen bases. Graterol was released by the Diamondbacks organization on August 1, 2022.

=== Lake Country DockHounds ===
On August 26, 2023, Graterol signed with the Lake Country DockHounds of the American Association of Professional Baseball. In eight appearances for Lake Country, he batted .387/.406/.516 with one home run and five RBI. Graterol became a free agent at the end of the season.

== Coaching career ==
Prior to the 2025 season, Graterol was hired to serve as a strategist and bullpen catcher for the Kansas City Royals.

== See also ==
- List of Major League Baseball players from Venezuela
