= Greg Mahle =

American baseball player (born 1993)

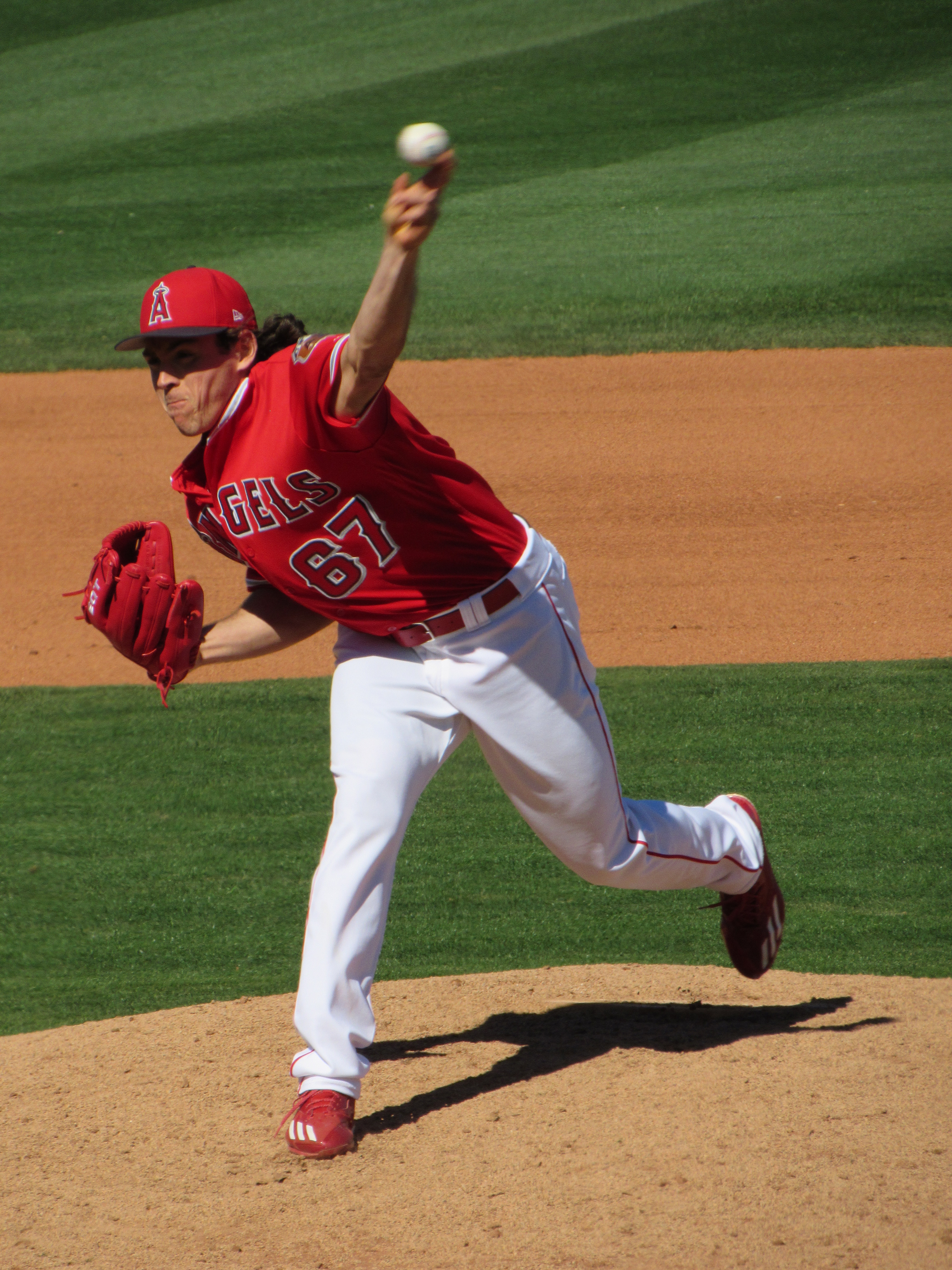
- Mahle during spring training in 2017
- Pitcher
- Born: April 17, 1993 (age 33); Westminster, California, U.S.
- Batted: Left Threw: Left

MLB debut
- April 13, 2016, for the Los Angeles Angels

Last MLB appearance
- June 8, 2016, for the Los Angeles Angels

MLB statistics
- Win–loss record: 1–0
- Earned run average: 5.40
- Strikeouts: 14
- Stats at Baseball Reference

Teams
- Los Angeles Angels (2016)

Gregory Norman Mahle (born April 17, 1993) is an American former professional baseball pitcher. He played in Major League Baseball (MLB) for the Los Angeles Angels. He attended the University of California, Santa Barbara, where he played college baseball for the UC Santa Barbara Gauchos team.

Mahle was named a Louisville Slugger Freshman All-American after his 2012 collegiate season. The Angels selected him 449th in the 2014 Major League Baseball draft.

== Early life and education ==
Mahle attended Westminster High School in Westminster, California. Playing for the school's varsity baseball for his last three years of high school as a two-way player, on varsity he recorded a .372 batting average, 73 hits and 3 career home runs, while winning 13 games on the mound, recording a 1.21 earned run average (ERA) and 122 career strikeouts.

Mahle enrolled at the University of California, Santa Barbara to play college baseball for the UC Santa Barbara Gauchos, As a freshman in 2012, Mahle pitched 46 1/3 innings for a 3–4 win–loss record and a 3.88 ERA. As a hitter, Mahle recorded a .347 batting average with 66 total hits, which helped him earn a spot on the Louisville Slugger Freshman All-American team along with Second Team All-Big West Conference team.

As a sophomore in 2013, he pitched 61 innings recording a 7–5 record with two saves and a 4.28 ERA, helping the UC Santa Barbara Gauchos get to a regional for the first time since 2001.

As a junior in 2014, Mahle pitched 70 innings earning a 6–5 win-loss record with one save and a 2.70 ERA. He batted .345 while striking out twice for the entire season.

== Professional career ==
=== Los Angeles Angels ===
The Los Angeles Angels selected Mahle in the 15th round, with the 449th pick, of the 2014 Major League Baseball draft. Shortly after signing, he began his professional career with the Orem Owlz of the Rookie Pioneer League where he did not allow a run in eight innings. Mahle was then promoted to the Burlington Bees which are in the Low–A Midwest League, where he recorded a 3.38 ERA while allowing only 20 hits in 20 innings pitched.

On April 11, 2016, Mahle was selected to the 40-man and active rosters. On April 13, Mahle made his MLB debut, pitching one scoreless inning with one strikeout against the Oakland Athletics. In 24 games for the Angels, Mahle recorded a 5.40 ERA with 14 strikeouts. On April 29, 2017, Mahle was designated for assignment by the Angels after allowing 11 runs in 18 1/3 innings of work. He cleared waivers and was sent outright to the Triple–A Salt Lake Bees on May 3.

Mahle split the rest of 2017 between the Double–A Mobile BayBears and Triple–A Salt Lake, pitching to a cumulative 10–4 record and 4.77 ERA. In 2018, Mahle again split the year between Mobile and Salt Lake, recording a 6–4 record and 4.67 ERA in 43 games. In 2019, Mahle split the season between Mobile and Salt Lake, registering a 4–7 record and a 4.41 ERA in 87 2/3 innings of work. On October 15, 2019, Mahle was released by the Angels.

=== Sugar Land Lightning Sloths ===
On December 19, 2019, Mahle signed with the Toros de Tijuana of the Mexican League for the 2020 season. However, the season was later canceled due to the COVID-19 pandemic and he became a free agent. In July 2020, Mahle signed on to play for the Sugar Land Lightning Sloths of the Constellation Energy League (a makeshift 4-team independent league created as a result of the COVID-19 pandemic) for the 2020 season.

=== Tecolotes de los Dos Laredos ===
On February 12, 2021, Mahle was traded to the Tecolotes de los Dos Laredos of the Mexican League. In 3 starts for Dos Laredos, Mahle compiled a 6.75 ERA with 10 strikeouts across 14 2/3 innings pitched. He did not appear in a game in either the 2022 or 2023 seasons.

=== Kane County Cougars ===
On June 12, 2024, Mahle signed the Kane County Cougars of the American Association of Professional Baseball. Mahle appeared in 15 games for Kane County, going 10–2 with a 2.94 ERA and 65 strikeouts across 82 2/3 innings pitched. His contributions helped the Cougars win the Miles Wolff Cup over the Winnipeg Goldeyes, their first since joining the American Association in 2021 and their third Championship in franchise history. He became a free agent following the season.

== Personal life ==
Mahle's brother, Tyler Mahle, also plays professional baseball.
