= Daniel Wright (baseball) =

American baseball player (born 1991)

- Pitcher
- Born: April 3, 1991 (age 35); Bartlett, Tennessee, U.S.
- Batted: Right Threw: Right

MLB debut
- May 24, 2016, for the Cincinnati Reds

Last MLB appearance
- June 15, 2017, for the Los Angeles Angels

Career statistics
- Win–loss record: 1–6
- Earned run average: 5.61
- Strikeouts: 32
- Stats at Baseball Reference

Teams
- Cincinnati Reds (2016); Los Angeles Angels (2016–2017)

Daniel Paul Wright (born April 3, 1991) is an American former professional baseball pitcher. He played in Major League Baseball (MLB) for the Cincinnati Reds and Los Angeles Angels.

== Career ==
Wright attended Bartlett High School in Bartlett, Tennessee, and played college baseball at Arkansas State University, along with two summers for the Newport Gulls of the NECBL in 2011 and 2012.

=== Cincinnati Reds ===
Wright was drafted by the Cincinnati Reds in the 10th round, with the 315th overall selection, of the 2013 Major League Baseball draft. He made his professional debut with the rookie–level Billings Mustangs, posting a 5.91 ERA in 14 games.

Wright split the 2014 season between the Single–A Dayton Dragons and High–A Bakersfield Blaze. In 28 games (25 starts) between the two affiliates, he accumulated a 14–7 record and 3.54 ERA with 141 strikeouts across 152 1/3 innings pitched.

Wright spent the 2015 campaign with the Double–A Pensacola Blue Wahoos, making 27 starts and compiling a 10–11 record and 4.53 ERA with 130 strikeouts across 155 innings. He began the 2016 season with the Triple–A Louisville Bats, recording an 0.79 ERA with 32 strikeouts across 10 outings.

On May 24, 2016, Wright was selected to the 40-man roster and promoted to the major leagues for the first time. He went 5 1/3 innings in his debut against the Los Angeles Dodgers, taking the loss as he allowed 4 runs (3 earned) on 7 hits with 4 strikeouts. In 4 games (2 starts) for Cincinnati, he logged a 7.62 ERA with 6 strikeouts in 13 innings of work. On September 4, Wright was designated for assignment by the Reds.

=== Los Angeles Angels ===
On September 4, 2016, the same day he was cut by the Reds, Wright was claimed off waivers by the Los Angeles Angels. He made 5 starts for the club down the stretch, registering a 5.40 ERA with 15 strikeouts across 26 2/3 innings pitched.

Wright made five more appearances for the Angels in 2017, recording a 4.58 ERA with 11 strikeouts across 19 2/3 innings. He was designated for assignment by Los Angeles on September 4, 2017. Wright elected free agency after the season on October 13.

=== Cincinnati Reds (second stint) ===
On December 19, 2017, Wright signed a minor league contract with the Cincinnati Reds organization. In 28 starts for the Double–A Pensacola Blue Wahoos, he registered a 7–10 record and 4.16 ERA with 106 strikeouts across 151 1/3 innings pitched. Wright elected free agency following the season on November 2, 2018.
