= Cody Ege =

American baseball player (born 1991)

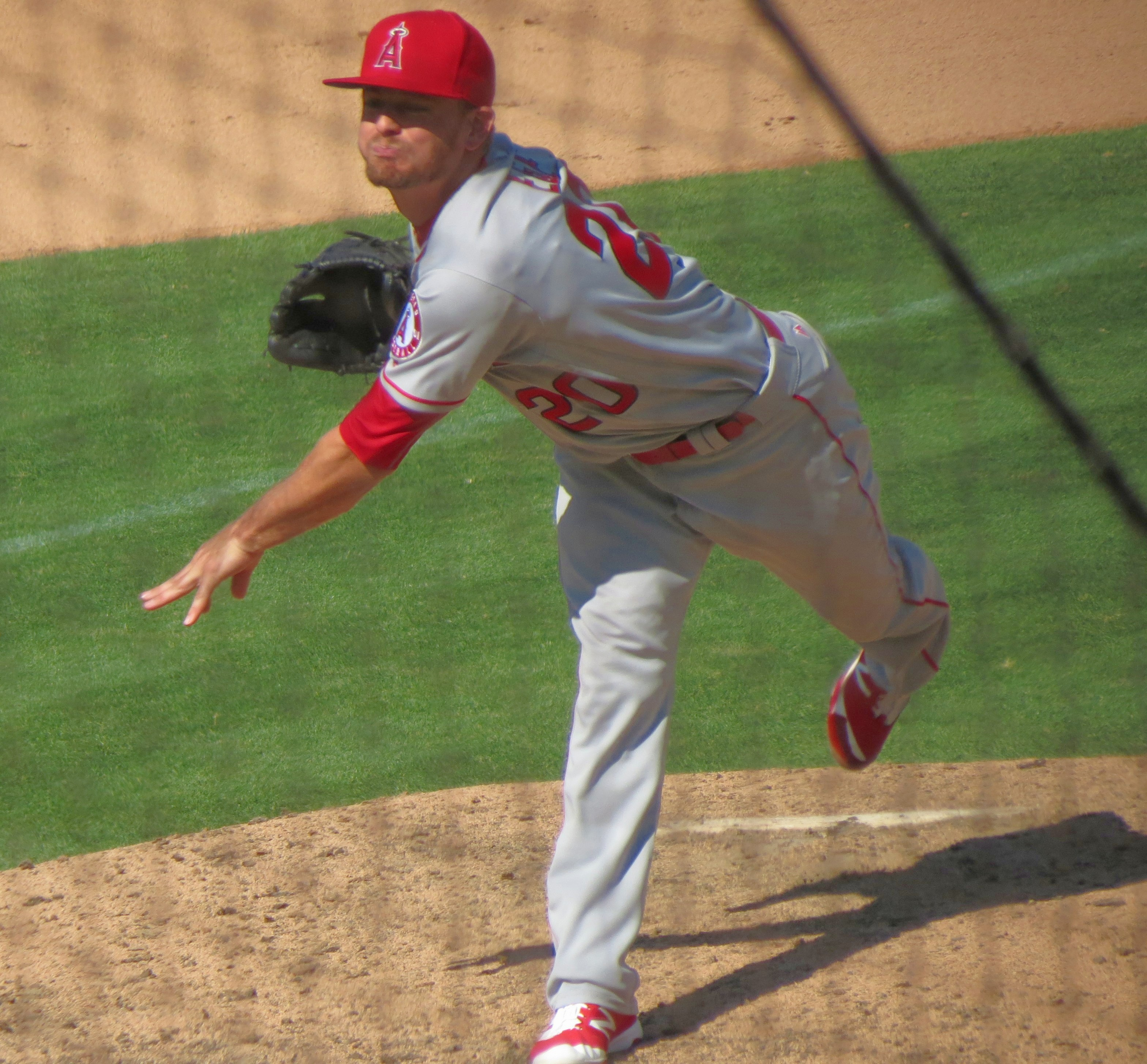
- Ege pitching for the Los Angeles Angels in 2016
- Pitcher
- Born: May 8, 1991 (age 35); Cherokee, Iowa, U.S.
- Batted: Left Threw: Left

MLB debut
- April 23, 2016, for the Miami Marlins

Last MLB appearance
- September 30, 2016, for the Los Angeles Angels

MLB statistics
- Win–loss record: 1–0
- Earned run average: 3.86
- Strikeouts: 11
- Stats at Baseball Reference

Teams
- Miami Marlins (2016); Los Angeles Angels (2016)

Cody Paul Ege (born May 8, 1991) is an American former professional baseball pitcher. He played in Major League Baseball (MLB) for the Miami Marlins and Los Angeles Angels.

== Early life ==
Ege played high school baseball and basketball at Washington High School in Cherokee, Iowa during a period when Washington qualified for the state tournament every year since 2005. He first joined the varsity baseball team as an eighth-grader for the 2006 season. Teammate Matt Koch was a year older than Ege, and the two would continue to play together at the University of Louisville and ultimately both made the Major Leagues in 2016.

In 2007, Cherokee won the state championship in with a 31–2 record. The team lost in the state championship game in 2008. Ege pitched the state championship semifinal game against Dyersville Beckman, entering with a 9–0 record and 0.13 ERA. Ege recorded 13 strikeouts, but took the loss, 1–0.

During his senior year, Ege had a 6–2 record, pitched 59 innings, with a 0.83 ERA and 123 strikeouts, while hitting .461 with 9 HR and 34 RBIs. The team was defeated in the state quarterfinals by Kuemper Catholic High School, 3–0. Ege was selected as honorary captain for Class 2-A on the 2010 Iowa Newspaper Association All-State Baseball Team. Ege was a four-time Lakes Conference and All-District performer.

Ege played college baseball at the University of Louisville.

== Career ==
=== Texas Rangers ===
He was drafted by the Texas Rangers in the 15th round of the 2013 Major League Baseball draft. He made his professional debut that year with the Spokane Indians and also spent time with the Hickory Crawdads and Myrtle Beach Pelicans. Ege spent 2014 with Myrtle Beach and started 2015 with the High Desert Mavericks before being promoted to the Double-A Frisco RoughRiders.

=== Miami Marlins ===
On July 31, 2015, Ege and Tomás Telis were traded to the Miami Marlins in exchange for Sam Dyson. The Marlins assigned him to the Double–A Jacksonville Suns before promoting him to the Triple–A New Orleans Zephyrs.

Ege made his major league debut on April 23, 2016. In 5 games for Miami during his rookie campaign, he struggled to a 12.00 ERA with 2 strikeouts over 3 innings pitched. Ege was designated for assignment by the Marlins on September 9.

=== Los Angeles Angels ===
On August 12, 2016, Ege was claimed off waivers by the Los Angeles Angels. In 13 appearances for the Angels, he compiled a 1-0 record and 1.04 ERA with 9 strikeouts across 8 2/3 innings pitched. On December 2, Ege was non-tendered by the Angels and became a free agent.

On January 7, 2017, Ege re–signed with the Angels on a minor league contract. He spent the year with the Triple–A Salt Lake Bees, making 26 appearances and logging a 5.49 ERA with 40 strikeouts in 39 1/3 innings pitched. Ege elected free agency following the season on November 6.
