= José Valdez (baseball, born 1990) =

Dominican baseball player

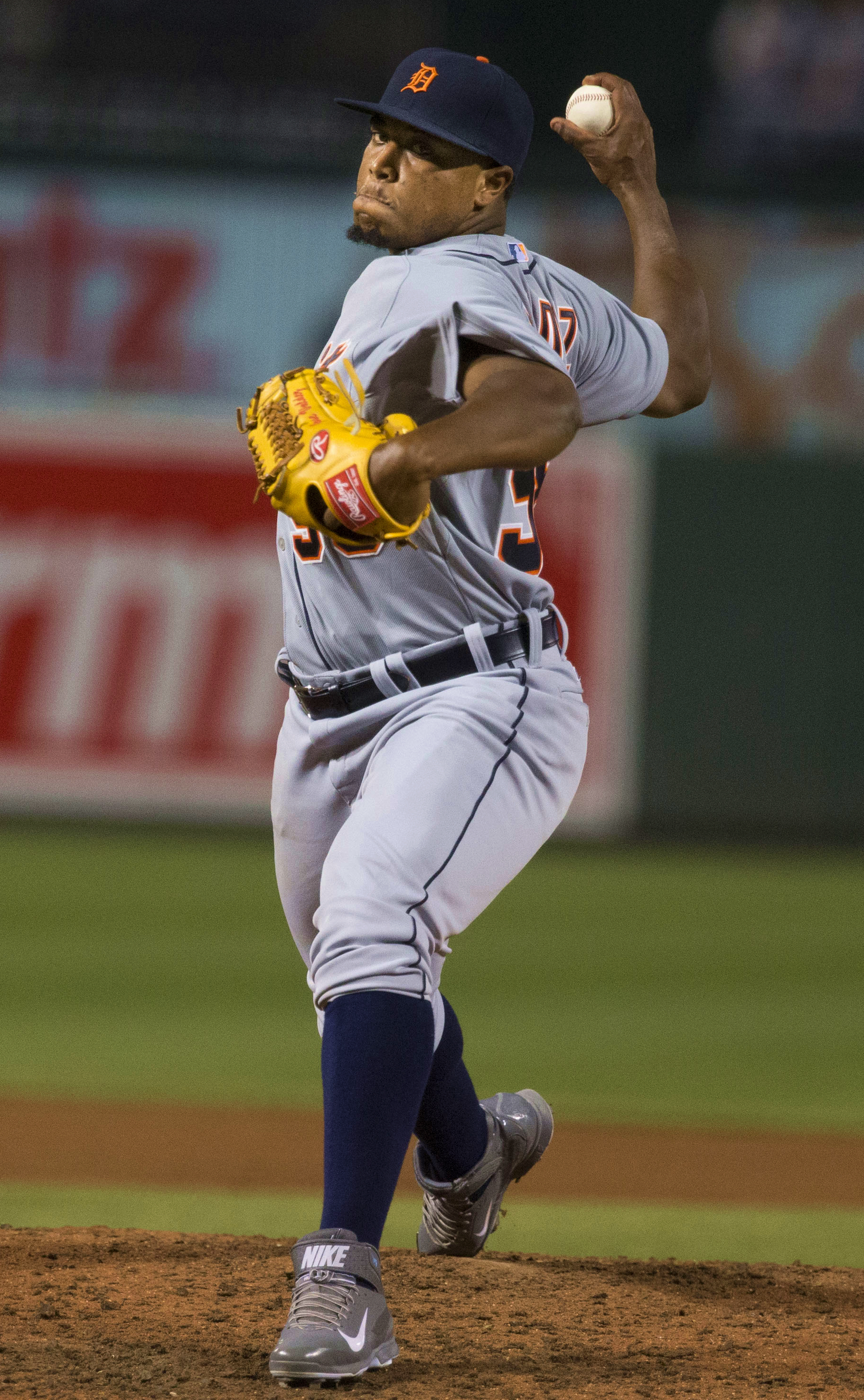
- Valdez with the Detroit Tigers
- Pitcher
- Born: March 1, 1990 (age 36); Don Gregorio Nizao, Dominican Republic
- Batted: Right Threw: Right

Professional debut
- MLB: July 31, 2015, for the Detroit Tigers
- CPBL: November 4, 2021, for the CTBC Brothers

Last appearance
- MLB: May 18, 2018, for the San Francisco Giants
- CPBL: July 22, 2022, for the Fubon Guardians

MLB statistics
- Win–loss record: 2–4
- Earned run average: 6.34
- Strikeouts: 47

CPBL statistics
- Win–loss record: 3–6
- Earned run average: 3.71
- Strikeouts: 35
- Stats at Baseball Reference

Teams
- Detroit Tigers (2015); Los Angeles Angels (2016–2017); San Diego Padres (2017); San Francisco Giants (2018); CTBC Brothers (2021); Fubon Guardians (2022)

Career highlights and awards
- CPBL: Taiwan Series champion (2021)

José Alfredo Valdez (born March 1, 1990) is a Dominican former professional baseball pitcher. He has previously played in Major League Baseball (MLB) for the Detroit Tigers, Los Angeles Angels, San Diego Padres and San Francisco Giants. He has also played in the Chinese Professional Baseball League (CPBL) for the CTBC Brothers and Fubon Guardians.

== Career ==
=== Detroit Tigers ===
Valdez played for the Dominican Summer League Tigers from 2009 to 2011. He played for the Gulf Coast Tigers in 2012. He played the 2013 season with the West Michigan Whitecaps and the Lakeland Flying Tigers and was the closer for both teams. He finished the season with 33 saves and a 2.74 earned run average. He was added to the Tigers 40-man roster on November 20, 2013.

Valdez was recalled by the Tigers on July 31, 2015, and made his major league debut later that night in a game against the Baltimore Orioles. In his debut, Valdez faced four batters, allowing three hits, two earned runs, and one walk, without recording an out in the inning, and taking the loss. Prior to being recalled, Valdez was 2–0 with one save, and a 2.03 ERA over his last 10 games with the Toledo Mud Hens. He was optioned back to Toledo on August 4 after his lone start to make room on the roster for Matt Boyd, who started the next day.

Valdez had a 4–4 record and a 3.44 ERA in 38 appearances with Toledo, having allowed 44 hits over 52 1/3 innings, with 33 walks and 40 strikeouts. Valdez was called up to the Tigers again on August 20, 2015, when starters Daniel Norris and Aníbal Sánchez were placed on the disabled list. He made a total of seven appearances (9 innings) with the big-league club in 2015.

=== Los Angeles Angels ===
On June 7, 2016, the Tigers traded Valdez to the Los Angeles Angels in exchange for cash considerations.

=== San Diego Padres ===
Valdez was claimed off waivers by the San Diego Padres on May 10, 2017. In 13 games for the Padres, he struggled to a 7.94 ERA with 16 strikeouts across 17 innings pitched. On September 18, 2017, Valdez was designated for assignment by the Padres. He cleared waivers and was sent outright to the Triple-A El Paso Chihuahuas on September 21. Valdez elected free agency on October 16.

=== San Francisco Giants ===
Valdez signed a minor league contract with the San Francisco Giants on January 4, 2018. In 37 appearances out of the bullpen, he compiled a 3–4 record and 4.93 ERA with 58 strikeouts across 49 1/3 innings pitched. Valdez elected free agency following the season on November 2.

=== Diablos Rojos del México ===
On March 21, 2019, Valdez signed with the Diablos Rojos del México of the Mexican League. In 4 games for Mexico, he struggled to a 27.00 ERA with 5 strikeouts across 2 2/3 innings of relief. Valdez was released by the team on May 1.

=== Rieleros de Aguascalientes ===
On May 10, 2019, Valdez signed with the Rieleros de Aguascalientes of the Mexican League. In 22 games (16 starts) for Aguascalientes, he went 6–3 with a 4.83 ERA and 82 strikeouts across 100 2/3 innings of work. Valdez was released by the Rieleros on December 31.

=== Pericos de Puebla ===
On May 20, 2021, Valdez signed with the Pericos de Puebla of the Mexican League. In 13 starts for Puebla, he went 6–1 with a 5.00 ERA and 69 strikeouts across 72 innings.

=== CTBC Brothers ===
On September 29, 2021, Valdez signed with the CTBC Brothers of the Chinese Professional Baseball League. Valdez started the Taiwan Series–clinching game against the Uni-President Lions, throwing 8 scoreless innings with 5 strikeouts and earning the MVP of the Game award. He was not re-signed for the 2022 season, and became a free agent.

=== Fubon Guardians ===
On February 7, 2022, Valdez signed with the Fubon Guardians of the Chinese Professional Baseball League for the 2022 season. He pitched to a 4.17 ERA and 1.43 WHIP over 49.2 innings. Valdez was released on July 28.

=== El Águila de Veracruz ===
On May 19, 2023, Valdez signed with El Águila de Veracruz of the Mexican League. In 8 games, he registered a 2–2 record with a 6.11 ERA and 28 strikeouts over 35 1/3 innings. Valdez was waived on July 3.

=== Generales de Durango ===
On July 12, 2023, Valdez signed with the Generales de Durango of the Mexican League. In 10 games (9 starts) for Durango, he struggled to a 1–8 record and 7.40 ERA with 30 strikeouts across 45 innings. Valdez was released by the Generales on June 6.
