= Sam Dyson =

American baseball player (born 1988)

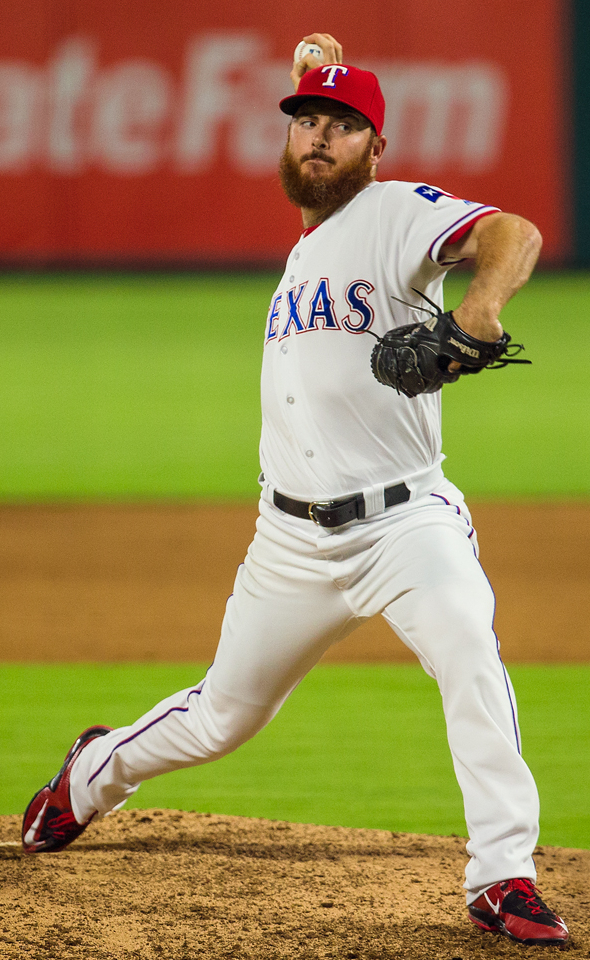
- Dyson with the Texas Rangers in 2016
- Pitcher
- Born: May 7, 1988 (age 38); Tampa, Florida, U.S.
- Batted: Right Threw: Right

MLB debut
- July 5, 2012, for the Toronto Blue Jays

Last appearance
- September 3, 2019, for the Minnesota Twins

MLB statistics
- Win–loss record: 24–23
- Earned run average: 3.40
- Strikeouts: 310
- Saves: 59
- Stats at Baseball Reference

Teams
- Toronto Blue Jays (2012); Miami Marlins (2013–2015); Texas Rangers (2015–2017); San Francisco Giants (2017–2019); Minnesota Twins (2019)
Medals
Men's baseball
Representing United States
World Baseball Classic
Gold medal – first place	2017 Los Angeles	Team

Samuel Isaac Dyson (born May 7, 1988) is an American former professional baseball pitcher. He played in Major League Baseball (MLB) for the Toronto Blue Jays, Miami Marlins, Texas Rangers, San Francisco Giants, and Minnesota Twins. He played college baseball at South Carolina. Dyson is one of the few people to have won both a College World Series and a World Baseball Classic.

== Early life ==
Dyson was born on May 7, 1988, in Tampa, Florida, to Sid and Gwenn Dyson. He attended Tampa Jesuit High School, pitching all four years on the school's baseball team and finishing with a 10–1 record in his senior year. He was selected by the Washington Nationals in the 19th round of the 2006 MLB draft, but elected to attend college instead.

== College career ==
At the University of South Carolina, he was sidelined with an injury in his freshman year and received a medical redshirt. He posted an 8–0 record with a 4.09 ERA in 2008. At the end of his sophomore year, he was selected in the 10th round of the 2009 Major League Baseball draft, but decided to continue in college.

== Professional career ==
=== Draft and minor leagues ===
Following his senior year, in which he posted a 6–5 record with a 4.25 ERA, he was drafted by the Toronto Blue Jays in the fourth round of the 2010 MLB draft. Dyson did not pitch professionally in 2010 after undergoing labrum repair surgery, and he missed the entire 2011 season recovering from Tommy John surgery on his right elbow. In 2+ seasons in the minor leagues, Dyson posted a 2–0 record with 3 saves, a 2.56 ERA, 13 walks, and 24 strikeouts over 52.2 innings.

=== Toronto Blue Jays (2012) ===
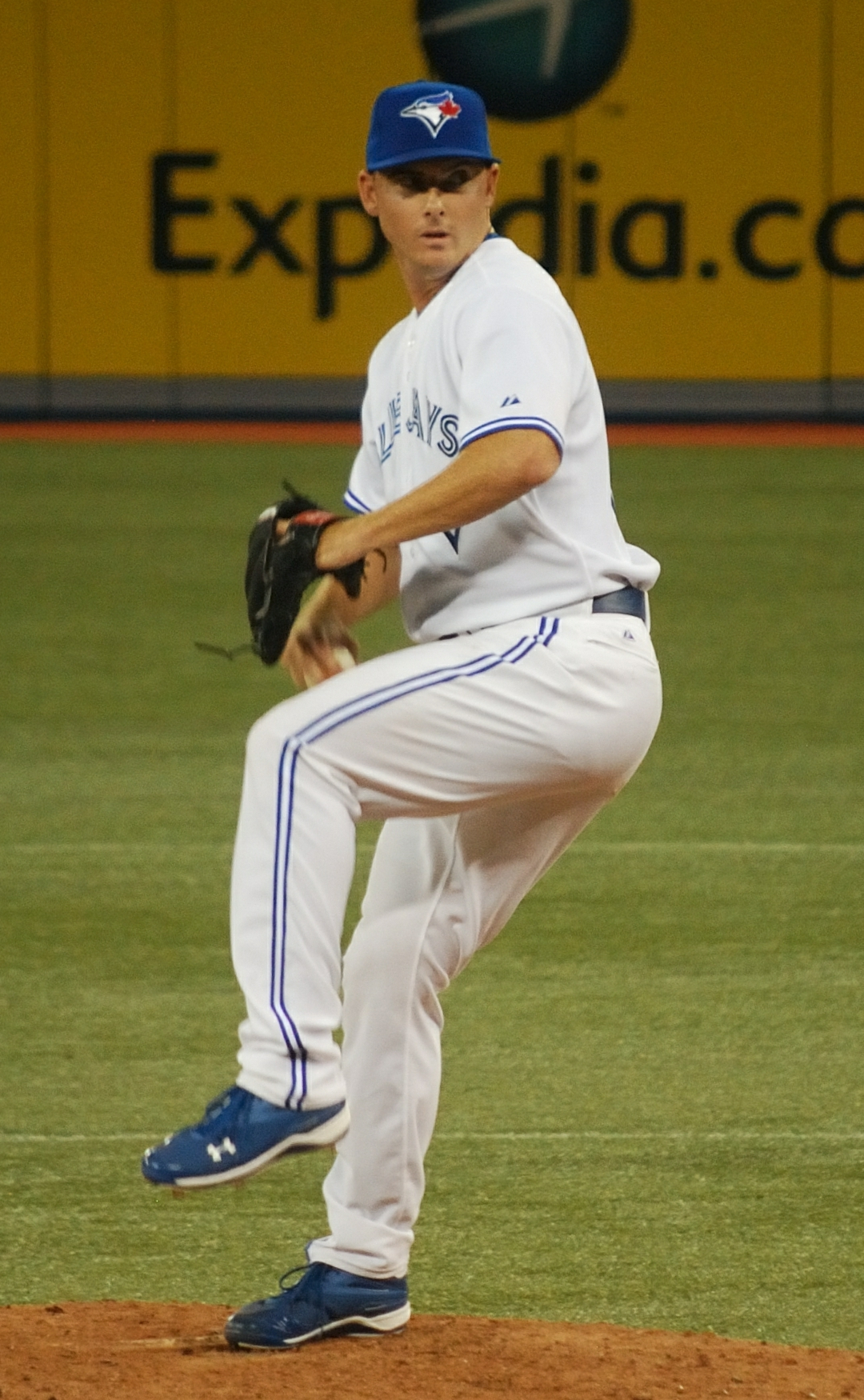
Dyson pitching for the Toronto Blue Jays in 2012

Dyson was called up to MLB on July 5, 2012. He was the first Blue Jays player from the 2010 draft to reach MLB. He made his MLB debut later that day to get the final out in the 7th inning. After walking Billy Butler, Dyson struck out Yuniesky Betancourt. On July 19, Yan Gomes was called up to the Jays, and Dyson was sent back to Double-A New Hampshire after making 2 appearances over 2 weeks. In 2/3 of an inning, Dyson allowed 3 earned runs and struck out 1. He was designated for assignment on January 22, 2013, to make room on the 40-man roster for Mark DeRosa.

=== Miami Marlins (2013–2015) ===
On January 30, 2013, Dyson was claimed off waivers by the Miami Marlins. Dyson was assigned to Double-A Jacksonville to begin 2013. On July 7, Dyson was placed on the disabled list with a lower back strain after a start against Chattanooga. Dyson was elected to participate in the Southern League All-Star Game, but didn't play because of the injury. In 16 games (15 starts) before the break, he went 3–7 with a 2.63 ERA, striking out 41 in 75.1 innings. After making one rehab assignment with the GCL Marlins, he was assigned to Triple-A New Orleans, where he made 5 more starts. In the minors in 2013, Dyson went 4–11 with a 2.67 ERA, striking out 62 in 111.1 innings. On August 29, Dyson was recalled by the Marlins, replacing Arquimedes Caminero. He made his Marlins debut that day, pitching 2 innings, while giving up 5 hits and 3 earned runs. After making 2 more relief appearances, Dyson made his first major league start on September 16 against the Phillies, lasting only 2.2 innings, giving up 7 runs on 6 hits and 4 walks, striking out 1. In 5 games (1 start) for the Marlins in 2013, Dyson went 0–2, giving up 11 runs in 11 innings while striking out 5 and walking 5.

=== Texas Rangers (2015–2017) ===
On July 31, 2015, the Marlins traded Dyson to the Texas Rangers for Tomás Telis and Cody Ege. Dyson would finish his 2015 season with a 3.69 ERA. On October 8, 2015, Dyson made his postseason debut in Game 1 of the ALDS against his former team, the Blue Jays, earning the save. On October 14, Dyson gave up the go-ahead three run homer to José Bautista in the bottom of the 7th inning of the deciding Game 5, which the Rangers lost, 6–3, thus losing the series in 5 games. In that inning he also got into a couple of altercations with Edwin Encarnación and Troy Tulowitzki, which caused both benches to clear. The altercations were a direct reaction to Bautista's go-ahead home run and events that took place in the top of that inning.

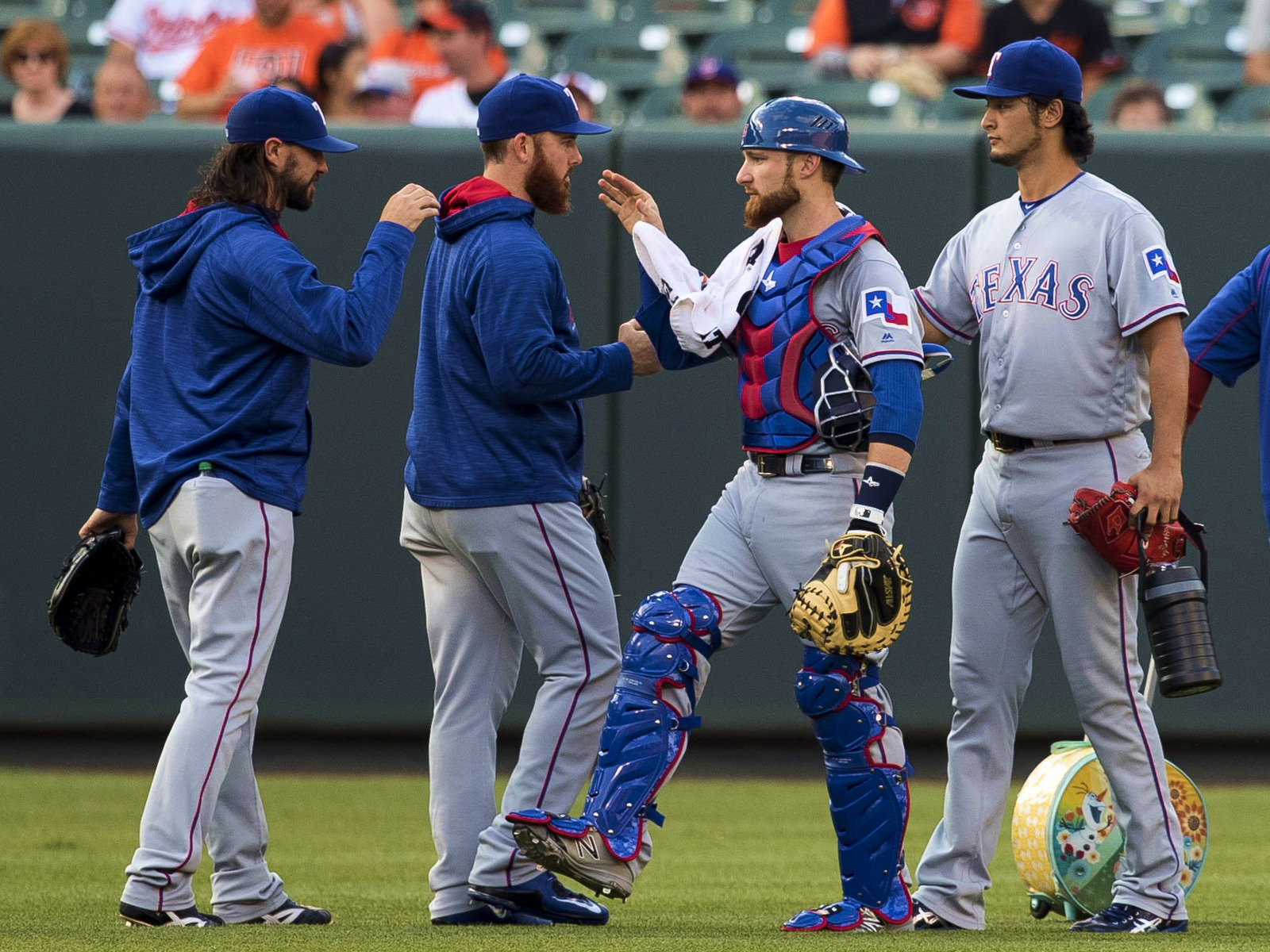
Dyson (second from left) with Tony Barnette (far left), Jonathan Lucroy and Yu Darvish (far right) in 2016

Dyson would take over as the Rangers' full-time closer halfway through the 2016 season, after a lackluster performance from Shawn Tolleson. Dyson was pivotal for Texas, as he finished with 38 saves in 43 opportunities and a 2.43 ERA, 55 strikeouts and a 1.22 WHIP.

After starting the 2017 season with a 10.80 ERA over 17 appearances, Dyson was designated for assignment on June 2.

=== San Francisco Giants (2017–2019) ===
On June 6, 2017, the San Francisco Giants announced they had acquired Dyson from the Texas Rangers for a player to be named later. With Mark Melancon heading to the disabled list, Dyson became the new closer.

=== Minnesota Twins (2019) ===
On July 31, 2019, the Giants traded Dyson to the Minnesota Twins in exchange for Jaylin Davis, Prelander Berroa, and Kai-Wei Teng. Dyson underwent surgery to repair a torn capsule in his right shoulder at the end of the 2019 season. Dyson elected free agency following the 2019 season.

On March 5, 2021, Dyson, a free agent at the time, was suspended for the entirety of the 2021 season after violating the off-the-field personal conduct policy, regarding a domestic violence case stemming back in 2019.

=== Toros de Tijuana ===
On April 18, 2022, Dyson signed with the Toros de Tijuana of the Mexican League. In 41 games out of the bullpen, Dyson compiled a 2.66 ERA with 45 strikeouts across 40 2/3 innings pitched.

== International career ==
Dyson pitched for the United States team in the 2017 World Baseball Classic. He helped the U.S. win the tournament by pitching six perfect innings.

== Controversies ==
While playing for the Pacific Coast League's New Orleans Zephyrs, Dyson was involved in a fight with Zephyrs' teammate Chris Hatcher at a Nashville bar on April 29, 2014. Hatcher broke Dyson's jaw in the fight, resulting in surgery which put Dyson on the injured list for six weeks and a 5-game suspension for Hatcher for conduct detrimental to the team.

After giving up the series-clinching home run to Toronto Blue Jays' right fielder José Bautista in game 5 of the 2015 American League Division Series, Dyson confronted Edwin Encarnación of the Blue Jays and informed him that he did not approve of Bautista's subsequent bat flip. Dyson also became involved in a confrontation with Blue Jays' shortstop Troy Tulowitzki over his displeasure. The exchanges led to both dugouts emptying and a long delay in completing the game. In explaining his actions afterwards, Dyson told reporters, "(Bautista)'s a huge role model for the younger generation that's coming up and playing this game. He's doing stuff that kids do in whiffle ball games and backyard baseball."

== Domestic violence lawsuit ==
On November 26, 2019, Dyson was accused of domestic violence by an ex-girlfriend, prompting an investigation by Major League Baseball. The alleged victim, Alexis Blackburn, said in two lengthy Instagram posts that Dyson had bullied her and was violent towards both her and her cat during the time they were a couple. On March 5, 2021, MLB suspended Dyson the entire 2021 season as a violation of the league's personal conduct policy.

On December 29, 2021, Blackburn accused Dyson of rape, battery, and infliction of emotional distress. In the complaint, Blackburn alleged that Dyson pointed a loaded gun at her in February 2017 and raped her two years later. The filing also accused Dyson of emotional distress towards Blackburn and stated that he frequently used racial slurs when referring to other MLB players, calling Black players "niggers" and Latino players "poor Mexicans".
