= Matt Shoemaker =

American baseball player (born 1986)

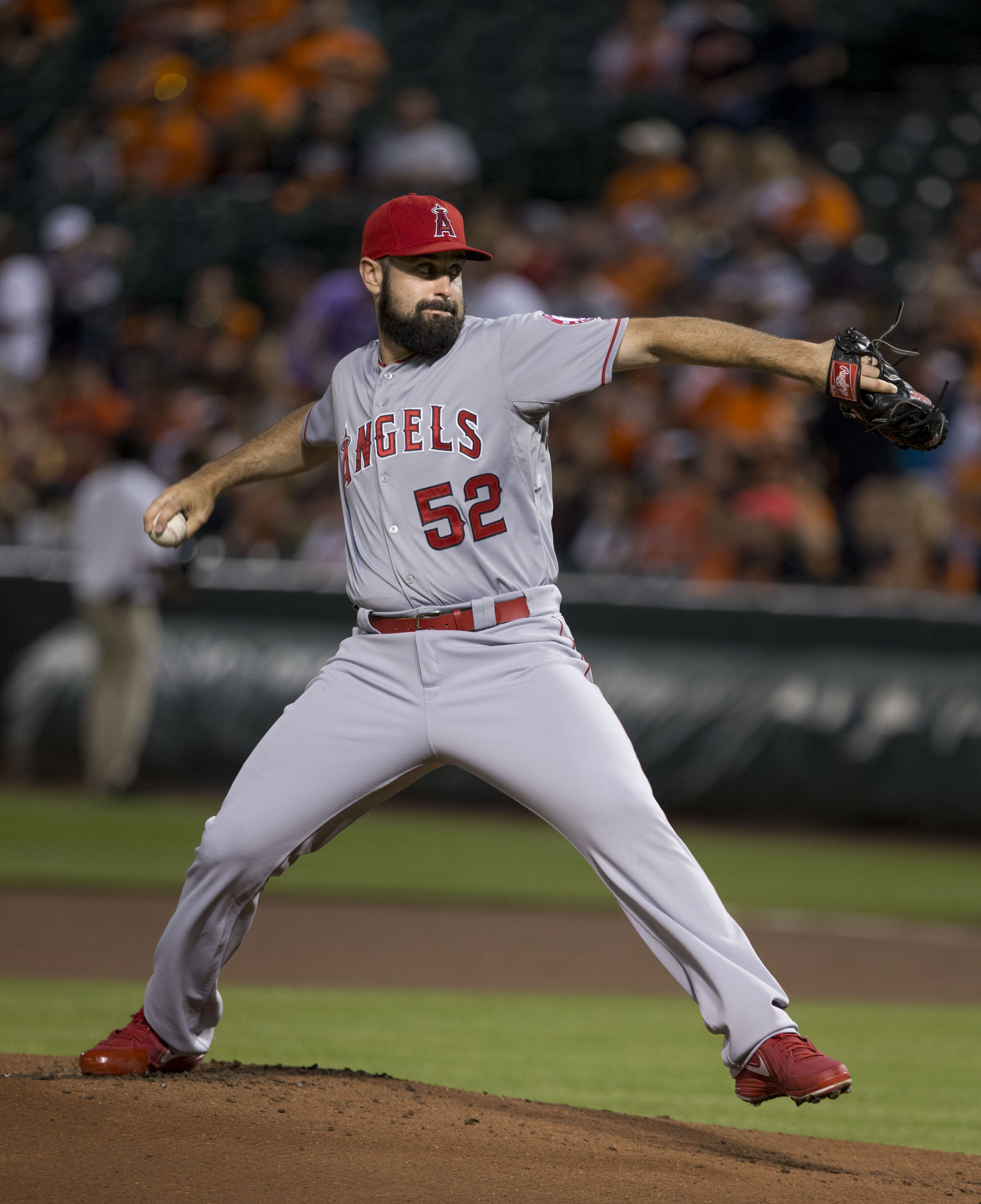
- Shoemaker with the Los Angeles Angels
- Pitcher
- Born: September 27, 1986 (age 39); Wyandotte, Michigan, U.S.
- Batted: Right Threw: Right

Professional debut
- MLB: September 20, 2013, for the Los Angeles Angels
- NPB: April 9, 2022, for the Yomiuri Giants

Last appearance
- MLB: June 30, 2021, for the Minnesota Twins
- NPB: September 29, 2022, for the Yomiuri Giants

MLB statistics
- Win–loss record: 46–41
- Earned run average: 4.24
- Strikeouts: 580

NPB statistics
- Win–loss record: 4–8
- Earned run average: 4.25
- Strikeouts: 65
- Stats at Baseball Reference

Teams
- Los Angeles Angels of Anaheim / Los Angeles Angels (2013–2018); Toronto Blue Jays (2019–2020); Minnesota Twins (2021); Yomiuri Giants (2022)
Medals
Men's baseball
Representing United States
Pan American Games
Silver medal – second place	2011 Guadalajara	National team

Matthew David Shoemaker (born September 27, 1986) is an American former professional baseball pitcher. He played in Major League Baseball (MLB) for the Los Angeles Angels, Toronto Blue Jays, and Minnesota Twins and in Nippon Professional Baseball (NPB) for the Yomiuri Giants. Prior to beginning his professional career, he played college baseball at Eastern Michigan University (EMU). Shoemaker has also competed for the United States national baseball team.

After completing his degree at EMU, Shoemaker went unselected in the 2008 MLB draft. He signed with the Angels as a free agent, and pitched in Minor League Baseball through 2013, when he made his MLB debut. Shoemaker was named the American League (AL) Rookie of the Month and Pitcher of the Month in August 2014, and he finished second in AL Rookie of the Year Award voting after the season.

== Amateur career ==
Shoemaker attended Trenton High School in Trenton, Michigan, graduating in 2004. He then enrolled at Eastern Michigan University (EMU), where he played college baseball for the Eastern Michigan Eagles baseball team in the Mid-American Conference (MAC) of the National Collegiate Athletic Association's (NCAA) Division I. In 2007, as a sophomore, he saved 14 games for EMU, and was named to the All-MAC's second team. He tied for fifth in NCAA Division I in saves, setting the EMU single-season record in the process. He moved back to the rotation in 2008, his junior season. As a junior, Shoemaker pitched to a 6-7 win–loss record with a 4.83 earned run average in 15 games pitched. He graduated from EMU after his junior year, forgoing his final year of college eligibility.

Shoemaker played for the United States national baseball team in the 2011 Baseball World Cup and 2011 Pan American Games, winning the silver medal.

== Professional career ==
=== Los Angeles Angels of Anaheim / Los Angeles Angels ===
==== Minor leagues ====
In the 2008 MLB draft, Shoemaker went unselected. He played collegiate summer baseball in the Great Lakes Summer Collegiate League, where he was scouted and signed as a free agent by the Los Angeles Angels of Anaheim. He received a $10,000 signing bonus. Shoemaker began the 2009 season with the Cedar Rapids Kernels of the Single–A Midwest League as a relief pitcher. After pitching to a 1-0 record and a 6.57 ERA in his first seven games, they demoted him to extended spring training in May. He returned to Cedar Rapids in June. Shoemaker pitched for the Rancho Cucamonga Quakes of the High–A California League in 2010.

Shoemaker began the 2011 season with the Salt Lake Bees of the Triple–A Pacific Coast League, and was demoted to the Arkansas Travelers of the Double–A Texas League in May. He appeared in the Texas League All-Star Game in June. He was named the Texas League Pitcher of the Year and the Angels' Minor League Pitcher of the Year, after leading the league with 12 wins, a 2.21 ERA, and 1.03 walks plus hits per inning pitched.

The Angels invited Shoemaker to spring training with the Angels in 2012, receiving an opportunity to compete for the open fifth starter role for the Angels. He pitched for Salt Lake during the 2012 and 2013 seasons.

==== Major leagues ====
On September 15, 2013, the Angels promoted Shoemaker to the major leagues. He made his MLB debut on September 20, allowing no runs and striking out five batters to record a win.

Shoemaker made the Angels' 2014 Opening Day roster as a relief pitcher. He earned a spot in the Angels' starting rotation during the season. Shoemaker won the American League (AL) Rookie of the Month and Pitcher of the Month Awards. On September 10, 2014, Shoemaker earned his 15th win – a new Angels' rookie record. He suffered a strained rib cage the next week, and recovered in time for the MLB postseason. Shoemaker finished the season with a 16-4 record with 124 strikeouts in 136 innings pitched. He took second place, behind José Abreu, in AL Rookie of the Year Award voting. After the season, Shoemaker appeared in the 2014 Major League Baseball Japan All-Star Series, getting the win in a game against the Japanese All-Star team.

After his solid 2014 season, Shoemaker opened 2015 as the Angels #3 starter. He experienced inconsistency throughout the 2015 campaign, leading to his demotion to Triple-A Salt Lake on August 16. He was called up when rosters expanded in September. Shoemaker finished 7-10 with a 4.46 ERA in 24 starts. Shoemaker began the 2016 season in the Angels rotation but after posting an ERA of 9.15 in 5 starts, the Angels sent him down to AAA. He was called up a week later after an injury to Garrett Richards.

On September 4, 2016, against the Seattle Mariners, Shoemaker was struck in the head by a 105 mph line drive and left the game. The impact left Shoemaker with a small skull fracture and small hematoma. The injury eventually ended his 2016 season. The same night, he underwent surgery on his skull to stop the bleeding.

Shoemaker's 2017 season was cut short due to injury for the second straight season. He pitched in 14 starts with a 6-3 record. Shoemaker, with continued better health, began the 2018 season in the rotation but was soon placed on the disabled list with a forearm injury, the same injury that sidelined him the previous season. He began a throwing program at the end of April. He was placed on the 60 day disabled list after undergoing forearm surgery on May 13. He made his return to the rotation at the end of the season, finishing the 2018 season with a 2-2 record in 7 starts.

On November 30, 2018, the Angels non-tendered Shoemaker, making him a free agent.

=== Toronto Blue Jays ===
On December 28, 2018, Shoemaker signed a one-year, $3.5 million contract with the Toronto Blue Jays.

On March 29, 2019, he made his Blue Jays debut, throwing seven scoreless innings and earning the win against the Detroit Tigers. On April 20, Shoemaker left a game against the Oakland Athletics in the fourth inning after injuring his left knee in a rundown play. An MRI revealed he had torn his anterior cruciate ligament (ACL) and would miss the rest of the season. Before the injury, he had a 3–0 record with a 1.57 ERA through five starts.

With the 2020 Toronto Blue Jays, Shoemaker appeared in 6 games, compiling a 0-1 record with 4.71 ERA and 26 strikeouts in 28.2 innings pitched.

=== Minnesota Twins ===
On February 15, 2021, Shoemaker signed a one-year, $2 million contract with the Minnesota Twins. Shoemaker won his first start of the season and authored a mediocre start following it. He lost his next two starts before recording, in his words, "the worst start of [his] career", giving up 9 runs (8 earned) in 3 1/3 innings to the Kansas City Royals. After briefly recovering and picking up his second win, he lost his next 3 decisions, the last another poor start against the Royals that propelled his ERA to 5.90. On June 4, he recorded the worst start of his career, surrendering 9 runs to the Royals again (8 of them earned) while recording just one out before being removed from the game; the appearance ballooned his season ERA from 5.90 to 7.38. Relegated to the bullpen a week later, he continued to struggle in a relief role before briefly rebounding on the June 21 and 24. After authoring another brutal appearance on June 30 - surrendering 8 earned runs in a relief appearance of just 2 2/3 innings - he was designated for assignment by the Twins the next day with a season ERA of 8.06. On July 5, Shoemaker cleared waivers and accepted an assignment to the Triple-A St. Paul Saints. On August 3, Shoemaker was released by the Twins.

=== San Francisco Giants ===
On August 7, 2021, Shoemaker signed a minor league contract with the San Francisco Giants. In nine appearances (eight starts) for the Triple-A Sacramento River Cats, he posted a 4-3 record and 4.83 ERA with 54 strikeouts across 50 1/3 innings pitched. Shoemaker elected free agency following the season on November 7.

=== Yomiuri Giants ===
On February 28, 2022, Shoemaker signed with the Yomiuri Giants of Nippon Professional Baseball. In 18 appearances for Yomiuri, he compiled a 4-8 record and 4.25 ERA with 65 strikeouts across 95 1/3 innings pitched. Shoemaker became a free agent following the season.

== Personal life ==
Shoemaker and his wife, Danielle, have been married since 2009 and have two sons and two daughters together.

Shoemaker has a full beard. The Arkansas Travelers commemorated Shoemaker's beard with a T-shirt and with a removable goatee.
