= 2016 Houston Astros season =

55th season in Major League Baseball for the Houston Astros

2016 Houston Astros
- League: American League
- Division: West
- Ballpark: Minute Maid Park
- City: Houston, Texas
- Record: 84–78 (.519)
- Divisional place: 3rd
- Owners: Jim Crane
- General managers: Jeff Luhnow
- Managers: A. J. Hinch
- Television: Root Sports Southwest (Bill Brown, Alan Ashby, Geoff Blum)
- Radio: Sportstalk 790 (Robert Ford, Steve Sparks); KLAT (Spanish) (Francisco Romero, Alex Treviño)
- Stats: ESPN.com; Baseball Reference

The 2016 Houston Astros season was the 55th season for the Major League Baseball (MLB) franchise located in Houston, Texas, their 52nd as the Astros, fourth in both the American League (AL) and AL West division, and 17th at Minute Maid Park. They entered the season having posted an 86–76 record, in second place and 2 games behind the division-champion Texas Rangers. The Astros qualified for the playoffs as a Wild Card team; however, their season ended in defeat to the eventual World Series champion Kansas City Royals in the American League Division Series (ALDS).

On April 5 at Yankee Stadium, Dallas Keuchel made his second consecutive Opening Day start for Houston, who defeated New York, 5–3. After a 7–17 start in the month of April, the Astros produced a winning record over their next four months, highlighted by an 18–8 record in June. The Astros' first-round draft pick in the amateur draft was pitcher Forrest Whitley, at 17th overall.

Second baseman Jose Altuve and pitcher Will Harris represented the Astros and played for the American League at the MLB All-Star Game. It was Altuve's fourth career selection and the first for Harris. After going 12–15 in September, the Astros were eliminated from playoff contention.

The Astros concluded the season with a final record of 84–78, for third place and eleven games behind Texas, who repeated as division champions. In the Wild Card race, the Astros trailed the Toronto Blue Jays by five games for the second opening. For the first time since 2005—2006, the Astros posted consecutive winning seasons. The 2016 season was the final year in which Houston did not advance to at least the American League Championship Series (ALCS) until 2024, and the final time that they did not win the AL West over a full 162-game schedule until 2025. (Note: During the COVID-19 pandemic-shortened season of 2020, Houston finished second to the Oakland Athletics for the AL West championship.)

Altuve, who claimed a second AL batting championship (.338) and third consecutive hits title (216), was named The Sporting News Player of the Year, and the MLBPA Players Choice Awards each for Major League Player of the Year, AL Outstanding Player, and Majestic Athletic Always Game Award. He also won his third consecutive Silver Slugger Award. Additionally, pitcher Dallas Keuchel won his third consecutive Gold Glove, and third baseman Alex Bregman was selected to the Topps All-Star Rookie Team.

== Offseason ==
=== Summary ===
The Astros concluded the 2015 season with an 86–78 (.524) record, as runners-up in the AL West division, and two games behind the division-champion Texas Rangers. Houston qualified for the playoffs as a Wild Card entrant, and defeated the New York Yankees in the AL Wild Card Game, 3–0. The Astros advanced to the American League Division Series (ALDS), but were eliminated in five games by the eventual World Series-champion Kansas City Royals. It was the third consecutive playoff in which the Astros had qualified that they won the first round, previously in 2004 and 2005—also via Wild Card seeding. This was Houston's first regular-season winning campaign since shifting to the American League, first since 2008 (86–75 (.534)), and first playoff entrance since 2005, also the club's first time advancing to the World Series.

Southpaw Dallas Keuchel won the 2015 AL Cy Young Award to become the third Astro hurler to be recognized, joining Mike Scott (1986) and Roger Clemens (2004). Second baseman Jose Altuve led the league in hits (200) for the second successive campaign, becoming the first Astro to achieve this feat, and first to produce multiple campaigns with 200 hits or more. (Note: Previously, only Craig Biggio (210 in 1998) had accumulated as many as 200 hits in one season for Houston. Criteria: For single seasons, playing for HOU, in the regular season, requiring hits ≥ 200, sorted by ascending season.) Keuchel and Altuve won the Gold Glove Award, while Altuve won his second Silver Slugger Award. Shortstop Carlos Correa was recognized as AL Rookie of the Year, (Note: As voted by the Baseball Writers' Association of America (BBWAA).) the second Astro to win the award, joining first baseman Jeff Bagwell in 1991.

=== Transactions ===
==== Chronological ====
- 11/13/15 – Astros re-signed OF Colby Rasmus to the team's qualifying offer of one year, $15.8 million.
- 11/19/15 – Astros traded IF Jonathan Villar to the Milwaukee Brewers for RHP Cy Sneed.
- 11/25/15 – Astros traded IF Jed Lowrie to the Oakland Athletics for RHP Brendan McCurry.
- 12/2/15 – Astros traded C Hank Conger to the Tampa Bay Rays for cash considerations.
- 12/2/15 – Astros non-tendered 1B Chris Carter, making him a free agent.
- 12/11/15 – Astros re-signed LHP Tony Sipp to three year, $18 million deal.
- 12/12/15 – Astros traded RHP Vince Velasquez, RHP Mark Appel, LHP Brett Oberholtzer, RHP Harold Arauz, and RHP Thomas Eshelman to the Philadelphia Phillies for RHP Ken Giles and IF Jonathan Araúz.
- 1/28/16 – Astros signed free agent RHP Doug Fister to one year, $7 million deal.

==== Free agents ====
Major League free agents

International free agents
Yuli Gurriel (IF) (Cuba)	Departed Industriales Cuban National Series (CNS)	Signed with Houston Astros July 15, 2016 5 years, $47.5 million

Amateur free agents
April 27	RHP	Ronel Blanco	(Dominican Republic)

==== Trades ====
August 1, 2016	To Houston Astros Yordan Alvarez (OF)	To Los Angeles Dodgers Josh Fields (RHP)

=== Spring training ===
The 2016 season marked the final year the Astros played their spring training ball at Osceola County Stadium in Kissimmee, Florida, where Houston had played since 1985. In 2017, the Astros moved to The Ballpark of The Palm Beaches, a brand new stadium located in West Palm Beach, Florida, that Houston shares with the Washington Nationals.

Houston finished fifth in the Grapefruit League with an 18–11 record, four games back of the champion Nationals.

== Regular season ==
=== Summary ===
==== April ====
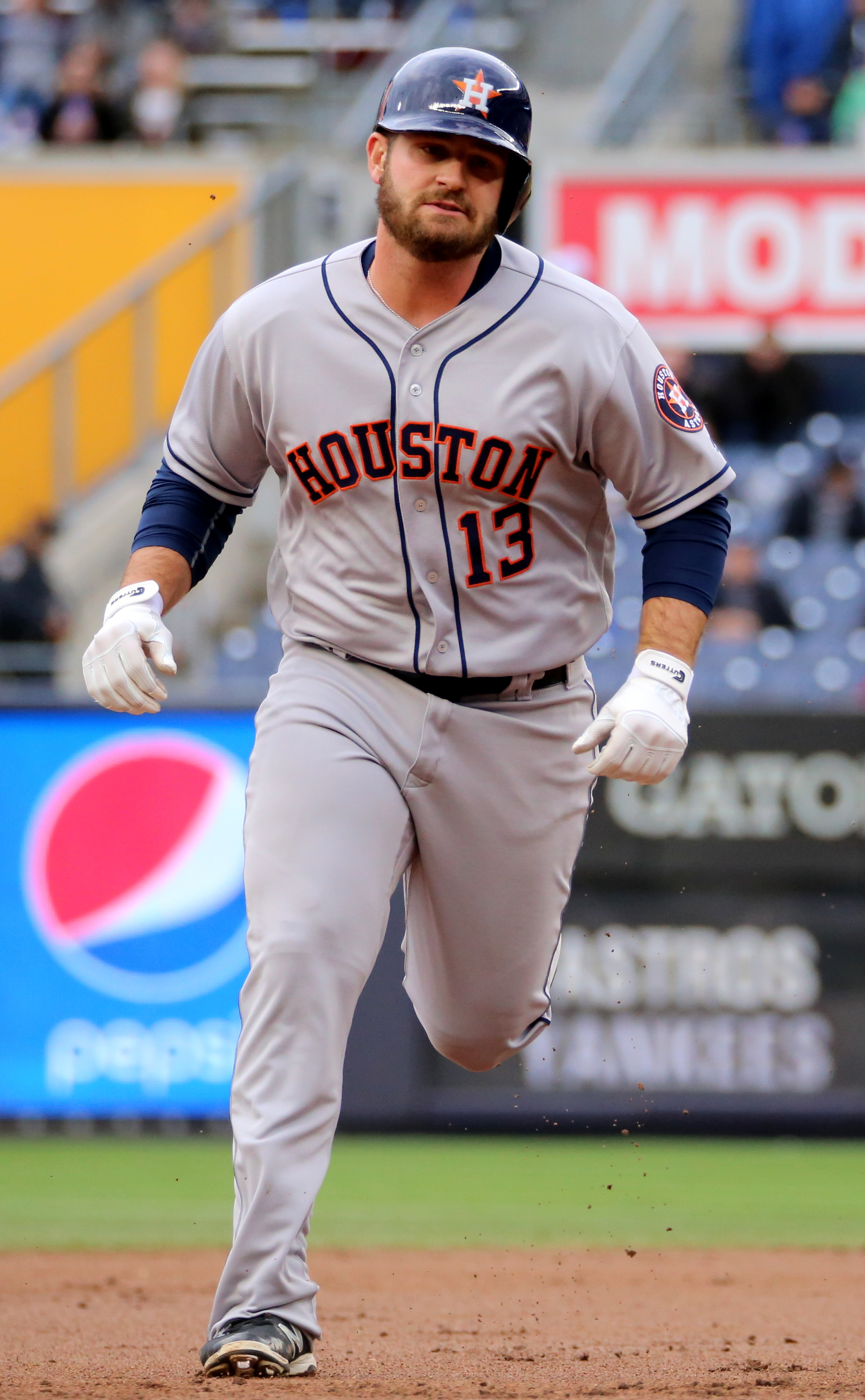
Tyler White made his MLB debut on Opening Day in 2016.

Opening Day starting lineup
Uniform	Player	Position
27	Jose Altuve	Second baseman
4	George Springer	Right fielder
1	Carlos Correa	Shortstop
28	Colby Rasmus	Left fielder
30	Carlos Gómez	Center fielder
18	Luis Valbuena	Third baseman
20	Preston Tucker	Designated hitter
9	Marwin González	First baseman
15	Jason Castro	Catcher
60	Dallas Keuchel	Pitcher
Venue: Yankee Stadium • Houston 5, New York (AL) 3 Sources:

In a recasting of the outgoing playoff's AL Wild Card Game, New York hosted the Astros at Yankee Stadium, with Dallas Keuchel opposing Masahiro Tanaka, for Opening Day, on April 5. Carlos Correa homered and collected two stolen bases, and Jose Altuve and Preston Tucker each doubled to lead Houston to victory, 5 to 3. Correa's home run was the first of his career on Opening Day. Tyler White entered as a pinch hitter to make his major league debut and collected a single. Keuchel, making his second consecutive Opening Day start for Houston, worked seven innings to earn the win. Ken Giles worked the eighth and garnered two whiffs, including withstanding a solo home run by Didi Gregorius, to earn the hold. Closer Luke Gregerson pitched a perfect bottom of the ninth with a strikeout to garner the save.

Tyler White batted .556 (10-for18), two doubles, three home runs, 9 runs batted in (RBI), .597 on-base percentage (OBP), and 1.167 slugging percentage (SLG) over his first six games. Hence, White was named Player of the Week to cap a memorable first week in the major leagues.

During Game 2 of the regular season, on April 6, George Springer slugged his first career grand slam, taking Michael Pineda deep to left-center field in top of the second at Yankee Stadium. Carlos Correa added two jacks. However, New York teed off on Collin McHugh (0–1) for six in the bottom of the first and never looked back, routing the Astros, 16–6.

Right-hander Chris Devenski made his major league debut on April 8 and pitched three innings scoreless frames in relief versus the Milwaukee Brewers. Devenski entered for the bottom of the fifth with Houston trailing 0-to-4 and fanned his first hitter, Domingo Santana, looking. Chris Carter doubled off Devesnki in the sixth for his first major league hit surrendered and only hit off Devenski in the contest. Tyler White led the Astros' hitters with three hits, one home run, one double and three RBI. The Astros staged a four-run rally in the top of the ninth inning, but the Brewers held on for a 6–4 triumph.

From April 10 to 16, Jose Altuve batted .385 / .484 on-base percentage (OBP) / .846 slugging percentage (SLG) / 1.330 on-base plus slugging (OPS) over seven games. Altuve doubled, homered, and purloined a base thrice, with 5 each of RBI, walks, and strikeouts, 22 total bases, and 10 hits. Altuve won AL Player of the Week, the second consecutive week that an Astro won, following Tyler White.

On April 24, Marwin González extended his major league record by hitting his first 25 home runs with no one on base, lapping second-place finisher Todd Dunwoody by more than double (11).

==== May ====
On May 6, with Evan Gattis aboard, Marwin González walloped the first home run of his career with a runner on base, his 26th, ending a major league record of the first 25 home runs with no runners on base.

Astros pitching established a major league strikeout record on May 26, whiffing 52 in a series against the Baltimore Orioles, for most over a three-game series. During the first game of the series, the pitchers fanned 19, the followed up with 18 the next game. The strikeouts over the first two established a two-game record with 37.

On May 30, right-hander Collin McHugh tossed his first career complete game, winning the decision while surrendering five hits and three runs over nine innings, and fanning eight. His previous career high in innings for one game occurred on April 27, 2014, going 8 2/3 innings pitched.

==== June ====
On June 1, George Springer connected for his first career walk-off home run, during the bottom of the eleventh inning versus Tyler Clippard of the Arizona Diamondbacks.

George Springer hit his third grand slam of the season on June 24 which established a team record. Eleven players in club history previously had hit two; the most recent Astro to do so was Chris Carter during the 2014 campaign.

On June 25, A. J. Reed made his major league debut and went 0-for-2 while collecting an RBI versus the Kansas City Royals. During this first plate appearance in the top of the second inning, Reed drew a base on balls from Royals starter Chris Young, scoring on a Luis Valbuena double, which ignited a seven-run frame for Houston. Later in the inning, Jose Altuve (13) and Carlos Correa (12) homered as the Astros cruised to a 13-to-5 win. Altuve also doubled twice (23) while tallying four hits. Reed obtained his first RBI during the top of the fourth by hitting a sacrifice fly to left field that plated Altuve.

Second baseman Jose Altuve was recognized as American League (AL) Player of the Month for the first time in his career in June. Over 26 bouts, Altuve hit .420 / .492 on-base percentage (OBP) / .620 slugging percentage (SLG) / 1.112 on-base plus slugging (OPS). Altuve assembled 42 hits, including 6 doubles, a triple, 6 home runs, and purloined 6 bases, while collecting 15 RBI, drew 13 walks, and struck out 10 times. It was also his third successive month scoring at least 19 runs. Altuve became the first Astro to win the Player of the Month Award since the team transferred to the American League, and first overall since Lance Berkman won the National League (NL) honors in May 2008.

==== July ====
On July 24, Jose Altuve drove in a career-high six RBI.

On July 25, Alex Bregman made his major league debut versus the Yankees. Bregman started at third base and went 0-for-4 in a 2–1 loss. In his first plate appearance, Bregman filed out versus Michael Pineda. In the top of third inning, Bregman started his first double play when he fielded an Aaron Hicks ground ball. George Springer hit a first-pitch leadoff home run (22) for Houston's only score. Pineda (5–9) earned the win for New York, while Dallas Keuchel (6–10) scattered six hits over 7 2/3 innings and was charged with the defeat.

On July 26, Marwin González homered from both sides of the plate, becoming the eighth Astro to do, the first since the team moved to the American League, and first since Lance Berkman on July 3, 2006. González hit the 300th such instance overall in major league history.

After an 0-for-17 start to his major league career, on July 31, Bregman singled for his first major league hit.

==== August ====
On August 2, right-hander Joe Musgrove made his major league debut, tossing 4 1/3 innings versus the Toronto Blue Jays, yielding one hit, one run, and fanning eight.

On August 6, Alex Bregman went 3-for-5 for his first multi-hit game. He also doubled for his first career extra-base hit and RBI. However, the Texas Rangers defeated the Astros, 3 to 2.

On August 12, Teoscar Hernández made his major league debut, going 2-fo-4 versus Toronto, including his first major league home run. Hernández started in center field, and, in his first plate appearance, drew a lead off walk from Francisco Liriano during the top of the third inning, Hernández scored on a single by Carlos Correa. During the top of the sixth, Hernández took Liriano deep to left for both his first major league hit and home run. Evan Gattis doubled twice (16) and collected four hits as Houston won, 5–3. Joe Musgrove, the starter for Houston, hurled seven innings and earned his first major league victory. In spite of yielding a home run to Edwin Encarnación (32) in the ninth, Will Harris recorded the final three outs for the save (12).

On August 16, Altuve singled to assemble his 1,000th hit, which established an Astros' team record for the fewest games to do so (786), part a three-hit effort versus the St. Louis Cardinals. Altuve also became the second-fastest among active players to do so, following Ichiro Suzuki (696 games). Altuve reached the milestone in 103 fewer games than César Cedeño, and faster than eight of the then-30 entrants into the 3,000 hit club.

The Baltimore Orioles attained a Major League first on August 19 at the expense of the Astros, swatting four home runs to open a game prior to recording an out. During the first inning, the Orioles scored five runs. The Astros staged a rally, however, as they answered with five during top of the second inning, scoring in seven of nine innings on the way to a 15 to 8 triumph. Jose Altuve and George Springer each doubled and homered. Altuve collected five RBI while Springer had four hits. Chris Devenski (2–4) worked four innings with one run surrendered to earn the victory. Altuve produced his second five-RBI in under one month after having attained his first 6-RBI bout on July 24.

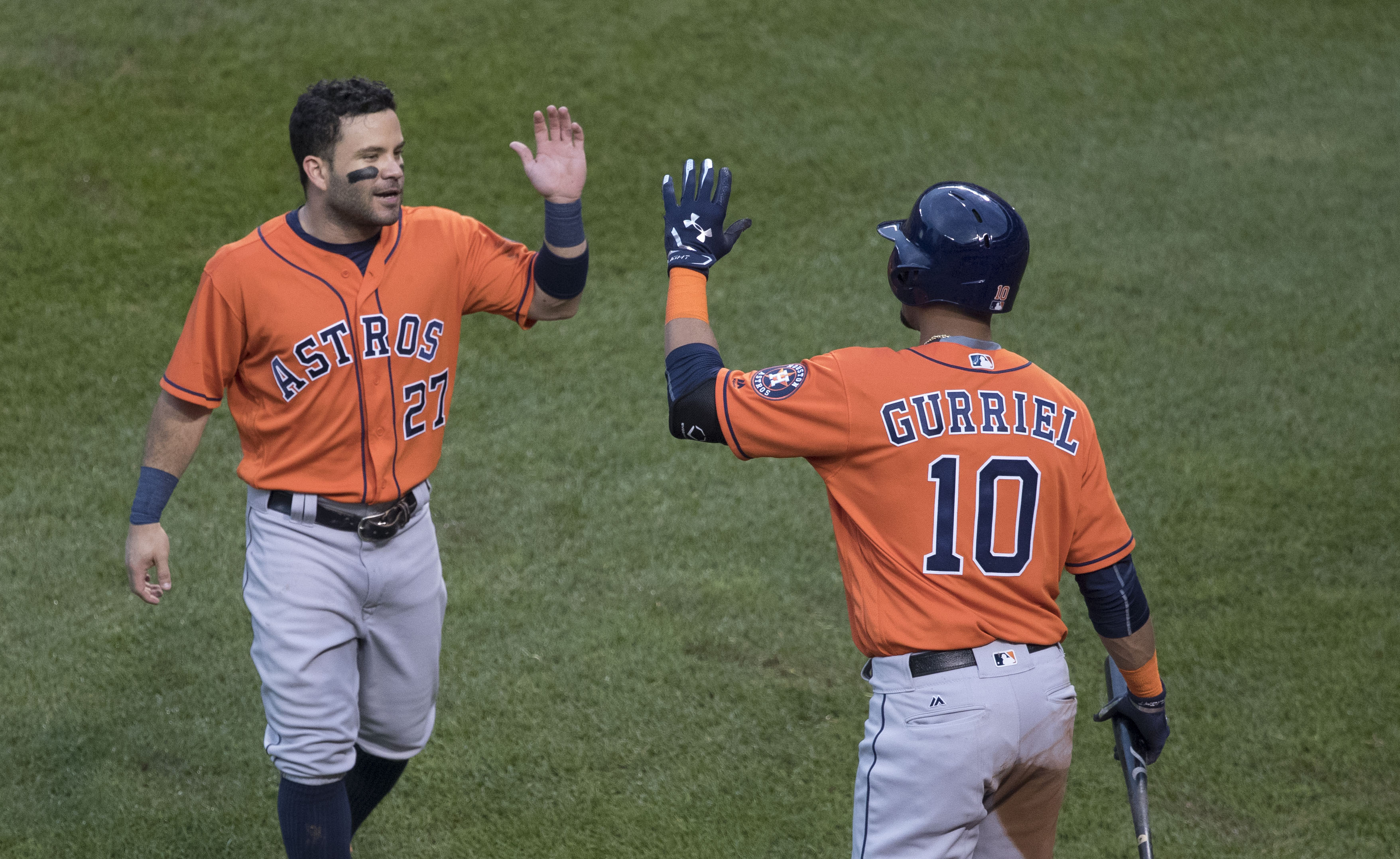
Jose Altuve with Yuli Gurriel during Gurriel's MLB debut.

On August 21, Yuli Gurriel made his major league debut in a 5 to 3 triumph over the Baltimore Orioles. Starting as the designated hitter, Gurriel collected a single off Yovani Gallardo in his first plate appearance. Carlos Correa doubled (30) and collected a stolen base and two RBI, Jake Marisnick homered, and Dallas Keuchel (8–12) diffused five hits over eight innings to earn the victory.

==== Performance overview ====
The Astros finalized the 2016 campaign with an 84–78 record, in third place in the AL West division, and eleven games behind the division-champion Texas Rangers. The Astros trailed the Baltimore Orioles and Toronto Blue Jays by five games for a Wild Card entrance, thus missing the playoffs. Though the Astros missed the playoffs, they posted successive winning seasons for the first time since 2005 to 2006. Moreover, for the second consecutive season, Houston won at least 84 contests, having last accomplished this successively from 2001 to 2005, a then-franchise record. Following the 2016 season, Astros continued to claim at least 84 victories during every non-abbreviated season, (Note: Excluding the 2020 campaign, which was reduced to 60 games as a response to the COVID-19 pandemic.) establishing a new franchise record six in 2021, and remaining in catenation of 10 through 2025.

The Astros became the fifth Major League club to roster three relievers who each converted 12 or more saves (Ken Giles, Luke Gregerson, and Will Harris), tying the major league record. The Astros succeeded the Seattle Mariners from the year prior in achieving this distinction.

Jose Altuve, having attained new career-highs with 108 runs scored, 24 home runs, and 96 RBI, became just the fifth Major Leaguer to attain all of the following during the same season: 30 stolen bases, 100 runs, 200 hits, 40 doubles, 20 home runs, and 90 RBI. Altuve joined Ellis Burks (1996), Larry Walker (1997), Alfonso Soriano (2002), and Jacoby Ellsbury (2011). Moreover, Altuve extended club records with both a third successive season of 200 hits and as league leader in hits, and second batting championship.

Outfielder George Springer became the first player in club history to hammer three grand slams in a single season (April 6, May 14, and June 24).

Following the season, Altuve was recognized with multiple player of the year awards, by The Sporting News, and the MLBPA Players Choice Awards as Major League Player of the Year (first Astro), and AL Outstanding Player, as well as the Majestic Athletic Always Game Award (Altuve's second consecutive). Altuve won his third successive Silver Slugger Award, becoming the first Astro with this distinction. Further, Altuve became the third Astro to receive the Lou Gehrig Memorial Award, succeeding Buddy Bell (1988) and Glenn Davis (1990), and received his second Luis Aparicio Award. Altuve joined Jeff Bagwell in 1994 as the second Astro to receive both The Sporting News MLB Player of the Year Award, and Players Choice Outstanding Player.

Reliever Chris Devenski became the first Astros rookie reliever to accumulate each of 100 innings pitched, 100 strikeouts, and sub-3.00 earned run average (ERA). Just the 12th Major League rookie to accomplish the three, Devenski succeeded Pedro Martinez in 1993 as the most recent.

=== League standings ===
==== American League West ====
AL West
Team	W	L	Pct.	GB	Home	Road
Texas Rangers	95	67	.586	—	53‍–‍28	42‍–‍39
Seattle Mariners	86	76	.531	9	44‍–‍37	42‍–‍39
Houston Astros	84	78	.519	11	43‍–‍38	41‍–‍40
Los Angeles Angels	74	88	.457	21	40‍–‍41	34‍–‍47
Oakland Athletics	69	93	.426	26	34‍–‍47	35‍–‍46

==== American League Wild Card ====
AL Wild Card standings

Division leaders
Team	W	L	Pct.
Texas Rangers	95	67	.586
Cleveland Indians	94	67	.584
Boston Red Sox	93	69	.574

Wild Card teams (Top 2 teams qualify for postseason)
Team	W	L	Pct.	GB
Toronto Blue Jays	89	73	.549	—
Baltimore Orioles	89	73	.549	—
Detroit Tigers	86	75	.534	2½
Seattle Mariners	86	76	.531	3
New York Yankees	84	78	.519	5
Houston Astros	84	78	.519	5
Kansas City Royals	81	81	.500	8
Chicago White Sox	78	84	.481	11
Los Angeles Angels	74	88	.457	15
Oakland Athletics	69	93	.426	20
Tampa Bay Rays	68	94	.420	21
Minnesota Twins	59	103	.364	30

==== Record versus opponents ====
American League

2016 American League record Source: MLB Standings Grid – 2016
Team	BAL	BOS	CWS	CLE	DET	HOU	KC	LAA	MIN	NYY	OAK	SEA	TB	TEX	TOR	NL
Baltimore	—	8–11	4–3	5–1	5–2	1–6	4–2	4–2	5–1	10–9	3–4	1–6	13–6	3–4	9–10	14–6
Boston	11–8	—	3–4	4–2	2–5	5–2	2–4	4–3	4–3	11–8	5–1	4–3	12–7	3–3	9–10	14–6
Chicago	3–4	4–3	—	8–11	7–12	3–3	5–14	2–5	12–7	3–3	5–2	4–3	4–3	4–2	5–1	9–11
Cleveland	1–5	2–4	11–8	—	14–4	3–4	14–5	6–1	10–9	2–5	4–2	3–4	5–1	2–5	4–3	13–7
Detroit	2–5	5–2	12–7	4–14	—	4–2	7–12	2–4	15–4	3–3	4–3	4–3	6–1	2–4	3–4	13–7
Houston	6–1	2–5	3–3	4–3	2–4	—	3–4	13–6	5–2	2–4	13–6	11–8	3–3	4–15	2–5	11–9
Kansas City	2–4	4–2	14–5	5–14	12–7	4–3	—	1–5	15–4	2–5	1–6	3–4	5–2	1–6	2–4	10–10
Los Angeles	2–4	3–4	5–2	1–6	4–2	6–13	5–1	—	2–4	1–6	12–7	8–11	3–4	9–10	4–3	9–11
Minnesota	1–5	3–4	7–12	9–10	4–15	2–5	4–15	4–2	—	2–5	2–4	4–2	3–4	5–2	1–6	8–12
New York	9–10	8–11	3–3	5–2	3–3	4–2	5–2	6–1	5–2	—	4–3	3–3	11–8	3–4	7–12	8–12
Oakland	4–3	1–5	2–5	2–4	3–4	6–13	6–1	7–12	4–2	3–4	—	7–12	5–2	9–10	3–3	7–13
Seattle	6–1	3–4	3–4	4–3	3–4	8–11	4–3	11–8	2–4	3–3	12–7	—	4–2	7–12	3–3	13–7
Tampa Bay	6–13	7–12	3–4	1–5	1–6	3–3	2–5	4–3	4–3	8–11	2–5	2–4	—	4–2	11–8	10–10
Texas	4–3	3–3	2–4	5–2	4–2	15–4	6–1	10–9	2–5	4–3	10–9	12–7	2–4	—	3–4	13–7
Toronto	10–9	10–9	1–5	3–4	4–3	5–2	4–2	3–4	6–1	12–7	3–3	3–3	8–11	4–3	—	13–7

== Game log ==
2016 Game Log: 84–78 (Home: 43–38; Away: 41–40)
April: 7–17 (Home: 4–6; Away: 3–11)

#	Date	Opponent	Score	Win	Loss	Save	Attendance	Record	Streak
—	April 4	@ Yankees	Postponed (snow). Makeup date: April 5.						
1	April 5	@ Yankees	5–3	**Keuchel** (1–0)	Betances (0–1)	**Gregerson** (1)	47,820	1–0	W1
2	April 6	@ Yankees	6–16	Pineda (1–0)	**McHugh** (0–1)	Nova (1)	37,493	1–1	L1
3	April 7	@ Yankees	5–8	Shreve (1–0)	**Harris** (0–1)	Miller (1)	30,003	1–2	L2
4	April 8	@ Brewers	4–6	Anderson (1–0)	**Feldman** (0–1)	Jeffress (2)	30,100	1–3	L3
5	April 9	@ Brewers	6–4	**Fister** (1–0)	Peralta (0–2)	**Gregerson** (2)	28,127	2–3	W1
6	April 10	@ Brewers	2–3	Nelson (1–1)	**Keuchel** (1–1)	Jeffress (3)	28,441	2–4	L1
7	April 11	Royals	8–2	**McHugh** (1–1)	Young (0–2)	—	43,332	3–4	W1
8	April 12	Royals	2–3	Medlen (1–0)	**Fiers** (0–1)	Davis (3)	21,027	3–5	L1
9	April 13	Royals	2–4	Hochevar (1–0)	**Giles** (0–1)	Soria (1)	24,109	3–6	L2
10	April 14	Royals	2–6	Kennedy (2–0)	**Fister** (1–1)	Davis (4)	21,203	3–7	L3
11	April 15	Tigers	1–0	**Keuchel** (2–1)	Pelfrey (0–2)	**Gregerson** (3)	30,092	4–7	W1
12	April 16	Tigers	3–5	Verlander (1–1)	**McHugh** (1–2)	Rodríguez (3)	30,013	4–8	L1
13	April 17	Tigers	5–4	**Fiers** (1–1)	Sánchez (2–1)	**Gregerson** (4)	30,657	5–8	W1
14	April 19	@ Rangers	5–7	Holland (2–0)	**Feldman** (0–2)	Tolleson (4)	24,181	5–9	L1
15	April 20	@ Rangers	1–2	Hamels (3–0)	**Fister** (1–2)	Tolleson (5)	25,821	5–10	L2
16	April 21	@ Rangers	4–7	Griffin (2–0)	**Keuchel** (2–2)	Tolleson (6)	25,886	5–11	L3
17	April 22	Red Sox	2–6	Wright (1–2)	**McHugh** (1–3)	Kimbrel (5)	26,672	5–12	L4
18	April 23	Red Sox	8–3	**Fiers** (2–1)	Buchholz (0–2)	—	40,232	6–12	W1
19	April 24	Red Sox	5–7 (12)	Hembree (1–0)	**Giles** (0–2)	—	32,416	6–13	L1
20	April 25	@ Mariners	2–3	Walker (2–0)	**Fister** (1–3)	Cishek (5)	14,832	6–14	L2
21	April 26	@ Mariners	1–11	Karns (2–1)	**Keuchel** (2–3)	—	13,821	6–15	L3
22	April 27	@ Mariners	7–4	**McHugh** (2–3)	Iwakuma (0–3)	—	14,173	7–15	W1
23	April 29	@ Athletics	4–7	Madson (1–0)	**Sipp** (0–1)	—	20,159	7–16	L1
24	April 30	@ Athletics	0–2	Hahn (1–0)	**Devenski** (0–1)	Madson (8)	23,084	7–17	L2

May: 17–12 (Home: 9–7; Away: 8–5)

#	Date	Opponent	Score	Win	Loss	Save	Attendance	Record	Streak
25	May 1	@ Athletics	2–1	**Fister** (2–3)	Hill (3–3)	**Gregerson** (5)	24,135	8–17	W1
26	May 2	Twins	2–6	Berríos (1–1)	**Keuchel** (2–4)	—	18,243	8–18	L1
27	May 3	Twins	6–4	**McHugh** (3–3)	Meyer (0–1)	**Gregerson** (6)	21,153	9–18	W1
28	May 4	Twins	16–4	**Feldman** (1–2)	Hughes (1–5)	—	20,847	10–18	W2
29	May 5	Mariners	3–6	Vincent (2–1)	**Gregerson** (0–1)	Cishek (9)	20,151	10–19	L1
30	May 6	Mariners	6–3	**Fister** (3–3)	Walker (2–2)	**Gregerson** (7)	25,413	11–19	W1
31	May 7	Mariners	2–3 (10)	Cishek (2–1)	**Sipp** (0–2)	—	31,559	11–20	L1
32	May 8	Mariners	5–1	**McHugh** (4–3)	Iwakuma (1–4)	—	28,148	12–20	W1
33	May 9	Indians	7–1	**Fiers** (3–1)	Kluber (2–4)	—	20,222	13–20	W2
34	May 10	Indians	0–4	Bauer (3–0)	**Devenski** (0–2)	—	23,976	13–21	L1
35	May 11	Indians	5–3 (16)	**Feliz** (1–0)	Anderson (0–3)	—	24,453	14–21	W1
36	May 12	@ Red Sox	1–11	Price (5-1)	**Keuchel** (2-5)	—	34,982	14–22	L1
37	May 13	@ Red Sox	7–6	**Feldman** (2–2)	Barnes (2–2)	**Gregerson** (8)	33,148	15–22	W1
38	May 14	@ Red Sox	5–6 (11)	Uehara (2–1)	**Feliz** (1–1)	—	37,430	15–23	L1
39	May 15	@ Red Sox	9–10	Hembree (2–0)	**Feldman** (2–3)	Kimbrel (10)	35,736	15–24	L2
40	May 17	@ White Sox	6–5 (11)	**Neshek** (1–0)	Albers (1–3)	**Sipp** (1)	13,481	16–24	W1
41	May 18	@ White Sox	5–3	**Fister** (4–3)	Latos (5–1)	**Gregerson** (9)	14,936	17–24	W2
42	May 19	@ White Sox	1–2	Sale (9–0)	**McHugh** (4–4)	—	20,096	17–25	L1
43	May 20	Rangers	1–2	Lewis (3–0)	**McCullers** (0–1)	Dyson (3)	28,724	17–26	L2
44	May 21	Rangers	1–2	Ramos (1–2)	**Fiers** (3–2)	Dyson (4)	35,040	17–27	L3
45	May 22	Rangers	2–9	Hamels (5–0)	**Keuchel** (2–6)	—	35,035	17–28	L4
46	May 24	Orioles	3–2 (13)	**Feliz** (2–1)	Bundy (0–1)	—	24,783	18–28	W1
47	May 25	Orioles	4–3	**Neshek** (2–0)	Wilson (2–3)	**Gregerson** (10)	25,618	19–28	W2
48	May 26	Orioles	4–2	**McCullers** (1–1)	Gausman (0–2)	**Giles** (1)	23,826	20–28	W3
49	May 27	@ Angels	2–7	Shoemaker (3–5)	**Fiers** (3–3)	—	39,047	20–29	L1
50	May 28	@ Angels	4–2	**Keuchel** (3–6)	Weaver (4–4)	**Gregerson** (11)	38,176	21–29	W1
51	May 29	@ Angels	8–6 (13)	**Feliz** (3–1)	Morin (1–1)	**Gregerson** (12)	36,538	22–29	W2
52	May 30	@ D-backs	8–3	**McHugh** (5–4)	Escobar (0–1)	—	24,798	23–29	W3
53	May 31	@ D-backs	8–5	**McCullers** (2–1)	Corbin (2–5)	**Gregerson** (13)	15,556	24–29	W4

June: 18–8 (Home: 9–2; Away: 9–6)

#	Date	Opponent	Score	Win	Loss	Save	Attendance	Record	Streak
54	June 1	D-backs	5–4 (11)	**Feliz** (4–1)	Clippard (2–2)	—	22,642	25–29	W5
55	June 2	D-backs	0–3	Greinke (7–3)	**Keuchel** (3–7)	Ziegler (10)	21,764	25–30	L1
56	June 3	Athletics	12–2	**Fister** (5–3)	Hahn (2–3)	—	26,458	26–30	W1
57	June 4	Athletics	6–5 (12)	**Feldman** (3–3)	Madson (2–2)	—	37,223	27–30	W2
58	June 5	Athletics	5–2	**McCullers** (3–1)	Dull (1–1)	**Harris** (1)	30,817	28–30	W3
59	June 6	@ Rangers	5–6	Dyson (1–1)	**Giles** (0–3)	—	30,021	28–31	L1
60	June 7	@ Rangers	3–4	Diekman (1–1)	**Keuchel** (3–8)	Dyson (8)	32,189	28–32	L2
61	June 8	@ Rangers	3–1	**Fister** (6–3)	Wilhelmsen (2–3)	**Harris** (2)	37,696	29–32	W1
62	June 9	@ Rangers	3–5	Pérez (5–4)	**McHugh** (5–5)	Diekman (1)	30,145	29–33	L1
63	June 10	@ Rays	3–4	Andriese (5–0)	**McCullers** (3–2)	Colomé (18)	13,075	29–34	L2
64	June 11	@ Rays	4–3	**Fiers** (4–3)	Archer (4–8)	**Harris** (3)	19,658	30–34	W1
65	June 12	@ Rays	0–5	Moore (3–4)	**Keuchel** (3–9)	—	11,168	30–35	L1
66	June 14	@ Cardinals	5–2	**Fister** (7–3)	García (4–6)	**Harris** (4)	42,525	31–35	W1
67	June 15	@ Cardinals	4–1	**Sipp** (1–2)	Siegrist (4–2)	**Harris** (5)	42,008	32–35	W2
68	June 17	Reds	2–4 (11)	Hoover (1–1)	**Neshek** (2–1)	Cingrani (8)	37,560	32–36	L1
69	June 18	Reds	5–4 (11)	**Feldman** (4–3)	Smith (0–1)	—	39,111	33–36	W1
70	June 19	Reds	6–0	**Fiers** (5–3)	Finnegan (3–5)	**Devenski** (1)	36,369	34–36	W2
71	June 20	Angels	10–7	**Fister** (8–3)	Chacín (2–3)	**Neshek** (1)	22,553	35–36	W3
72	June 21	Angels	3–2	**Gregerson** (1–1)	Street (2–1)	—	25,004	36–36	W4
73	June 22	Angels	3–2	**Gregerson** (2–1)	Shoemaker (3–8)	**Harris** (6)	29,649	37–36	W5
74	June 24	@ Royals	13–4	**Keuchel** (4–9)	Vólquez (7–7)	—	36,195	38–36	W6
75	June 25	@ Royals	13–5	**Feliz** (5–1)	Young (2–7)	—	38,880	39–36	W7
76	June 26	@ Royals	1–6	Kennedy (6–6)	**Fister** (8–4)	—	36,450	39–37	L1
77	June 27	@ Angels	4–2	**Gregerson** (3–1)	Salas (3–5)	**Harris** (7)	36,839	40–37	W1
78	June 28	@ Angels	7–1	**Feldman** (5–3)	Lincecum (1–2)	—	38,781	41–37	W2
79	June 29	@ Angels	10–4	**Keuchel** (5–9)	Weaver (6–7)	—	36,683	42–37	W3

July: 13–12 (Home: 10–6; Away: 3–6)

#	Date	Opponent	Score	Win	Loss	Save	Attendance	Record	Streak
80	July 1	White Sox	5–0	**Fiers** (6–3)	González (1–4)	—	31,965	43–37	W4
81	July 2	White Sox	6–7	Sale (14–2)	**Fister** (8–5)	Robertson (22)	35,116	43–38	L1
82	July 3	White Sox	1–4	Quintana (6–8)	**McHugh** (5–6)	Robertson (23)	30,379	43–39	L2
83	July 4	Mariners	2–1	**McCullers** (4–2)	Miley (6–5)	**Harris** (8)	29.844	44–39	W1
84	July 5	Mariners	5–2	**Keuchel** (6–9)	Walker (4–7)	**Harris** (9)	21,553	45–39	W2
85	July 6	Mariners	9–8	**Giles** (1–3)	Díaz (0–2)	**Gregerson** (14)	25,709	46–39	W3
86	July 7	Athletics	1–3	Hill (9–3)	**Fister** (8–6)	Madson (17)	20,933	46–40	L1
87	July 8	Athletics	10–9	**Feliz** (6–1)	Madson (3–3)	—	31,438	47–40	W1
88	July 9	Athletics	2–3	Graveman (5–6)	**McCullers** (4–3)	Dull (1)	35,312	47–41	L1
89	July 10	Athletics	2–1 (10)	**Harris** (1–1)	Hendriks (0–2)	—	28,119	48–41	W1
**87th All-Star Game in San Diego, California**
90	July 15	@ Mariners	7–3	**Fister** (9–6)	Paxton (2–4)	—	29,217	49–41	W2
91	July 16	@ Mariners	0–1	Iwakuma (10–6)	**McCullers** (4–4)	Cishek (22)	41,386	49–42	L1
92	July 17	@ Mariners	8–1	**McHugh** (6–6)	Montgomery (3–4)	—	27,322	50–42	W1
93	July 18	@ Athletics	4–7	Graveman (6–6)	**Fiers** (6–4)	Madson (20)	10,651	50–43	L1
94	July 19	@ Athletics	3–4 (10)	Rzepczynski (1–0)	**Neshek** (2–2)	—	15,143	50–44	L2
95	July 20	@ Athletics	7–0	**Fister** (10–6)	Mengden (1–5)	—	20,231	51–44	W1
96	July 22	Angels	2–1	**McCullers** (5–4)	Shoemaker (5–10)	**Harris** (10)	36,453	52–44	W2
97	July 23	Angels	7–2	**McHugh** (7–6)	Weaver (8–8)	—	35,119	53–44	W3
98	July 24	Angels	13–3	**Fiers** (7–4)	Lincecum (2–4)	—	32,721	54–44	W4
99	July 25	Yankees	1–2	Pineda (5–9)	**Keuchel** (6–10)	Miller (8)	30,628	54–45	L1
100	July 26	Yankees	3–6	Sabathia (6–8)	**Fister** (10–7)	Miller (9)	28,134	54–46	L2
101	July 27	Yankees	4–1	**McCullers** (6–4)	Tanaka (7–3)	**Harris** (11)	35,186	55–46	W1
102	July 29	@ Tigers	6–14	Boyd (2–2)	**McHugh** (7–7)	—	31,771	55–47	L1
103	July 30	@ Tigers	2–3	Verlander (11–6)	**Harris** (1–2)	—	34,673	55–48	L2
104	July 31	@ Tigers	0–11	Pelfrey (4–9)	**Keuchel** (6–11)	—	31,045	55–49	L3

August: 16–13 (Home: 7–8; Away: 9–5)

#	Date	Opponent	Score	Win	Loss	Save	Attendance	Record	Streak
105	August 1	Blue Jays	2–1 (14)	**Feliz** (7–1)	Feldman (5–4)	—	20,623	56–49	W1
106	August 2	Blue Jays	1–2	Dickey (8–12)	**McCullers** (6–5)	Grilli (2)	24,399	56–50	L1
107	August 3	Blue Jays	1–3	Estrada (7–4)	**McHugh** (7–8)	Osuna (23)	29,399	56–51	L2
108	August 4	Blue Jays	1–4	Happ (15–3)	**Fiers** (7–5)	Osuna (24)	23,190	56–52	L3
109	August 5	Rangers	5–0	**Keuchel** (7–11)	Pérez (7–8)	—	32,820	57–52	W1
110	August 6	Rangers	2–3	Kela (2–1)	**Devenski** (0–3)	Dyson (24)	42,272	57–53	L1
111	August 7	Rangers	3–5 (11)	Bush (5–2)	**Devenski** (0–4)	—	33,909	57–54	L2
112	August 8	@ Twins	1–3	Duffey (7–8)	**McHugh** (7–9)	Kintzler (10)	20,978	57–55	L3
113	August 9	@ Twins	7–5	**Fiers** (8–5)	Santiago (10–6)	**Giles** (2)	22,261	58–55	W1
—	August 10	@ Twins	Postponed (rain). Makeup date: August 11.						
114	August 11 (1)	@ Twins	15–7	**Fister** (11–7)	Berríos (2–3)	—	25,960	59–55	W2
115	August 11 (2)	@ Twins	10–2	**Devenski** (1–4)	Milone (3–4)	—	24,935	60–55	W3
116	August 12	@ Blue Jays	5–3	**Musgrove** (1–0)	Liriano (0–1)	**Harris** (12)	46,330	61–55	W4
117	August 13	@ Blue Jays	2–4	Sanchez (12–2)	**McHugh** (7–10)	Osuna (26)	47,505	61–56	L1
118	August 14	@ Blue Jays	2–9	Stroman (9–5)	**Fiers** (8–6)	—	47,261	61–57	L2
119	August 16	Cardinals	5–8	García (10–8)	**Keuchel** (7–12)	Oh (12)	30,438	61–58	L3
120	August 17	Cardinals	2–8	Martínez (11–7)	**Fister** (11–8)	—	27,508	61–59	L4
121	August 18	@ Orioles	5–13	Gausman (4–10)	**Musgrove** (1–1)	—	20,288	61–60	L5
122	August 19	@ Orioles	15–8	**Devenski** (2–4)	Jiménez (5–10)	—	34,422	62–60	W1
123	August 20	@ Orioles	12–2	**Fiers** (9–6)	Tillman (15–5)	—	39,373	63–60	W2
124	August 21	@ Orioles	5–3	**Keuchel** (8–12)	Gallardo (4–5)	**Giles** (3)	29,734	64–60	W3
125	August 22	@ Pirates	3–1	**Fister** (12–8)	Taillon (3–3)	**Giles** (4)	24,017	65–60	W4
126	August 23	@ Pirates	1–7	Nova (3–0)	**Musgrove** (1–2)	—	28,760	65–61	L1
127	August 24	@ Pirates	5–4	**McHugh** (8–10)	Cole (7–9)	**Giles** (5)	23,717	66–61	W1
128	August 26	Rays	5–4	**Giles** (2–3)	Colomé (1–4)	—	25,852	67–61	W2
129	August 27	Rays	6–2	**Keuchel** (9–12)	Snell (4–7)	—	36,544	68–61	W3
130	August 28	Rays	4–10	Archer (8–17)	**Fister** (12–9)	—	37,484	68–62	L1
131	August 29	Athletics	6–0	**Musgrove** (2–2)	Manaea (5–9)	—	18,613	69–62	W1
132	August 30	Athletics	3–1	**McHugh** (9–10)	Graveman (10–9)	**Giles** (6)	23,114	70–62	W2
133	August 31	Athletics	4–3	**Feliz** (8–1)	Hendriks (0–3)	**Giles** (7)	20,033	71–62	W3

September: 12–15 (Home: 4–9; Away: 8–6)

#	Date	Opponent	Score	Win	Loss	Save	Attendance	Record	Streak
134	September 2	@ Rangers	8–10	Griffin (7–3)	**Fister** (12–10)	Dyson (31)	35,102	71–63	L1
135	September 3	@ Rangers	4–12	Holland (7–6)	**Musgrove** (2–3)	—	35,538	71–64	L2
136	September 4	@ Rangers	7–6	**Devenski** (3–4)	Darvish (5–4)	**Giles** (8)	46,025	72–64	W1
137	September 5	@ Indians	6–2	**Fiers** (10–6)	Clevinger (2–2)	—	13,062	73–64	W2
138	September 6	@ Indians	4–3	**Hoyt** (1–0)	Kluber (15–9)	**Giles** (9)	11,023	74–64	W3
139	September 7	@ Indians	5–6	Carrasco (11–7)	**Fister** (12–11)	Allen (25)	12,063	74–65	L1
140	September 8	@ Indians	7–10	Bauer (11–6)	**Paulino** (0–1)	Allen (26)	15,275	74–66	L2
141	September 9	Cubs	0–2	Lester (16–4)	**Musgrove** (2–4)	Chapman (33)	33,841	74–67	L3
142	September 10	Cubs	2–1	**McHugh** (10–10)	Lackey (9–8)	**Giles** (10)	41,854	75–67	W1
143	September 11	Cubs	5–9	Arrieta (17–6)	**Fiers** (10–7)	—	31,939	75–68	L1
144	September 12	Rangers	3–4 (12)	Kela (5–1)	**Hoyt** (1–1)	Diekman (4)	22,147	75–69	L2
145	September 13	Rangers	2–3	Claudio (4–1)	**Giles** (2–4)	Scheppers (1)	22,133	75–70	L3
146	September 14	Rangers	8–4	**Musgrove** (3–4)	Holland (7–8)	—	25,041	76–70	W1
147	September 16	@ Mariners	6–0	**McHugh** (11–10)	Hernández (11–6)	—	30,178	77–70	W2
148	September 17	@ Mariners	2–1	**Fiers** (11–7)	Paxton (4–7)	**Giles** (11)	32,304	78–70	W3
149	September 18	@ Mariners	3–7	Miranda (5–1)	**Fister** (12–12)	—	25,383	78–71	L1
150	September 19	@ Athletics	4–2	**Gregerson** (4–1)	Madson (5–7)	**Giles** (12)	10,072	79–71	W1
151	September 20	@ Athletics	2–1 (10)	**Devenski** (4–4)	Doolittle (2–3)	**Giles** (13)	12,139	80–71	W2
152	September 21	@ Athletics	6–5	**McHugh** (12–10)	Mengden (2–8)	**Gregerson** (15)	11,197	81–71	W3
153	September 22	Angels	0–2	Nolasco (7–14)	**Fiers** (11–8)	Bailey (5)	20,022	81–72	L1
154	September 23	Angels	6–10	Ege (1–0)	**Giles** (2–5)	—	29,429	81–73	L2
155	September 24	Angels	4–10	Valdez (2–3)	**Gregerson** (4–2)	—	27,565	81–74	L3
156	September 25	Angels	4–1	**Musgrove** (4–4)	Wright (0–5)	**Giles** (14)	32,958	82–74	W1
157	September 26	Mariners	3–4 (11)	Storen (4–3)	**Gregerson** (4–3)	Vincent (3)	24,107	82–75	L1
158	September 27	Mariners	8–4	**Gustave** (1–0)	Hernández (11–7)	—	23,499	83–75	W1
159	September 28	Mariners	4–12	Paxton (6–7)	**Fister** (12–13)	—	21,187	83–76	L1
160	September 30	@ Angels	1–7	Wright (1–3)	**Peacock** (0–1)	—	30,112	83–77	L2

October: 1–1 (Home: 0–0; Away: 1–1)

#	Date	Opponent	Score	Win	Loss	Save	Attendance	Record	Streak
161	October 1	@ Angels	3–0	**McHugh** (13–10)	Skaggs (3–4)	**Giles** (15)	32,487	84–77	W1
162	October 2	@ Angels	1–8	Chacín (5–6)	**Rodgers** (0–1)	—	28,083	84–78	L1

Legend: = Win = Loss = Postponement
Bold = Astros team member

== Roster ==
2016 Houston Astros
Roster
Pitchers: 50 Kevin Chapman; 47 Chris Devenski; 46 Scott Feldman; 45 Michael Feliz; 35 Josh Fields; 54 Mike Fiers; 58 Doug Fister; 53 Ken Giles; 44 Luke Gregerson; 61 Jandel Gustave; 36 Will Harris; 51 James Hoyt; 60 Dallas Keuchel; 43 Lance McCullers Jr.; 31 Collin McHugh; 59 Joe Musgrove; 37 Pat Neshek; 63 David Paulino; 41 Brad Peacock; 62 Brady Rodgers; 29 Tony Sipp	Catchers: 15 Jason Castro; 11 Evan Gattis; 23 Erik Kratz; 12 Max Stassi; Infielders: 27 Jose Altuve; 2 Alex Bregman; 1 Carlos Correa; 19 Matt Duffy; 9 Marwin González; 10 Yulieski Gurriel; 8,19 Colin Moran; 23 A. J. Reed; 18 Luis Valbuena; 13 Tyler White; 26 Danny Worth	Outfielders: 30 Carlos Gómez; 35 Teoscar Hernández; 16 Tony Kemp; 6 Jake Marisnick; 28 Colby Rasmus; 4 George Springer; 20 Preston Tucker	Manager: 14 A. J. Hinch; Coaches: 52 Craig Bjornson (bullpen); 85 Javier Bracamonte (bullpen catcher); 48 Rich Dauer (first base); 22 Trey Hillman (bench); 39 Dave Hudgens (hitting); 96 Carlos Muñoz (bullpen catcher); 10,8 Gary Pettis (third base); 56 Brent Strom (pitching); 55 Alonzo Powell (assistant hitting)

== Player statistics ==
Table legend
League leader (Bold: MLB leader)	Team leader	*	Left-handed batter or pitcher
League top ten	Leader in appearances at position	#	Switch hitter

=== Batting ===
Legend
GP	Games played	AB	At Bats	R	Runs
H	Hits	HR	Home runs	RBI	Runs batted in
BB	Base on balls (walks)	SB	Stolen bases	AVG.	Batting average
OBP.	On-base %	SLG.	Slugging %	OPS	On-base plus slugging

Individual batting results
⌖	Player	G	AB	R	H	2B	3B	HR	RBI	BB	SB	AVG	OBP	SLG	OPS
C	Jason Castro*	113	329	41	69	16	3	11	32	45	2	.210	.307	.377	.684
1B	Marwin González^{#}	141	484	55	123	26	3	13	51	22	12	.254	.293	.401	.694
2B	Jose Altuve	161	640	108	**216**	42	5	24	96	60	30	.338	.396	.531	.928
3B	Luis Valbuena*	90	292	38	76	17	1	13	40	44	1	.260	.357	.459	.816
SS	Carlos Correa	153	577	76	158	36	3	20	96	75	13	.274	.361	.451	.811
LF	Colby Rasmus	107	369	38	76	10	0	15	54	43	4	.206	.286	.355	.641
CF	Carlos Gómez	85	295	27	62	16	1	5	29	21	13	.210	.272	.322	.594
RF	George Springer	**162**	644	116	168	29	5	29	82	88	9	.261	.359	.457	.815
DH	Evan Gattis	128	447	58	112	19	0	32	72	43	2	.251	.319	.508	.826
OF	Jake Marisnick	118	287	40	62	18	1	5	21	16	10	.209	.257	.331	.588
1B	Tyler White	86	149	24	54	16	0	8	28	23	1	.217	.286	.378	.664
3B	Alex Bregman	49	201	31	53	13	3	8	34	15	2	.264	.313	.478	.791
DH	Preston Tucker*	48	134	11	22	8	1	4	8	8	0	.164	.222	.328	.551
1B	A. J. Reed*	45	122	11	20	3	0	3	8	18	0	.164	.270	.262	.532
3B	Yulieski Gourriel	36	130	13	34	7	0	3	15	5	1	.262	.292	.385	.677
LF	Tony Kemp*	59	120	15	26	4	3	1	7	14	2	.217	.296	.325	.621
OF	Teoscar Hernández	41	100	15	23	7	0	4	11	11	0	.230	.304	.420	.724
IF	Danny Worth	16	39	4	7	2	0	0	1	1	0	.179	.200	.231	.431
C	Erik Kratz	15	29	0	2	1	0	0	0	1	0	.069	.100	.103	.203
IF	Matt Duffy	3	3	0	0	0	0	0	0	0	0	.000	.000	.000	.000
2B	Colin Moran	6	19	0	3	1	0	0	2	1	0	.130	.150	.105	.255
C	Max Stassi	9	13	1	1	1	0	0	0	0	0	.077	.077	.077	.154
P	Collin McHugh	33	6	0	0	0	0	0	0	0	0	.000	.000	.000	.000
P	Doug Fister*	32	5	0	1	0	0	0	2	0	0	.200	.200	.200	.400
P	Dallas Keuchel*	26	2	0	0	0	0	0	0	0	0	.000	.000	.000	.000
P	Lance McCullers Jr.*	14	3	1	1	0	00		0	0	0	.333	.333	.333	.667
P	Scott Feldman*	26	2	0	0	0	0	0	0	0	0	.000	.000	.000	.000
P	Joe Musgrove	11	0	0	0	0	0	0	0	0	0				
**Team totals**		**162**	**5545**	**724**	**1367**	**291**	**29**	**198**	**689**	**554**	**102**	**.247**	**.319**	**.417**	**.735**

=== Pitching ===
Abbreviations

- W — wins
- L — losses
- ERA — earned run average
- G — games pitched
- GS — games started
- SV — saves
- IP — innings pitched
- H — hits allowed
- ER — earned runs allowed
- BB — base on balls allowed
- SO — strikeouts
- WHIP — walks plus hits per inning pitched

Individual pitching results
Player	W	L	ERA	G	GS	SV	IP	H	R	ER	BB	SO
Kevin Chapman	0	0	9.00	9	0	0	8.0	15	8	8	4	6
Chris Devenski	4	4	2.16	48	5	1	108.1	79	26	26	20	104
Scott Feldman	5	3	2.90	26	5	0	62.0	64	27	20	13	42
Michael Feliz	8	1	4.43	47	0	0	65.0	55	33	32	22	95
Josh Fields	0	0	6.89	15	0	0	15.2	23	14	12	3	20
Mike Fiers	11	8	4.48	31	30	0	168.2	187	89	84	42	134
Doug Fister	12	13	4.64	32	32	0	180.1	195	98	93	62	115
Ken Giles	2	5	4.11	69	0	15	65.2	60	32	30	25	102
Luke Gregerson	4	3	3.28	59	0	15	57.2	38	23	21	18	67
Jandel Gustave	1	0	3.52	14	0	0	15.1	13	6	6	4	16
Will Harris	1	2	2.25	66	0	12	64.0	52	17	16	15	69
James Hoyt	1	1	4.50	22	0	0	22.0	16	12	11	9	28
Dallas Keuchel	9	12	4.55	26	26	0	168.0	168	88	85	48	144
Erik Kratz	0	0	9.00	1	0	0	1.0	3	2	1	0	0
Lance McCullers	6	5	3.22	14	14	0	81.0	80	29	29	45	106
Collin McHugh	13	10	4.34	33	33	0	184.2	206	92	89	54	177
Joe Musgrove	4	4	4.06	11	10	0	62.0	59	28	28	16	55
Pat Neshek	2	2	3.06	60	0	0	47.0	33	17	16	11	43
David Paulino	0	1	5.14	3	1	0	7.0	6	4	4	3	2
Brad Peacock	0	1	3.69	10	5	0	31.2	21	15	13	14	28
Brady Rodgers	0	1	15.12	5	1	0	8.1	15	14	14	7	3
Tony Sipp	1	2	4.95	60	0	1	43.2	52	26	24	18	40
Tyler White	0	0	9.00	1	0	0	1.0	1	1	1	0	0
**Team totals**	**84**	**78**	**4.06**	**162**	**162**	**44**	**1468.0**	**1441**	**701**	**663**	**453**	**1396**
Other: Complete games—Keuchel (1), McHugh (1) • Shutouts—Keuchel (1) • Sources:

== Major League Baseball draft ==
Houston Astros 2016 MLB draft selections
Rd.	Slot	Draftee	Position	School	Origin	Signed	Notes	Bio
1	17	Forrest Whitley	Right-handed pitcher	Alamo Heights HS	(Texas)	Y	(Note: MLB debut on April 16, 2024, with Houston)	
2	61	Ronnie Dawson	Outfielder	Ohio State	(Ohio)	Y	(Note: MLB debut on April 14, 2021, with Houston)	
3	97	Jake Rogers	Catcher	Tulane	(Texas)	Y	(Note: MLB debut on July 30, 2019, with the Detroit Tigers)	
4	127	Brett Adcock	Left-handed pitcher	Michigan	(Michigan)	Y		
5	157	Abraham Toro	Third baseman	Seminole State	(Quebec)	Y	(Note: MLB debut on August 22, 2019, with Houston)	
6	187	Stephen Wrenn	Center fielder	Georgia	(Georgia (U.S. state))	Y		
7	217	Tyler Buffett	Right-handed pitcher	Oklahoma State • 2016	(New Mexico)	N	(Note: Signed with the Cincinnati Reds from the 2017 draft.)	
8	247	Nick Hernandez	Right-handed pitcher	Houston	(Texas)	Y	(Note: MLB debut on September 12, 2023, with the San Diego Padres)	
9	277	Ryan Hartman	Left-handed pitcher	Tennessee Wesleyan	(California)	Y	(Note: MLB debut on June 30, 2021, with Houston)	

== Awards and achievements ==
=== Grand slams ===
No.	Date	Astros batter	Venue	Inning	Pitcher	Opposing team	Box
1	April 6	George Springer (Note: 1st MLB grand slam)	Yankee Stadium	2	Michael Pineda	New York Yankees	
2	April 23	Colby Rasmus	Minute Maid Park	5 (Note: Tied score or took lead)	Clay Buchholz	Boston Red Sox	
3	May 14	George Springer	Fenway Park	2	Clay Buchholz	Boston Red Sox	
4	June 24	George Springer	Kauffman Stadium	1	Edinson Vólquez	Kansas City Royals	
5	July 17	Carlos Gómez	Safeco Field	7	Nate Karns	Seattle Mariners	

=== Awards ===
2016 Houston Astros award winners
Name of award		Recipient	Ref.
American League (AL) Player of the Month	June	Jose Altuve	
American League (AL) Player of the Week	April 10	Tyler White	
American League (AL) Player of the Week	April 17	Jose Altuve (Note: Co-winner with Mark Trumbo of the Baltimore Orioles.)	
American League (AL) Player of the Week	April 24	Colby Rasmus	
American League (AL) Player of the Week	June 26	Carlos Correa	
American League (AL) Player of the Week	August 14	Carlos Correa	
Darryl Kile Good Guy Award		Collin McHugh	
Fielding Bible Award	Pitcher	Dallas Keuchel	
Gold Glove Award	Pitcher	Dallas Keuchel	
Houston Astros	Most Valuable Player (MVP)	Jose Altuve	
Houston Astros	Pitcher of the Year	Chris Devenski	
Houston Astros	Rookie of the Year	Chris Devenski	
Lou Gehrig Memorial Award		Jose Altuve	
Luis Aparicio Award		Jose Altuve	
MLB All-Star Game	Starting second baseman	Jose Altuve	
MLB All-Star Game	Reserve pitcher	Will Harris	
Players Choice Awards	Major League Player of the Year	Jose Altuve	
Players Choice Awards	American League Outstanding Player	Jose Altuve	
Players Choice Awards	Majestic Athletic Always Game Award	Jose Altuve	
Silver Slugger Award	Second baseman	Jose Altuve	
The Sporting News Major League Player of the Year		Jose Altuve	
Topps All-Star Rookie Team	Third baseman	Alex Bregman	

Other awards results

Name of award	Voting recipient(s) (Team)	Ref.
AL Most Valuable Player	1st—Trout (LAA) • 3rd—Altuve (HOU)	
AL Rookie of the Year	1st—Fulmer (DET) • 4th—Devenski (HOU)	
Roberto Clemente	Winner—Granderson (NYM) • Nominee—McCullers Jr. (HOU)	

=== American League leaders ===
Batting leaders

- Batting average: Jose Altuve (.338)
- hits: Jose Altuve (216—led MLB)
- Plate appearances: George Springer (744)

Pitching leaders

- Wild pitches: Mike Fiers (17)

=== Milestones ===
==== Major League debuts ====
Player—Appeared at position

- Tyler White, pinch hitter
- Chris Devenski, relief pitcher
- A. J. Reed, designated hitter
- Alex Bregman, third baseman
- Joe Musgrove, relief pitcher
- Teoscar Hernández, center fielder
- Yuli Gurriel, designated hitter

Date and opponent

- April 5 at New York (AL) (Note: Opening Day.)
- April 8 vs Milwaukee
- June 25 vs Kansas City
- July 25 vs New York (AL)
- August 2 vs Toronto
- August 12 at Toronto
- August 21 at Baltimore
Also:
Box

== Minor league system ==
Level	Team	League	Manager
AAA	Fresno Grizzlies	Pacific Coast League	Tony DeFrancesco
AA	Corpus Christi Hooks	Texas League	Rodney Linares
A-Advanced	Lancaster JetHawks	California League	Ramón Vázquez
A	Quad Cities River Bandits	Midwest League	Omar López
A-Short Season	Tri-City ValleyCats	New York–Penn League	Lamarr Rogers
Rookie	Greeneville Astros	Appalachian League	Josh Bonifay
Rookie	GCL Astros	Gulf Coast League	Marty Malloy
Rookie	DSL Astros Blue	Dominican Summer League	
Rookie	DSL Astros Orange	Dominican Summer League	

Awards

- All-Star Futures Game: Alex Bregman
- Baseball America Minor League Second Team All-Star—Pitcher: Joe Musgrove
- Houston Astros Minor League Pitcher of the Year: Brady Rodgers
- Houston Astros Minor League Player of the Year: Alex Bregman
- Pacific Coast League Pitcher of the Year: Brady Rodgers, RHP
- Texas League All-Star—Outfielder: Teoscar Hernández
- Triple-A All-Star Team—Pitcher: Brady Rodgers
- USA Today Minor League Player of the Year: Alex Bregman

== See also ==
- List of Major League Baseball batting champions
- List of Major League Baseball league leaders in hits 3 or more consecutive seasons
- List of Major League Baseball single-inning strikeout leaders
- List of Major League Baseball titles leaders
