= Tyler White =

American baseball player (born 1990)

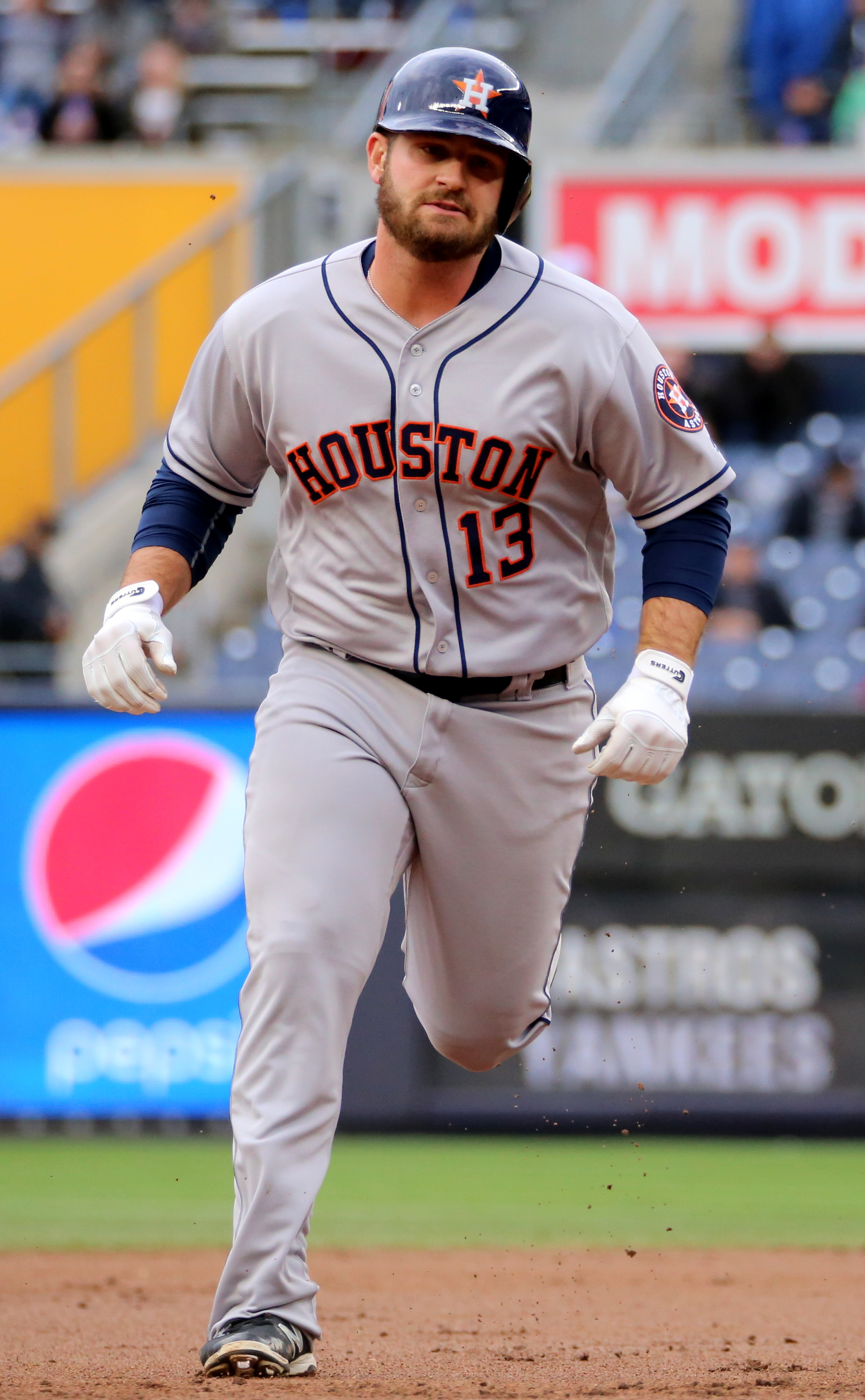
- White with the Houston Astros
- First baseman
- Born: October 29, 1990 (age 35); Mooresboro, North Carolina, U.S.
- Batted: Right Threw: Right

Professional debut
- MLB: April 5, 2016, for the Houston Astros
- KBO: August 23, 2020, for the SK Wyverns

Last appearance
- MLB: August 11, 2019, for the Los Angeles Dodgers
- KBO: September 17, 2020, for the SK Wyverns

MLB statistics
- Batting average: .236
- Home runs: 26
- Runs batted in: 103

KBO statistics
- Batting average: .136
- Home runs: 1
- Runs batted in: 4
- Stats at Baseball Reference

Teams
- Houston Astros (2016–2019); Los Angeles Dodgers (2019); SK Wyverns (2020)

Brian Tyler White (born October 29, 1990) is an American former professional baseball first baseman. He played in Major League Baseball (MLB) for the Houston Astros and the Los Angeles Dodgers, and in the KBO League for the SK Wyverns.

== Career ==
After graduating from Chase High School in Forest City, North Carolina, White played college baseball at Western Carolina University. In 2013, his senior year, he slashed .363/.423/.661 with 16 home runs and 66 RBIs in 59 games. After the season, he was drafted by the Houston Astros in the 33rd round of the 2013 Major League Baseball draft.

=== Houston Astros ===
He spent his first professional season with the Gulf Coast Astros, Greeneville Astros and Tri-City ValleyCats. In 2014, he played for the Quad Cities River Bandits and Lancaster JetHawks. White started 2015 with the Corpus Christi Hooks and was later promoted to the Fresno Grizzlies of the Triple–A Pacific Coast League.

The Astros invited White to spring training in 2016, and included him on their Opening Day roster. He collected his first Major League hit off of Chasen Shreve. In his first six Major League games, he hit .556 (10 for 18) with 2 doubles, 3 home runs, 9 RBIs, a .597 on-base percentage and a 1.167 slugging percentage, and was awarded American League Player of the Week. He was sent down to the Fresno Grizzlies on June 17, 2016. He would play 85 games for the Astros in 2016, finishing with a .217 average, 8 home runs, and 28 RBI.

In 2017, White spent most of his time in the Minors, but still played 22 games with the Astros, compiling a .279 batting average, 3 home runs, and 10 RBI. The Astros finished the year with a 101–61 record, and won the 2017 World Series but White was not on the World Series roster.

In 2018, White spent time in Fresno and Houston, serving as first baseman and designated hitter for the Astros. On August 29, 2018, White hit a walk-off home run against the Oakland Athletics. It was also the 81st total walk-off home run of the 2018 MLB season.

On May 7, 2019, in a blowout from the Kansas City Royals, White pitched a scoreless ninth inning, giving up one walk and striking out Chris Owings in the process. On June 5, 2019, White pitched in another blowout loss to the Seattle Mariners. On June 16, 2019, White pitched for the 3rd time on the season against the Toronto Blue Jays in another blowout loss. On June 26, White pitched again in the 9th inning in a blow out loss to the Pittsburgh Pirates.

On July 19, 2019, Manager A. J. Hinch announced that White would be designated for assignment. Upon his designation, White was hitting .225 with only 3 home runs in 253 plate appearances.

During his time with the Astros, White earned the nickname "Big Puddin'." The name was originally bestowed upon him by Josh Innes, but came to mainstream popularity when on August 28, 2018, White hit a walk off homerun against the Oakland A's. Steve Sparks, of the Houston Astros Radio Network, referred to White as "Big Puddin'." Robert Flores of MLB Network tweeted his approval of the nickname and later referred to White as "Big Puddin'" on the MLB Network. On August 29, 2018 Sportstalk 790 (KBME (AM)), via twitter, asked Astros fans to vote for Tyler White's nickname. "Big Puddin'" won with 53.2% of the vote.

=== Los Angeles Dodgers ===
On July 25, 2019, White was traded to the Los Angeles Dodgers in exchange for Andre Scrubb. He played in 12 games for the Dodgers, and had only one hit in 22 at-bats (.045). He went on the injured list on August 14 with a right trapezius strain He was later shut down for the season and ruled out for the playoffs.

On February 10, 2020, White was designated for assignment. He cleared waivers and was outrighted to the minor leagues. White was released on July 14, 2020.

=== SK Wyverns ===
On July 15, 2020, White signed with the SK Wyverns of the KBO League. He became a free agent following the season.

=== Toronto Blue Jays ===
On December 15, 2020, White signed a minor league contract with the Toronto Blue Jays organization and was invited to Spring Training.

=== Milwaukee Brewers ===
On December 9, 2021, White signed a minor league contract with the Milwaukee Brewers. He was assigned to the Triple-A Nashville Sounds.

=== Atlanta Braves ===
On August 16, 2022, White was traded to the Atlanta Braves in exchange for cash considerations and assigned to the Triple-A Gwinnett Stripers. In 28 games for Gwinnett down the stretch, he hit .227/.357/.352 with 3 home runs and 12 RBI. White elected free agency following the season on November 10.

=== Minnesota Twins ===
On December 5, 2022, White signed a minor league contract with the Minnesota Twins. He began the 2023 season with the Triple-A St. Paul Saints, batting .259/.386/.414 with 2 home runs and 7 RBI.

=== New York Mets ===
On May 28, 2023, White was traded to the New York Mets. In 12 games for the Triple–A Syracuse Mets, he batted .256/.360/.279 with no home runs and 3 RBI. On July 21, White retired from professional baseball.
