= Michael Feliz =

Dominican baseball player (born 1993)

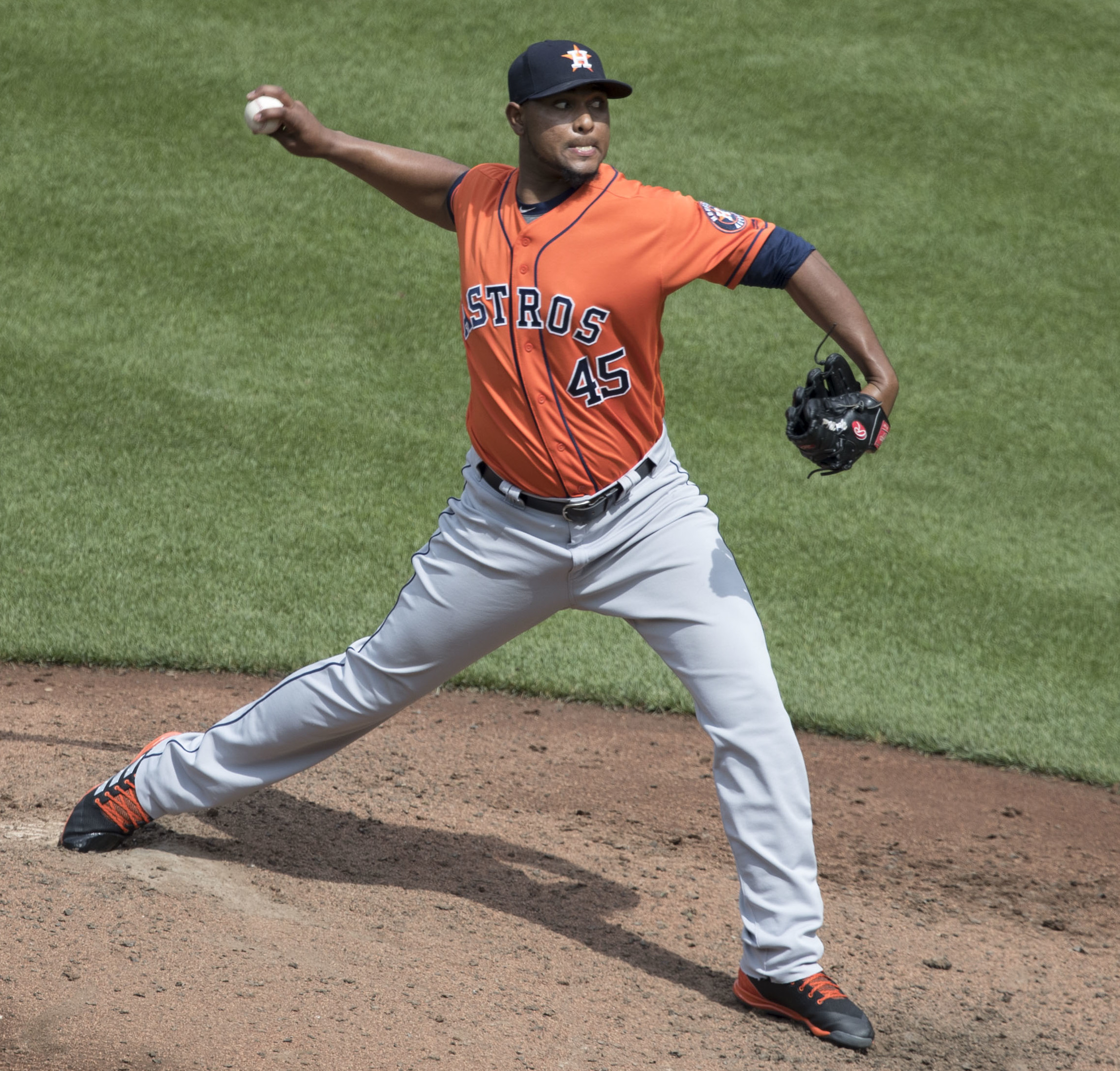
- Feliz with the Houston Astros in 2017

Free agent
- Pitcher
- Born: June 28, 1993 (age 33); Azua, Dominican Republic
- Bats: Right Throws: Right

Professional debut
- MLB: May 31, 2015, for the Houston Astros
- NPB: August 22, 2023, for the Chunichi Dragons

MLB statistics (through 2022 season)
- Win–loss record: 17–9
- Earned run average: 5.29
- Strikeouts: 328

NPB statistics (through 2024 season)
- Win–loss record: 1-1
- Earned run average: 4.26
- Strikeouts: 26
- Stats at Baseball Reference

Teams
- Houston Astros (2015–2017); Pittsburgh Pirates (2018–2021); Cincinnati Reds (2021); Boston Red Sox (2021); Oakland Athletics (2021); Boston Red Sox (2022); Chunichi Dragons (2023–2024)

Michael Feliz Lemos (born June 28, 1993) is a Dominican professional baseball pitcher who is a free agent. He has previously played in Major League Baseball (MLB) for the Houston Astros, Pittsburgh Pirates, Cincinnati Reds, Boston Red Sox, and Oakland Athletics, and in Nippon Professional Baseball (NPB) for the Chunichi Dragons. Listed at 6 feet 4 inches (1.93 m) and 250 pounds (110 kg), he throws and bats right-handed.

== Career ==
=== Houston Astros ===
Feliz signed with the Houston Astros as an international free agent in May 2010. In 2014, he played in the All-Star Futures Game.

Feliz made his MLB debut with the Astros on May 31, 2015. In five relief appearances with the 2015 Astros, he had a 7.88 earned run average (ERA) and struck out seven batters in eight innings pitched.

During spring training in 2016, Feliz beat out James Hoyt for the final spot on the Astros' Opening Day roster. After throwing 107 pitches in relief during the second game of the season, he was optioned back to the minors the next day. On April 25, he was promoted back to the major leagues. Overall with the 2016 Astros, Feliz appeared in 47 MLB games, all in relief, compiling an 8–1 win–loss record with 4.43 ERA while recording 95 strikeouts in 65 innings.

In 2017, Feliz made 46 relief appearances and finished with a 4–2 record and a 5.63 ERA. He was not on the team's postseason roster, as the Astros went on to win the 2017 World Series.

Overall in parts of three seasons with Houston, Feliz struck out 172 batters in 121 innings while compiling a 5.13 ERA in 98 appearances.

=== Pittsburgh Pirates ===
On January 13, 2018, the Astros traded Feliz, along with Joe Musgrove, Colin Moran and Jason Martin, to the Pittsburgh Pirates for Gerrit Cole. Feliz pitched exclusively out of the bullpen for the 2018 Pirates, appearing in 47 games while registering a 5.66 ERA and striking out 55 batters in 47 2/3 innings. In 2019, Feliz recorded an 3.99 ERA while compiling a 4–4 record with 73 strikeouts in 56 1/3 innings, across 57 relief appearances and one start. In the pandemic-shortened 2020 season, Feliz only appeared in three games, allowing six runs on four hits in 1 2/3 innings of work before missing the remainder of the season due to a forearm/elbow strain. In 2021, Feliz recorded a 2.35 ERA in seven games for the Pirates before being designated for assignment on May 9.

Overall in parts of four seasons with the Pirates, Feliz appeared in 115 MLB games while recording 138 strikeouts in 113 1/3 innings with a 5.00 ERA.

=== Cincinnati Reds ===
On May 14, 2021, Feliz was claimed off waivers by the Cincinnati Reds. In nine appearances for the Reds, Feliz struggled to a 16.20 ERA with nine strikeouts. On June 4, Feliz earned the first save of his major league career, against the St. Louis Cardinals. On August 23, Feliz was designated for assignment by the Reds. On August 25, Feliz was placed on release waivers by the Reds.

=== Boston Red Sox ===
On August 28, 2021, Feliz was signed to a minor-league contract by the Boston Red Sox, who assigned him to the Triple-A Worcester Red Sox. Feliz was added to Boston's active roster on September 6. After making four relief appearances with the Red Sox, Feliz was designated for assignment on September 17.

=== Oakland Athletics ===
On September 20, 2021, Feliz was claimed off of waivers by the Oakland Athletics. He recorded one out in his lone appearance for Oakland, without allowing a run. Feliz was designated for assignment by Oakland on September 27. On October 1, he was released by the Athletics.

Overall during 2021, Feliz appeared in 21 MLB games for four different teams, posting a 7.20 ERA while recording 22 strikeouts in 20 innings.

=== Boston Red Sox (second stint) ===
On December 1, 2021, the Red Sox signed Feliz to a minor-league deal, with an invitation to spring training. He began the season with Triple-A Worcester and was added to Boston's major league roster on July 7, 2022. He made one relief appearance for the team and was designated for assignment on July 9. Feliz then declined a minor-league assignment, electing to become a free agent.

=== Minnesota Twins ===
On July 23, 2022, Feliz signed a minor-league contract with the Minnesota Twins. He was released by the Twins organization on August 23. Feliz re–signed with the Twins organization on a new minor league contract on August 25. Feliz made 18 appearances for the Triple-A St. Paul Saints, logging a 3–1 record and 2.19 ERA with 24 strikeouts in 24 2/3 innings pitched. He elected free agency following the season on November 10.

=== Leones de Yucatán ===
On February 27, 2023, Feliz signed with the Leones de Yucatán of the Mexican League. In 9 appearances, he registered a 1–1 record with a 1.08 ERA and 2 saves over 8 1/3 innings. He was released on May 12, in order to pursue an opportunity with an affiliated organization.

=== New York Yankees ===
On May 18, 2023, Feliz signed a minor league contract with the New York Yankees organization. In 13 games for the Triple–A Scranton/Wilkes-Barre RailRiders, he registered a 3.38 ERA with 15 strikeouts and 1 save in 13 1/3 innings pitched. On July 24, Feliz was released by the Yankees to sign with a team in Japan.

=== Chunichi Dragons ===
On July 24, 2023, following his release from the Yankees, Feliz signed with the Chunichi Dragons of Nippon Professional Baseball (NPB). In 19 games for the team, he compiled a 3.14 ERA with 16 strikeouts across 14 1/3 innings pitched. On October 26, 2024, the Dragons announced they would not bring Feliz back for the 2025 season, making him a free agent.

=== Leones de Yucatán (second stint) ===
On March 4, 2025, Feliz signed with the Leones de Yucatán of the Mexican League. In 34 appearances Yucatán, Feliz compiled a 2–1 record and 6.06 ERA with 41 strikeouts and 14 saves across 32 2/3 innings pitched. He became a free agent following the season.

=== Olmecas de Tabasco ===
On April 17, 2026, Feliz signed with the Olmecas de Tabasco of the Mexican League. He made five appearances for Tabasco, struggling to an 11.57 ERA with three strikeouts across 4 2/3 innings of relief. Feliz was released by Tabasco on April 28.
