= Pacific Coast League Pitcher of the Year Award =

Annual award given to the league's best pitcher

- Sport: Baseball
- League: Pacific Coast League
- Awarded for: Best regular-season pitcher in the Pacific Coast League
- Country: United States; Canada
- Presented by: Pacific Coast League

History
- First award: Leo Kiely (1957)
- Most wins: Charlie Hough (2)
- Most recent: Carson Seymour (2026)

The Pacific Coast League Pitcher of the Year Award is an annual award given to the best pitcher in Minor League Baseball's Pacific Coast League based on their regular-season performance as voted on by league managers. Broadcasters, Minor League Baseball executives, and members of the media have previously voted as well. Though the league was established in 1903, the award was not created until 1957. It was issued sporadically through 1974 before being discontinued from 1975 to 2000. After the cancellation of the 2020 season, the league was known as the Triple-A West in 2021 before reverting to the Pacific Coast League name in 2022.

From 1927 to 2000, pitchers were eligible to win the Most Valuable Player Award (MVP). Eleven pitchers won the MVP Award: Bobo Newsom (1933), Willie Ludolph (1936), Fred Hutchinson (1938), Yank Terry (1941), Bob Joyce (1945), Johnny Lindell (1952), Dick Hall (1959), Dennis Lewallyn (1980), Mike Campbell (1987), Donne Wall (1995), and Steve Mintz (1996). Five pitchers have also won the league's Top MLB Prospect Award (formerly the Rookie of the Year Award): George O'Donnell (1953), Lino Donoso (1954), Bob Garber (1955), Bob Anderson (1956), and Félix Hernández (2005). Hernández is the only pitcher to win both awards in the same season. Charlie Hough, the winner in 1970 and 1972, is the only pitcher to win the award on multiple occasions.

Five pitchers from the Tacoma Rainiers have been selected for the Pitcher of the Year Award, more than any other team in the league, followed by the Round Rock Express (4); the Nashville Sounds, Oklahoma City Comets, and Sacramento River Cats (3); the Albuquerque Dukes, Iowa Cubs, and Sugar Land Space Cowboys (2); and the Albuquerque Isotopes, Denver Bears, Edmonton Trappers, Fresno Grizzlies, Hawaii Islanders, Memphis Redbirds, New Orleans Zephyrs, Omaha Storm Chasers, Phoenix Giants, Salt Lake Bees, San Francisco Seals, Spokane Indians, and Vancouver Mounties (1).

Seven players from the Houston Astros Major League Baseball (MLB) organization have won the award, more than any other, followed by the Los Angeles Dodgers organization (5); the Chicago Cubs and San Francisco Giants organization (4); the Milwaukee Brewers and Texas Rangers organizations (3); the Los Angeles Angels and Seattle Mariners organizations (2); and the Athletics, Baltimore Orioles, Boston Red Sox, Kansas City Royals, Minnesota Twins, St. Louis Cardinals, and Washington Nationals organizations (1).

== Winners ==
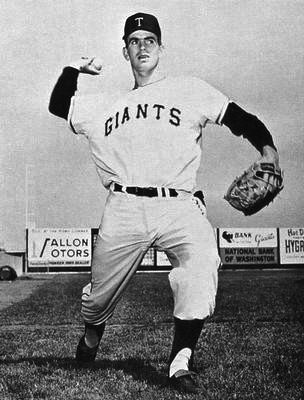
Gaylord Perry, the 1961 winner, won two Cy Young Awards (1972 & 1978) and was inducted into the Baseball Hall of Fame in 1991.

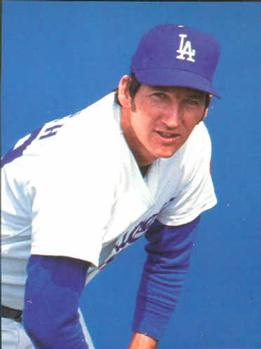
Charlie Hough, the 1970 and 1972 Pitcher of the Year, is the only player to win the award twice.

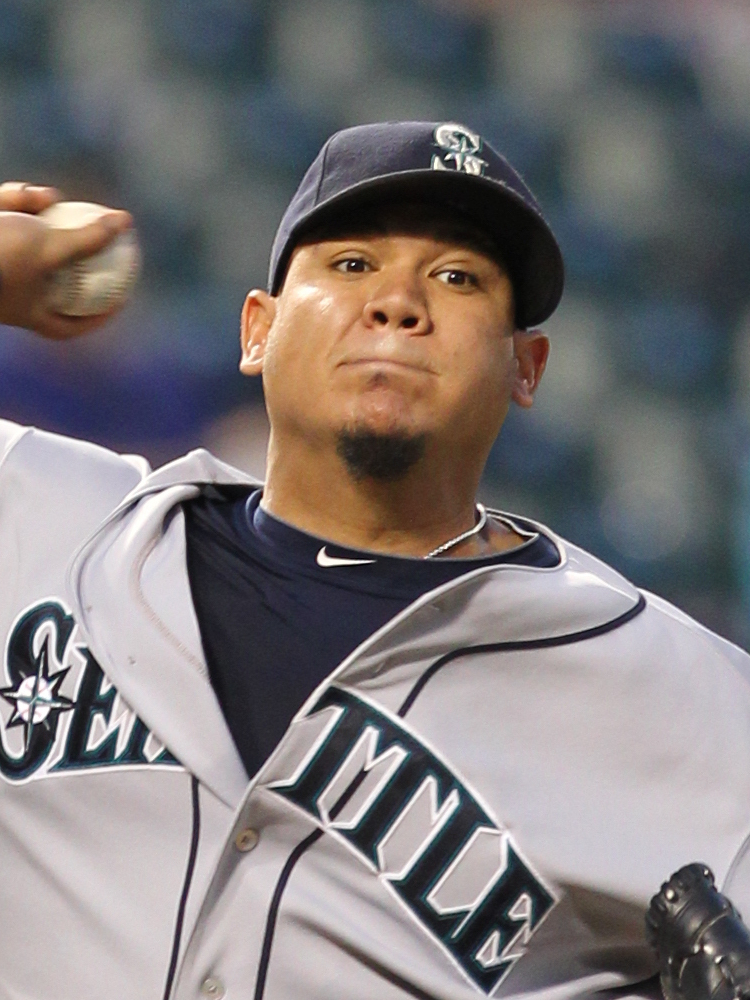
Félix Hernández, the 2005 winner, won the American League Cy Young Award in 2010.

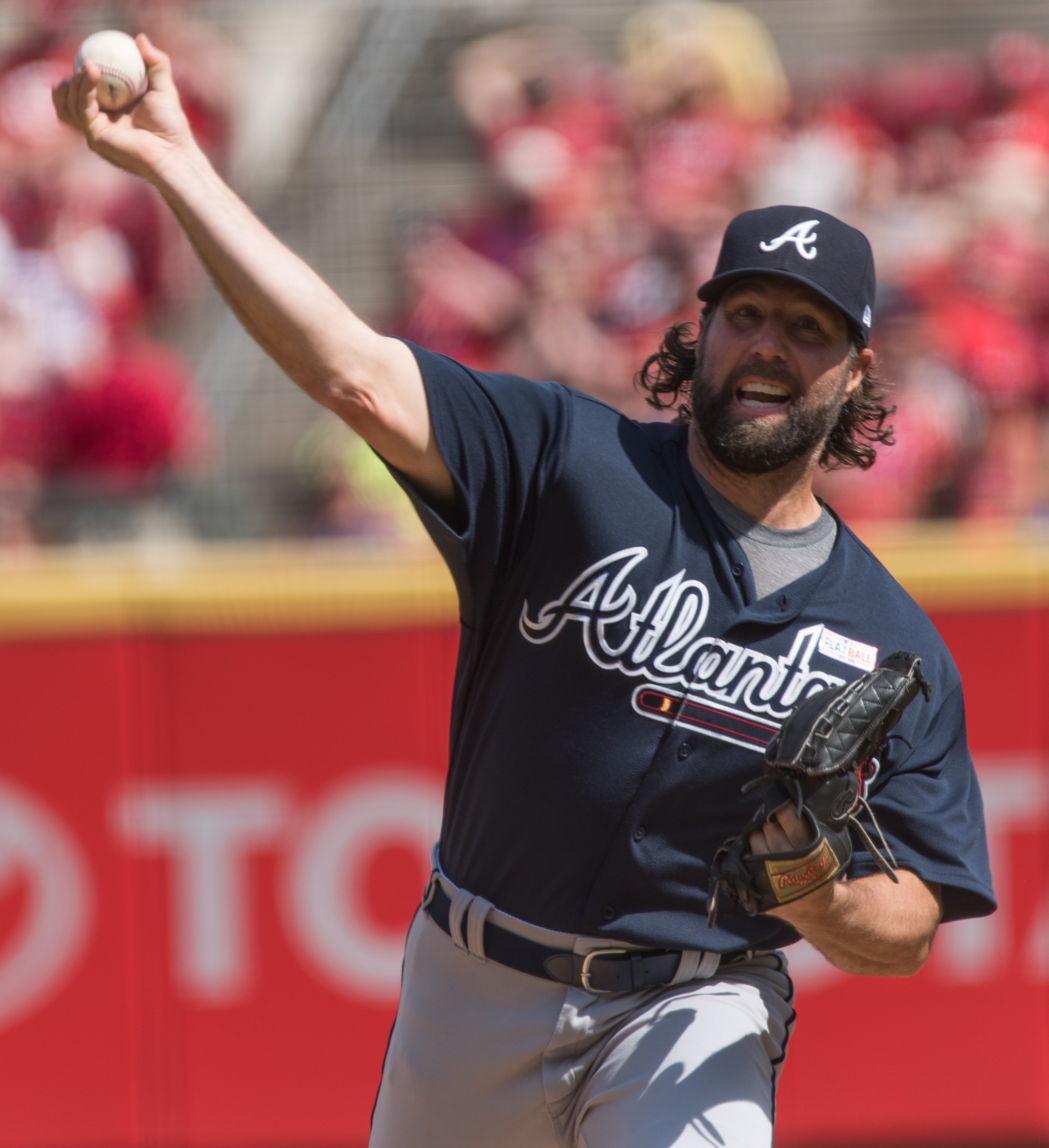
R. A. Dickey, the 2007 winner, won the National League Cy Young Award in 2012.

Key
Record	The pitcher's win–loss record during the regular season
Saves	The number of saves earned by the pitcher, if any, during the regular season
ERA	The pitcher's earned run average (ERA) during the regular season
SO	The number of strikeouts recorded by the pitcher during the regular season
(#)	Number of wins by pitchers who won the award multiple times

Winners
Year	Winner	Team	Organization	Record	Saves	ERA	SO	Ref(s).
1957	Leo Kiely	San Francisco Seals	Boston Red Sox	21–6	0	2.22	38	
1958–1959: None selected								
1960	Chet Nichols Jr.	Vancouver Mounties	Baltimore Orioles	18–6	0	3.65	109	
1961	Gaylord Perry	Tacoma Giants	San Francisco Giants	16–10	0	2.55	95	
1962	Dick Egan	Hawaii Islanders	Los Angeles Angels	17–11	0	3.45	201	
1963–1965: None selected								
1966	Jim Ollom	Denver Bears	Minnesota Twins	20–8	0	3.43	137	
1967	Howie Reed	Oklahoma City 89ers	Houston Astros	19–8	0	2.73	128	
1968	Rich Robertson	Phoenix Giants	San Francisco Giants	18–9	0	2.36	216	
1969	Dick LeMay	Tacoma Cubs	Chicago Cubs	10–8	14	2.82	82	
1970	Charlie Hough (1)	Spokane Indians	Los Angeles Dodgers	12–8	18	1.95	90	
1971	Roberto Rodríguez	Tacoma Cubs	Chicago Cubs	15–8	1	4.01	153	
1972	Charlie Hough (2)	Albuquerque Dukes	Los Angeles Dodgers	14–5	14	2.38	95	
1973: None selected								
1974	Rex Hudson	Albuquerque Dukes	Los Angeles Dodgers	16–4	0	3.80	99	
1975–2000: None selected								
2001	Denny Stark	Tacoma Rainiers	Seattle Mariners	14–2	0	2.37	130	
2002	Jeriome Robertson	New Orleans Zephyrs	Houston Astros	12–8	0	2.55	114	
2003	Justin Duchscherer	Sacramento River Cats	Oakland Athletics	14–2	0	3.25	117	
2004	Scott Downs	Edmonton Trappers	Montreal Expos	10–6	0	3.52	67	
2005	Félix Hernández	Tacoma Rainiers	Seattle Mariners	9–4	0	2.25	100	
2006	Jason Hirsh	Round Rock Express	Houston Astros	13–2	0	2.10	118	
2007	R. A. Dickey	Nashville Sounds	Milwaukee Brewers	13–6	0	3.72	119	
2008	Shane Loux	Salt Lake Bees	Los Angeles Angels of Anaheim	12–6	0	3.98	77	
2009	Bud Norris	Round Rock Express	Houston Astros	4–9	0	2.63	112	
2010	Michael Kirkman	Oklahoma City RedHawks	Texas Rangers	13–3	0	3.09	130	
2011	Luis Mendoza	Omaha Storm Chasers	Kansas City Royals	12–5	2	2.18	81	
2012	John Ely	Albuquerque Isotopes	Los Angeles Dodgers	14–7	0	3.20	165	
2013	Johnny Hellweg	Nashville Sounds	Milwaukee Brewers	12–5	0	3.15	89	
2014	Jimmy Nelson	Nashville Sounds	Milwaukee Brewers	10–2	0	1.46	114	
2015	Carlos Pimentel	Iowa Cubs	Chicago Cubs	12–6	0	2.95	118	
2016	Brady Rodgers	Fresno Grizzlies	Houston Astros	12–4	0	2.86	116	
2017	Wilmer Font	Oklahoma City Dodgers	Los Angeles Dodgers	10–8	0	3.42	178	
2018	Dakota Hudson	Memphis Redbirds	St. Louis Cardinals	13–3	0	2.50	87	
2019	Colin Rea	Iowa Cubs	Chicago Cubs	14–4	0	3.95	120	
2020: None selected (season cancelled due to COVID-19 pandemic)								
2021	Peter Solomon	Sugar Land Skeeters	Houston Astros	8–1	1	4.70	112	
2022	Hunter Brown	Sugar Land Space Cowboys	Houston Astros	9–4	1	2.55	134	
2023	Cody Bradford	Round Rock Express	Texas Rangers	9–2	0	3.63	65	
2024	Jack Leiter	Round Rock Express	Texas Rangers	6–4	0	3.51	110	
2025	Carson Whisenhunt	Sacramento River Cats	San Francisco Giants	9–5	0	4.43	95	
2026	Carson Seymour	Sacramento River Cats	San Francisco Giants	5–2	4	3.79	70	

== Wins by team ==
Active Pacific Coast League teams appear in bold.

Team	Award(s)	Year(s)
**Tacoma Rainiers** (Tacoma Giants/Cubs/Rainiers)	5	1961, 1969, 1971, 2001, 2005
**Round Rock Express**	4	2006, 2009, 2023, 2024
Nashville Sounds	3	2007, 2013, 2014
**Oklahoma City Comets** (Oklahoma City 89ers/RedHawks/Dodgers)	3	1967, 2010, 2017
**Sacramento River Cats**	3	2003, 2025, 2026
Albuquerque Dukes	2	1972, 1974
Iowa Cubs	2	2015, 2019
**Sugar Land Space Cowboys** (Sugar Land Skeeters)	2	2021, 2022
**Albuquerque Isotopes**	1	2012
Denver Bears	1	1966
Edmonton Trappers	1	2004
Fresno Grizzlies	1	2016
Hawaii Islanders	1	1962
Memphis Redbirds	1	2018
New Orleans Zephyrs	1	2002
Omaha Storm Chasers	1	2011
Phoenix Giants	1	1968
**Salt Lake Bees**	1	2008
San Francisco Seals	1	1957
Spokane Indians	1	1970
Vancouver Mounties	1	1960

== Wins by organization ==
Active Pacific Coast League–Major League Baseball affiliations appear in bold.

Organization	Award(s)	Year(s)
**Houston Astros**	7	1967, 2002, 2006, 2009, 2016, 2021, 2022
**Los Angeles Dodgers**	5	1970, 1972, 1974, 2012, 2017
Chicago Cubs	4	1969, 1971, 2015, 2019
**San Francisco Giants**	4	1961, 1968, 2025, 2026
Milwaukee Brewers	3	2007, 2013, 2014
**Texas Rangers**	3	2010, 2023, 2024
**Los Angeles Angels**	2	1962, 2008
**Seattle Mariners**	2	2001, 2005
**Athletics** (Oakland Athletics)	1	2003
Baltimore Orioles	1	1960
Boston Red Sox	1	1957
Kansas City Royals	1	2011
Minnesota Twins	1	1966
St. Louis Cardinals	1	2018
Washington Nationals (Montreal Expos)	1	2004
