= Brady Rodgers =

American baseball player (born 1990)

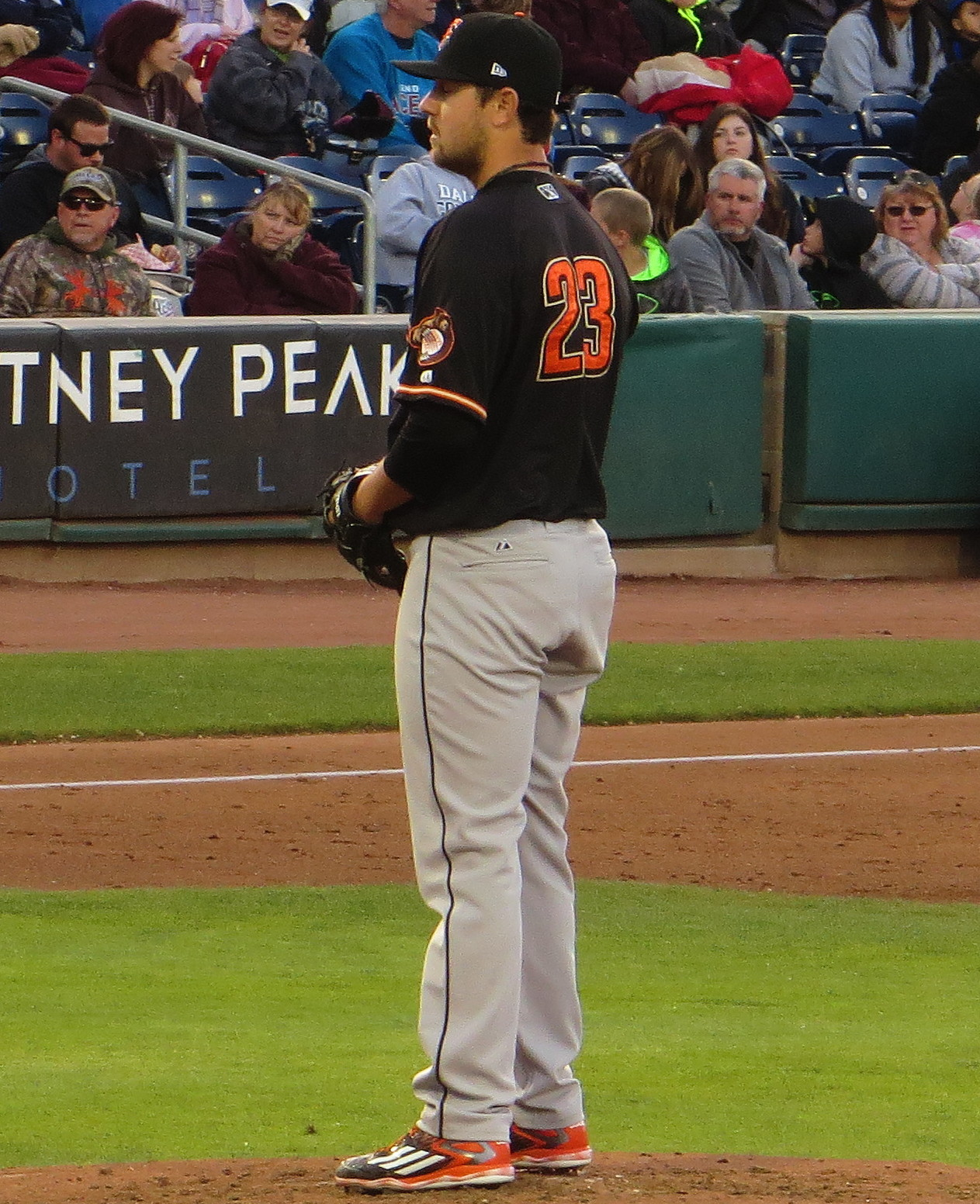
- Rodgers with the Fresno Grizzlies in 2016
- Pitcher
- Born: September 17, 1990 (age 35); Richmond, Texas, U.S.
- Batted: Right Threw: Right

MLB debut
- September 3, 2016, for the Houston Astros

Last MLB appearance
- June 5, 2019, for the Houston Astros

MLB statistics
- Win–loss record: 0–1
- Earned run average: 15.53
- Strikeouts: 7
- Stats at Baseball Reference

Teams
- Houston Astros (2016, 2019)

Brady Paul Rodgers (born September 17, 1990) is an American former professional baseball pitcher. He played in Major League Baseball (MLB) for 2 seasons for the Houston Astros.

== Career ==
=== Amateur ===
Rodgers was drafted by the Milwaukee Brewers in the 39th round of the 2009 Major League Baseball draft out of Lamar Consolidated High School in Rosenberg, Texas. He did not sign and played college baseball at Arizona State University. In 2010, he played collegiate summer baseball with the Cotuit Kettleers of the Cape Cod Baseball League. He ended his career at ASU with a 2.39 earned run average (ERA) which was the second lowest in school history behind Floyd Bannister.

=== Houston Astros ===
The Houston Astros selected Rodgers in the third round of the 2012 MLB draft. He made his professional debut with the Tri-City ValleyCats. He pitched most of 2013 with the Lancaster JetHawks but also made one start for the Double-A Corpus Christi Hooks and Triple-A Oklahoma City RedHawks. Rodgers spent 2014 with Corpus Christi and made one start with Oklahoma City. In 2015 and 2016, he played for the Triple-A Fresno Grizzlies. Rodgers won the 2016 Pacific Coast League Pitcher of the Year Award. Rodgers was promoted to the major leagues for the first time on September 2, 2016.

On March 15, 2017, Rodgers was optioned to the Fresno Grizzlies of the Triple–A Pacific Coast League. On May 2, 2017, Rodgers underwent Tommy John surgery, ending his 2017 season. He returned in 2018 to pitch for the Buies Creek Astros and Fresno. He opened the 2019 season with the Round Rock Express. On May 21, he was called up to the major league roster.

On August 22, 2019, Rodgers was designated for assignment. On August 23, the Astros released Rodgers.

=== Baltimore Orioles ===
On January 23, 2020, Rodgers signed a minor league contract with the Baltimore Orioles. Rodgers did not play in a game in 2020 due to the cancellation of the minor league season because of the COVID-19 pandemic. He became a free agent on November 2.
