= Jimmy Nelson (baseball) =

American baseball player (born 1989)

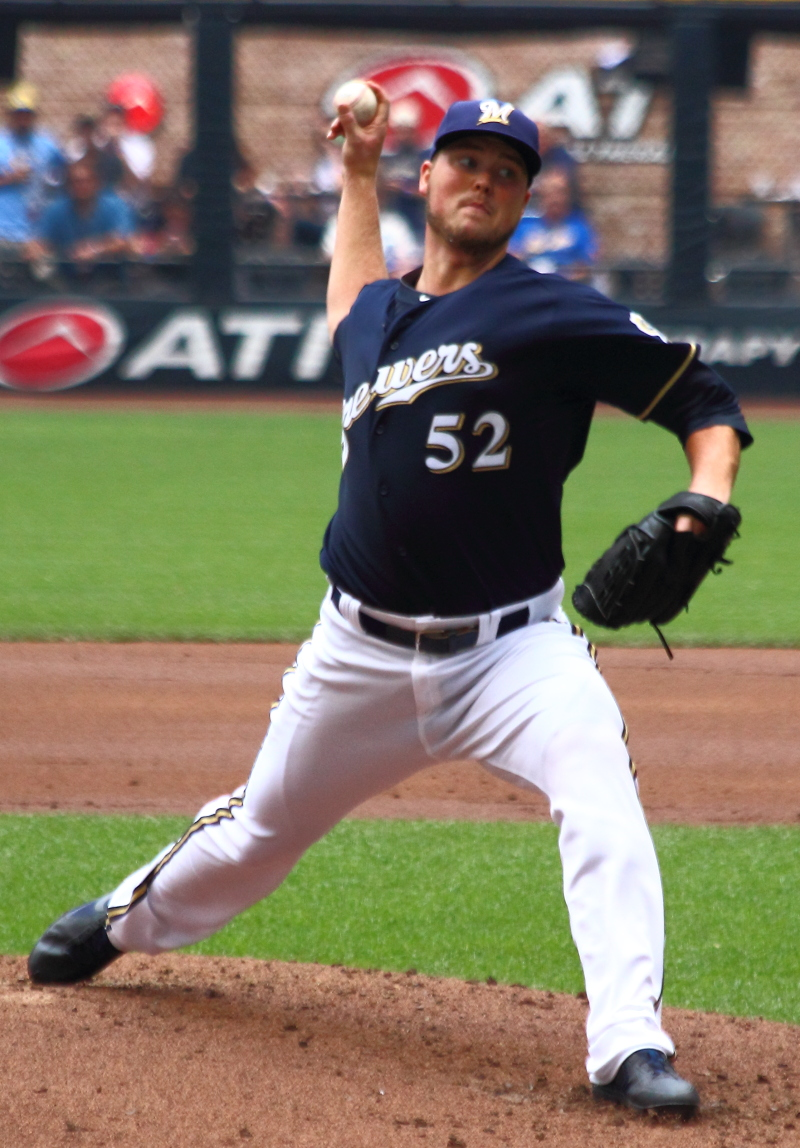
- Nelson with the Milwaukee Brewers in 2014
- Pitcher
- Born: June 5, 1989 (age 37); Klamath Falls, Oregon, U.S.
- Batted: Right Threw: Right

MLB debut
- September 6, 2013, for the Milwaukee Brewers

Last MLB appearance
- July 30, 2021, for the Los Angeles Dodgers

MLB statistics
- Win–loss record: 34–48
- Earned run average: 4.12
- Strikeouts: 622
- Stats at Baseball Reference

Teams
- Milwaukee Brewers (2013–2017, 2019); Los Angeles Dodgers (2021)

James Jacob Nelson (born June 5, 1989) is an American former professional baseball pitcher. He played in Major League Baseball (MLB) for the Milwaukee Brewers and Los Angeles Dodgers.

== Amateur career ==
Nelson attended Niceville High School in Niceville, Florida. The Cincinnati Reds selected Nelson in the 39th round of the 2007 Major League Baseball draft, but he did not sign with the Reds. He attended the University of Alabama, and played college baseball for the Alabama Crimson Tide. In 2010, his junior year, he had a 9–3 win–loss record with a 4.01 earned run average (ERA) in 18 games (17 starts).

== Professional career ==
=== Milwaukee Brewers ===
The Milwaukee Brewers selected Nelson in the second round of the 2010 Major League Baseball draft.

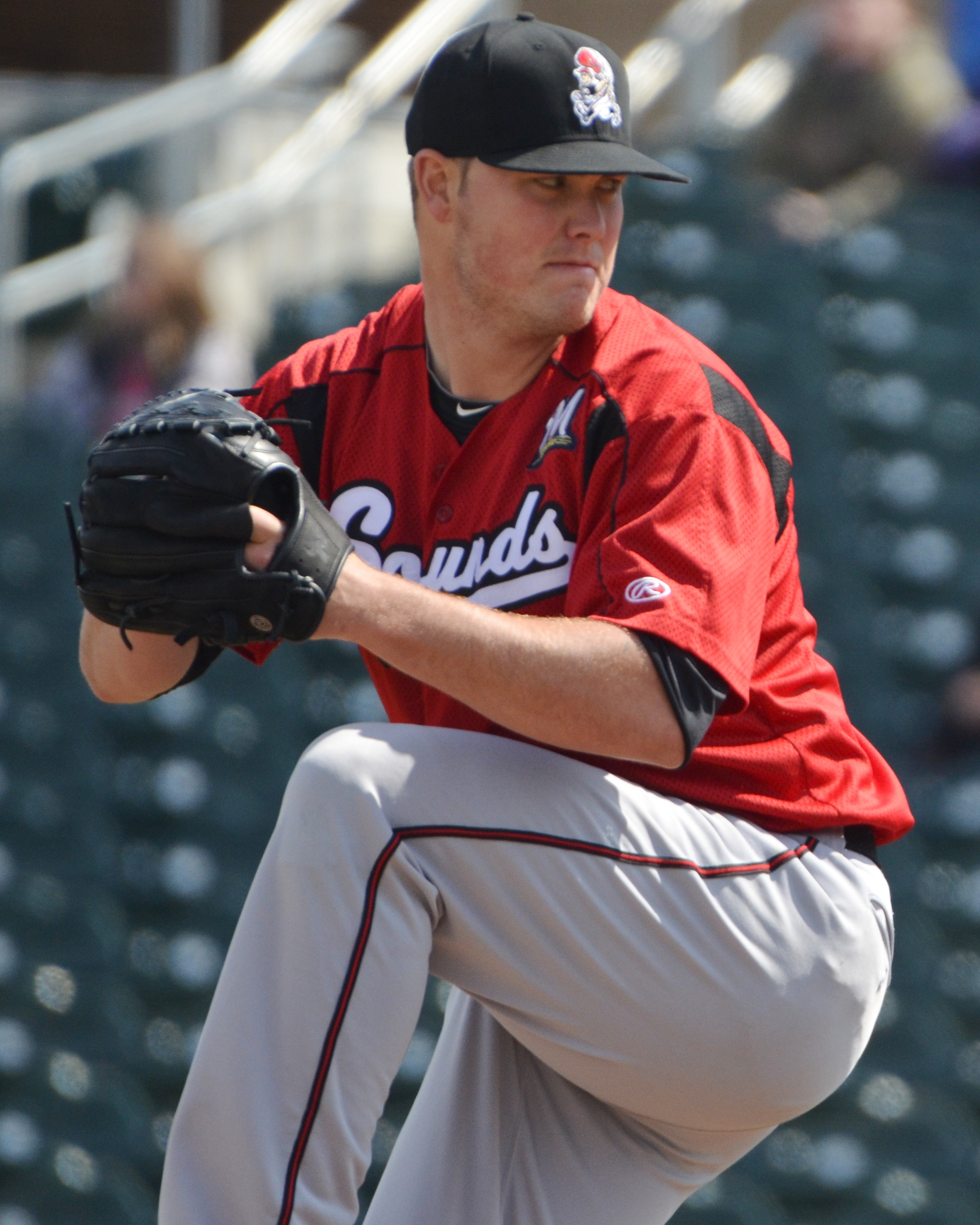
Nelson pitching for the Nashville Sounds in 2014

Nelson started the 2013 season with the Double-A Huntsville Stars. He was promoted to the Triple-A Nashville Sounds on June 5. He was promoted to the majors on September 3, made his debut on September 6, and made his first major league start on September 28.

Prior to the 2014 season, Nelson was rated the Brewers' top prospect and 96th best prospect in baseball by Baseball America. Nelson began 2014 back at Triple-A Nashville, and dominated the Pacific Coast League to the tune of a 10–2 record, 1.46 ERA, and 114 strikeouts. Nelson was even named 2014 PCL Pitcher of the Year. He made one spot start for Milwaukee against the Miami Marlins due to a minor injury suffered by Yovani Gallardo on May 25, and recorded his first major league win, pitching 5 2/3 scoreless innings with 3 walks and 6 strikeouts.

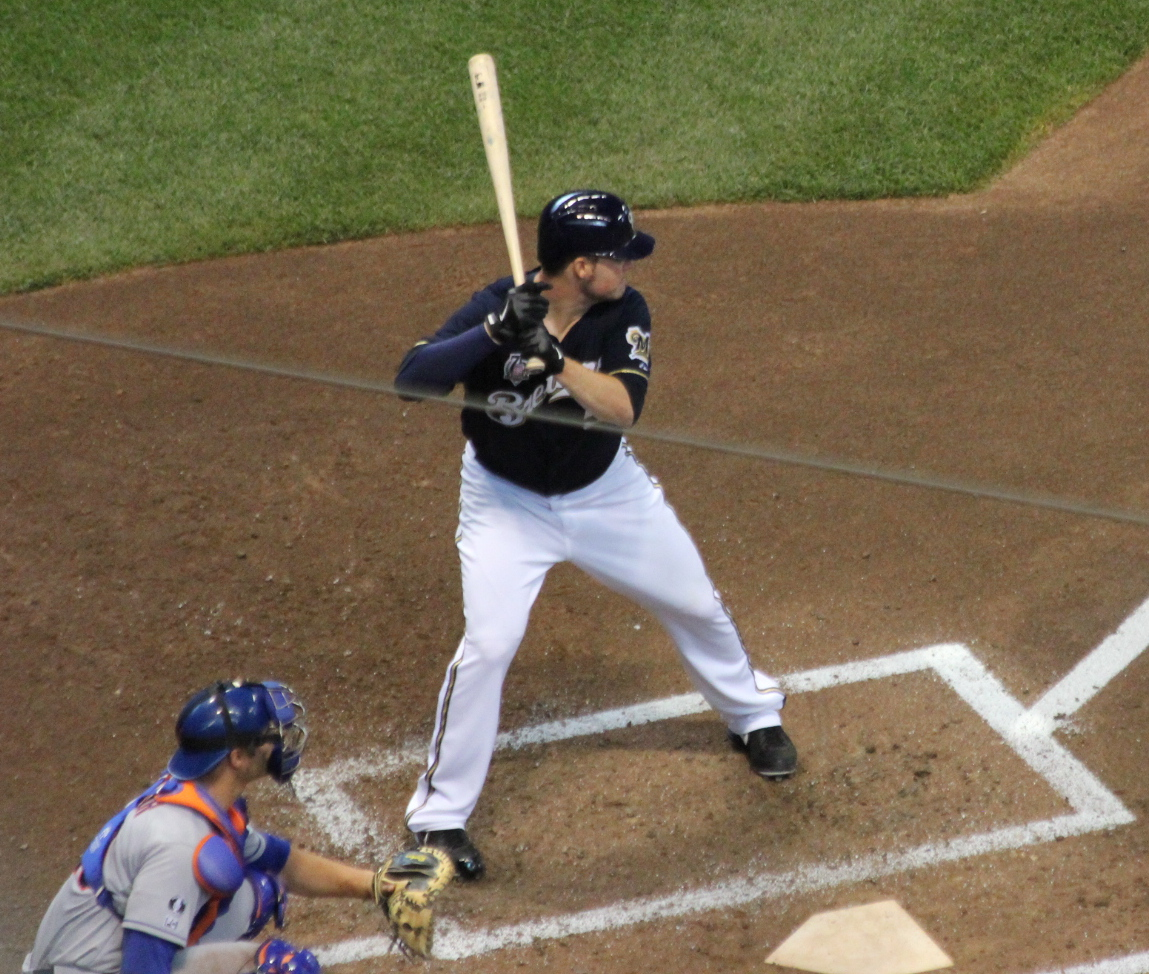
Nelson at the plate during his first career hit

On July 10, Nelson was recalled again to join the starting rotation in place of the home run-prone Marco Estrada. He got his first career base hit during his July 17 start. Nelson sustained an injury on September 17 against the St. Louis Cardinals when Tommy Pham hit a line drive that ricocheted off his head. Nelson was able to leave the field in his own ability, and a magnetic resonance image (MRI) revealed a contusion. In 2015 he had an ERA of 4.11 and shared the major league lead in hit batsmen, with 13.

In 2016 he had an ERA of 4.62 and shared the major league lead in hit batsmen, with 17.

On September 8, 2017, Nelson suffered an apparent shoulder injury while sliding to first base, and left the game. The next day, on September 9, it was revealed that he was diagnosed with a right rotator cuff strain and a partial anterior labrum tear, meaning that he would take no further part in any action for the remainder of the 2017 season. Nelson finished the 2017 year with a 12–6 record, 199 strikeouts, and a 3.49 ERA.

On December 2, 2019, Nelson was non-tendered and became a free agent.

=== Los Angeles Dodgers ===
On January 7, 2020, Nelson signed a one-year, $1.25 million, contract with the Los Angeles Dodgers that also included an option for 2021. On July 6, it was announced that Nelson would undergo surgery on his lower back and would miss the entire season.

On October 30, 2020, the Dodgers declined their team option on Nelson's contract for the 2021 season, making him a free agent without having thrown a pitch for the organization. On December 11, 2020, Nelson re-signed with the Dodgers on a minor league contract. On March 25, 2021, Nelson was selected to the 40-man roster. Nelson pitched in 28 games for the Dodgers with a 1–2 record and a 1.86 ERA with 44 strikeouts and only 13 walks but he was unable to remain healthy. He missed 18 games with forearm inflammation and another 14 with a left lumbar strain before he was shut down in early August when it was determined that he would need both Tommy John surgery and a flexor tendon repair in his right arm.

On March 15, 2022, Nelson signed a one-year contract to return to the Dodgers, which contained a club option for the 2023 season. He remained on the injured list all season and the Dodgers declined his option following the season on November 8.

On February 16, 2023, Nelson re-signed with the Dodgers on a one-year, $1.2 million contract plus bonuses. However, he again remained on the injured list all season.

=== Scouting report ===
Nelson throws four pitches. He relies primarily on his sinker (95 mph), fourseam fastball (94 mph) and slider (84 mph). He also occasionally throws a change up (88 mph).

== Coaching career ==
On April 15, 2025, it was announced that Nelson would be the pitching coach for the Frederick Keys of the MLB Draft League for their upcoming season.

On January 22, 2026, Nelson was announced as the assistant pitching coach for the St. Lucie Mets, the Single-A affiliate of the New York Mets.

== Personal life ==
Nelson is a Christian. Nelson married longtime girlfriend Melissa Conway on December 10, 2016, in Nashville, Tennessee. They have twin daughters.
