= Homeschooling in the United States =

Homeschooling in the United States is the practice of educating children at home, where students do not attend a formal school. As a form of alternative education, homeschooling normally takes the form of parents teaching their children through direct tutoring, religious teachings, experimental or unstructured learning methods.

The US has a long tradition of homeschooling, beginning in the colonial period, where families educated their children at home in absence of local schools. In the US today about 3.3% of K-12 age students are homeschooled. The number of homeschoolers in the US has recently increased in the years following the COVID-19 pandemic. From 2024 to 2025, homeschooling increased by 4.9%.

== History ==
Homeschooling in the US began during the colonial period; mass public education did not become popular until the middle of the 19th century.

On-going debate among historians has attributed the popularity of homeschooling to religious groups in the US, but it is unclear the magnitude of this driver on homeschooling activities in the early period of the US.

Resistance to laws mandating school attendance emerged as early as the end of the nineteenth century. Catholic groups in particular resisted the enforcement of Protestant ideals in public schools, as was observed in the 1844 Philadelphia nativist riots. Philadelphia's Roman Catholic bishop requested that Catholic schoolchildren be permitted to read the Catholic Douay bible in school rather than the Protestant King James Version, which was granted. This decision fanned anti-Catholic sentiment, sparking a rumor that Catholics were attempting to remove the Christian Bible from schools. Toledo, Ohio, minister Patrick Francis Quigley was put on trial in 1891 for resisting the requirement to report the names of students at his school, which he was principal of; he argued unsuccessfully that "the state has no right to control the education of the child." Resistance to mandatory schooling was sporadic throughout the 19th century as the state undertook more responsibility in protecting the rights of children.

Homeschooling, or home tutoring for wealthy children, was slowly replaced by mass public education in the 19th and 20th centuries, as universal schooling became a feature of the modern state.

In 1913, the US Bureau of Education established the Home Education Division, an organization that worked with the National Council of Mothers and Parent-Teacher Associations to provide home curriculum materials; these were meant to supplement, not substitute, for public schooling. In the early 20th century, the headmaster of Baltimore's Calvert School, Virgil Hillyer, recognized that various students at his school were unable to attend due to ill health and began to send out lesson plans to those students' parents. The Calvert method became a popular early home curriculum. Its advertising in periodicals such as McClure's admonished parents that the curriculum was necessary to provide a proper education. This form of homeschooling was targeted primarily at those who needed to educate their children at home due to ill health, and many of their materials were dispatched to hospitals. In 1940, remote education began to be delivered via telephone.

The mid-century interest in homeschooling was supported by a number of factors including the isolation of suburban geographies, the civil rights movement and resulting school desegregation, and reported government skepticism through the 1960s and 1970s. In 1979, the Wall Street Journal quoted an estimate that approximately 10,000 families how were teaching their children at home. The 1979 Wall Street Journal article cited "religious, political, and social convictions, or simply disgust at conditions in public or private schools" as reasons parents gave for homeschooling their children.

In the 1960s, theonomist Rousas John Rushdoony began to advocate homeschooling, which he saw as a way to combat the increasingly secular nature of the public school system in the United States. He vigorously attacked progressive school reformers such as Horace Mann and John Dewey and argued for the dismantling of the state's influence in education in three works: Intellectual Schizophrenia, The Messianic Character of American Education, and The Philosophy of the Christian Curriculum. Rushdoony was frequently used as an expert witness by the Home School Legal Defense Association (HSLDA) in court cases. He often advocated the use of private schools. The HSLDA, founded in 1983, was highly successful in influencing the legal status of homeschooling in the United States. In the 1980s, homeschooling was illegal throughout much of the United States for parents who were not themselves trained educators. Today, the United States has some of the most lax laws around homeschooling, with most states requiring little to no oversight and no educational requirements for parents. Homeschooling is legal in all 50 states in the United States. Each state must follow regulations set by their states. In Ohio, it is sufficient for parents to have completed their secondary education and to report to the administration, whereas in California they must have received training.

Prominent right-wing evangelical pastor and activist Jerry Falwell sought to terminate sex education and discussions of evolutionary biology from American school curricula, instead recommending replacing both topics with prayer and Christian Bible study. The movement embraced claims by Christian parents who advocated for homeschooling, such as Raymond and Dorothy Moore. Another influential figure associated with the rise of the homeschooling movement was John Holt. Holt believed that informal education was better than compulsory education and expressed these views in his books How Children Fail and How Children Learn. Holt advocated for unschooling, whereby children learn without any formalized curricula or expectations. As homeschooling caught on in Evangelical Christian circles, the number of children being homeschooled increased massively, with some estimates suggesting the number went from under twenty thousand in the 1970s to nearly 500,000 by the end of the 1980s.

== Prevalence ==
Estimates for students currently being homeschooled are inaccurate, as a number of states do not require families to report that their child will not attend a formal education institute. While the figures for students in homeschooling are mixed, it was estimated homeschooling peaked in 2020, at about 5.4% of all American school-aged children. The survey defined homeschooled students where parents reported them as being schooled at home instead of at a public or private school for at least part of their education; and if their part-time enrollment in public or private school did not exceed 25 hours a week. This excluded students who were schooled at home primarily because of a temporary illness.

Around a fifth of homeschoolers are co-enrolled in public schools. Some students take one or two classes at traditional school campuses while others spend several days per week on campuses designed to educate part-time students.

In August 2020, Gallup released a poll indicating that 10% of parents planned to homeschool in the coming year, reflecting a rise in alternative education alongside the shift to virtual schooling during the COVID-19 lockdown policies.

Only about 10% of homeschool families use homeschool from Kindergarten through the end of high school. For many families, homeschooling is a temporary situation, with traditional public schools, charter schools, and private schools providing the main part of the student's education. About 30% of adults who had ever been homeschooled did so only for one or two years.

== Motivation ==
Motivations for homeschooling in the US (2025)
Motivation	Percentage of parents
A concern about the school environment	83%
A desire to provide moral instruction	75%
A desire to emphasize family life	72%
A dissatisfaction with academic instruction at other schools	72%
Prefer to provide religious instruction	53%
Interest in nontraditional approach	50%
Child has special needs	21%
Child has physical or mental problem	15%
Other	13%

Parents give many different reasons for homeschooling their children. Parents continually rank concern about the school environment, to provide religious or moral instruction, and dissatisfaction with the academic instruction available at other schools, as the most important motivations for homeschooling.

From 2003 to 2007, the percentage of students whose parents reported homeschooling to provide religious or moral instruction increased from 72 percent to 83 percent, although this number has been declining. It is currently reported only 53% of cite religious instruction as a motivation. Typically the religious belief being represented is evangelical Christian.

Other reasons include more flexibility in educational practices and family core stability for children with learning disabilities or prolonged chronic illnesses, or for children of missionaries, military families, or families who move often.

== Student outcomes ==
=== Academic performance ===
In a review of existing studies on homeschooled students in the US population, the overall impact of this educational method indicates a near zero difference with publicly educated students, across a variety of metrics, included higher education outcomes. Despite these claims, studying the outcomes of students in homeschooling programs in the US is difficult due to a lack of transparency in reporting test scores by homeschooling parents, bias in grading, a lack of demographic information, and a non-randomized sample of students. There is limited evidence, from small samples, that homeschooled children perform better on the ACT or SAT, but these studies suffer from sample bias, a lack of external validity, self-selection bias, and a multitude of other study design flaws resulting in a lack of causality. One study finds that students who are homeschooled and non related to a religious affiliation may score lower compared to those with religious affiliation. In a small sample survey, students who were homeschooled scored lower than peers on positive social characteristics, indicating less socialization.

=== Higher education enrollment ===
Homeschooled students may access higher education at the college or university level, some through dual enrollment while in high school and through standardized tests such as the College Level Examination Program (CLEP) and DANTES Subject Standard Tests (DSST).

US colleges and universities will admit homeschooled students who meet the institution's entry requirements. As of 2024, 75% of colleges and universities have an official policy for homeschool admissions and 95% have received applications from homeschoolers for admission. Documents that may be required for admission vary, but may include ACT/SAT scores, essays, high school transcript, letters of recommendation, SAT 2 scores, personal interviews, portfolio, and a GED.

=== Religious beliefs ===
Analysis conducted by sociologist Jeremy Uecker at the Christian college Baylor University, using qualitative methods on the National Study of Youth and Religion revealed that homeschooled young adults were no more religious than other young adults from the same demographic profile who attended public or private school. In addition, results from a survey administered by a Canadian Christian non-profit group, Cardus, in 2011 found that homeschooled young adults attended religious services with roughly the same frequency as their peers who attended a private, Protestant school, although homeschoolers attended church more often than their Catholic school peers. Milton Gaither, a professor of education at Messiah College believes that, "homeschooling itself will not automatically produce adults who share the conservative political, religious and moral beliefs of their parents."

== Legality ==
The legality of homeschooling in the United States has been debated by educators, lawmakers, and parents since the beginnings of compulsory schooling in Massachusetts in 1852. Since the late 1980s, the focus on the legality of homeschooling in general is less prevalent, with legal questions shifting to whether students who are homeschooled can access state school funds, facilities, and resources. There are also legal questions over the degree of control that a state can exercise on homeschooling families regarding areas like curricula and standardized testing.

=== Federal law ===
In the United States, homeschooling is lawful in all fifty states. The U.S. Supreme Court has never ruled on homeschooling specifically. In one of the more applicable cases to homeschooling, Wisconsin v. Yoder 406 U.S. 205 (1972), the court supported the rights of Amish parents to keep their children out of public schools for religious reasons.

In Meyer v. Nebraska, the Court ruled in favor of individual citizens by determining that the Siman Act – a state law to prevent the teaching of foreign language classes in public schools in Nebraska – was unconstitutional. In that decision, the court stated it was a fundamental right to "establish a home and bring up children" along with the right to "worship God according to the dictates of [their] own conscience." This precedent established the basis for the argument for fundamental rights within the concept of liberty, protected by the Due Process Clause. This legal basis forms the argument for the protection of homeschooling in the US today.

In a related case, Runyon v. McCrary, which determined racial discrimination in private schools was unconstitutional, the court's opinion cited Pierce v. Society of Sisters of the Holy Names of Jesus and Mary, 268 U.S. 510 (1925), determining that the state may set educational standards but may not limit how parents choose to meet those educational standards. Pierce v. Society of Sisters determined the state may not prohibit a parent from satisfying a compulsory attendance requirement by sending their children to private school.

Both cases upheld the precedent of the due process clause of the fourteenth amendment and also determined the state could not penalize parents for the failure to send their children to public school. Although this should not be confused with the state's ability to penalize parents who fail to meet the compulsory attendance of schooling requirement. Therefore, the court acknowledged that parents "may replace state educational requirements with their own idiosyncratic views of what knowledge a child needs to be a productive and happy member of society," but that the state is not able to impose a cost to parents.

In the 1988 case Murphy v. State of Arkansas, the court addressed the limitations of Pierce v. Society of Sisters, stating:

The Court has repeatedly stressed that while parents have a constitutional right to send their children to private schools and a constitutional right to select private schools that offer specialized instruction, they have no constitutional right to provide their children with private school education unfettered by reasonable government regulation...Indeed, the Court in Pierce expressly acknowledged "the power of the State reasonably to regulate all schools, to inspect, supervise and examine them, their teachers and pupils..."

The Court held that a state may not prohibit a parent from satisfying a compulsory attendance requirement by sending their children to private school, and many homeschooling advocates or cases with respect to homeschooling have cited this proposition, arguing that parents have a right to satisfy compulsory attendance requirements through home instruction. Parents' right to homeschool their children is not an explicitly protected right. Prior court decisions establish some legal argumentation against the prohibition of homeschooling.

Every US state has some form of a compulsory attendance law that requires children in a certain age range to spend a specific amount of time being educated.

=== State laws ===
Because the Supreme Court has largely left legislation of homeschooling largely up to individual states, each state varies widely regarding the level and type of regulation. Many states require parents to notify either local government or the state if they intend to home school; with many requiring annual notification. Two states, Rhode Island and Massachusetts, require parents to obtain approval prior to homeschooling from their local school district. And two states, Florida and Arizona, require notification to cease home schooling. Some states have assessment criteria, which involve either a standardized exam or annual review of a portfolio of work. For instance, in Florida, parents must send in an assessment of their child's work annually; in Oregon, children must take a standardized exam at the end of 3rd, 5th, 8th, and 10th grade.

Homeschooling laws can be divided into three categories:

1. Private school status: Homeschooling curricula are based on its treatment as a type of private school (e.g. California, Indiana, and Texas.) Homeschools are generally required to comply with the same laws that apply to other (usually non-accredited) schools.
2. Compulsory attendance: Homeschool requirements are based on the unique wording of the state's compulsory attendance statute without any specific reference to "homeschooling" (New Jersey and Maryland, for example). In those states, the requirements for homeschooling are set by the particular parameters of the compulsory attendance statute.
3. Explicit alternative education definition: In other states (Maine, New Hampshire, and Iowa) homeschool requirements are based on a statute or group of statutes that specifically applies to homeschooling, although statutes often refer to homeschooling using other nomenclature, such as home instruction, alternative instruction or competent private instruction. In these states, the requirements for homeschooling are set out in the relevant statutes.

Homeschooling notification
State	Notification requirement
AK	None
AL	One-time notice
AR	Annual notice
AZ	One-time notice
CA	Annual notice
CO	Annual notice
CT	None
DE	Annual notice
FL	One-time notice
GA	Annual notice
HI	One-time notice
IA	None
ID	None
IL	None
IN	None
KS	One-time notice
KY	Annual notice
LA	Annual notice
MA	One-time notice
MD	Annual notice
ME	One-time notice
MI	None
MN	Annual notice
MO	None
MS	Annual notice
MT	Annual notice
NC	One-time notice
ND	Annual notice
NE	Annual notice
NH	Annual notice
NJ	None
NM	Annual notice
NV	One-time notice
NY	Annual notice
OH	Annual notice
OK	None
OR	One-time notice
PA	Annual notice
RI	One-time notice
SC	Annual notice
SD	One-time notice
TN	Annual notice
TX	None
UT	One-time notice
VA	Annual notice
VT	Annual notice
WA	Annual notice
WI	Annual notice
WV	One-time notice
WY	None

==== Alabama ====
Alabama Code § 16–1–11.1 states that "the State of Alabama has no compelling interest to burden by license or regulation nonpublic schools, which include private, church, parochial, and religious schools offering educational instruction in grades K-12, as well as home-based schools and home-schooled students."

Homeschoolers in Alabama have the option to use a private or church school or to use a private tutor; however since 2014, parents have been recognized as being able to homeschool on their own, independently from a church or private cover, and without needing to meet the qualifications listed under the private tutor option. While homeschool is currently distinguished from private and religious schools in both § 16–1–11.1 and § 16–1–11.2, the Alabama State Department of Education (ALSDE) has further clarified that a cover school is not required.

As Alabama generally does not regulate homeschool, requirements are few. Children enrolled in an Alabama public school must be formally withdrawn, which can be done at any time. Parents should also notify the local school district of intent to homeschool to confirm that the student is enrolled and that the parent is in compliance with Alabama Code § 16–28–15; however, the ALSDE notes that neither they nor any other agency is authorized to verify that this has been done. Parents are required to keep attendance of their children. The ALSDE has stated that any such reporting requirements "tend to lend themselves to a brick and mortar facility rather than a home school environment." If using a church or private school, parents would also need to comply with any policies set for by that school, and private tutors would need to comply with any requirements set forth by state law and the ALSDE.

==== California ====
Today in California homeschoolers must either be part of a public homeschooling program through independent study or a charter school, use a credentialed tutor or enroll their children in a qualified private school. Such private schools may be formed by the parents in their own home, or parents may use a number of private schools that offer some kind of independent study or distance learning options. All persons who operate private schools in California, including parents forming schools just for their own children, must file an annual affidavit with the Department of Education. They must offer certain courses of study and must keep attendance records, but are otherwise not subject to any state oversight.

Today there is no requirement in California that any private school teachers, whether the school is large or small, must have state credentials, although all teachers must be capable of teaching. This current legal standing is a result of a case that began in February 2008, where the California Court of Appeals issued a ruling that made homeschooling without the use of teacher certification illegal in the state of California. The court's decision stated:

"It is clear that the education of the children at their home, whatever the quality of that education, does not qualify for the private full-time day school or credentialed tutor exemptions from compulsory education in a public full-time day school."

The court rejected the defendant's argument relying on the precedent in the federal case, Yoder, holding regarding religious choice. However, in March 2008, the court granted the petition for rehearing, and unanimously reversed itself, deciding that non-credentialed parents could homeschool their children under California law.

==== Florida ====
Florida's homeschool education law is codified primarily in Florida Statute § 1002.41 and related sections of the Florida Education Code. A home education program registered with a district school superintendent also satisfies Florida's compulsory attendance requirements for children ages six through sixteen.

Parents who choose to homeschool under § 1002.41 are not required to hold a teaching certificate or any formal educational qualification. The statute provides parents broad autonomy to select curriculum, instructional methods, and learning activities without state-mandated subjects, specific instructional hours, or minimum attendance days.

To comply with Florida homeschool law, a parent must file a written notice of intent within 30 days of the program to establish and maintain a home education program with the district school superintendent of the county where the family resides. Florida law further requires an annual demonstration of availability, with parents allowed to choose the method of evaluation. A copy of the evaluation must be filed with the district superintendent's office annually. When a home education program is terminated, the parent must file a written notice of termination with the district superintendent within 30 days of termination, often accompanied by the final annual evaluation. Homeschool students in Florida are eligible to participate in certain public programs.

==== Ohio ====
The law in Ohio that excuses students from compulsory attendance is the Ohio Administrative Code, Chapter 3301-34. Under this law, home education is defined as education that is directed by the parent or guardian of the child, favoring parental rights. Before the homeschooling process begins, the parent/guardian must notify the superintendent in his/her child's school district, normally through a district specific form, although notification by letter is normally accepted.

Information to the school district includes: the school year, name of parent, and address, child's birth date, parent signature guaranteeing that the subjects listed in the Ohio Administrative Code are part of homeschooling, outline of the curriculum that the parent plans to cover in the next year, a list of materials that the parent plans to use, parent signature guaranteeing that the child will be in home education for 900 hours during the upcoming school year, and finally assurance that the home instructor has a high school diploma or the equivalence of a high school diploma.

Parents must also send an academic assessment to the superintendent from the previous school year. The academic assessment report needs to be one of two things: either the results of a nationally normed, standardized test or a written portfolio. The superintendent reviews the student's performance through these self-declared materials.

==== Texas ====
The Texas Education Agency (TEA) has no authority to regulate homeschools and there is no legal mandate for the number of hours homeschooled children must attend. There is no requirement for state standardized testing. State law does not require registration or annual filings for non-public schools. State law does not require any teacher credentials, or proven capability for non-public schools, such that parents with accreditation may teach their own children. TEA considers homeschools to be equivalent to unaccredited private schools; TEA states that private schools are not required to be accredited, and therefore the state has no requirement to regulate them. State laws require private, unaccredited schools, including homeschools to the following:

- Teaching must include reading, spelling, grammar, mathematics and "good citizenship" (typically civics). The curriculum must be in visual form and must be taught in a bona fide manner, i.e. there is explicit intention to education. The curriculum may be obtained from any source desired, and does not require approval or submission, to any state or local authority, prior to use.
- State law requires notification, only if the child was previously in a public school and is withdrawn; the notification required is merely a letter notifying the school district of the parent(s)' intent, and only one letter is required at the initial decision to withdraw the child from public school.

Homeschool students may dual-enroll in public schools, but they are not required to do so. Texas is considered a "halfway state", meaning that homeschool students have the choice to participate in public school extracurricular activities under the University Interscholastic League guidelines.

==== Virginia ====
To teach children at home, the teaching parent must meet at least one of the following criteria:

1. Possess a valid high school diploma (or a higher degree, such as can be obtained through a university), which must be submitted to the district's superintendent—a GED does not fulfill this requirement.
2. Hold a valid teacher's certificate as approved by the state.
3. Provide a distance or correspondence curriculum approved by the superintendent of public instruction.
4. Provide evidence that they, as the teaching parent, can meet the Virginia Standards of Learning objectives.

The teaching parent must annually inform the district of their intent to instruct children at home and the child must meet vaccination requirements of students in public education. A homeschooled student may or may not be eligible to play sports for the school in their area, depending on the school.

Virginia also allows for religious exemptions to the above requirement. If parents present sufficient evidence that a child's family has religious backing that attending school is abhorrent to their faith, and fill out the proper forms, none of the above is required to instruct a child at home.

At the end of each year, the district must be provided with written documentation that the student has made academic progress in any form, such as a portfolio or transcript submitted by parent. If these are not available, the use of some form of nationally normed standardized achievement test is required. Homeschooled children do not receive a diploma for completion of homeschooling studies. Those who do correspondence curricula with a public institution will receive a diploma from the program. Normally to receive a diploma, one must complete a GED.

==== Washington ====
To start homeschooling parents must annually file a Declaration of Intent to Provide Home Based Instruction RCW 28A.200.010 and be state qualified to homeschool (RCW 28A.225.010). Under Washington state law RCW 28A.225.010, education is compulsory for children eight or older or if the child has been officially enrolled in public school. Washington does require (RCW 28A.225.010) that homeschools teach reading, writing, spelling, language, math, science, social studies, history, health, occupational education, art and music appreciation. Subjects can be taught at homeschooler's discretion, and must meet the requirements of an annual evaluation. Each year the student must be evaluated according to law RCW28A.200.010, in the form of:

- A standardized achievement test that has been approved by the State Board of Education, or
- a non-test assessment administered by a Washington state certified teacher who must be currently working in the field of education.

Both the tests and results are required to be kept per RCW 28A.200.010 but does not specify in what form they be kept. Records can be requested by a school administration if the parents later decide to enroll their children in formal schooling. The state requires immunization records in accordance with law, and requests that further records be kept on instructional and educational activities.

== Curricula and state resources ==
Curriculum requirements vary from state to state. While many complete curricula are available from a wide variety of secular and religious sources, many families choose to use a variety of resources to cover the required subjects.

Some states offer public-school-at-home programs. These online or virtual public schools may follow major aspects of the homeschooling paradigm, for example, instruction occurs outside of a traditional classroom, usually in the home. Some public-school-at-home programs give parents leeway in curriculum choice; others require use of a specified curriculum.

Full parental or student control over the curriculum and program is a large motivation for homeschooling. School-at-home programs are taxpayer-funded, covering the cost of providing books, supplies, and other needs, for public-school-at-home students just as conventional public school students. The U.S. Constitution's prohibition against establishing religion applies to public-school-at-home programs, so state appropriated funds cannot be used for purchasing religious materials.

A minority of states have statutes that require public schools to give homeschooled students access to district resources, such as school libraries, computer labs, extracurricular activities, or even academic courses. The laws of some states give districts the option of giving homeschooled students access to such resources.

Access to interscholastic athletic competition varies from state to state.

- Some state athletic associations, such as the Kentucky High School Athletic Association, completely ban homeschoolers from interscholastic competition; both by prohibiting homeschoolers to compete for a state federation member school as well as by prohibiting member schools to compete against independent teams made up of homeschoolers. In such states, homeschoolers may only compete amongst other homeschoolers or against schools that are not members of the state's interscholastic athletic federation.
- Still other state interscholastic athletic associations allow homeschoolers to organize teams that compete against other established schools, but do not allow homeschoolers to compete on established school teams. The Texas Association of Private and Parochial Schools, the largest of several governing bodies for non-public schools in Texas, uses this option, as does the Michigan High School Athletic Association, though the MHSAA allows such contests during regular season play only.

== Advocacy ==
There are several national homeschooling advocacy groups. These groups advocate for the rights of parents and families who wish to homeschool their children. These organization have grown increasingly powerful, particularly in local politics. These organizations include:

- Home School Legal Defense Association (HSLDA)
- Alliance for Intellectual Freedom in Education
- Center for Homeschool Liberty
- American Homeschool Association
- National Home Education Network
- Association of HomeSchool Attorneys
- National Home Education Legal Defence
- National Alliance of Secular Homeschoolers
- Texas Home School Coalition
- Schooling America

The CRHE (Coalition for Responsible Home Education) is an organization which advocates for increased legislative oversight for homeschooling to prevent educational neglect and child abuse by homeschooling families. The CRHE also conducts research and data analysis to provide better insight into homeschooling outcomes.

== See also ==
- Homeschooling software
