= FWPA =

FWPA may refer to:

- Federal Way Public Academy
- Federal Water Power Act
