= WSBE =

WSBE may refer to:

- Washington State Board of Education, in the state of Washington
- Whittemore School of Business and Economics, at the University of New Hampshire
- WPVD-TV, a television station in Providence, Rhode Island, that used the call sign WSBE-TV from 1967 to 2026
