= Truman High School =

Truman High School may refer to:

- Truman High School (Independence, Missouri)
- Harry S Truman High School (Levittown, Pennsylvania), Pennsylvania
- Harry S. Truman High School (Taylor, Michigan)
- Harry S. Truman High School (Bronx), New York
- Harry S. Truman High School (Federal Way), Washington

== See also ==
- Trumann High School, Trumann, Arkansas
