= 2016 Texas Rangers season =

2016 Texas Rangers
- American League West champions
- League: American League
- Division: West
- Ballpark: Globe Life Park in Arlington
- City: Arlington, Texas
- Record: 95–67 (.586)
- Divisional place: 1st
- Owners: Rangers Baseball Express (Ray Davis and Bob R. Simpson)
- Managers: Jeff Banister
- Television: Fox Sports Southwest (Steve Busby, Dave Raymond, Tom Grieve)
- Radio: KRLD 105.3 FM (English) (Eric Nadel, Matt Hicks, Dave Raymond, Jared Sandler); KZMP 1540 AM (Spanish) (Eleno Orlenas, Jerry Romo)
- Stats: ESPN.com; Baseball Reference

The 2016 Texas Rangers season was the Rangers' 56th season of the franchise in Major League Baseball (MLB), and the 45th since the team relocated to Arlington, Texas. The Rangers won the American League West title for the second straight season, with the best record in the American League. However, for the second straight year, they lost to the Toronto Blue Jays in the ALDS, this time in three games. The Rangers set an MLB record by going 36–11 in one-run games. Because of this stat, as well as the team winning 95 games instead of their projected 80 wins, baseball pundits viewed the Rangers as a "lucky" team. As of 2026, this was the last time the Rangers won the AL West division title.

== Regular season ==
=== Season standings ===
==== American League West ====
AL West
Team	W	L	Pct.	GB	Home	Road
Texas Rangers	95	67	.586	—	53‍–‍28	42‍–‍39
Seattle Mariners	86	76	.531	9	44‍–‍37	42‍–‍39
Houston Astros	84	78	.519	11	43‍–‍38	41‍–‍40
Los Angeles Angels	74	88	.457	21	40‍–‍41	34‍–‍47
Oakland Athletics	69	93	.426	26	34‍–‍47	35‍–‍46

==== American League division leaders and Wild Card ====
Division leaders
Team	W	L	Pct.
Texas Rangers	95	67	.586
Cleveland Indians	94	67	.584
Boston Red Sox	93	69	.574

Wild Card teams (Top 2 teams qualify for postseason)
Team	W	L	Pct.	GB
Toronto Blue Jays	89	73	.549	—
Baltimore Orioles	89	73	.549	—
Detroit Tigers	86	75	.534	2½
Seattle Mariners	86	76	.531	3
New York Yankees	84	78	.519	5
Houston Astros	84	78	.519	5
Kansas City Royals	81	81	.500	8
Chicago White Sox	78	84	.481	11
Los Angeles Angels	74	88	.457	15
Oakland Athletics	69	93	.426	20
Tampa Bay Rays	68	94	.420	21
Minnesota Twins	59	103	.364	30

==== Record against opponents ====
2016 American League record Source: MLB Standings Grid – 2016
Team	BAL	BOS	CWS	CLE	DET	HOU	KC	LAA	MIN	NYY	OAK	SEA	TB	TEX	TOR	NL
Baltimore	—	8–11	4–3	5–1	5–2	1–6	4–2	4–2	5–1	10–9	3–4	1–6	13–6	3–4	9–10	14–6
Boston	11–8	—	3–4	4–2	2–5	5–2	2–4	4–3	4–3	11–8	5–1	4–3	12–7	3–3	9–10	14–6
Chicago	3–4	4–3	—	8–11	7–12	3–3	5–14	2–5	12–7	3–3	5–2	4–3	4–3	4–2	5–1	9–11
Cleveland	1–5	2–4	11–8	—	14–4	3–4	14–5	6–1	10–9	2–5	4–2	3–4	5–1	2–5	4–3	13–7
Detroit	2–5	5–2	12–7	4–14	—	4–2	7–12	2–4	15–4	3–3	4–3	4–3	6–1	2–4	3–4	13–7
Houston	6–1	2–5	3–3	4–3	2–4	—	3–4	13–6	5–2	2–4	13–6	11–8	3–3	4–15	2–5	11–9
Kansas City	2–4	4–2	14–5	5–14	12–7	4–3	—	1–5	15–4	2–5	1–6	3–4	5–2	1–6	2–4	10–10
Los Angeles	2–4	3–4	5–2	1–6	4–2	6–13	5–1	—	2–4	1–6	12–7	8–11	3–4	9–10	4–3	9–11
Minnesota	1–5	3–4	7–12	9–10	4–15	2–5	4–15	4–2	—	2–5	2–4	4–2	3–4	5–2	1–6	8–12
New York	9–10	8–11	3–3	5–2	3–3	4–2	5–2	6–1	5–2	—	4–3	3–3	11–8	3–4	7–12	8–12
Oakland	4–3	1–5	2–5	2–4	3–4	6–13	6–1	7–12	4–2	3–4	—	7–12	5–2	9–10	3–3	7–13
Seattle	6–1	3–4	3–4	4–3	3–4	8–11	4–3	11–8	2–4	3–3	12–7	—	4–2	7–12	3–3	13–7
Tampa Bay	6–13	7–12	3–4	1–5	1–6	3–3	2–5	4–3	4–3	8–11	2–5	2–4	—	4–2	11–8	10–10
Texas	4–3	3–3	2–4	5–2	4–2	15–4	6–1	10–9	2–5	4–3	10–9	12–7	2–4	—	3–4	13–7
Toronto	10–9	10–9	1–5	3–4	4–3	5–2	4–2	3–4	6–1	12–7	3–3	3–3	8–11	4–3	—	13–7

=== Game log ===
2016 Game Log 95–67 (Home: 53–28; Away: 42–39)
April: 14–10 (Home: 10–4; Away: 4–6)

#	Date	Opponent	Score	Win	Loss	Save	Attendance	Record	Streak
1	April 4	Mariners	3–2	Hamels (1–0)	Hernández (0–1)	Tolleson (1)	49,289	1–0	W1
2	April 5	Mariners	2–10	Vincent (1–0)	Barnette (0–1)	—	28,386	1–1	L1
3	April 6	Mariners	5–9	Benoit (1–0)	Tolleson (0–1)	—	26,945	1–2	L2
4	April 7	@ Angels	3–4	Street (1–0)	Dyson (0–1)	—	39,089	1–3	L3
5	April 8	@ Angels	7–3	Griffin (1–0)	Shoemaker (0–1)	—	35,207	2–3	W1
6	April 9	@ Angels	4–1	Hamels (2–0)	Richards (0–2)	Tolleson (2)	38,106	3–3	W2
7	April 10	@ Angels	1–3	J. Weaver (1–0)	M. Pérez (0–1)	H. Street (1)	35,097	3–4	L1
8	April 11	@ Mariners	7–3	C. Lewis (1–0)	H. Iwakuma (0–1)	—	13,468	4–4	W1
9	April 12	@ Mariners	8–0	D. Holland (1–0)	W. Miley (0–1)	—	13,376	5–4	W2
10	April 13	@ Mariners	2–4 (10)	S. Cishek (1–0)	J. Diekman (0–1)	—	15,075	5–5	L1
11	April 14	Orioles	6–3	T. Wilhelmsen (1–0)	C. Tillman (1-1)	S. Tolleson (3)	22,820	6–5	W1
12	April 15	Orioles	5–11	V. Worley (1–0)	T. Wilhelmsen (1-1)	—	32,628	6–6	L1
13	April 16	Orioles	8–4	K. Kela (1–0)	T. J. McFarland (0–1)	—	39,493	7–6	W1
–	April 17	Orioles	Postponed (rain). Makeup date: June 20th.						
14	April 19	Astros	7–5	D. Holland (2–0)	S. Feldman (0–2)	S. Tolleson (4)	24,181	8–6	W2
15	April 20	Astros	2–1	C. Hamels (3–0)	D. Fister (1–2)	S. Tolleson (5)	25,821	9–6	W3
16	April 21	Astros	7–4	A.J. Griffin (2–0)	D. Keuchel (2-2)	S. Tolleson (6)	25,886	10–6	W4
17	April 22	@ White Sox	0–5	J. Quintana (2–1)	M. Pérez (0–2)	—	15,486	10–7	L1
18	April 23	@ White Sox	3–4 (11)	M. Albers (1–0)	N. Martinez (0–1)	—	20,182	10–8	L2
19	April 24	@ White Sox	1–4	M. Latos (4–0)	D. Holland (2–1)	D. Robertson (7)	26,058	10–9	L3
20	April 25	Yankees	1–3	N. Eovaldi (1–2)	C. Ramos (0–1)	A. Miller (5)	31,453	10–10	L4
21	April 26	Yankees	10-1	A.J. Griffin (3–0)	L. Severino (0–3)	—	26,163	11–10	W1
22	April 27	Yankees	3–2	M. Pérez (1–2)	CC Sabathia (1–2)	S. Tolleson (7)	35,477	12–10	W2
23	April 29	Angels	4–2	C. Lewis (2–0)	H. Santiago (2–1)	S. Tolleson (8)	29,589	13–10	W3
24	April 30	Angels	7–2	D. Holland (3–1)	M. Shoemaker (1–4)	—	41,571	14–10	W4

May: 17–11 (Home: 8–5; Away: 9–6)

#	Date	Opponent	Score	Win	Loss	Save	Attendance	Record	Streak
25	May 1	Angels	6–9	G. Mahle (1–0)	T. Wilhelmsen (1–2)	—	39,401	14–11	L1
26	May 2	@ Blue Jays	2–1	T. Barnette (1-1)	G. Floyd (0–2)	S. Tolleson (9)	25,323	15–11	W1
27	May 3	@ Blue Jays	1–3 (10)	J. Biagini (1-1)	P. Klein (0–1)	—	24,437	15–12	L1
28	May 4	@ Blue Jays	3–4	R. Osuna (1–0)	T. Barnette (1–2)	—	25,229	15–13	L2
29	May 5	@ Blue Jays	2–12	J. A. Happ (4–0)	D. Holland (3–2)	—	35,468	15–14	L3
30	May 6	@ Tigers	5–1	C. Hamels (4–0)	J. Zimmermann (5–1)	—	28,522	16–14	W1
31	May 7	@ Tigers	10–5	A. Ranaudo (1–0)	K. Ryan (0–1)	S. Tolleson (10)	35,551	17–14	W2
32	May 8	@ Tigers	8–3	T. Wilhelmsen (2-2)	M. Lowe (1-1)	—	35,406	18–14	W3
33	May 9	White Sox	4–8 (12)	D. Jennings (1–0)	C. Ramos (0–2)	—	22,958	18–15	L1
34	May 10	White Sox	13–11	A. Claudio (1–0)	M. Albers (1-1)	S. Tolleson (11)	25,804	19–15	W1
35	May 11	White Sox	6–5	T. Barnette (2-2)	D. Jennings (1-1)	S. Dyson (1)	29,023	20–15	W2
36	May 13	Blue Jays	0–5	R. A. Dickey (2–4)	M. Pérez (1–3)	—	40,344	20–16	L1
37	May 14	Blue Jays	6–5 (10)	T. Barnette (3–2)	G. Floyd (1–3)	—	47,115	21–16	W1
38	May 15	Blue Jays	7-6	M. Bush (1–0)	J. Chavez (0–1)	S. Dyson (2)	41,327	22–16	W2
39	May 16	@ Athletics	1–3	S. Manaea (1-1)	D. Holland (3-3)	R. Madson (11)	10,068	22–17	L1
40	May 17	@ Athletics	5–8	R. Madson (2–0)	S. Tolleson (0–2)	—	12,718	22–18	L2
41	May 18	@ Athletics	1–8	R. Hill (6–3)	M. Pérez (1–4)	—	14,323	22–19	L3
42	May 20	@ Astros	2–1	C. Lewis (3–0)	L. McCullers (0–1)	S. Dyson (3)	28,724	23–19	W1
43	May 21	@ Astros	2–1	C. Ramos (1–2)	M. Fiers (3–2)	S. Dyson (4)	25,886	24–19	W2
44	May 22	@ Astros	9–2	C. Hamels (5–0)	D. Keuchel (2–6)	—	35,035	25–19	W3
45	May 23	Angels	0–2	N. Tropeano (3–2)	D. Holland (3–4)	J. Smith (6)	25,298	25–20	L1
46	May 24	Angels	4–1	M. Pérez (2–4)	J. Chacín (1–3)	S. Dyson (5)	26,125	26–20	W1
47	May 25	Angels	15–9	C. Lewis (4–0)	H. Santiago (3-3)	—	32,480	27–20	W2
48	May 27	Pirates	1–9	J. Niese (5–2)	C. Hamels (5–1)	—	37,645	27–21	L1
49	May 28	Pirates	5–2	Y. Darvish (1–0)	J. Nicasio (4-4)	—	46,950	28–21	W1
50	May 29	Pirates	6–2	M. Pérez (3–4)	F. Liriano (4-4)	—	44,613	29–21	W2
51	May 30	@ Indians	9–2	D. Holland (4-4)	J. Tomlin (7–1)	C. Ramos (1)	14,514	30–21	W3
52	May 31	@ Indians	7–3	C. Lewis (5–0)	C. Kluber (4–6)	S. Dyson (6)	10,428	31–21	W4

June: 20–8 (Home: 10–3; Away: 10–5)

#	Date	Opponent	Score	Win	Loss	Save	Attendance	Record	Streak
53	June 1	@ Indians	4–5 (11)	T. Gorzelanny (1–0)	A. Claudio (1-1)	—	10,524	31–22	L1
54	June 3	Mariners	7–3	Y. Darvish (2–0)	T. Walker (2–6)	—	32,395	32–22	W1
55	June 4	Mariners	10–4	M. Pérez (4-4)	N. Karns (5–2)	—	34,317	33–22	W2
56	June 5	Mariners	3–2	D. Holland (5–4)	H. Iwakuma (4–5)	S. Dyson (7)	37,616	34–22	W3
57	June 6	Astros	6–5	S. Dyson (1-1)	K. Giles (0–3)	—	30,021	35–22	W4
58	June 7	Astros	4–3	J. Diekman (1-1)	D. Keuchel (3–8)	S. Dyson (8)	32,189	36–22	W5
59	June 8	Astros	1–3	D. Fister (6–3)	T. Wilhelmsen (2–3)	W. Harris (2)	37,696	36–23	L1
60	June 9	Astros	5–3	M. Pérez (5–4)	C. McHugh (5-5)	J. Diekman (1)	30,145	37–23	W1
61	June 10	@ Mariners	5–7	H. Iwakuma (5-5)	D. Holland (5-5)	S. Cishek (14)	37,055	37–24	L1
62	June 11	@ Mariners	2–1 (11)	M. Bush (2–0)	M. Montgomery (2–1)	S. Dyson (9)	36,055	38–24	W1
63	June 12	@ Mariners	6–4	C. Hamels (6–1)	W. Miley (6–3)	S. Dyson (10)	39,251	39–24	W2
64	June 13	@ Athletics	5–14	D. Coulombe (1–0)	C. Ramos (1–3)	Z. Neal (1)	13,453	39–25	L1
65	June 14	@ Athletics	10–6	M. Pérez (6–4)	E. Surkamp (0–4)	—	13,101	40–25	W1
66	June 15	@ Athletics	7–5	N. Martinez (1-1)	J. Axford (3–2)	S. Dyson (11)	10,115	41–25	W2
67	June 16	@ Athletics	5–1	C. Lewis (6–0)	D. Mengden (0–2)	—	14,236	42–25	W3
68	June 17	@ Cardinals	1–0	C. Hamels (7–1)	M. Wacha (2–7)	S. Dyson (12)	44,064	43–25	W4
69	June 18	@ Cardinals	4–3	S. Tolleson (1–2)	T. Rosenthal (2-2)	J. Diekman (2)	44,375	44–25	W5
70	June 19	@ Cardinals	5–4	T. Barnette (4–2)	M. Bowman (1–2)	S. Dyson (13)	44,897	45–25	W6
71	June 20	Orioles	4–3	S. Tolleson (2-2)	K. Gausman (0–5)	S. Dyson (14)	35,366	46–25	W7
72	June 21	Reds	2–8	A. DeSclafani (1–0)	C. Lewis (6–1)	—	32,291	46–26	L1
73	June 22	Reds	6–4	C. Hamels (8–1)	D. Straily (4-4)	S. Dyson (15)	32,407	47–26	W1
74	June 24	Red Sox	7–8	H. Hembree (4–0)	M. Bush (2–1)	K. Uehara (2)	46,811	47–27	L1
75	June 25	Red Sox	10–3	C. Ramos (2–3)	S. Wright (8–5)	—	47,559	48–27	W1
76	June 26	Red Sox	6–2	M. Pérez (7–4)	C. Buchholz (3–8)	—	36,312	49–27	W2
77	June 27	@ Yankees	9–6	T. Barnette (5–2)	K. Yates (2–1)	S. Dyson (16)	32,914	50–27	W3
78	June 28	@ Yankees	7–1	C. Hamels (9–1)	CC Sabathia (5-5)	—	32,373	51–27	W4
79	June 29	@ Yankees	7–9	L. Cessa (1–0)	S. Dyson (1–2)	—	39,875	51–28	L1
80	June 30	@ Yankees	1–2	A. Chapman (2–0)	T. Barnette (5–3)	—	39,934	51–29	L2

July: 11–15 (Home: 6–5; Away: 5–10)

#	Date	Opponent	Score	Win	Loss	Save	Attendance	Record	Streak
81	July 1	@ Twins	3–2 (10)	M. Bush (3–1)	F. Abad (1–3)	S. Dyson (17)	25,530	52–29	W1
82	July 2	@ Twins	5–17	T. Duffey (4–6)	C. Gonzalez (0–1)	—	21,466	52–30	L1
83	July 3	@ Twins	4–5	K. Gibson (2–5)	C. Hamels (9–2)	B. Kintzler (4)	26,942	52–31	L2
84	July 4	@ Red Sox	5–12	R. Porcello (10–2)	N. Martinez (1–2)	—	36,253	52–32	L3
85	July 5	@ Red Sox	7–2	C. Ramos (3–3)	D. Price (8–6)	—	35,964	53–32	W1
86	July 6	@ Red Sox	6–11	S. Wright (10–5)	M. Pérez (7–5)	—	37,175	53–33	L1
87	July 7	Twins	1–10	T. Duffey (5–6)	C. Gonzalez (0–2)	—	43,934	53–34	L2
88	July 8	Twins	6–5	T. Barnette (6–3)	R. Pressly (2–5)	S. Dyson (18)	40,330	54–34	W1
89	July 9	Twins	6–8	R. Nolasco (4–7)	K. Lohse (0–1)	B. Kintzler (5)	37,708	54–35	L1
90	July 10	Twins	5–15	T. Milone (2–2)	A.J. Griffin (3–1)	—	31,978	54–36	L2
87th All-Star Game in San Diego, California
91	July 15	@ Cubs	0–6	K. Hendricks (8–6)	M. Pérez (7–6)	—	41,482	54–37	L3
92	July 16	@ Cubs	1–3	J. Hammel (8–5)	Y. Darvish (2–1)	H. Rondon (15)	41,346	54–38	L4
93	July 17	@ Cubs	4–1	C. Hamels (10–2)	J. Lackey (7–6)	S. Dyson (19)	41,213	55–38	W1
94	July 18	@ Angels	5-9	J. C. Ramirez (2–3)	K. Kela (1–1)	—	36,020	55–39	L1
95	July 19	@ Angels	6–8	T. Lincecum (2–3)	K. Lohse (0–2)	H. Street (8)	36,368	55–40	L2
96	July 20	@ Angels	4–7	H. Santiago (8–4)	M. Pérez (7–7)	—	37,095	55–41	L3
97	July 22	@ Royals	1–3	D. Duffy (6–1)	Y. Darvish (2–2)	W. Davis (21)	33,535	55–42	L4
98	July 23	@ Royals	7–4	C. Hamels (11–2)	Y. Ventura (6–8)	—	32,132	56–42	W1
99	July 24	@ Royals	2–1	A. Claudio (2–1)	L. Hochevar (2–3)	S. Dyson (20)	32,739	57–42	W2
100	July 25	Athletics	7–6	J. Diekman (2–1)	R. Madson (3–4)	—	27,292	58–42	W3
101	July 26	Athletics	3–6	S. Gray (5–9)	N. Martinez (1–3)	—	25,272	58–43	L1
102	July 27	Athletics	4–6	R. Dull (5–2)	M. Bush (3–2)	R. Madson (22)	29,630	58–44	L2
103	July 28	Royals	3–2	C. Hamels (12–2)	Y. Ventura (6–9)	S. Dyson (21)	36,008	59–44	W1
104	July 29	Royals	8–3	A.J. Griffin (4–1)	E. Volquez (8–9)	—	40,008	60–44	W2
105	July 30	Royals	2–1	M. Bush (4–2)	B. Pounders (1–1)	—	47,125	61–44	W3
106	July 31	Royals	5–3	L. Harrell (3–2)	D. Gee (3–5)	S. Dyson (22)	32,806	62–44	W4

August: 18–10 (Home: 11–4; Away: 7–6)

#	Date	Opponent	Score	Win	Loss	Save	Attendance	Record	Streak
107	August 2	@ Orioles	1–5	D. Bundy (4–3)	Y. Darvish (2–3)	D. O'Day (3)	22,230	62–45	L1
108	August 3	@ Orioles	2–3	K. Gausman (3–8)	C. Hamels (12–3)	Z. Britton (33)	24,552	62–46	L2
109	August 4	@ Orioles	5–3	A.J. Griffin (5–1)	W. Miley (7–9)	S. Dyson (23)	28,762	63–46	W1
110	August 5	@ Astros	0–5	D. Keuchel (7–11)	M. Pérez (7–8)	—	32,820	63–47	L1
111	August 6	@ Astros	3–2	K. Kela (2–1)	C. Devenski (0–3)	S. Dyson (24)	42,272	64–47	W1
112	August 7	@ Astros	5–3 (11)	M. Bush (5–2)	C. Devenski (0–4)	—	33,909	65–47	W2
113	August 8	@ Rockies	4–3	K. Kela (3–1)	C. Estevez (2–7)	J. Diekman (3)	31,768	66–47	W3
114	August 9	@ Rockies	7–5	A. Claudio (3–1)	S. Oberg (0–1)	S. Dyson (25)	27,671	67–47	W4
115	August 10	Rockies	5–4	J. Diekman (3–1)	B. Logan (1–2)	M. Bush (1)	29,866	68–47	W5
116	August 11	Rockies	9–12	S. Oberg (1–1)	J. Diekman (3–2)	A. Ottavino (1)	20,720	68–48	L1
117	August 12	Tigers	8–5	Y. Darvish (3–3)	A. Sanchez (6–12)	S. Dyson (26)	31,190	69–48	W1
118	August 13	Tigers	0–2	M. Boyd (4–2)	C. Hamels (12–4)	F. Rodríguez (33)	37,792	69–49	L1
119	August 14	Tigers	0–7	M. Fulmer (10–3)	A.J. Griffin (5–2)	—	35,458	69–50	L2
120	August 15	Athletics	5–2	M. Pérez (8–8)	R. Detwiler (1–1)	S. Dyson (27)	22,845	70–50	W1
121	August 16	Athletics	5–4 (10)	K. Kela (4–1)	J. Axford (4–4)	—	21,877	71–50	W2
122	August 17	Athletics	6–2	Y. Darvish (4–3)	S. Manaea (4–8)	—	26,743	72–50	W3
123	August 19	@ Rays	6–2	C. Hamels (13–4)	M. Andriese (6–5)	—	15,109	73–50	W4
124	August 20	@ Rays	2–8	J. Odorizzi (8–5)	A.J. Griffin (5–3)	—	16,505	73–51	L1
125	August 21	@ Rays	4–8	D. Smyly (6–11)	M. Pérez (8–9)	—	17,685	73–52	L2
126	August 23	@ Reds	0–3	D. Straily (10–6)	D. Holland (5–6)	T. Cingrani (16)	16,668	73–53	L3
127	August 24	@ Reds	6–5	J. Diekman (4–2)	B. Wood (5–2)	S. Dyson (28)	16,100	74–53	W1
128	August 25	Indians	9–0	C. Hamels (14–4)	J. Tomlin (11–8)	—	23,768	75–53	W2
129	August 26	Indians	1–12	C. Kluber (14–8)	M. Pérez (8–10)	—	31,853	75–54	L1
130	August 27	Indians	7–0	A.J. Griffin (6–3)	C. Carrasco (9–7)	—	44,944	76–54	W1
131	August 28	Indians	2–1	D. Holland (6–6)	D. Salazar (11–6)	S. Dyson (29)	35,225	77–54	W2
132	August 29	Mariners	6–3	Y. Darvish (5–3)	H. Iwakuma (14–10)	S. Dyson (30)	22,972	78–54	W3
133	August 30	Mariners	8–7	M. Bush (6–2)	E. Díaz (0–3)	—	26,950	79–54	W4
134	August 31	Mariners	14–1	M. Pérez (9–10)	F. Hernandez (9–5)	—	21,309	80–54	W5

September: 15–11 (Home: 8–5; Away: 7–6)

#	Date	Opponent	Score	Win	Loss	Save	Attendance	Record	Streak
135	September 2	Astros	10–8	A.J. Griffin (7–3)	D. Fister (12–10)	S. Dyson (31)	35,102	81–54	W6
136	September 3	Astros	12–4	D. Holland (7–6)	J. Musgrove (2–3)	—	35,538	82–54	W7
137	September 4	Astros	6–7	C. Devenski (3–4)	Y. Darvish (5–4)	K. Giles (8)	46,025	82–55	L1
138	September 5	@ Mariners	6–14	F. Hernández (10–5)	C. Hamels (14–5)	—	23,618	82–56	L2
139	September 6	@ Mariners	10–7	M. Pérez (10–10)	J. Paxton (4–6)	S. Dyson (32)	14,615	83–56	W1
140	September 7	@ Mariners	3–8	A. Miranda (3–1)	A.J. Griffin (7–4)	—	15,434	83–57	L1
141	September 8	@ Mariners	3–6	T. Walker (5–10)	D. Holland (7–7)	E. Díaz (13)	17,493	83–58	L2
142	September 9	@ Angels	2–1	M. Bush (7–2)	J. Ramirez (1–1)	S. Dyson (33)	42,137	84–58	W1
143	September 10	@ Angels	8–5	T. Scheppers (1–0)	J. Valdez (1–2)	S. Dyson (34)	39,146	85–58	W2
144	September 11	@ Angels	2–3	J. Weaver (11–11)	C. Lewis (6–2)	Bailey (3)	35,052	85–59	L1
145	September 12	@ Astros	4–3 (12)	K. Kela (5–1)	J. Hoyt (1–1)	J. Diekman (4)	22,147	86–59	W1
146	September 13	@ Astros	3–2	A. Claudio (4–1)	K. Giles (2–4)	T. Scheppers (1)	22,133	87–59	W2
147	September 14	@ Astros	4–8	J. Musgrove (3–4)	D. Holland (7–8)	—	25,041	87–60	L1
148	September 16	Athletics	7–6	S. Dyson (2–2)	R. Madson (5–6)	—	30,486	88–60	W1
149	September 17	Athletics	2–11	R. Alcántara (1–1)	Y. Darvish (5–5)	—	39,691	88–61	L1
150	September 18	Athletics	2–5	R. Detwiler (2–3)	C. Lewis (6–3)	R. Dull (3)	34,224	88–62	L2
151	September 19	Angels	3–2	S. Dyson (3–2)	J. Álvarez (1–3)	—	29,068	89–62	W1
152	September 20	Angels	5–4	N. Martinez (2–3)	D. Wright (0–4)	S. Dyson (35)	26,520	90–62	W2
153	September 21	Angels	4–5	J. Weaver (12-12)	D. Holland (7–9)	A. Bailey (4)	35,609	90–63	L1
154	September 23	@ Athletics	3–0	C. Hamels (15–5)	K. Graveman (10–11)	S. Dyson (36)	26,367	91–63	W1
155	September 24	@ Athletics	5–0	Y. Darvish (6–5)	R. Alcántara (1–2)	—	16,736	92–63	W2
156	September 25	@ Athletics	1–7	J. Cotton (2–0)	C. Lewis (6–4)	—	17,048	92–64	L1
157	September 26	Brewers	3–8	M. Garza (6–8)	M. Perez (10–11)	—	27,263	92–65	L2
158	September 27	Brewers	6–4	T. Barnette (7–3)	J. Nelson (8–16)	S. Dyson (37)	29,668	93–65	W1
159	September 28	Brewers	8–5	J. Jeffress (1–0)	C. Knebel (1–4)	—	36,619	94–65	W2
160	September 30	Rays	3–1	Y. Darvish (7–5)	M. Andriese (8–8)	S. Dyson (38)	35,968	95–65	W3

October: 0–2 (Home: 0–2; Away: 0–0 )

#	Date	Opponent	Score	Win	Loss	Save	Attendance	Record	Streak
161	October 1	Rays	1–4	J. Odorizzi (10–6)	C. Lewis (6–5)	A. Colomé (37)	42,093	95–66	L1
162	October 2	Rays	4–6 (10)	A. Colomé (2–4)	T. Scheppers (1–1)	—	37,015	95–67	L2

== Player stats ==
=== Batting ===
Note: G = Games played; AB = At bats; R = Runs; H = Hits; 2B = Doubles; 3B = Triples; HR = Home runs; RBI = Runs batted in; SB = Stolen bases; BB = Walks; AVG = Batting average; SLG = Slugging average

Player	G	AB	R	H	2B	3B	HR	RBI	SB	BB	AVG	SLG
Ian Desmond	156	625	107	178	29	3	22	86	21	44	.285	.446
Rougned Odor	150	605	89	164	33	4	33	88	14	19	.271	.502
Adrián Beltré	153	583	89	175	31	1	32	104	1	48	.300	.521
Nomar Mazara	145	516	59	137	13	3	20	64	0	39	.266	.419
Elvis Andrus	147	506	75	153	31	7	8	69	24	47	.302	.439
Mitch Moreland	147	460	49	107	21	0	22	60	1	35	.233	.422
Prince Fielder	89	326	29	69	16	0	8	44	0	32	.212	.334
Jurickson Profar	90	272	35	65	6	3	5	20	2	30	.239	.338
Ryan Rua	99	240	40	62	8	1	8	22	9	21	.258	.400
Carlos Beltrán	52	193	23	54	12	0	7	29	1	13	.280	.451
Delino DeShields Jr.	74	182	36	38	7	0	4	13	8	15	.209	.313
Shin-Soo Choo	48	178	27	43	7	0	7	17	6	25	.242	.399
Jonathan Lucroy	47	152	19	42	7	0	11	31	0	14	.276	.539
Robinson Chirinos	57	147	21	33	11	0	9	20	0	15	.224	.483
Bobby Wilson	42	128	11	32	4	0	3	22	0	5	.250	.352
Carlos Gómez	33	116	18	33	6	0	8	24	5	13	.284	.543
Bryan Holaday	29	84	14	20	6	1	2	13	0	5	.238	.405
Hanser Alberto	35	56	2	8	1	0	0	5	1	0	.143	.161
Jared Hoying	38	46	8	10	2	0	0	5	1	3	.217	.261
Brett Nicholas	15	40	5	11	5	0	2	4	0	4	.275	.550
Joey Gallo	17	25	2	1	0	0	1	1	1	5	.040	.160
Drew Stubbs	19	20	6	6	0	0	2	3	4	4	.300	.600
Justin Ruggiano	1	4	0	1	1	0	0	1	0	0	.250	.500
Pitcher totals	162	21	1	4	0	0	1	1	0	0	.190	.333
Team totals	162	5525	765	1446	257	23	215	746	99	436	.262	.433

=== Pitching ===
Note: W = Wins; L = Losses; ERA = Earned run average; G = Games pitched; GS = Games started; SV = Saves; IP = Innings pitched; H = Hits allowed; R = Runs allowed; ER = Earned runs allowed; BB = Walks allowed; SO = Strikeouts

Player	W	L	ERA	G	GS	SV	IP	H	R	ER	BB	SO
Cole Hamels	15	5	3.32	32	32	0	200.2	185	83	74	77	200
Martín Pérez	10	11	4.39	33	33	0	198.2	205	110	97	76	103
A.J. Griffin	7	4	5.07	23	23	0	119.0	116	68	67	46	107
Colby Lewis	6	5	3.71	19	19	0	116.1	103	53	48	28	73
Derek Holland	7	9	4.95	22	20	0	107.1	116	62	59	35	67
Yu Darvish	7	5	3.41	17	17	0	100.1	81	43	38	31	132
Sam Dyson	3	2	2.43	73	0	38	70.1	63	19	19	23	55
Matt Bush	7	2	2.48	58	0	1	61.2	44	18	17	14	61
Tony Barnette	7	3	2.09	53	0	0	60.1	54	16	14	16	49
Jake Diekman	4	2	3.40	66	0	4	53.0	36	22	20	26	59
Alex Claudio	4	1	2.79	39	0	0	51.2	55	19	16	10	34
Cesar Ramos	3	3	6.04	16	4	1	47.2	60	34	32	20	27
Nick Martinez	2	3	5.59	12	5	0	38.2	45	24	24	19	16
Shawn Tolleson	2	2	7.68	37	0	11	36.1	53	32	31	10	29
Keone Kela	5	1	6.09	35	0	0	34.0	30	23	23	17	45
Tom Wilhelmsen	2	3	10.55	21	0	0	21.1	38	25	25	9	11
Lucas Harrell	1	0	5.60	4	4	0	17.2	21	11	11	13	15
Jose Leclerc	0	0	1.80	12	0	0	15.0	11	4	3	13	15
Jeremy Jeffress	1	0	2.70	12	0	0	13.1	10	4	4	7	7
Luke Jackson	0	0	10.80	8	0	0	11.2	22	14	14	8	3
Dario Álvarez	0	0	7.71	10	0	0	11.2	17	11	10	2	13
Chi Chi Gonzalez	0	2	8.71	3	3	0	10.1	21	13	10	9	7
Kyle Lohse	0	2	12.54	2	2	0	9.1	15	13	13	5	3
Tanner Scheppers	1	1	4.15	10	0	1	8.2	6	4	4	3	5
Phil Klein	0	1	5.19	8	0	0	8.2	8	5	5	2	12
Andrew Faulkner	0	0	6.75	9	0	0	6.2	8	7	5	4	1
Anthony Ranaudo	1	0	17.18	2	0	0	3.2	2	7	7	8	2
Michael Roth	0	0	14.73	1	0	0	3.2	10	6	6	1	3
Yohander Méndez	0	0	18.00	2	0	0	3.0	5	6	6	2	0
Bryan Holaday	0	0	0.00	1	0	0	1.1	0	0	0	0	0
Jared Hoying	0	0	9.00	1	0	0	1.0	1	1	1	0	0
Team totals	95	67	4.37	162	162	56	1443.0	1441	757	700	534	1154

== Postseason ==
=== Game log ===
2016 Postseason Game Log: 0–3
AL Division Series: 0–3

#	Date	Opponent	Score	Win	Loss	Save	Attendance	Series
1	October 6	Blue Jays	1–10	Estrada (1–0)	Hamels (0–1)	—	47,434	0–1
2	October 7	Blue Jays	3–5	Happ (1–0)	Darvish (0–1)	Osuna (1)	48,019	0–2
3	October 9	@ Blue Jays	6–7 (10)	Osuna (1–0)	Bush (0–1)	—	49,555	0–3

=== Postseason rosters ===
Playoff rosters
American League Division Series

- Pitchers: 11 Yu Darvish 23 Jeremy Jeffress 33 Martín Pérez 35 Cole Hamels 41 Jake Diekman 43 Tony Barnette 47 Sam Dyson 48 Colby Lewis 50 Keone Kela 51 Matt Bush 58 Alex Claudio
- Catchers: 25 Jonathan Lucroy 61 Robinson Chirinos
- Infielders: 1 Elvis Andrus 12 Rougned Odor 18 Mitch Moreland 19 Jurickson Profar 29 Adrián Beltré
- Outfielders: 14 Carlos Gómez 16 Ryan Rua 17 Shin-Soo Choo 20 Ian Desmond 30 Nomar Mazara 31 Jared Hoying
- Designated hitters: 36 Carlos Beltrán

== Roster ==
2016 Texas Rangers
Roster
Pitchers: 39 Darío Álvarez; 43 Tony Barnette; 51 Matt Bush; 58 Alex Claudio; 11 Yu Darvish; 41 Jake Diekman; 47 Sam Dyson; 56 Andrew Faulkner; 21 Chi Chi Gonzalez; 64 A. J. Griffin; 35 Cole Hamels; 38 Lucas Harrell; 45 Derek Holland; 77 Luke Jackson; 23 Jeremy Jeffress; 50 Keone Kela; 31 Phil Klein; 62 José Leclerc; 48 Colby Lewis; 49 Kyle Lohse; 22 Nick Martinez; 65 Yohander Méndez; 33 Martín Pérez; 55 Cesar Ramos; 53 Anthony Ranaudo; 53 Michael Roth; 52 Tanner Scheppers; 37 Shawn Tolleson; 54 Tom Wilhelmsen	Catchers: 61 Robinson Chirinos; 8 Bryan Holaday; 25 Jonathan Lucroy; 63 Brett Nicholas; 6 Bobby Wilson; Infielders: 2 Hanser Alberto; 1 Elvis Andrus; 29 Adrián Beltré; 84 Prince Fielder; 13 Joey Gallo; 18 Mitch Moreland; 12 Rougned Odor; 19 Jurickson Profar	Outfielders: 36 Carlos Beltrán; 17 Shin-Soo Choo; 3 Delino DeShields; 20 Ian Desmond; 14 Carlos Gómez; 31,36 Jared Hoying; 30 Nomar Mazara; 16 Ryan Rua; 25 Justin Ruggiano; 15 Drew Stubbs	Manager: 28 Jeff Banister; Coaches: 27 Tony Beasley (third base); 46 Doug Brocail (pitching); 24 Steve Buechele (bench); 66 Josh Frasier (bullpen catcher); 40 Brad Holman (bullpen); 9 Anthony Iapoce (hitting); 5 Bobby Jones (replay); 0 Justin Mashore (assistant hitting); 4 Héctor Ortiz (first base); 44 Spike Owen (interim third base); 60 Jayce Tingler (field)

== Farm system ==
Level	Team	League	Manager
AAA	Round Rock Express	Pacific Coast League	Jason Wood
AA	Frisco RoughRiders	Texas League	Joe Mikulik
A-Advanced	High Desert Mavericks	California League	Howard Johnson
A	Hickory Crawdads	South Atlantic League	Spike Owen
A-Short Season	Spokane Indians	Northwest League	Tim Hulett
Rookie	AZL Rangers	Arizona League	Matt Siegel
Rookie	DSL Rangers 1	Dominican Summer League	
Rookie	DSL Rangers 2	Dominican Summer League	

LEAGUE CHAMPIONS: High Desert

== Blue Jays–Rangers brawl ==
During the May 15, 2016, game against the Toronto Blue Jays, there were two benches-clearing incidents. Following a contentious meeting in the ALDS the previous season, many people thought the Rangers would target Jose Bautista for his controversial bat flip in the ALDS. However, the first six games of the season between the clubs were played without incident. Finally, in the last regular season game between the clubs, Rangers reliever Matt Bush hit Bautista in the ribs with a fastball. On the ensuing play, Bautista slid hard into Rangers second baseman Rougned Odor. Odor, taking exception, pushed Bautista, then proceeded to punch Bautista squarely in the face. This fight caused both benches and bullpens to clear. Bautista, Odor, Steve Buechele, and Josh Donaldson were ejected after the brawl. Later in the game, Blue Jays pitcher Jesse Chavez hit Prince Fielder with a pitch causing the benches to clear again, although this time no punches were thrown. Chavez and DeMarlo Hale were ejected following this incident. Odor would serve a seven-game suspension for his actions. Toronto manager John Gibbons and Chavez would serve three games suspensions while Bautista and Elvis Andrus served one game suspensions.
