= Jason Stiles =

American football player (born 1973)

Profile
- Position: Quarterback

Personal information
- Born: June 28, 1973 (age 53)
- Listed height: 6 ft 3 in (1.91 m)
- Listed weight: 210 lb (95 kg)

Career information
- High school: Decatur (Federal Way, Washington)
- College: Western Washington
- NFL draft: 1996: undrafted

Career history
- Wolfsburg Blue Wings (1996); Portland Forest Dragons (1997–1998)

Career AFL statistics
- Comp. / Att.: 42 / 96
- Passing yards: 628
- TD–INT: 10–5
- QB rating: 70.14
- Stats at ArenaFan.com

Jason Stiles (born June 28, 1973) is an American former professional football quarterback who played two seasons with the Portland Forest Dragons of the Arena Football League. He played college football at Western Washington University. Stiles was also a member of the Wolfsburg Blue Wings.

== Early life ==
Stiles first played high school football at Santa Margarita Catholic High School in Rancho Santa Margarita, California. He was the state's leading passer in 1990. He recorded 22 touchdowns on 3,200 passing yards in two years for the Eagles. Stiles earned all-league honors twice and was team captain for two years. He also lettered two years in baseball and basketball. He spent his last two years of high school playing at Decatur High School in Federal Way, Washington, graduating in 1991.

== College career ==
Stiles played college football for the Western Washington Vikings from 1992 to 1995. He recorded career totals of 7,854 passing yards, 1,052 pass attempts, 585 pass completions and 67 touchdown passes. He earned all-Columbia Football Association honors in 1995 and was an NAIA All-America selection. Stiles was also named little all-Northwest three times. He also the Vikings to two appearances in the NAIA playoffs. In 1992, Stiles threw a pass to wide receiver Chris Moore against the University of Puget Sound which would later garner an ESPY for Moore for Greatest College Play at the inaugural ESPY awards show.

== Professional career ==
Stiles played in ten games for the Wolfsburg Blue Wings in Germany during the 1996 season, helping the team to an 8–2 record. He also served as offensive coordinator.

Stiles played for the Portland Forest Dragons from 1997 to 1998, recording ten touchdown passes on 628 yards. He missed the 1999 season due to an injury.

== Broadcasting career ==
In 2006, Stiles began working as an analyst for Root Sports Northwest. He has covered college football, arena football and high school football. He also spent nine years as a color commentator on Western Washington Vikings football radio broadcasts.
