= Internet Academy =

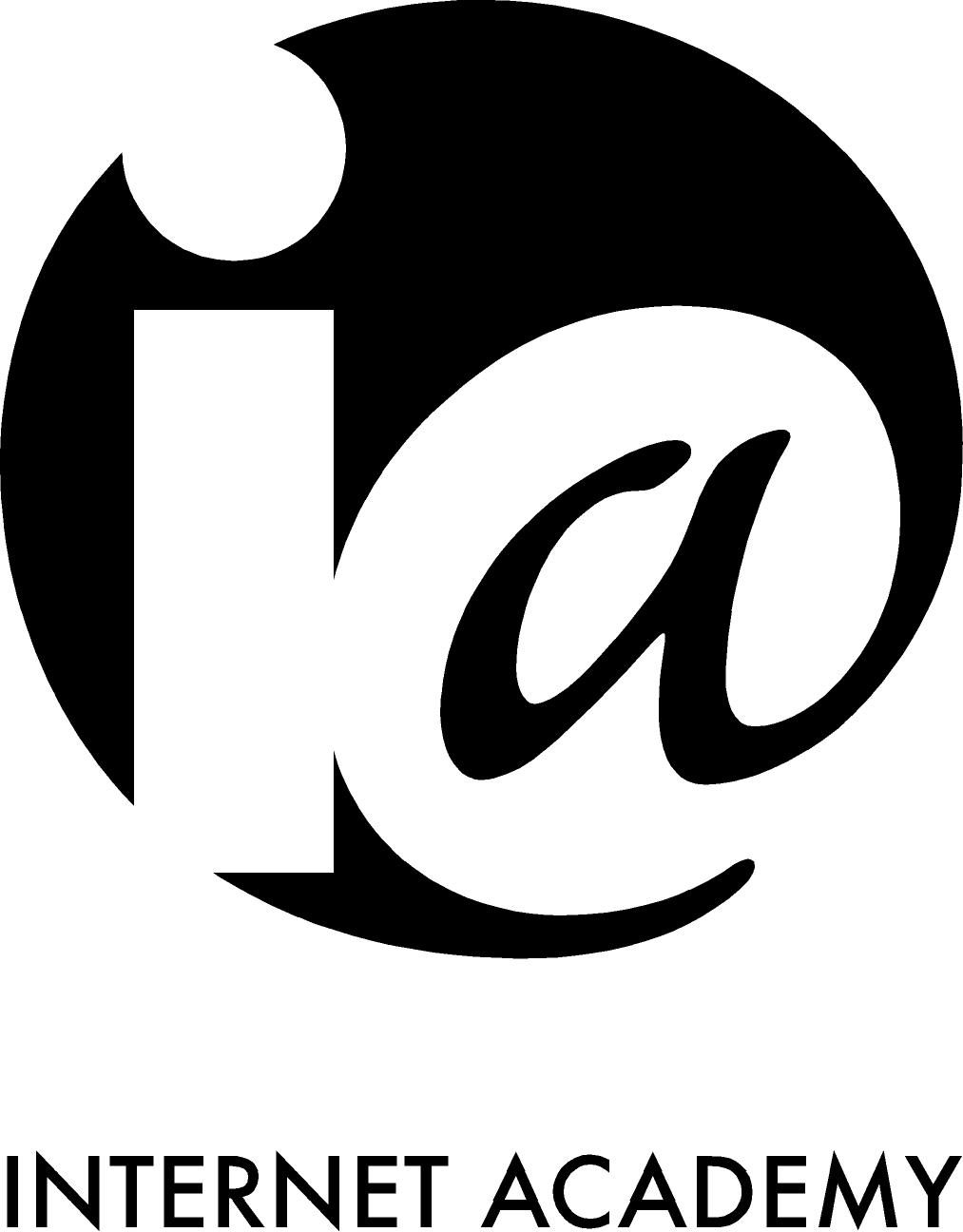

Location
- 31455 28th Ave S Federal Way, Washington 98003; United States; 47.318755°N 122.298976°W

Information
- School type: Public, Virtual school
- Established: 1996
- Founder: Tom Vander Ark
- Status: Open
- School district: Federal Way Public Schools
- Grades: K-12
- Enrollment: 271 (2016)
- Student to teacher ratio: 17.6
- Colors: Blue and Gold
- Nickname: IA
- Website: iacademy.fwps.org

The Internet Academy (IA or iAcademy) is a public virtual school, a part of Federal Way Public Schools, approved by the Northwest Accreditation Commission for grades K–12. Internet Academy was founded in 1996 and was the first online school in Washington state. Accredited diplomas, online tutors, teacher-to-student web conferencing and online tutorial videos are also provided.

There are two primary websites for Internet Academy. The main website, which was redesigned in September 2010, provides information on the institution, including a course catalog and contact information. The support site is where students and parents log in to access courses and contact teachers within a specific course.

== Education process and support ==
Internet Academy provides educational content over the Internet as a virtual school. Any student residing in Washington may choose to enroll in the school free of charge. Those out of state, may also enroll for a per-course fee. After a registration and orientation process, the student is granted access to the online courses.

Students meet Washington State standards by performing course work. Internet Academy provides courses throughout the entire year including during summer. Students can work from any Internet-connected computer.

Washington State Certified teachers manage materials and create their own lessons which are posted on the school site for students to complete. Teachers also hold live video chats where teachers and students may collaborate on an interactive whiteboard and communicate via headphones and/or a webcam.

== Parental involvement ==
Internet Academy provides parents of enrolled students with a Mentor/Insight Account. These accounts are separate from the students', and they allow the parent to view data, such as how long said student has been logged in, how many assignments that student has completed, and teacher feedback on assignments and tests. The Mentor/Insight Accounts are also supported by a library of video tutorials.

== Location and funding ==
Internet Academy parent and student interaction is primarily online, however, a support staff is available during business hours at the location in Federal Way, Washington off of Interstate 5. The offices are located within the same building of Harry S. Truman High School.

Internet Academy is state funded which means that K–12 students who live in Washington state may take up to five classes, free of tuition. Courses offered include Veterinary Medicine, French, Gothic Literature, Forensic Science, Photography, Music, and Art.
