= Decatur High School (Federal Way, Washington) =

Location
- 2800 SW 320th St; Federal Way, Washington 98023; United States
- 47°19′02″N 122°22′04″W

Information
- Type: Public secondary
- Established: 1971; 55 years ago
- School district: Federal Way Public Schools
- NCES School ID: 530282000434
- Principal: Jamie Tough
- Teaching staff: 64.52 (on an FTE basis)
- Grades: 9–12
- Enrollment: 1,352 (2024–2025)
- Student to teacher ratio: 20.95
- Campus: Suburban
- Colors: Navy Blue; Gold; Orange
- Mascot: Golden Gator
- Website: fwps.org/decatur

Decatur High School is an American secondary school teaching grades nine through twelve. A part of the Federal Way Public Schools, it was founded in 1971 in Federal Way, Washington.The graduating classes of 1973-1976 were schooled in the Illahee Middle School building. The school was built in 1976, renovated in 1987, then again remodeled in 2002.

Although sometimes assumed to have been named after Commodore Stephen Decatur, a War of 1812 and the First Barbary War and the Second Barbary War naval hero, the school is in fact named after the USS Decatur, a ship named for Stephen Decatur that assisted settlers during the 1856 Battle of Seattle.

Decatur was originally built as an "open concept" high school, where students were encouraged to study at their own pace in an open environment. Within the framework of this concept, there were few permanent walls built in the school's original structure. However, this experimental approach was scrapped after the 1976-77 school year when it was discovered that not all high school students were self-motivated enough to meet the district's education standards.

== Athletics ==
Decatur is part of the Olympic Division of the 4A North Puget Sound League in Washington's West Central District. From 2008-09 to 2015-16, Decatur was part of the South Division of the 3A South Puget Sound League. Recent team finishes in State Championships include:

- 1st in '01 and '02 in boys' soccer, at one point the team was ranked 7th('01) and 2nd('02) in the entire nation. 1989 3rd in state boys' soccer.
- Dance/ Drill Team 2014 State Champions, 2015 Contest of Champions National Champions, 2015 4A double State Champions 2013 USA NATIONAL CHAMPIONS (Kick, Small Military, and Medium Military),2012 USA NATIONAL CHAMPIONS (kick),1st in '13 (Military),2nd in '07, '11, and '12 (military), 3rd in '06 and '09 (military), 4th in '05, '08, '10(military), and 1st in '10 (POM), 2nd in '13 (Pom), 2nd in '11(kick) and 3rd in '11(pom), 1st in '12,'13 (kick) for the Dance/Drill Team
- 5th in State Girls' Basketball
- 1st in 2003 and '05, 3rd in '04, 4th in '02, and 7th in '01 and '06 for Boys' Swim and Dive
- 2nd in '04, 3rd in '05, and 4th in '00 for Boys' Tennis
- 2nd in 1996 for Boys' Basketball
- 3rd in '00 for Girls' Tennis
- 1st in '10 for Girls' Tennis
- 3rd in '04 for Girls' Track and Field
- 4th in '05, 5th in '00, and 7th in '06 for Girls' Swim and Dive
- 1st in '04,‘11 and 2nd in '17 for Cheerleading
- Semi Finals in '08 for Boys' Basketball lost to Federal Way High School

Other sports are Football, Baseball, Basketball, Cross Country, Gymnastics, Fastpitch Softball, Volleyball, Soccer, Wrestling and Golf.

Decatur's main rivals are the Federal Way Eagles, Thomas Jefferson Raiders, and Todd Beamer Titans

== Notable alumni ==
- Roberto Bergersen, former professional basketball player
- Rich Cho, basketball executive
- Benson Henderson, professional Mixed Martial Artist, former WEC and UFC Lightweight Champion
- Ciaran O'Brien, professional soccer player
- Janson Junk, professional baseball player
- Dustin Nickerson, stand-up comedian
- Apolo Ohno, 8 time Olympic medalist
- Bill Radke, host of Seattle's KUOW-FM's The Record and Week In Review
- Jason Stiles, American football player
- John McMullen, national talk show host and program director at Sirius Satellite Radio
- Iam Tongi, Winner of Season 21 of American Idol, singer and songwriter
