= Harry S. Truman High School (Federal Way) =

High school in Washington, U.S.

Location
- 31455 28th Avenue; Federal Way, WA 98003; Phone: (253) 945-5800; 47.3192°N 122.299°W

Information
- Type: Public
- Established: 1996
- School district: Federal Way Public Schools
- Principal: Ron Mayberry
- Enrollment: 175 (2012); 302 (Internet Academy 2012)
- Mascot Colors: Bulldog; Hunter green & white
- Website: http://schools.fwps.org/truman/
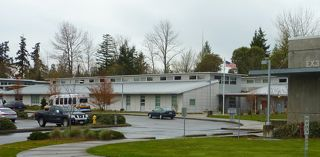

Harry S. Truman High School is a high school located in Federal Way, Washington, United States. It's part of the Federal Way Public Schools District.

== Truman features ==
- Modified school calendar
- Ability to take online courses through the Internet Academy
- Family involvement
- Individual learning plan
- Authentic project assessments
- Rigorous academic standards
- College prep and planning
- Building and celebrating a diverse community
- Respect for multiculturalism
- Parent involvement in student work
- Support for parents
- Level 1 (freshman and sophomores) & Level 2 (juniors and seniors)

Truman High School has three academies:

- Career Academy
- International Academy
- The Internet Academy – operating since 1996, the oldest online school in Washington State

== Facilities ==
The 23,300 SF building was designed for two semi-independent schools that accommodate 100 students each within an adaptable shell. Large multi-purpose areas exist for social interaction. Individual student workstations facilitate personalized activities and project-based learning. The school was designed to serve at-risk students, often one step from dropping out of school, through supporting small learning communities which reinforces personal connections within an open environment. Photos of the facility can be viewed at the architect's website.

The design was recognized as a finalist for the 2003 CEFPI James D. MacConnell Award for Excellence in School Design.

The school shares a campus with the Federal Way Head Start facility, the Truman Garden, and the EX3 Ron Sandwith Teen Center (Boys and Girls Clubs of King County).
