= Tony Barnette =

American baseball player (born 1983)

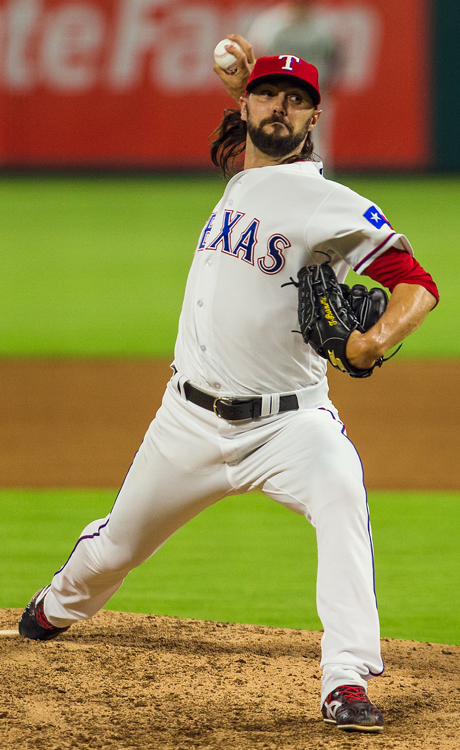
- Barnette for the Texas Rangers in 2016
- Pitcher
- Born: November 9, 1983 (age 42); Anchorage, Alaska, U.S.
- Batted: Right Threw: Right

Professional debut
- NPB: April 2, 2010, for the Tokyo Yakult Swallows
- MLB: April 5, 2016, for the Texas Rangers

Last appearance
- NPB: October 3, 2015, for the Tokyo Yakult Swallows
- MLB: June 26, 2019, for the Chicago Cubs

NPB statistics
- Win–loss record: 11–19
- Earned run average: 3.58
- Strikeouts: 336

MLB statistics
- Win–loss record: 11–4
- Earned run average: 3.53
- Strikeouts: 132
- Stats at Baseball Reference

Teams
- Tokyo Yakult Swallows (2010–2015); Texas Rangers (2016–2018); Chicago Cubs (2019)

Anthony Lee Barnette (born November 9, 1983) is an American former professional baseball pitcher. He played in Major League Baseball (MLB) for the Texas Rangers and Chicago Cubs and in Nippon Professional Baseball (NPB) for the Tokyo Yakult Swallows.

As of the end of the 2025 season, Barnette is the most recent MLB player born in Alaska.

== Career ==
Barnette is from Federal Way, Washington and attended Thomas Jefferson High School. He attended Arizona State University, where he pitched for the Sun Devils, after spending two years at Central Arizona College in Coolidge, Arizona.

=== Arizona Diamondbacks ===
Barnette was drafted by the Arizona Diamondbacks in the 10th round of the 2006 Major League Baseball draft. The two sides agreed to a deal on June 8, 2006. He played in the Diamondbacks' organization through 2009. In exchange for a fee of $200,000, the Diamondbacks released Barnette on January 5, 2010, so that he could sign with Nippon Professional Baseball's Yakult Swallows.

=== Tokyo Yakult Swallows ===
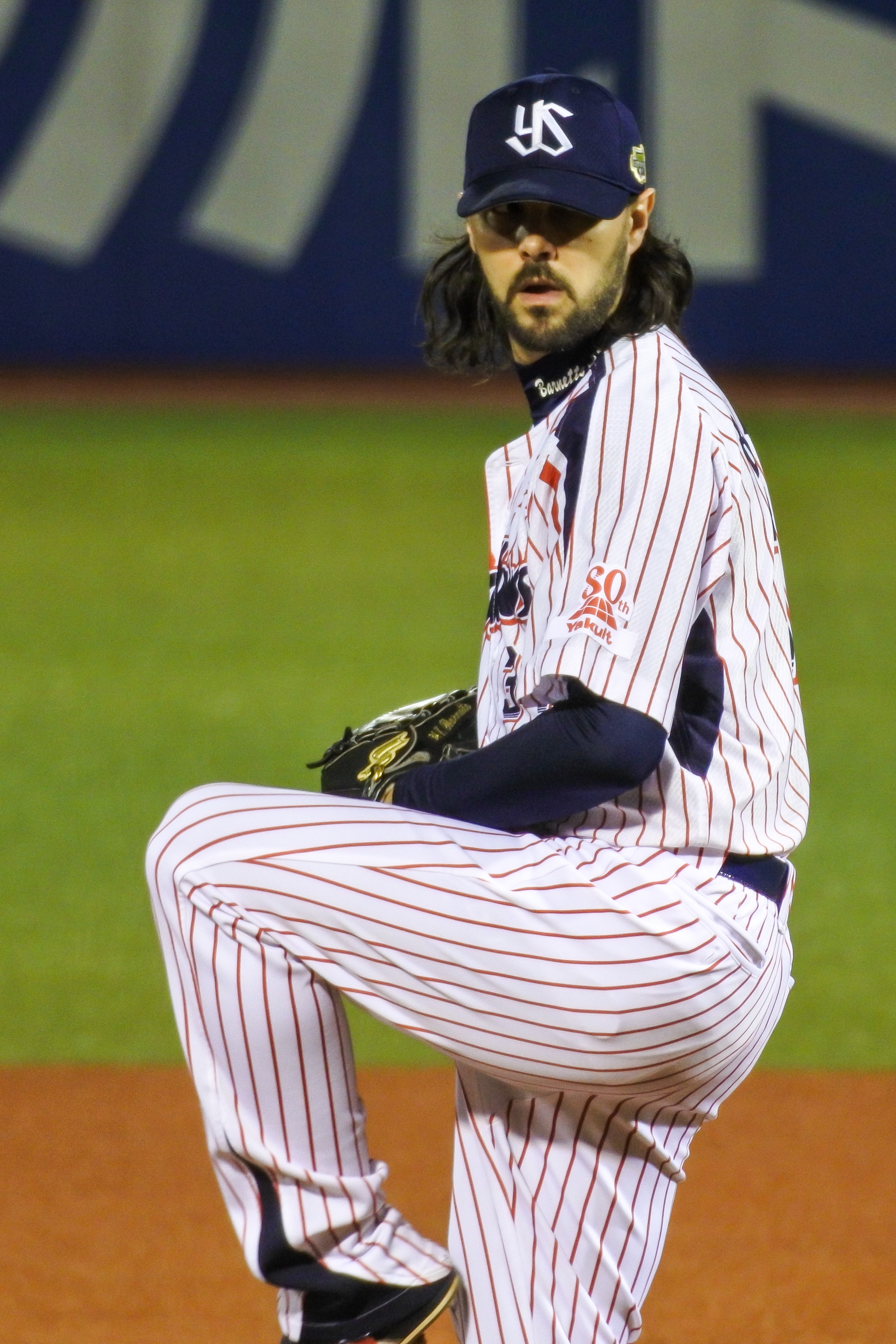
Barnette pitching for the Tokyo Yakult Swallows in 2015 Japan Series

Barnette signed with the Yakult Swallows just ahead of the 2010 season.

At the conclusion of the 2015 NPB season, his sixth with the Yakult Swallows, Barnette had appeared in 260 career games as a relief pitcher, compiling an 11–19 record and 97 saves with a 3.58 ERA and a 1.26 WHIP. His 2015 season, in which the Swallows won the Central League, was his most successful by several measures. On September 24, he broke the Swallows single-season record for saves, 37, that had been jointly held by his pitching coach at the time, Shingo Takatsu (2001), as well as Ryota Igarashi (2004) and Hirotoshi Ishii (2005). Barnette went on to tie for first in the Central League in saves (41) and recorded the lowest ERA among closers (1.29, a career best). He allowed just one home run in 62.2 innings and set a career-low WHIP of 0.89. Barnette's 2015 earned him third place in the Central League's MVP voting.

=== Texas Rangers ===
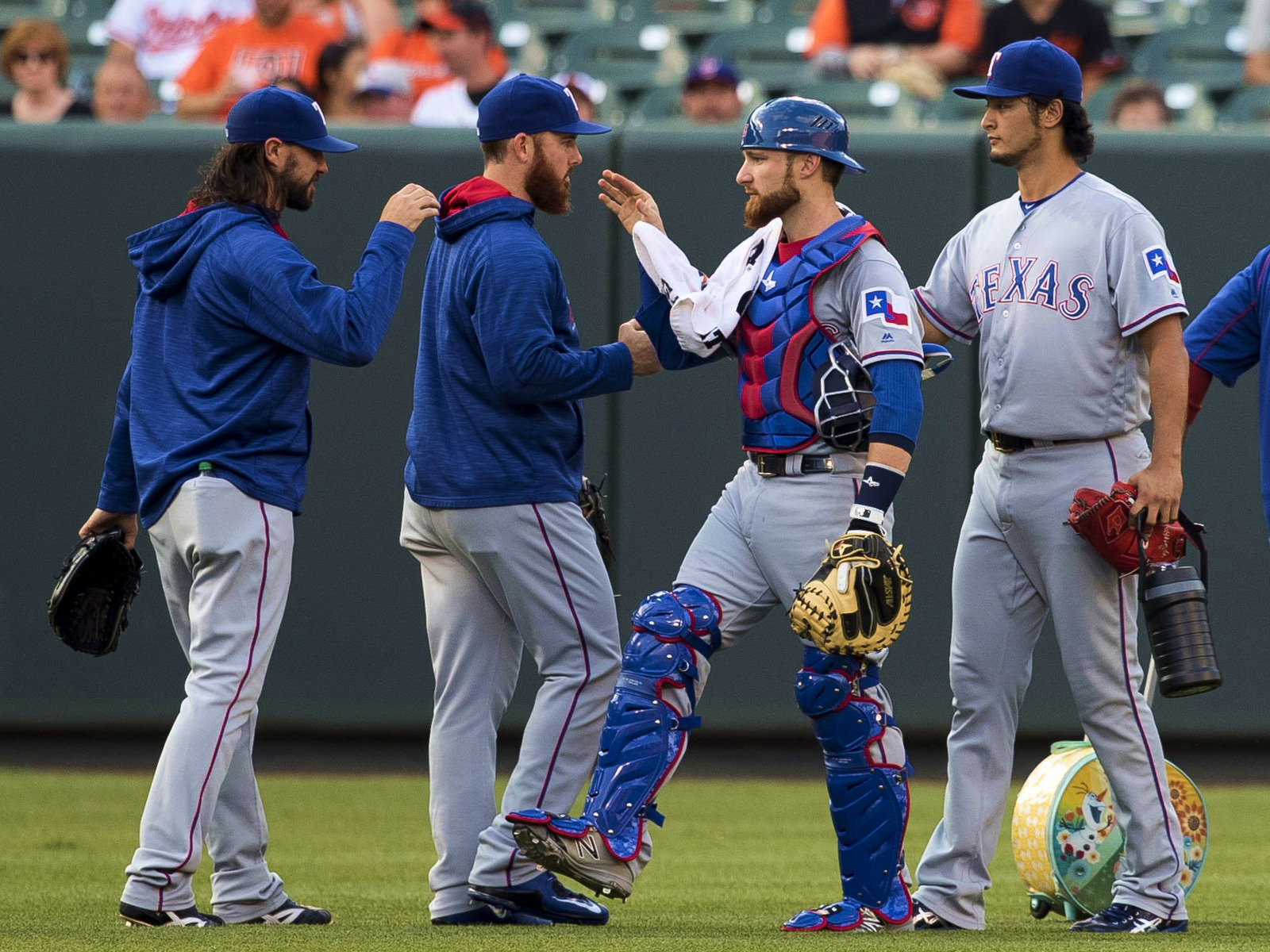
Barnette (far left) with (from left) Sam Dyson, Jonathan Lucroy and Yu Darvish in 2016

Barnette signed a two-year deal with the Texas Rangers of Major League Baseball on December 15, 2015. He made his major league debut at 32 years old against the Seattle Mariners on April 5, 2016. He allowed two runs on 3 hits while getting his first career MLB strikeout in two-thirds of an inning pitched. He finished the season with an ERA of 2.09, appearing in 53 games. Barnette’s 2.09 ERA was incredibly deceiving as he set the MLB record for allowing inherited runners to score which did not impact his ERA. He recorded 7 wins and 3 losses in 60 1/3 innings. The following season, his ERA fell to 5.49 in 50 1/3 innings. The Rangers declined Barnette's 2018 option on November 6, 2017, making him a free agent. He was re-signed by the team days later. On July 4, 2018, he was placed on the disabled list. Barnette became a free agent following the conclusion of the season.

=== Chicago Cubs ===
On February 1, 2019, Barnette signed a one-year major league contract with the Chicago Cubs. He opened the 2019 season on the injured list while dealing with right shoulder tightness. He rehabbed with the Iowa Cubs before being activated off the disabled list on June 23. On June 27, 2019, he was optioned down from the MLB Chicago Cubs to the Triple-A Iowa Cubs for Craig Kimbrel.

Barnette announced his retirement on January 28, 2020. Barnette is currently in baseball operations and pro scouting for the Tokyo Yakult Swallows.

=== In Media ===
On June 18, 2024, a book centered around Barnette's six years in Japan in pursuit of his major league dream, "A Baseball Gaijin: Chasing a Dream to Japan and Back," was released. Written by Aaron Fischman and authorized by Barnette himself, legendary agent Don Nomura penned the foreword, the book currently sits in the library of the National Baseball Hall of Fame and Museum and it was named a finalist for the prestigious Casey Award that honors the best baseball book each year. The nonfiction narrative concludes with an in-depth look at Barnette's rookie season at 32, in which he shared a bullpen with fellow thirty-something rookie Matt Bush and the Rangers posted the AL's best record. The Blue Jays went on to sweep the Rangers in the opening round, eliminating them for a second straight year, though Barnette's rookie season went down as an unmitigated success. By going to Japan without any prior major league experience and ultimately earning a major league deal before stringing together multiple strong MLB seasons, he'd usher in a new era of pitchers following a similar formula, with the San Diego Padres' All-Star closer, Robert Suarez, as the most prominent example.
