= Bryan Pittman =

American football player (born 1977)

No. 48
- Position: Long snapper

Personal information
- Born: January 20, 1977 (age 49); Tacoma, Washington, U.S.
- Listed height: 6 ft 3 in (1.91 m)
- Listed weight: 265 lb (120 kg)

Career information
- High school: Thomas Jefferson (Auburn, Washington)
- College: Washington
- NFL draft: 1999: undrafted

Career history
- Puget Sound Jets (2001–2002); Cleveland Browns (2003)*; Houston Texans (2003–2008); Seattle Seahawks (2009)*; Atlanta Falcons (2009); Houston Texans (2009)
- * Offseason or practice squad member only

Career NFL statistics
- Games played: 99
- Total tackles: 15
- Fumble recoveries: 1
- Stats at Pro Football Reference

Bryan S. Pittman (born January 20, 1977) is an American former professional football player who was a long snapper in the National Football League (NFL). He was signed by the Texans as an undrafted free agent in 2003. He played college football for the Washington Huskies.

Pittman played semi professionally for the Puget Sound Jets of the North West Football League for three seasons before breaking into the National Football League (NFL) in 2003 with the Cleveland Browns.

Pittman has been a member of the Seattle Seahawks, Atlanta Falcons and Houston Texans.

== Early life ==
Pittman attended Thomas Jefferson High School in Auburn, Washington. He was a three-year letterman in Football and Track for the Raiders.

Pittman was discovered and seen at well-known specialist coach Paul Assad's free agent camp in Reno, Nevada by Jerry Rosburg, special teams coach of the Cleveland Browns. His 15 yard punt snaps were clocked at 0.55 seconds, the fastest to date by a long snapper at an official combine event. Normal times are between 0.68 and 0.70 seconds. Cleveland had drafted a long snapper so after the last cuts of pre-season, Pittman was picked up by the Houston Texans by coach Joe Marciano who had seen Pittman at Paul Assad's event. He went on to play for seven years in the NFL.

== College career ==
Pittman attended Walla Walla Community College. In football, he was the team's long snapper and also started for two years at tight end. He then transferred to the University of Washington.
