= Thomas Jefferson High School (Auburn, Washington) =

Coordinates: 47.3446°N 122.2795°W

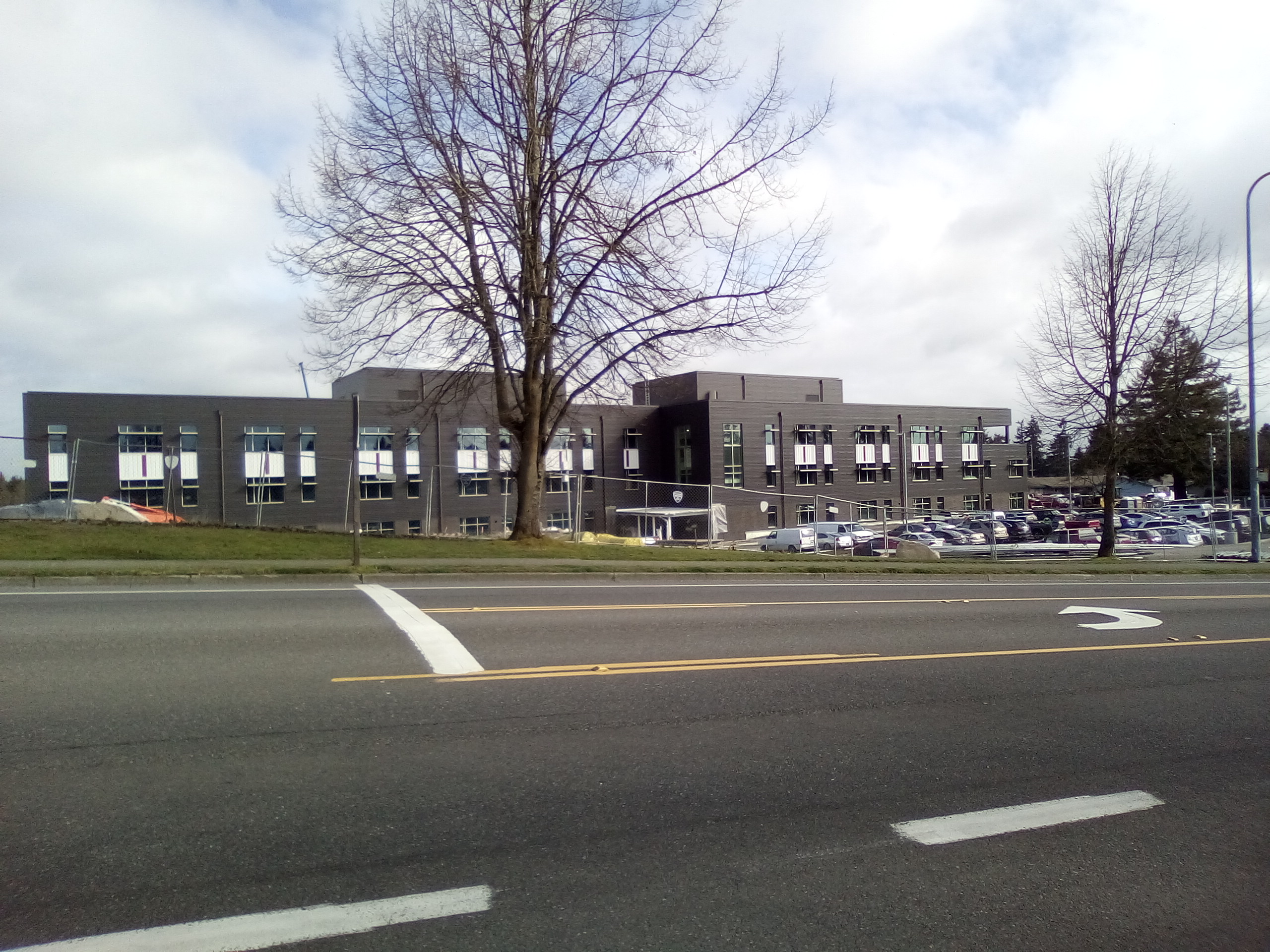
- Thomas Jefferson High School

Location
- 4248 S 288th St; Auburn, Washington 98001; United States

Information
- Type: High school
- Motto: E pluribus unum
- Established: 1968
- School district: Federal Way School District
- Principal: Joseph (Joe) Rush
- Teaching staff: 81.50 (FTE)
- Grades: 9–12
- Enrollment: 1,786 (2023–2024 school year)
- Student to teacher ratio: 21.91
- Colors: Red and gold
- Mascot: Raider
- Website: tjhs.fwps.org

Thomas Jefferson High School (usually abbreviated as TJ or TJHS) is a public high school located in Auburn, Washington, United States. It is the largest enrolled high school in the Federal Way School District and one of the largest in the State of Washington. The school is a member of the Coalition of Essential Schools, an organization whose guiding principles are intended to bolster student achievement. The mascot of Thomas Jefferson is the Raiders. A rebuilding of the school started in winter 2020; the new campus opened in the fall of 2021.

== Programs ==
=== International Baccalaureate (IB) ===
Since 1997 the school has offered the International Baccalaureate Program. The program can be a full-diploma choice or an option for earning certificates in specific subjects. The assessments are sent to external assessors, assuring that student work conforms to program standards. Thomas Jefferson High School also offers an honor program called MYP (Middle Years Program) which is a program that prepares students for the International Baccalaureate program.

=== Robotics Club ===
Thomas Jefferson's FIRST FRC Team 4469, Raider Artificial Intelligence Division (RAID for short), is an extracurricular club that aims to engage students with interests in science, technology, engineering, and mathematics (STEM) through hands-on projects and collaborative activities. The team fosters a supportive environment intended to build community and provide enriching experiences for its members.

=== CAPP ===
The Construction Apprenticeship Preparation Program (CAPP) is an integrated 4-year program for students interested in careers and apprenticeships in the construction industry. Construction, Language Arts and Math instructors team to take students through the four-year curriculum. College credit is available to enrolled students.

=== Emergency Response Club ===
Each November the Emergency Response Club sponsors a Mass Casualty Incident Drill that simulates a shallow 7.2 magnitude earthquake and simulates trapping over 35 students and staff members in 12 separate buildings.

=== Math Team ===
Thomas Jefferson "Mathletes" have been active participants in state Mu Alpha Theta math competitions and have achieved noteworthy successes. They have placed in the Top 10 in national Mu Alpha Theta conventions for the last 14 years and many students have won individual championships. The team placed 7th in the nation at the 2018 nationals in Colorado Springs and 9th in the nation at the 2019 Mu Alpha Theta Nationals in Las Vegas Thomas Jefferson has hosted the Washington state Mu Alpha Theta contest since 2005. In 2011 TJHS was recognized for its "contributions to a history of outstanding mathematics service to its community" with the Mu Alpha Theta Rubin Award.

=== Puget Sound Skills Center ===
Students are able to receive vocational training at the Puget Sound Skills Center, formerly known as Sea-Tac Occupational Skills Center.

=== Raiderlinks ===
TJ’s Raiderlinks was an interdisciplinary program that prepares students for their preferred career path and is aligned with the Washington Assessment for Student Learning (WASL) and Federal Way Public Schools’ literacy goals. The program offered a curriculum that integrated technology into English, social studies, and science classes. Raiderlinks was a 1997 Computerworld Smithsonian Award for Excellence winner.

=== Running Start ===
Students wishing to participate in the Running Start program have dual enrollment at either Highline Community College or Green River Community College. Students may attend classes at either college or both, and can attend classes either full-time or part-time. Students must provide their own transportation, unless they are disabled and their Individual Education Plan requires the school district to provide it.

=== Speech and Debate ===
The Thomas Jefferson Speech and Debate Team placed second in state in the Washington State IE tournament in 2018. The World Schools Debate Team took home tied for 36th place honors at the national tournament in Fort Lauderdale, Florida

== Enrollment ==
Total number of students enrolled in October

Year	Students
1997	1,378
1998	1,411
1999	1,516
2000	1,460
2001	1,544
2002	1,522
Conversion to four year
2003	1,811
2004	1,809
2005	1,838
2006	1,908
2007	1,999
2008	2,020
2009	1,997
2010	1,939
2011	1,801
2012	1,731
2013	1,742
2014	1,830
2015	1,798
2016	1,766
2017	1,699
2018	1,747
2019	1,700
2020	1,699
2021	1,711
2022	1,801
2023	1,786
2024	1,813

== Athletics ==
TJ, a member of the Olympic Division of the North Puget Sound League since 2016, won the WIAA Washington State Boys High School Soccer Championship 8 times (1983, 1984, 1985, 1986, 1988, 1994, 2005 and 2013). Overall, Thomas Jefferson athletic teams finished 4th for the 2008–2009 season and 3rd in 2009–2010 for the South Puget Sound League all sports trophy.

== Notable alumni ==
- Tony Barnette – Pitcher for the Texas Rangers of Major League Baseball
- Bryan Pittman –Played for multiple NFL teams, including the Houston Texans
- James Sun – President of Zoodango, participant on The Apprentice
- Kenny Mayne – Sports personality
- Lamar Neagle – Professional soccer player with D.C. United in Major League Soccer
- Wade Webber – Former professional soccer player with Portland Timbers, Seattle Sounders and Dallas Burn and Miami Fusion of Major League Soccer (MLS); former IB history teacher at TJ
- Jeff Brigham – Pitcher for the Miami Marlins of Major League Baseball
- Molly Schumer – Geneticist and Assistant Professor of Biology at Stanford University
