= Federal Way Public Schools =

School district in Washington, United States

Address
- 33330 8th Ave S Federal Way, Washington, 98003; United States
- Coordinates: 47°18′17″N 122°19′29″W

District information
- Type: Public
- Motto: Each Scholar: A Voice. A Dream. A Bright Future.
- Grades: Pre-K through 12
- Established: May 22, 1929; 96 years ago
- Superintendent: Danielle Pfeiffer, Ed.D.
- Deputy superintendent(s): Marla Newton
- Accreditation: Northwest Accreditation Commission/Cognia (education)
- Schools: Elementary 21; K-8 3 Middle 6 High 4 Other 4
- Budget: $305,628,283 (2017-18)
- NCES District ID: 5302820

Students and staff
- Students: 21,765 (2020-2021)
- Teachers: 1,527 (2017-18)
- Staff: 2,835 (2017-18)
- Athletic conference: North Puget Sound League (NPSL) (Olympic)

Other information
- Website: fwps.org

Federal Way Public Schools is a school district in King County, Washington covering all of Federal Way and portions of Kent, Des Moines, Auburn, and unincorporated census-designated places Lakeland North and Lakeland South, encompassing 35 square miles (91 km^{2}).

== Schools ==
FWPS operates 37 schools, including:

- 20 Elementary schools
- 3 K-8 schools
- 6 Middle schools
- 4 High schools
- 4 Specialized schools

=== Elementary schools ===
- Adelaide Elementary School
- Brigadoon Elementary School
- Camelot Elementary School
- Enterprise Elementary School
- Green Gables Elementary School
- Lake Dolloff Elementary School (/ˈdoʊlɒf/ DOH-lof)
- Lake Grove Elementary School
- Lakeland Elementary School
- Mark Twain Elementary School
- Meredith Hill Elementary School
- Mirror Lake Elementary School
- Panther Lake Elementary School
- Rainier View Elementary School
- Sherwood Forest Elementary School
- Silver Lake Elementary School
- Star Lake Elementary School
- Sunnycrest Elementary School
- Twin Lakes Elementary School
- Valhalla Elementary School
- Wildwood Elementary School

=== K-8 schools ===
- Nautilus K-8 School
- Olympic View K-8 School
- Woodmont K-8 School

=== Middle schools ===
- Illahee Middle School (/ˈɪləhi/ IL-ə-hee)
- Kilo Middle School (/ˈkaɪloʊ/ KY-loh)
- Lakota Middle School
- Sacajawea Middle School
- Sequoyah Middle School
- Evergreen Middle School

=== High schools ===
- Decatur High School (/dɪˈkeɪtər/ dih-KAY-tər)
- Federal Way High School
- Thomas Jefferson High School ("TJ")
- Todd Beamer High School

=== Specialized schools ===
- Open Doors at Truman Campus
- Career Academy at Truman
- Internet Academy (K-12)
- Public Academy (6–10) ("FWPA", /ˈfwɑːpə/ FWAH-pə)
- TAF@Saghalie (6–12) (/səˈhɑːli/ sə-HAH-lee)

== History ==
Before the establishment of Federal Way Public Schools (FWPS) in 1929; the area was thinly populated and characterized by early settlers working in logging, trapping or previously served in the military. Settlements were sparse as many individuals preferred to reside closer to Tacoma or Seattle, where educational opportunities were more accessible. Within the Federal Way vicinity, education was overlooked, as homesteaders provided informal instruction to their families or had none at all. However, the landscape began to change by the early 1880s, as a wave of emigrants began to settle in and around Poverty Bay and Auburn-- marking the beginning of community development in the area.

The formal establishment of FWPS began in 1929, with the consolidation of five small school districts into District 210, known as Federal Way. Since its inception, the district has expanded significantly to accommodate the growing population. Federal Way High School opened its doors in 1938, with numerous elementary and middle schools following suit in the subsequent decades. As FWPS recently celebrated their 90th anniversary in 2019, they still vouch for their tagline, "Each scholar: a voice, a dream, a bright future. Since then, the school district underwent a transition from Junior High Schools to Middle Schools during the 2002 to 2004 time period.

== Governance ==
The Board of Directors for Federal Way Public Schools consists of five members who are elected by the voters of the entire school district. Each director must reside and be a registered voter, at the time of their election or appointment, in the geographical region, known as a Director District, they represent on the board. The Board also consists of two student representatives, selected by the Board of Directors. The length of the term is four years. Board meetings are generally held twice monthly. Currently, board meetings are typically scheduled for the second and fourth Tuesday of the month at 6:00 p.m., with some exceptions, at various schools in the district.

School Board Members
Director	Director District	First Elected or Appointed	Term End	Board Position
Eric Gollings	1	December 2025	2029	Board Director
Dr. Jennifer Jones	2	May 2019	2027	President
Luckisha Phillips	3	October 2018	2027	WSSDA Representative
Trudy Davis	4	October 2018	2029	Vice President and WIAA Representative
Joan Marie Murphy	5	December 2023	2027	Board Director

== Demographics ==
Out of 21,136 students, the demographic is as follows:

- 20.6% White
- 15.9% Black
- 12.2% Asian or Asian/Pacific Islander
- 11.3% Two or more races
- 6.1% Native Hawaiian or Other Pacific Islander
- 0.5% American Indian or Alaska Native

Enrollment by gender is

- 48% Female
- 52% Male

== Censorship ==
On January 9, 2007, the Federal Way Public School District temporarily blocked its teachers from showing global warming documentary An Inconvenient Truth without presenting a "credible, legitimate opposing view". The order was passed after Frosty Hardison, a Federal Way parent, complained about the movie's use in his daughter's class. Hardison was quoted in the Seattle Post-Intelligencer citing Biblical predictions of the age and end of the world, and saying neither condones Al Gore's view points being taught within school. The Board cited its policies on the teaching of controversial issues, neither of which provide for a moratorium. On January 23, after two weeks of criticism in the local and national scene, the Board backtracked and repealed the moratorium, but still insisted that opposing views need to be considered.

== Curriculum and programs ==
In the Federal Way Public School District, 71% of high school students in the district have taken an advanced course and 92% of students taking an advanced course are earning a passing grade. Along with this, 63% of students enrolled in a two or four year college program and 81% of scholars who attended a four-year postsecondary institution were continuously enrolled.

Federal Way Public Schools has also hosted an annual STEM Exploration Night since 2017; and in 2018, they launched Scholar Art in the City, an initiative that displays student art and writing in businesses and organizations across the city of Federal Way.

In 2021, the school district mandated that students earn 24 hours of community service as a graduation requirement, with this being the standard for the following graduating classes.
