= Andrew Faulkner =

American baseball player (born 1992)

- Relief pitcher
- Born: September 12, 1992 (age 33); Bamberg, South Carolina, U.S.
- Batted: Right Threw: Left

MLB debut
- August 31, 2015, for the Texas Rangers

Last MLB appearance
- September 25, 2016, for the Texas Rangers

MLB statistics
- Win–loss record: 0–0
- Earned run average: 4.41
- Strikeouts: 11
- Stats at Baseball Reference

Teams
- Texas Rangers (2015–2016)

Andrew Michael Faulkner (born September 12, 1992) is an American former professional baseball pitcher. He played in Major League Baseball (MLB) for the Texas Rangers.

== Career ==
=== Texas Rangers ===
Faulkner was drafted by the Texas Rangers in the 14th round of the 2011 Major League Baseball draft out of South Aiken High School in Aiken, South Carolina. He signed with the Rangers and made his professional debut with the Arizona League Rangers. In 2012 and 2013 he played for the Hickory Crawdads. Faulkner started 2014 with the Myrtle Beach Pelicans and was promoted to the Double-A Frisco RoughRiders in August.

Faulkner was promoted to the majors on August 28, 2015.

=== Baltimore Orioles ===
Faulker was traded to the Baltimore Orioles on April 6, 2017. Faulkner made 34 appearances for the Triple–A Norfolk Tides, recording a 2.79 ERA with 35 strikeouts in 38 2/3 innings of work. He elected free agency following the season on November 6.

On December 22, 2017, Faulkner re–signed with the Orioles on a new minor league contract. He again spent the year with Norfolk, logging a 6–2 record and 4.81 ERA with 52 strikeouts across 58 innings of work. Faulkner elected free agency following the season on November 3, 2018.

=== Los Angeles Dodgers ===
On February 15, 2019, Faulker signed a minor league deal with the Los Angeles Dodgers. He was released on June 18, without appearing in a single game for the organization.

=== Diablos Rojos del México ===
On June 19, 2019, Faulkner signed with the Diablos Rojos del México of the Mexican League. In 33 appearances for México, he struggled to an 0-1 record and 8.15 ERA with 16 strikeouts across 17 2/3 innings pitched. Faulkner was released by the Diablos on December 19.
