= Milton Gaither =

American historian and author

- Occupation: Historian
- Website: Faculty profile

Milton Gaither is an historian of education and a professor at Messiah College. Some of his most notable works include American Educational History Revisited, on the historiography of American education, and Homeschool: An American History.

== Early life ==
Gaither received a bachelor's degree from Wheaton College in 1990 in philosophy and literature, a Master of Arts in Religion from the Yale Divinity School in 1996 in church history and classical languages, and a Ph.D. in the history of American education from Indiana University Bloomington in 2000.
