= Washington State Board of Education =

State agency of Washington

The Washington State Board of Education (SBE) is a government body that oversees education in the U.S. state of Washington. It was established in 1877 by the Washington Territorial Legislature and primarily oversees K–12 education. The board also authorizes charter schools, which were legalized in 2012, and private institutions.

== Membership ==
The 16 members of the State Board of Education include those selected by the Governor of Washington, those elected by local school districts, a private school representative, and two student representatives. The students are advisory voting members selected by the Washington Association of Student Leaders.
