= 2017 Toronto Blue Jays season =

2017 Toronto Blue Jays
- League: American League
- Division: East
- Ballpark: Rogers Centre
- City: Toronto, Ontario
- Record: 76–86 (.469)
- Divisional place: 4th
- Owners: Rogers, CEO Mark Shapiro
- General managers: Ross Atkins
- Managers: John Gibbons
- Television: Sportsnet; Sportsnet One (Buck Martinez, Pat Tabler, Dan Shulman, Matt Devlin)
- Radio: Blue Jays Radio Network; Sportsnet 590 the FAN (Jerry Howarth, Joe Siddall, Mike Wilner, Duane Ward)

The 2017 Toronto Blue Jays season was the 41st season of the franchise in Major League Baseball, and the 27th full season of play (28th overall) at Rogers Centre. For the first time since the 2014 season, the Blue Jays failed to make it to the postseason, finishing fourth in the American League East with a 76–86 record.

== Offseason ==
The Blue Jays offseason began on October 19, 2016, when they were eliminated by the Cleveland Indians in the American League Championship Series. On October 24, general manager Ross Atkins held a press conference at the Rogers Centre to discuss the team's offseason plans. Atkins stated that the club would likely extend qualifying offers to pending free agents José Bautista and Edwin Encarnación, and pick up Jason Grilli's $3 million contract option for the 2017 season. He also told reporters that the team could explore stretching out Joe Biagini and using him as a starting pitcher, and that Roberto Osuna would remain a relief pitcher indefinitely. With regards to the coaching staff, Atkins stated that the coaches from 2016, with the exception of assistant hitting coach Eric Owens, would return for the 2017 season.

Center fielder Kevin Pillar underwent surgery in late October to repair a thumb ligament he tore in August, and was expected to be ready for 2017 spring training. Jason Grilli's option for the 2017 season was picked up by the team on November 5. On November 7, Bautista and Encarnación were each issued a $17.2 million qualifying offer for the 2017 season. R. A. Dickey signed with the Atlanta Braves on November 10. Lourdes Gurriel Jr., a Cuban player who defected in February 2016, signed a seven-year, $22 million contract with the Blue Jays on November 12. Encarnación and Bautista each declined their qualifying offers on November 14. Kendrys Morales signed a three-year, $33 million contract with the Blue Jays on November 18. The Blue Jays also claimed Dominic Leone and Leonel Campos on November 18, and added Anthony Alford, Ryan Borucki, and Richard Ureña to the 40-man roster to protect them from the Rule 5 draft. The St. Louis Cardinals and Brett Cecil finalized a four-year, $30.5 million contract on November 21. Steve Pearce signed a two-year, $12.5 million contract with Toronto on December 5. The Blue Jays selected Glenn Sparkman in the Rule 5 draft on December 8, and lost minor leaguers Jorge Flores, Jorge Saez, and Matt Smoral in the Triple-A phase of the draft.

Edwin Encarnación agreed to a three-year, $60 million contract with the Cleveland Indians on December 22, 2016. The contract was officially signed on January 5, 2017. The Blue Jays gained a compensatory first round draft selection in the 2017 Major League Baseball draft after the signing of Encarnación became official. On January 12, Darwin Barney and Ezequiel Carrera agreed to one-year contracts worth $2.8875 million and $1.1625 million respectively, avoiding salary arbitration. Aaron Loup agreed to a one-year, $1.125 million contract for the 2017 season the following day, leaving Marcus Stroman as the lone remaining Blue Jay eligible for arbitration. After several days of negotiations, José Bautista signed a one-year, $18 million contract with the Blue Jays on January 18. His contract also includes a mutual option for the 2018 season valued at $17 million, and a $20 million vesting option for 2019. Michael Saunders signed with the Philadelphia Phillies on January 19. Four Blue Jays players were featured to MLB's Top 100 prospects list when it was revealed on January 28. Vladimir Guerrero Jr. was rated the top prospect for Toronto, ranked 34th. Sean Reid-Foley, Anthony Alford, and Richard Ureña were ranked 64th, 70th, and 94th respectively.

Entering February, the Blue Jays were still in search of relief pitching and catching depth. Jarrod Saltalamacchia was signed to a minor league contract on February 6. Three days later, the Jays signed J. P. Howell and Joe Smith to a one-year contracts worth $3 million each. Chad Girodo and A. J. Jiménez were designated for assignment to make room on the 40-man roster for Howell and Smith. Marcus Stroman won his arbitration case against the Blue Jays on February 14, and was awarded a $3.4 million salary for the season.

=== Free agency ===
==== In ====
Date	Player	Former team	Details	Ref.
November 10, 2016	Kender Villegas	Milwaukee Brewers	Minor league contract	
November 12, 2016	Lourdes Gurriel Jr.	Industriales	Seven-year, $22 million contract	
November 13, 2016	Felipe Castenada	—N/a	Minor league contract	
November 13, 2016	Shane Opitz	—N/a	Minor league contract	
November 14, 2016	Casey Lawrence	—N/a	Minor league contract with an invitation to spring training	
November 18, 2016	Kendrys Morales	Kansas City Royals	Three-year, $33 million contract	
December 5, 2016	Steve Pearce	Baltimore Orioles	Two-year, $12.5 million contract	
December 7, 2016	Brett Oberholtzer	Los Angeles Angels of Anaheim	Minor league contract	
December 14, 2016	TJ House	Cleveland Indians	Minor league contract with an invitation to spring training	
December 15, 2016	Jeff Beliveau	Baltimore Orioles	Minor league contact with an invitation to spring training	
January 5, 2017	Gavin Floyd	—N/a	Minor league contract with an invitation to spring training	
January 18, 2017	José Bautista	—N/a	One-year, $18 million contract $17 million mutual option for the 2018 season $20 million vesting option for the 2019 season	
January 23, 2017	Gregorio Petit	Los Angeles Angels of Anaheim	Minor league contract with an invitation to spring training	
January 30, 2017	Lucas Harrell	Texas Rangers	Minor league contract with an invitation to spring training	
January 31, 2017	Jonathan Diaz	New York Yankees	Minor league contract	
February 6, 2017	Jarrod Saltalamacchia	Detroit Tigers	Minor league contract with an invitation to spring training	
February 9, 2017	J. P. Howell	Los Angeles Dodgers	One-year, $3 million contract	
February 9, 2017	Joe Smith	Chicago Cubs	One-year, $3 million contract	
February 16, 2017	Mat Latos	Chicago White Sox	Minor league contract with an invitation to spring training	

==== Out ====
Date	Player	New team	Details	Ref.
November 10, 2016	R. A. Dickey	Atlanta Braves	One-year, $7.5 million contract $8 million club option for the 2018 season	
November 21, 2016	Dustin Antolin	Washington Nationals	Minor league contract with an invitation to spring training	
November 21, 2016	Brett Cecil	St. Louis Cardinals	Four-year, $30.5 million contract	
December 6, 2016	Joaquín Benoit	Philadelphia Phillies	One-year, $7.5 million contract	
December 9, 2016	Junior Lake	Boston Red Sox	Minor league contract	
December 11, 2016	Scott Diamond	SK Wyverns	One-year, $600,000 contract	
December 13, 2016	Matt Dominguez	Boston Red Sox	Minor league contract with an invitation to spring training	
December 20, 2016	Chris Colabello	Cleveland Indians	Minor league contract with an invitation to spring training	
January 5, 2017	Edwin Encarnación	Cleveland Indians	Three-year, $60 million contract $25 million club option for the 2020 season	
January 19, 2017	Michael Saunders	Philadelphia Phillies	One-year, $8 million contract $9 million club option for the 2018 season	
January 23, 2017	Josh Thole	Arizona Diamondbacks	Minor league contract	
January 26, 2017	Scott Feldman	Cincinnati Reds	One-year, $2.3 million contract	

=== Waivers ===
==== In ====
Date	Player	Former team	Ref.
November 18, 2016	Dominic Leone	Arizona Diamondbacks	
November 18, 2016	Leonel Campos	San Diego Padres	
January 23, 2017	Juan Graterol	Los Angeles Angels of Anaheim	

== Spring training ==
Blue Jays pitchers and catchers reported to spring training on February 14 in Dunedin, Florida. Position players reported on February 17. Josh Donaldson suffered a right calf strain while working out on February 20, and was ruled out for 2–3 weeks. On February 23, the team announced that non-roster invitee Casey Lawrence would start the first game of the Grapefruit League season, and be followed in the rotation by Joe Biagini and Mat Latos. On March 10, in a game against the Detroit Tigers, non-roster invitee TJ House was struck in the head by a line drive. He remained on the ground for many minutes being attended to by medical staff, and left the field in an ambulance. Early in camp, concerns were raised about the health of second baseman Devon Travis and his availability for Opening Day. On March 13, it was announced that Travis, as well as Josh Donaldson, would take part in a minor league game the following day. On March 16, the Blue Jays renewed Aaron Sanchez's contract at the MLB-minimum of $535,000. The team had reportedly attempted to negotiate a raise in payment with Sanchez and his agent, Scott Boras, however the offer was refused by Sanchez and Boras.

On March 26, manager John Gibbons announced that Marco Estrada would be the starting pitcher on Opening Day, and be followed in the rotation by J. A. Happ, Marcus Stroman, Francisco Liriano, and Aaron Sanchez. Reliever Bo Schultz, who had been competing for a spot in the bullpen, underwent Tommy John surgery on March 29, and was ruled out for the entire season. On April 1, Gibbons signed a two-year extension with the Blue Jays, that also included an option for the 2020 season. The Opening Day roster was announced on April 2. Mike Bolsinger was designated for assignment, while Melvin Upton Jr. was released. Pitchers Roberto Osuna, Glenn Sparkman, and Bo Schultz opened the year on the disabled list, along with outfielder Dalton Pompey.

The Blue Jays ended spring training with a 12–18 win–loss record, excluding three tie games that did not count toward the standings. Their .400 winning percentage was the joint-worst (along with Detroit) among American League teams in pre-season.

== Standings ==
=== American League East ===
AL East
Team	W	L	Pct.	GB	Home	Road
Boston Red Sox	93	69	.574	—	48‍–‍33	45‍–‍36
New York Yankees	91	71	.562	2	51‍–‍30	40‍–‍41
Tampa Bay Rays	80	82	.494	13	42‍–‍39	38‍–‍43
Toronto Blue Jays	76	86	.469	17	42‍–‍39	34‍–‍47
Baltimore Orioles	75	87	.463	18	46‍–‍35	29‍–‍52

=== American League Wild Card ===
Division leaders
Team	W	L	Pct.
Cleveland Indians	102	60	.630
Houston Astros	101	61	.623
Boston Red Sox	93	69	.574

Wild Card teams (Top 2 teams qualify for postseason)
Team	W	L	Pct.	GB
New York Yankees	91	71	.562	+6
Minnesota Twins	85	77	.525	—
Kansas City Royals	80	82	.494	5
Los Angeles Angels	80	82	.494	5
Tampa Bay Rays	80	82	.494	5
Seattle Mariners	78	84	.481	7
Texas Rangers	78	84	.481	7
Toronto Blue Jays	76	86	.469	9
Baltimore Orioles	75	87	.463	10
Oakland Athletics	75	87	.463	10
Chicago White Sox	67	95	.414	18
Detroit Tigers	64	98	.395	21

== Records vs opponents ==
	Record			Games Left		
Opponent	Home	Road	Total	Home	Road	Total
AL East
Baltimore Orioles	4–6	3–6	7–12	–	–	–
Boston Red Sox	1–8	5–5	6–13	–	–	–
New York Yankees	6–4	4–5	10–9	–	–	–
Tampa Bay Rays	6–3	4–6	10–9	–	–	–
Totals	17–21	16–22	33–43	–	–	–
AL Central
Chicago White Sox	1–2	2–1	3–3	–	–	–
Cleveland Indians	2–1	0–3	2–4	–	–	–
Detroit Tigers	2–1	1–2	3–3	–	–	–
Kansas City Royals	1–2	1–2	2–4	–	–	–
Minnesota Twins	1–2	2–2	3–4	–	–	–
Totals	7–8	6–10	13–18	–	–	–
AL West
Houston Astros	2–2	1–2	3–4	–	–	–
Los Angeles Angels	1–2	2–2	3–4	–	–	–
Oakland Athletics	4–0	1–2	5–2	–	–	–
Seattle Mariners	4–0	2–1	6–1	–	–	–
Texas Rangers	2–1	2–2	4–3	–	–	–
Totals	13–5	8–9	21–14	–	–	–
National League
Atlanta Braves	0–2	1–1	1–3	–	–	–
Chicago Cubs	–	0–3	0–3	–	–	–
Cincinnati Reds	3–0	–	3–0	–	–	–
Milwaukee Brewers	0–2	2–0	2–2	–	–	–
Pittsburgh Pirates	2–1	–	2–1	–	–	–
St. Louis Cardinals	–	1–2	1–2	–	–	–
Totals	5–5	4–6	9–11	–	–	–
Grand Totals	42–39	34–47	76–86	–	–	–

Month	Games	Won	Lost	Pct.
April	25	8	17	.320
May	28	18	10	.643
June	26	11	15	.423
July	27	12	15	.444
August	28	13	15	.464
September	27	13	14	.481
October	1	1	0	1.000
Totals	162	76	86	.469

== 2017 draft ==
The 2017 Major League Baseball draft began on June 12.

Round	Pick	Player	Position	College/School	Nationality	Signed
1	22	Logan Warmoth	SS	North Carolina	(United States)	June 28
1*	28	Nate Pearson	RHP	Central Florida	(United States)	June 28
2	61	Hagen Danner	C	Huntington Beach High School (CA)	(United States)	June 25
3	99	Riley Adams	C	San Diego	(United States)	June 19
4	129	Kevin Smith	SS	Maryland	(United States)	June 19
5	159	Cullen Large	2B	William & Mary	(United States)	June 19
6	189	Brock Lundquist	OF	Cal State Long Beach	(United States)	June 19
7	219	Colton Laws	RHP	Charlotte	(United States)	June 19
8	249	Kacy Clemens	1B	UT Austin	(United States)	June 19
9	279	Zach Logue	LHP	Kentucky	(United States)	June 19
10	309	Justin Dillon	RHP	Cal State Sacramento	(United States)	June 19

- – Toronto received the 28th overall selection after Edwin Encarnación signed with the Cleveland Indians.

== Regular season ==
=== Opening Day ===
Opening Day starters
Position	Name
Catcher	Russell Martin
First baseman	Steve Pearce
Second baseman	Devon Travis
Shortstop	Troy Tulowitzki
Third baseman	Josh Donaldson
Left fielder	Ezequiel Carrera
Center fielder	Kevin Pillar
Right fielder	José Bautista
Designated hitter	Kendrys Morales
Pitcher	Marco Estrada

=== April ===
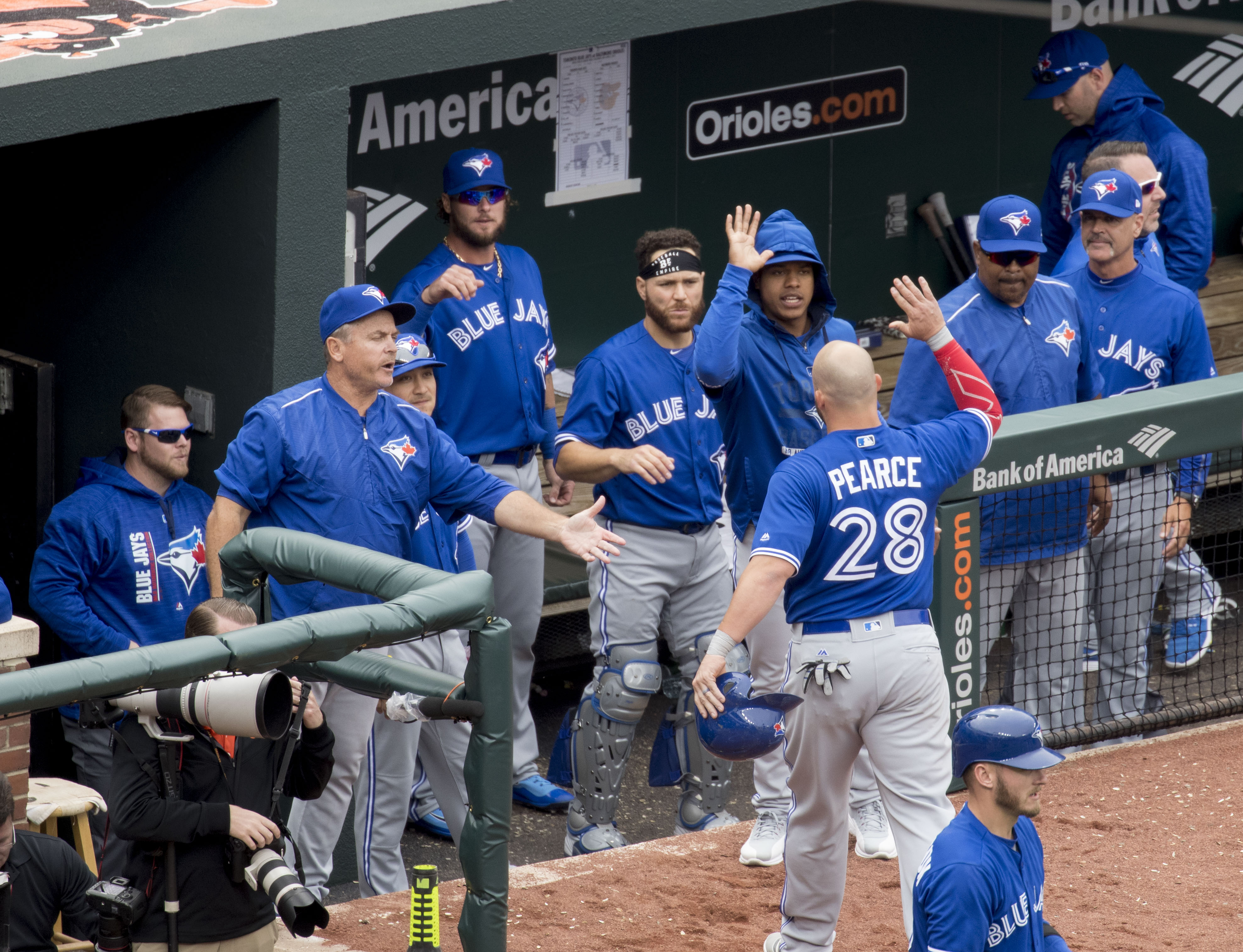
The Blue Jays dugout on Opening Day

For the fourth consecutive year, the Blue Jays opened their season on the road. Taking on Baltimore in a brief two-game series, Toronto sent Marco Estrada to the mound on Opening Day, while Baltimore countered with Kevin Gausman. The game went into extra-innings tied 2–2, before Jason Grilli allowed a walk-off solo home run to the 2016 American League leader in home runs, Mark Trumbo. After an off-day, the Blue Jays would drop to 0–2 on the year, losing to the Orioles 3–1. Toronto earned their first win of the year in the first game of their four-game series against the Tampa Bay Rays in St. Petersburg. Kendrys Morales hit a grand slam, and Marcus Stroman held Tampa to a single run in his 6 1/3 innings in the 5–2 victory. The Blue Jays would then drop the following three games to Tampa, by scores of 10–8, 3–2, and 7–2. The losses moved the Jays to a dismal 1–5 record, matching their worst start in franchise history. To make matters worse, reliever J. P. Howell was placed on the 10-day disabled list with a left shoulder injury, and Josh Donaldson was forced to leave the final game of the road trip with a calf injury.

Playing at home for the first time in 2017, the Blue Jays opened their nine-game home stand with a short two-game series against the Milwaukee Brewers. Toronto was narrowly defeated in the first game, 4–3, which extended their home opener losing streak to six. The Blue Jays were swept by the Brewers in the final game of the series, 2–0. Marcus Stroman threw the second complete game of his career in the loss. Baltimore then began a four-game series against the Jays with a 2–1 victory. Josh Donaldson, who had reaggravated his calf injury in Tampa, was forced to leave the first game against Baltimore with the same calf injury. He was placed on the 10-day disabled list the following day. The Blue Jays dropped the next game in the series, 6–4, which lowered their record to 1–9 and furthered the 2017 team's hold on the record for the worst start in franchise history. Their seven-game losing streak came to an end on April 15, when Kendrys Morales hit a walk-off solo home run in the bottom of the ninth inning to give the Jays a 2–1 victory. Toronto was unable to earn a series-split with Baltimore, dropping the final game by a score of 11–4. Aaron Sanchez was placed on the disabled list prior to the game with a blister on his pitching hand, and J. A. Happ was forced to leave the game with left elbow soreness. Happ would also go on the disabled list the following day. In the first game of a three-game series against the Boston Red Sox, the Blue Jays were unable to complete a late-game comeback, taking an 8–7 loss. Francisco Liriano and the Toronto bullpen held the Red Sox to six hits and no runs in a 3–0 win the following day. In the final game of the home stand, the Blue Jays were denied their first series-win of the year, as the offence was stymied by Red Sox ace Chris Sale. Despite some late heroics by Kendrys Morales to send the game into extra innings, the Blue Jays would lose 4–1 in ten innings. The loss moved the team to a 3–12 record, which was the worst in all of Major League Baseball.

Hoping to rebound from their woeful first 15 games, the Blue Jays began a seven-game road trip in Los Angeles, taking on the Angels for four. Ryan Tepera earned the first win of his career in the first game of the series, as Toronto barely held on to a slim 8–7 win in 13 innings. The second game saw the Jays fall just short of coming back from a 5–0 deficit, losing 5–4 and levelling the series at a game apiece. Marcus Stroman threw his second complete game in 12 days, allowing two runs on seven hits in the Blue Jays' 6–2 victory the following day. Controversy arose before, during, and after the final game of the series, as the umpiring crew from the previous game was replaced for undisclosed reasons. The replacement home plate umpire, Toby Basner, had previously drawn the ire of Toronto fans for ejecting Josh Donaldson in the first inning of a game against the Minnesota Twins the previous year. In the final game of the Angels series, Basner made several questionable calls against both teams, and ejected Blue Jays manager John Gibbons. The Angels would take the game, 2–1, and split the four-game series with Toronto. Toronto closed their road play for April in St. Louis, taking on the Cardinals. The first game of the series went into extra-innings tied 5–5. Chris Coghlan submitted a play-of-the-year candidate late in the game, leaping over Cardinals catcher Yadier Molina to score. In the top of the eleventh inning, Marcus Stroman was called upon to pinch-hit and delivered the first hit and double of his career, and later scored the go-ahead run to take a 6–5 lead that the team would not surrender. The second game of the series was rained-out, and rescheduled for the following day as a day-night doubleheader. The Cardinals would take both games, by scores of 8–4 and 6–4, and send the Blue Jays home with a losing record on their road trip.

To cap a disappointing April, the Jays returned home for a three-game series against Tampa Bay. The Rays hit four home runs in the first game of the series, defeating Toronto 7–4. The Jays held the Rays to a single run in the second game, and Roberto Osuna bounced back from a few rough outings with a 1-2-3 ninth inning to earn his second save of the season, closing the 4–1 win. In the final game of April, the Blue Jays scored three runs in the eighth inning to win 3–1, taking both their first series of the year and winning back-to-back games for the first time in 2017. The game was not without disappointment however, as Aaron Sanchez returned from the disabled list to start, but lasted only a single inning before leaving with a split fingernail on his pitching hand.

=== May ===
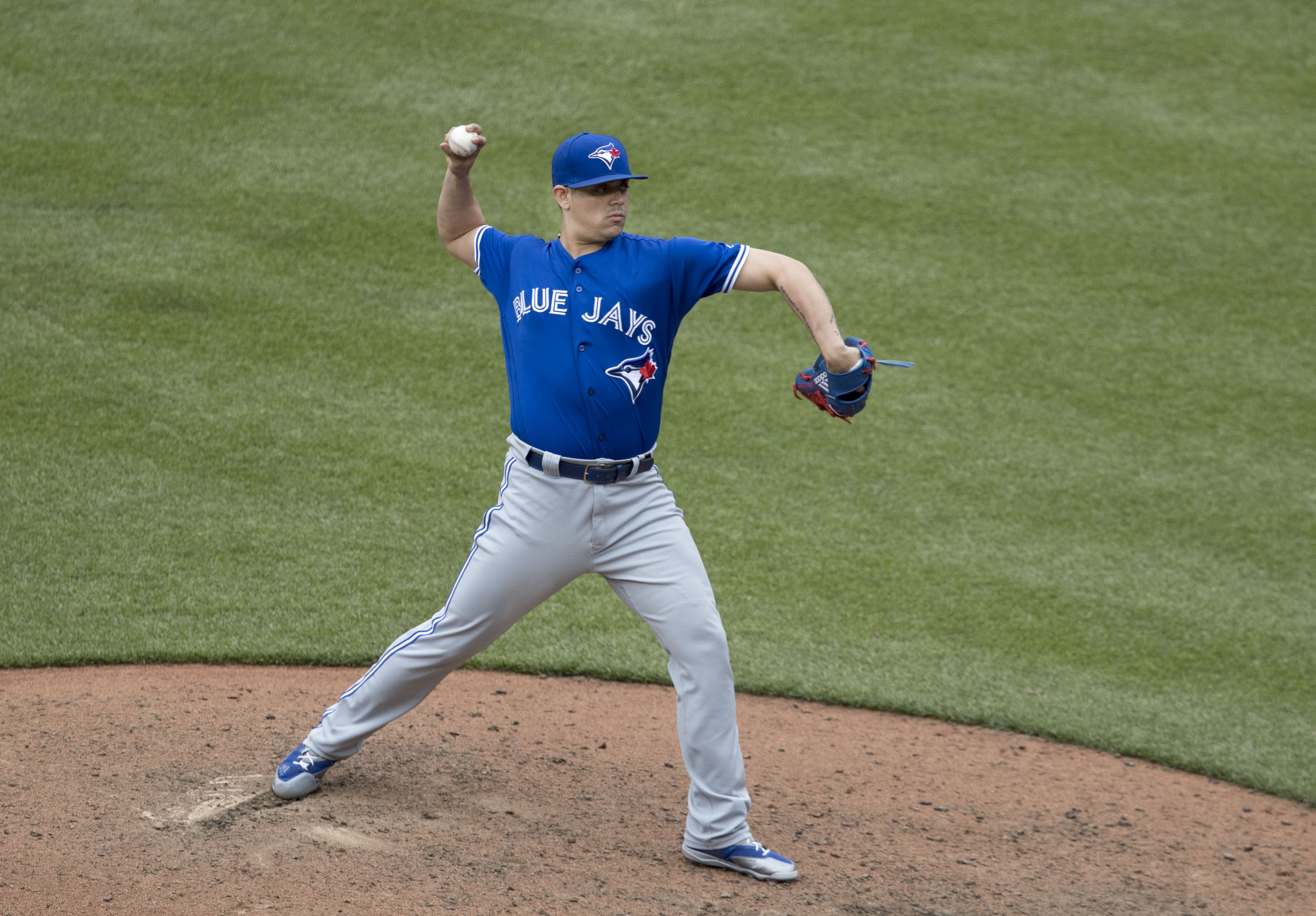
Roberto Osuna recorded eight saves and a 1.42 earned run average in May.

Looking to rebound from a disastrous April, the Blue Jays opened the month of May in New York, taking on the Yankees for three games. Ryan Goins led the way offensively in the first game, recording the first two-run sacrifice fly in franchise history in Toronto's 7–1 victory. New York would end the Blue Jays three-game winning streak with an 11–5 victory the following day. The Yankees would take the series with an 8–6 win in the finale, and drop the Blue Jays back to 10 games below .500. Marcus Stroman left the game in the third inning with a minor arm injury. Following a day-off, the Jays began their third series of the season against Tampa Bay. Kendrys Morales hit two home runs to lead Toronto to an 8–4 win in the series opener. Rays starter Jake Odorizzi held the Blue Jays to a single run over seven innings, as the Rays took the second game by a score of 6–1. Joe Biagini made his first Major League start in the final game of the series, pitching four strong innings and aiding the Blue Jays to a 2–1 win and just their second series-victory of the year.

The Blue Jays returned home from their 3–3 road trip and opened a nine-game home stand with a rematch of last year's American League Championship Series against the Cleveland Indians. The series marked Edwin Encarnación's return to Toronto, after departing in the offseason. Prior to the game, Russell Martin was placed on the 10-day disabled list with a left arm injury. Toronto emerged victorious in the first game, 4–2, led by a strong outing by Marcus Stroman. The Indians shutout the Jays in the second game, 6–0. Kendrys Morales left the game with a hamstring injury, adding to the growing list of injured Toronto players. The third and final game of the series went into the ninth inning tied 7–7, before the Jays managed to load the bases for Ryan Goins, who singled in the winning run. The Seattle Mariners then arrived in Toronto for a four-game series. Before the first game began, Toronto placed Francisco Liriano on the disabled list with left shoulder inflammation. Former Mariner Justin Smoak drove in four runs in the Blue Jays 7–2 victory in the opener. Joe Biagini and the Blue Jays bullpen held the Mariners scoreless in game two, earning a 4–0 victory. In the third game of the series, Kevin Pillar recorded three hits to give him the American League lead in hits with 47. The Blue Jays took the game by a score of 7–2, setting up an opportunity for their first sweep of the season. Kevin Pillar hit the first walk-off home run of his career in the final game of the series, giving the Blue Jays a 3–2 victory, their first four-game sweep since the 2015 season, and a five-game winning streak. Aaron Sanchez returned from the disabled list and made his first start since departing with a torn fingernail on April 30. To close their home stand, the Jays began a home-and-home series against the Atlanta Braves. Atlanta would take both games in Toronto, by scores of 10–6 and 9–6 respectively.

Continuing the series in Atlanta, the Blue Jays were defeated 8–4 by the Braves in a game that was rife with controversy. Freddie Freeman was hit on the wrist by an Aaron Loup pitch in the fifth inning, and left the game. In the seventh inning, Kevin Pillar struck out on a quick pitch from Braves pitcher Jason Motte. Immediately after striking out, Pillar called Motte a homophobic slur, which caused both Motte and Braves catcher Kurt Suzuki to confront him and led both dugouts to rush onto the field in defense of their teammates. In the eighth inning, José Bautista enraged the Braves by flipping his bat after hitting a solo home run. Following the game, Pillar publicly apologized to Motte. Prior to the game on May 18, the Blue Jays held a press conference with Pillar to apologize for the incident again, and announced that Pillar would be suspended for two games. It was also announced that Freeman would miss 10–12 weeks with a broken wrist. Toronto would avoid being swept by Atlanta, winning the final game of the four-game series 9–0. Marcus Stroman hit just the second home run by a Blue Jay pitcher in franchise history in the win. The Jays then returned to Baltimore for their first series at Camden Yards since the start of the season. Much like the game on Opening Day, the first game of the series went into extra innings before Jason Grilli allowed a walk-off home run. In the second game, Danny Barnes allowed a three-run home run to Welington Castillo, handing the Orioles a 7–5 win. The Blue Jays salvaged the final game of the series, defeating the Orioles by a score of 3–1. Marco Estrada struck out 12 Baltimore batters, matching his career-high for strikeouts in a single game. To close their road play for the month, the Jays swept the Milwaukee Brewers by scores of 4–3 and 8–4 in a brief, two-game series. Danny Barnes earned his first career win in the first game, and Ryan Goins hit his first grand slam in the second game, giving the Blue Jays a successful 4–3 road trip.

Heading home to close May, the Blue Jays faced the Texas Rangers for the first time since sweeping them out of the playoffs in the 2016 American League Division Series. Devon Travis hit a grand slam in the first game of the three-game series, and Justin Smoak and Kendrys Morales each homered in the 7–6 win. José Bautista provided all the offence the Jays would need in the second game, hitting a three-run home run to lead Toronto to a 3–1 win. Texas would take the final game, 3–1, and snap Toronto's five-game winning streak. The Blue Jays would close May with a home interleague matchup against the Cincinnati Reds. The Blue Jays racked up 23 hits in the first game, crushing the Reds 17–2. Kendrys Morales broke a 4–4 tie in the eighth inning of the second game with a two-run home run and sealed a 6–4 victory for Toronto. The Jays completed the sweep with a 5–4 victory to end May, led by home runs from Devon Travis and Luke Maile.

=== June ===
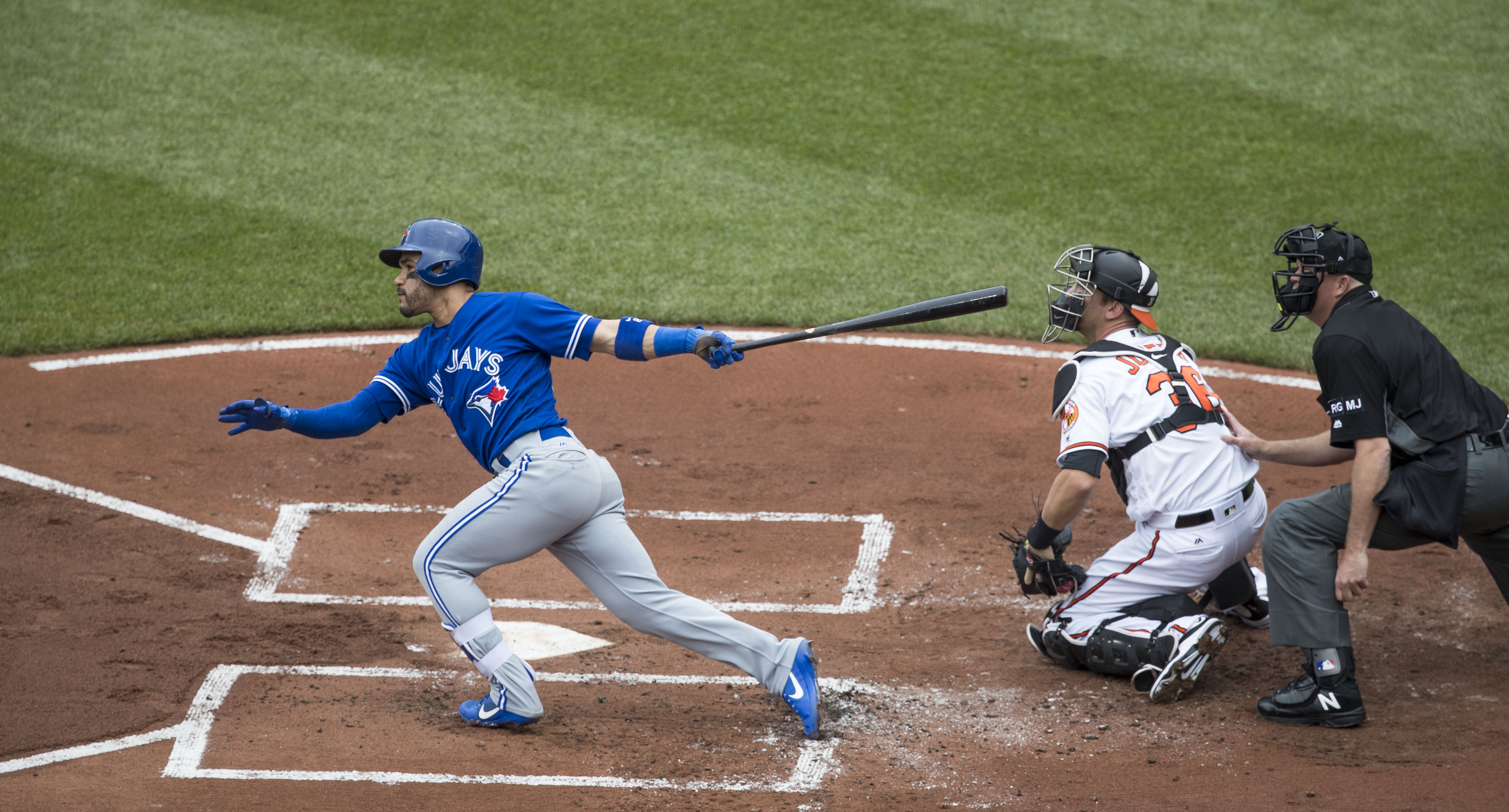
After recording a franchise-record 16 doubles in May, Devon Travis underwent knee surgery in June and was ruled out for three months.

June began with a four-game series against the Yankees at the Rogers Centre. Marco Estrada allowed four earned runs in the first inning of the first game, as the Yankees defeated the Jays 12–2. Francisco Liriano returned from the disabled list to start the second game, and led Toronto to a 7–5 victory with assistance from Josh Donaldson, who hit two home runs. In the third game, Jason Grilli became the first Blue Jay reliever to allow four home runs in a single relief inning, as New York shut out the Jays 7–0. The Blue Jays would earn the series-split in the final game, winning 3–2. Devon Travis was hit on the wrist by a pitch from Yankees starter Luis Severino, and left the game after the inning.

Following their 7–3 homestand, the Jays embarked on a west coast road trip, beginning in Oakland. The Athletics would take the first two games of the three-game series, by scores of 5–3 and 4–1. Prior to the second game, it was announced that Devon Travis had suffered a recurrence of the knee injury that had ended his 2016 campaign, and was placed on the disabled list. Josh Donaldson led the Jays to a 7–5 win in the third and final game of the series, hitting a two-run home run in the tenth inning. The Blue Jays then travelled to Seattle, to take on the Mariners. Seattle won the opener, 4–2, in what resembled a Toronto home game due to the large number of Blue Jay fans present at Safeco Field. The Jays would return the favour in the second game, winning 4–2 on the back of home runs by Kendrys Morales, Ezequiel Carrera, and Justin Smoak. The Jays would win the series with a 4–0 victory on Sunday, with J. A. Happ earning his first win of the season.

After an off-day, the Jays began a short, two-game series against the Tampa Bay Rays back at home. Prior to the first game, it was announced that Devon Travis had undergone knee surgery and was ruled out for at least three months. Rays rookie Jake Faria stymied the Toronto offence as Tampa took the opener, 8–1. Russell Martin's eighth inning home run led the Jays to a 7–6 win over Tampa in the final game of the series. The Chicago White Sox then came to Toronto for a three-game set. Joe Biagini allowed seven runs in the start, and Chicago rolled to an 11–4 win. The Sox would also take the second game by a score of 5–2. The Blue Jays avoided being swept, winning the final game 7–3 thanks to two-run homers from Russell Martin and Kendrys Morales.

After a frustrating 2–3 homestand, the Jays flew to Texas to face the Rangers. With Texas ahead 6–5 in the ninth inning, the Blue Jays came back with two runs off Rangers closer Matt Bush and held on to win 7–6. The Rangers would take the second game of the series, 6–1, and drop the Jays to 0–8 in games where they could have reached a .500 record for the first time in 2017. The Toronto offence put up six runs in the first inning and the pitching held on to a 7–5 victory in the third game. The Blue Jays would drop their ninth chance at a .500 record in the final game of the series, 11–4. To end their road games for June, the Jays went to Kauffman Stadium to take on the Kansas City Royals. Toronto held a 4–1 lead in the first game heading into the bottom of the ninth inning, however, with Roberto Osuna unavailable, the combination of Ryan Tepera, Aaron Loup, and Jason Grilli allowed four runs with two outs to hand Kansas a 5–4 win. Post-game, Osuna explained to the media that he was unavailable due to an anxiety issue he had recently developed, and noted that, while he felt fine physically, he was unsure of when he would pitch again. The Royals would hold on to a 3–2 win in the second game, with Jason Vargas earning his league-leading eleventh win of the year. The Blue Jays would emerge victorious in the third and final game of the series, 8–2, with Osuna pitching the final inning.

The Jays returned home to end the month of June, taking on Baltimore. Toronto fell to a dismal 2–8 record against the Orioles in the first game, losing 3–1. Marcus Stroman led the way in the second game, striking out eight Orioles over 7 2/3 scoreless innings as Toronto won 4–0. Baltimore would return the shutout in the final game of the series, winning 2–0. In the final game of June, the Blue Jays fell 7–4 in extra-innings to the Boston Red Sox. Starter Marco Estrada walked a career-high seven batters in the loss.

=== July ===
The series with the Red Sox continued into July, with Chris Sale and Francisco Liriano on the mound on Canada Day. Boston would emerge victorious, 7–1, with Sale striking out 11. The Red Sox would complete the sweep on July 2, with a 15–1 thrashing of the Jays. After the game, it was announced that Justin Smoak had been named the starting first baseman for the American League at the 2017 Major League Baseball All-Star Game.

To end the unofficial first half of the season, the Blue Jays embarked on a short three-game road trip against the Yankees before returning home for four games against the AL-leading Houston Astros. The Yankees would take the first game of their series, 6–3. Starter Marcus Stroman left after five innings due to concern that he was developing a blister on his right hand. The Blue Jays would snap their five-game losing streak with a 4–1 win over New York, and took the series with a 7–6 win in the finale, aided by four walks in the eighth inning by Dellin Betances. The team returned to the Rogers Centre and defeated the Astros 7–4 in the first game of their series. Before the July 7 game Roberto Osuna was added to the All-Star Game roster. Aaron Sanchez returned from his third DL stint of the year to start the second game of the series, but lasted only 1 2/3 innings and yielded seven runs. Houston would win the game, 12–2. The Jays took the third game by a score of 7–2, led by home runs from Josh Donaldson and Troy Tulowitzki. Houston shellacked the Blue Jays in the final game before the All-Star break, 19–1, handing Toronto their second-most lopsided loss in franchise history.

Following the All-Star break, the Blue Jays began a ten-game road trip in Detroit. The Jays began the second half on the right foot, walking ten times against the Tigers and winning 7–2. The Tigers would rebound to take the series, winning the next two games by scores of 11–1 and 6–5. The Jays then travelled to Fenway Park for the first time in 2017. Steve Pearce knocked in the go-ahead run in the eighth inning of the first game, aiding the Jays to a 4–3 win. Hanley Ramírez hit a walk-off solo home run in the 15th inning of the second game, as Boston evened the series with a 5–4 win. Aaron Sanchez struggled greatly in the third game of the series, taking his first loss at Fenway in seven starts, 5–1. Toronto would split the series, with Justin Smoak's two home runs helping them take the fourth and final game 8–6. To cap the road trip, the Blue Jays were swept in three games in Cleveland. Edwin Encarnación had 4 RBI in the Indians' 13–3 win in the first game. Danny Barnes yielded a walk-off home run to Francisco Lindor in the second game, taking the loss 2–1 in ten innings. Cleveland starter Corey Kluber dominated Toronto in the finale, striking out 14 in the 8–1 win.

The Jays took their 3–7 road trip back to the Rogers Centre for a seven-game homestand against the west coast Athletics and Angels. Francisco Liriano earned what became his final win as a Blue Jay in the first game of the four-game series, 4–2. César Valdez earned his first MLB win in seven years, defeating Oakland 4–1 the following night. The Jays took the third game of the series, 3–2, after a walk-off solo home run by Kendrys Morales. Steve Pearce hit a walk-off grand slam in the tenth inning of the final game to give the Jays an 8–4 win and a four-game sweep. Controversy arose in the fifth inning, after home plate umpire Will Little ejected John Gibbons, Marcus Stroman, and Russell Martin for arguing about the strike zone. The Blue Jays lost their first game against the Angels, 7–2, and also lost Troy Tulowitzki to a severe ankle sprain. With trade rumours swirling, Francisco Liriano pitched a shutout through five innings, but faltered in the sixth as Toronto dropped the second game, 6–5. The Jays salvaged the final game of the series, thanks to an ultimate grand slam from Steve Pearce, his second walk-off grand slam of the week.

Prior to their final game in July, the Blue Jays made two trades. The first sent Francisco Liriano to the Houston Astros for outfielders Nori Aoki and Teoscar Hernández, while the second swapped Joe Smith with the Cleveland Indians for pitcher Thomas Pannone and infielder Samad Taylor. In Chicago to take on the White Sox that night, the Jays were defeated 7–6.

=== August ===
Continuing their series with the White Sox, the Jays opened August with an 8–4 win, and took the series with a 5–1 victory the following day. After travelling to Houston, the Blue Jays were blown out by the Astros in the first of a three-game set, 16–7. Toronto took the second game, 4–3, after scoring the winning run in the tenth inning against Francisco Liriano, who they traded to Houston less than a week prior. The Astros would win the final game of the series, 7–6, aided by a four-run ninth inning.

The Jays began a crucial ten-game homestand on August 8, with three against division-rival New York. Josh Donaldson provided all of the offence for Toronto in the first game, hitting a pair of two-run home runs in the 4–2 victory. The Yankees won the second game, 11–5, which dropped the Jays to five games back of the Mariners for a wild-card spot. Marco Estrada's seven shutout innings led the Jays to a 4–0 win and a series victory the following day. Toronto began a three-game series with the Pittsburgh Pirates on August 11. The Jays lost the series opener, 4–2, and also lost Russell Martin to an oblique injury. In the second game of the series, first lieutenant Chris Rowley made his debut, and in doing so became the first West Point graduate to play in Major League Baseball. He earned the win, 7–2, after pitching 5 1/3 innings of one-run ball. The Jays improved their homestand record to 4–2 with a 7–1 win over the Pirates the next day. In the first of four games against Tampa Bay, Nick Tepesch held the Rays to one run through his six innings and earned the win, 2–1. Tampa continued their run of success against Marco Estrada in the second game, tagging him for six runs in the 6–4 Toronto loss. Toronto rebounded from the loss and took the last two games of the series, 3–2 and 5–3. The wins moved the Jays to within three games of a .500 record, which was the closest they had been to a level record since late June.

From that point on, however, the Blue Jays struggled in August. They flew to Chicago to take on the Cubs for three games and were swept by the defending World Series champions. Jake Arrieta led Chicago to a 7–4 win in the first game, and José Quintana took the victory in the second game, 4–3. The final game went into extra innings tied 3–3. The Jays took a 5–3 lead in the tenth, but Roberto Osuna and the Toronto defence could not hold the lead, taking the loss 6–5. In Tampa Bay for three games after an off-day, the Jays suffered their fourth-consecutive loss, 6–5. The Blue Jays hit six home runs the following night, ending their losing streak with a 7–6 win. Tampa Bay won the final game of the series, by a score of 2–0. The Jays took on the Minnesota Twins for three after returning to the Rogers Centre. While Justin Smoak hit his 35th home run of the year in the first game, Bartolo Colón led the Twins to a 6–1 win. The Jays won a slugfest second game, 10–9, but lost the rubber match with Minnesota the following day, 7–2. Byron Buxton hit three home runs for Minnesota in the final game. Toronto was then dealt a crushing blow to their slim playoff hopes, as they were swept by the visiting Red Sox. Boston took the three-game series by scores of 6–5, 3–0, and 7–1, which dropped the Jays to a season-low 11 games under .500. August ended on a minor high-note, as Toronto took the opening game of a four-game series in Baltimore 11–8, led by a three home run game from Kendrys Morales.

=== September and October ===
The Blue Jays opened September by continuing their series with the Orioles. Due to September roster expansion, the Blue Jays recalled Teoscar Hernández and Richard Ureña, and also added Carlos Ramírez and Michael Saunders to their roster in time for the second game of the series. Joe Biagini would pitch seven complete innings and record a career-high ten strikeouts in the game, but the Orioles walked off the Blue Jays in the thirteenth inning and won the game 1–0. Marcus Stroman started the third game of the series, but had to be removed after pitching 1 2/3 innings when he suffered a bruised elbow from a Mark Trumbo line drive. The Blue Jays however, went to win the game 7–2. In the series finale, the Blue Jays carried a 4–3 lead into the bottom of the ninth inning, but lost the game 5–4 in the twelfth inning. The road trip concluded with three games against the Red Sox in Boston, whom the Blue Jays had a 3–10 record against. In the first game, the Blue Jays hit four home runs as a team and won by a score of 10–4. The Blue Jays led 2–0 in the bottom of the ninth inning but lost the second game by a score of 3–2 in nineteen innings. Roberto Osuna suffered his league-leading tenth blown save of the season and the Blue Jays suffered their third extra-innings loss in five games. The Blue Jays also struck out a franchise-record 23 times in the game. The Blue Jays lost the rubber match 6–1, recording only four hits in the game. The Blue Jays ended their road trip 3–4, with three of the four losses being walk-off losses in extra innings.

Following an off day, the Blue Jays returned home, beginning a homestand with three games against the Detroit Tigers. Marcus Stroman made his scheduled start in the series opener following his injury-shortened start in Baltimore. Richard Ureña hit his first career home run, but the Blue Jays were unable to overcome a second inning deficit caused by a Nick Castellanos grand slam and lost the game by a score of 5–4. in the second game, Brett Anderson earned his first win for the Blue Jays and Kevin Pillar contributed with four hits, helping the Blue Jays win 5–4. In the rubber match, Teoscar Hernández recorded his first multi home run game, hitting his first two home runs for the Blue Jays and contributing with 5 RBI. The Blue Jays won the game 8–2 and won their first series since mid-August when they won three out of four games against the Tampa Bay Rays. The Blue Jays wrapped up their homestand with three games against the Baltimore Orioles, winning the first game 4–3. Joe Biagini started the second game and pitched his most impressive start, pitching eight innings for the first time in his career. Trailing 2–1 in the bottom of the ninth inning, the Blue Jays came back and defeated the Orioles 3–2, with Richard Ureña tallying his first career walk-off hit. The Blue Jays would not complete the sweep, as Baltimore would win the series finale 2–1. Following their 4–2 homestand, the Blue Jays traveled to Minnesota for a four-game series against the Twins, who currently occupied the second wildcard spot. In the first game, with the Blue Jays trailing the Twins 2–1 in the top of the ninth inning with two outs, Justin Smoak hit his 38th home run of the season to tie the game. However, the Blue Jays lost 3–2 in the tenth inning, suffering a fourth extra innings walk-off loss in September. The Blue Jays would rebound and win the second game of the series 4–3. In the third game of the series, Josh Donaldson hit two home runs and Marco Estrada pitched eight innings, leading the Blue Jays to a 7–2 victory. The series would not end nicely for the Blue Jays, as Joe Biagini struggled in his start in the series finale and was pulled after 1 1/3 innings in a 13–7 loss. Josh Donaldson hit five home runs in the four-game series.

Following an off day, the Blue Jays returned home for their final homestand of the season. Hosting the Kansas City Royals for a three-game series, the first game would feature a record-setting moment in the MLB as the Royals' Alex Gordon hit the 5694th overall home run of the 2017 season, setting an all-time record. Despite giving up the record-setting home run, the Blue Jays won the game 5–2 backed by a seven-inning effort by Marcus Stroman and a three RBI night by Darwin Barney. The Blue Jays would drop the final two games of the series; Brett Anderson surrendered eight runs and was pulled after 1 1/3 innings en route to a 15–5 loss in the second game and they would be shut out by Kansas City 1–0 in the series finale. This loss ensured the Blue Jays with finish their season with a losing record, for the first time since 2013. The Blue Jays then wrapped up their home schedule, hosting the New York Yankees for a three-game series. The first game was an 8–1 blowout win for Toronto, following a seven-inning outing by Marco Estrada and a Ryan Goins grand slam. However, the Blue Jays lost the second game 5–1, and were officially eliminated from playoff contention. In what would be his final home game as a Blue Jay, José Bautista contributed two hits and an RBI as the Blue Jays took the rubber match 9–5. Teoscar Hernandez, having been used primarily in right field throughout the month to replace Bautista, homered in each game of the series.

Ending their season with a six-game road trip, the Blue Jays returned to Boston for the second time in September to face the Red Sox for three games. The Blue Jays won the first two games 6–4 and 9–4, winning a series against the Red Sox for the first time in 2017. However, Marco Estrada struggled during the series finale and was pulled after 2 1/3 innings as the Blue Jays went on to lose 10–7. Following an off day, the Blue Jays began a three-game series against the Yankees in New York to conclude their season. The Blue Jays dropped the first two games of the series by scores of 4–0 and 2–1. The Blue Jays ended the season on a positive note, winning their final game by a score of 2–1, despite recording only two hits in the game. The Blue Jays finished their 2017 season with a 76–86 record and missed the playoffs for the first time since the 2014 season.

=== Game log ===
Legend
Blue Jays win	Blue Jays loss	Game postponed

2017 Game Log
April: 8–17 (Home: 4–8; Road: 4–9)

#	Date	Opponent	Score	Win	Loss	Save	Attendance	Record	GB
1	April 3	@ Orioles	2–3 (11)	Wilson (1–0)	Grilli (0–1)	—	45,667	0–1	1
2	April 5	@ Orioles	1–3	Bundy (1–0)	Happ (0–1)	Britton (1)	16,086	0–2	2
3	April 6	@ Rays	5–2	Stroman (1–0)	Snell (0–1)	Grilli (1)	12,678	1–2	1½
4	April 7	@ Rays	8–10	Cedeño (1–0)	Howell (0–1)	Colomé (3)	12,842	1–3	2½
5	April 8	@ Rays	2–3 (11)	Ramírez (1–0)	Lawrence (0–1)	—	21,838	1–4	3½
6	April 9	@ Rays	2–7	Odorizzi (1–0)	Estrada (0–1)	—	15,341	1–5	3½
7	April 11	Brewers	3–4	Peralta (2–0)	Happ (0–2)	Feliz (2)	48,456	1–6	3½
8	April 12	Brewers	0–2	Anderson (1–0)	Stroman (1–1)	Feliz (3)	29,919	1–7	4½
9	April 13	Orioles	1–2	Gausman (1–0)	Liriano (0–1)	Britton (4)	32,957	1–8	5½
10	April 14	Orioles	4–6	Miley (1–0)	Sanchez (0–1)	Britton (5)	39,547	1–9	6½
11	April 15	Orioles	2–1	Osuna (1–0)	Wilson (1–1)	—	40,743	2–9	5½
12	April 16	Orioles	4–11	Bundy (2–1)	Happ (0–3)	—	38,188	2–10	6½
13	April 18	Red Sox	7–8	Johnson (1–0)	Stroman (1–2)	—	29,281	2–11	6½
14	April 19	Red Sox	3–0	Liriano (1–1)	Porcello (1–2)	Osuna (1)	30,842	3–11	6½
15	April 20	Red Sox	1–4 (10)	Kimbrel (1–0)	Grilli (0–2)	—	44,283	3–12	7½
16	April 21	@ Angels	8–7 (13)	Tepera (1–0)	Chavez (1–3)	Biagini (1)	40,176	4–12	7½
17	April 22	@ Angels	4–5	Skaggs (1–1)	Lawrence (0–2)	Norris (1)	41,345	4–13	8½
18	April 23	@ Angels	6–2	Stroman (2–2)	Guerra (0–1)	—	35,034	5–13	7½
19	April 24	@ Angels	1–2	Chavez (2–3)	Liriano (1–2)	Norris (2)	25,304	5–14	8½
20	April 25	@ Cardinals	6–5 (11)	Grilli (1–2)	Socolovich (0–1)	Tepera (1)	40,223	6–14	7½
–	April 26	@ Cardinals	Postponed (rain). Makeup date: April 27.						
21	April 27	@ Cardinals	4–8 (11)	Bowman (1–0)	Tepera (1–1)		40,099	6–15	8½
22	April 27	@ Cardinals	4–6	Wainwright (2–3)	Lawrence (0–3)	Rosenthal (2)	40,035	6–16	9
23	April 28	Rays	4–7	Pruitt (3–0)	Grilli (1–3)	Whitley (1)	36,256	6–17	9
24	April 29	Rays	4–1	Liriano (2–2)	Andriese (1–1)	Osuna (2)	42,419	7–17	9
25	April 30	Rays	3–1	Howell (1–1)	Colomé (0–2)	Osuna (3)	42,986	8–17	8

May: 18–10 (Home: 11–4; Road: 7–6)

#	Date	Opponent	Score	Win	Loss	Save	Attendance	Record	GB
26	May 1	@ Yankees	7–1	Estrada (1–1)	Severino (2–2)	—	25,566	9–17	8
27	May 2	@ Yankees	5–11	Tanaka (4–1)	Latos (0–1)	—	30,058	9–18	8
28	May 3	@ Yankees	6–8	Betances (3–1)	Biagini (0–1)	Chapman (6)	35,559	9–19	9
29	May 5	@ Rays	8–4	Loup (1–0)	Díaz (0–2)	—	12,461	10–19	9
30	May 6	@ Rays	1–6	Odorizzi (2–1)	Estrada (1–2)	—	12,035	10–20	10
31	May 7	@ Rays	2–1	Tepera (2–1)	Cobb (2–3)	Osuna (4)	15,068	11–20	10
32	May 8	Indians	4–2	Stroman (3–2)	Bauer (2–4)	Osuna (5)	40,014	12–20	10
33	May 9	Indians	0–6	Carrasco (4–2)	Bolsinger (0–1)	—	32,688	12–21	10½
34	May 10	Indians	8–7	Osuna (2–0)	Allen (0–1)	—	35,115	13–21	9½
35	May 11	Mariners	7–2	Estrada (2–2)	De Jong (0–3)	—	29,120	14–21	9
36	May 12	Mariners	4–0	Biagini (1–1)	Bergman (0–1)	—	32,865	15–21	8
37	May 13	Mariners	7–2	Leone (1–0)	Vincent (1–1)	—	42,346	16–21	7
38	May 14	Mariners	3–2	Tepera (3–1)	Díaz (1–2)	—	42,030	17–21	6½
39	May 15	Braves	6–10	Colón (2–4)	Bolsinger (0–2)	—	29,766	17–22	7
40	May 16	Braves	6–9	Ramírez (2–1)	Barnes (0–1)	—	34,431	17–23	8
41	May 17	@ Braves	4–8	Foltynewicz (2–4)	Biagini (1–2)	—	28,293	17–24	9
42	May 18	@ Braves	9–0	Stroman (4–2)	Teherán (3–4)	—	25,419	18–24	8
43	May 19	@ Orioles	3–5 (10)	Givens (4–0)	Grilli (1–4)	—	31,916	18–25	8
44	May 20	@ Orioles	5–7	Givens (5–0)	Barnes (0–2)	Brach (9)	45,416	18–26	8½
45	May 21	@ Orioles	3–1	Estrada (3–2)	Miley (1–2)	Osuna (6)	36,632	19–26	8
46	May 23	@ Brewers	4–3	Barnes (1–2)	Nelson (2–3)	Osuna (7)	30,742	20–26	7½
47	May 24	@ Brewers	8–4	Stroman (5–2)	Garza (2–1)	—	26,607	21–26	7½
48	May 26	Rangers	7–6	Loup (2–0)	Griffin (4–2)	Osuna (8)	40,754	22–26	6½
49	May 27	Rangers	3–1	Estrada (4–2)	Darvish (5–3)	Osuna (9)	46,825	23–26	6½
50	May 28	Rangers	1–3	Cashner (2–4)	Biagini (1–3)	Bush (6)	46,188	23–27	7½
51	May 29	Reds	17–2	Stroman (6–2)	Bonilla (0–3)	—	29,844	24–27	6½
52	May 30	Reds	6–4	Smith (1–0)	Wood (0–3)	Osuna (10)	32,747	25–27	6½
53	May 31	Reds	5–4	Grilli (2–4)	Peralta (2–1)	Osuna (11)	44,058	26–27	5½

June: 11–15 (Home: 5–8; Road: 6–7)

#	Date	Opponent	Score	Win	Loss.	Save	Attendance	Record	GB
54	June 1	Yankees	2–12	Sabathia (6–2)	Estrada (4–3)	—	37,722	26–28	6½
55	June 2	Yankees	7–5	Liriano (3–2)	Pineda (6–3)	Osuna (12)	44,261	27–28	5½
56	June 3	Yankees	0–7	Montgomery (3–4)	Biagini (1–4)	—	47,226	27–29	6½
57	June 4	Yankees	3–2	Smith (2–0)	Clippard (0–3)	Osuna (13)	46,782	28–29	5½
58	June 5	@ Athletics	3–5	Manaea (5–3)	Happ (0–4)	Casilla (9)	12,980	28–30	6
59	June 6	@ Athletics	1–4	Hahn (2–4)	Estrada (4–4)	Casilla (10)	16,643	28–31	6
60	June 7	@ Athletics	7–5 (10)	Tepera (4–1)	Montas (1–1)	Osuna (14)	15,076	29–31	6
61	June 9	@ Mariners	2–4	Cloyd (1–0)	Biagini (1–5)	Díaz (10)	33,518	29–32	7½
62	June 10	@ Mariners	4–2	Stroman (7–2)	Zych (2–2)	Osuna (15)	45,480	30–32	7½
63	June 11	@ Mariners	4–0	Happ (1–4)	Paxton (5–1)	Osuna (16)	41,137	31–32	7½
64	June 13	Rays	1–8	Faria (2–0)	Estrada (4–5)	—	39,404	31–33	8
65	June 14	Rays	7–6	Smith (3–0)	Alvarado (0–1)	Osuna (17)	37,734	32–33	7
66	June 16	White Sox	4–11	Quintana (3–8)	Biagini (1–6)	—	39,071	32–34	6½
67	June 17	White Sox	2–5	Pelfrey (3–5)	Stroman (7–3)	Robertson (11)	47,171	32–35	6½
68	June 18	White Sox	7–3	Happ (2–4)	Swarzak (3–2)	—	46,599	33–35	5½
69	June 19	@ Rangers	7–6	Beliveau (1–0)	Bush (2–2)	Osuna (18)	25,115	34–35	5
70	June 20	@ Rangers	1–6	Martinez (2–3)	Liriano (3–3)	—	24,169	34–36	5½
71	June 21	@ Rangers	7–5	Biagini (2–6)	Ross (1–1)	Osuna (19)	28,376	35–36	5
72	June 22	@ Rangers	4–11	Pérez (4–6)	Stroman (7–4)	—	26,764	35–37	5
73	June 23	@ Royals	4–5	Soria (4–2)	Loup (2–1)	—	38,848	35–38	6
74	June 24	@ Royals	2–3	Vargas (11–3)	Estrada (4–6)	Herrera (18)	26,938	35–39	6
75	June 25	@ Royals	8–2	Liriano (4–3)	Alexander (0–2)	—	37,182	36–39	5
76	June 27	Orioles	1–3	Gausman (4–7)	Biagini (2–7)	Brach (14)	40,606	36–40	6½
77	June 28	Orioles	4–0	Stroman (8–4)	Miley (3–6)	—	38,847	37–40	5½
78	June 29	Orioles	0–2	Jiménez (3–3)	Happ (2–5)	Brach (15)	37,291	37–41	6½
79	June 30	Red Sox	4–7 (11)	Boyer (1–1)	Loup (2–2)	Kimbrel (23)	41,357	37–42	7½

July: 12–15 (Home: 7–6; Road: 5–9)

#	Date	Opponent	Score	Win	Loss	Save	Attendance	Record	GB
80	July 1	Red Sox	1–7	Sale (11–3)	Liriano (4–4)	—	46,672	37–43	8½
81	July 2	Red Sox	1–15	Pomeranz (8–4)	Biagini (2–8)	Abad (1)	46,696	37–44	9½
82	July 3	@ Yankees	3–6	Tanaka (7–7)	Stroman (8–5)	—	46,616	37–45	10½
83	July 4	@ Yankees	4–1	Happ (3–5)	Sabathia (7–3)	Osuna (20)	44,018	38–45	10½
84	July 5	@ Yankees	7–6	Barnes (2–2)	Betances (3–4)	Osuna (21)	38,691	39–45	9½
85	July 6	Astros	7–4	Liriano (5–4)	McCullers Jr. (7–2)	Osuna (22)	40,949	40–45	8½
86	July 7	Astros	2–12	Morton (6–3)	Sanchez (0–2)	—	37,332	40–46	9½
87	July 8	Astros	7–2	Stroman (9–5)	Fiers (5–4)	—	46,659	41–46	8½
88	July 9	Astros	1–19	Peacock (7–1)	Happ (3–6)	—	46,622	41–47	8½
89	July 14	@ Tigers	7–2	Sanchez (1–2)	Verlander (5–7)	—	37,879	42–47	8½
90	July 15	@ Tigers	1–11	Fulmer (10–6)	Liriano (5–5)	—	40,036	42–48	8½
91	July 16	@ Tigers	5–6 (11)	Saupold (2–1)	Beliveau (1–1)	—	37,173	42–49	9
92	July 17	@ Red Sox	4–3	Tepera (5–1)	Hembree (1–3)	Osuna (23)	36,144	43–49	8
93	July 18	@ Red Sox	4–5 (15)	Velázquez (2–1)	Bolsinger (0–3)	—	36,488	43–50	9
94	July 19	@ Red Sox	1–5	Pomeranz (10–4)	Sanchez (1–3)	—	37,360	43–51	10
95	July 20	@ Red Sox	8–6	Leone (2–0)	Fister (0–4)	Osuna (24)	37,094	44–51	9
96	July 21	@ Indians	3–13	Bauer (8–8)	Estrada (4–7)	—	34,284	44–52	10
97	July 22	@ Indians	1–2 (10)	Shaw (3–4)	Barnes (2–3)	—	34,569	44–53	10
98	July 23	@ Indians	1–8	Kluber (8–3)	Happ (3–7)	—	30,701	44–54	10
99	July 24	Athletics	4–2	Liriano (6–5)	Smith (0–1)	Osuna (25)	39,613	45–54	9
100	July 25	Athletics	4–1	Valdez (1–0)	Gray (6–5)	Osuna (26)	40,624	46–54	8
101	July 26	Athletics	3–2	Biagini (3–8)	Casilla (2–5)	—	41,984	47–54	8
102	July 27	Athletics	8–4 (10)	Osuna (3–0)	Hendriks (3–2)	—	47,484	48–54	7½
103	July 28	Angels	2–7	Bridwell (5–1)	Happ (3–8)	—	39,828	48–55	8
104	July 29	Angels	5–6	Scribner (1–0)	Osuna (3–1)	Norris (16)	46,502	48–56	9
105	July 30	Angels	11–10	Dermody (1–0)	Norris (1–4)	—	46,852	49–56	8
106	July 31	@ White Sox	6–7	Beck (2–1)	Osuna (3–2)	—	13,023	49–57	9

August: 13–15 (Home: 8–8; Road: 5–7)

#	Date	Opponent	Score	Win	Loss	Save	Attendance	Record	GB
107	August 1	@ White Sox	8–4	Stroman (10–5)	Pelfrey (3–9)	—	14,622	50–57	8½
108	August 2	@ White Sox	5–1	Happ (4–8)	Holland (5–11)	Osuna (27)	20,878	51–57	8
109	August 4	@ Astros	7–16	Peacock (10–1)	Valdez (1–1)	—	39,287	51–58	9½
110	August 5	@ Astros	4–3 (10)	Tepera (6–1)	Liriano (6–7)	Osuna (28)	41,950	52–58	9½
111	August 6	@ Astros	6–7	Martes (4–1)	Osuna (3–3)	—	36,300	52–59	10½
112	August 8	Yankees	4–2	Happ (5–8)	Sabathia (9–5)	Osuna (29)	41,596	53–59	10½
113	August 9	Yankees	5–11	Green (2–0)	Tepesch (0–2) (Note: 0–1 with Toronto)	—	39,554	53–60	11½
114	August 10	Yankees	4–0	Estrada (5–7)	Gray (6–7)	—	43,212	54–60	11
115	August 11	Pirates	2–4	Taillon (7–5)	Stroman (10–6)	Rivero (12)	35,965	54–61	11
116	August 12	Pirates	7–2	Rowley (1–0)	Williams (5–5)	—	46,179	55–61	11
117	August 13	Pirates	7–1	Happ (6–8)	Kuhl (5–8)	—	43,618	56–61	11
118	August 14	Rays	2–1	Tepesch (1–2) (Note: 1–1 with Toronto)	Odorizzi (6–6)	Osuna (30)	32,151	57–61	10
119	August 15	Rays	4–6	Snell (1–6)	Estrada (5–8)	Colomé (35)	33,178	57–62	11
120	August 16	Rays	3–2	Stroman (11–6)	Faria (5–4)	Osuna (31)	36,784	58–62	11
121	August 17	Rays	5–3	Leone (3–0)	Hunter (2–4)	Osuna (32)	46,855	59–62	10½
122	August 18	@ Cubs	4–7	Arrieta (13–8)	Happ (6–9)	Davis (25)	41,814	59–63	11½
123	August 19	@ Cubs	3–4	Quintana (8–10)	Barnes (2–4)	Davis (26)	41,558	59–64	11½
124	August 20	@ Cubs	5–6 (10)	Wilson (4–4)	Osuna (3–4)	—	41,459	59–65	12½
125	August 22	@ Rays	5–6	Archer (9–7)	Rowley (1–1)	Colomé (37)	11,948	59–66	13
126	August 23	@ Rays	7–6	Tepera (7–1)	Hunter (2–5)	Osuna (33)	8,246	60–66	13
127	August 24	@ Rays	0–2	Cishek (3–1)	Koehler (1–6) (Note: 0–1 with Toronto)	Colomé (38)	10,133	60–67	13
128	August 25	Twins	1–6	Colón (6–10)	Happ (6–10)	—	37,525	60–68	13
129	August 26	Twins	10–9	Estrada (6–8)	Gee (1–1)	Osuna (34)	45,591	61–68	12
130	August 27	Twins	2–7	Gibson (8–10)	Biagini (3–9)	—	42,478	61–69	12
131	August 28	Red Sox	5–6	Pomeranz (14–4)	Barnes (2–5)	Kimbrel (30)	35,630	61–70	13
132	August 29	Red Sox	0–3	Sale (15–6)	Anderson (2–3) (Note: 0–1 with Toronto)	Kimbrel (31)	34,674	61–71	14
133	August 30	Red Sox	1–7	Porcello (9–15)	Koehler (1–7) (Note: 0–2 with Toronto)	—	37,693	61–72	15
134	August 31	@ Orioles	11–8	Estrada (7–8)	Hellickson (8–8)	Osuna (35)	13,802	62–72	14

September: 13–14 (Home: 7–5; Road: 6–9)

#	Date	Opponent	Score	Win	Loss	Save	Attendance	Record	GB
135	September 1	@ Orioles	0–1 (13)	Yacabonis (1–0)	Loup (2–3)	—	16,627	62–73	15
136	September 2	@ Orioles	7–2	Dermody (2–0)	Miley (8–11)	—	14,815	63–73	14
137	September 3	@ Orioles	4–5 (12)	Yacabonis (2–0)	Barnes (2–6)	—	27,231	63–74	14
138	September 4	@ Red Sox	10–4	Happ (7–10)	Porcello (9–16)	—	34,311	64–74	13
139	September 5	@ Red Sox	2–3 (19)	Velázquez (3–1)	Rowley (1–2)	—	33,009	64–75	14
140	September 6	@ Red Sox	1–6	Fister (5–7)	Biagini (3–10)	—	33,190	64–76	15
141	September 8	Tigers	4–5	Farmer (4–2)	Stroman (11–7)	Greene (7)	31,961	64–77	16
142	September 9	Tigers	5–4	Anderson (3–3) (Note: 1–1 with Toronto)	Saupold (3–2)	Tepera (2)	44,218	65–77	16
143	September 10	Tigers	8–2	Happ (8–10)	Sánchez (3–4)	Santos (1)	39,797	66–77	15
144	September 11	Orioles	4–3	Estrada (8–8)	Jiménez (5–10)	Leone (1)	28,401	67–77	14½
145	September 12	Orioles	3–2	Mayza (1–0)	Britton (2–1)	—	29,055	68–77	14½
146	September 13	Orioles	1–2	Gausman (11–10)	Stroman (11–8)	Britton (14)	31,714	68–78	14½
147	September 14	@ Twins	2–3 (10)	Gee (2–2)	Santos (0–1)	—	22,644	68–79	15½
148	September 15	@ Twins	4–3	Happ (9–10)	Colón (6–13)	Osuna (36)	27,902	69–79	15½
149	September 16	@ Twins	7–2	Estrada (9–8)	Mejía (4–6)	—	29,917	70–79	15½
150	September 17	@ Twins	7–13	Gibson (11–10)	Biagini (3–11)	—	27,572	70–80	15½
151	September 19	Royals	5–2	Stroman (12–8)	Kennedy (4–12)	Osuna (37)	33,554	71–80	16
152	September 20	Royals	5–15	Junis (8–2)	Anderson (3–4) (Note: 1–2 with Toronto)	—	33,050	71–81	17
153	September 21	Royals	0–1	Vargas (17–10)	Happ (9–11)	Minor (2)	35,861	71–82	17½
154	September 22	Yankees	8–1	Estrada (10–8)	Tanaka (12–12)	—	42,153	72–82	17½
155	September 23	Yankees	1–5	Gray (10–11)	Biagini (3–12)	—	46,949	72–83	18½
156	September 24	Yankees	9–5	Stroman (13–8)	García (5–10)	—	47,394	73–83	18½
157	September 25	@ Red Sox	6–4	Anderson (4–4) (Note: 2–2 with Toronto)	Pomeranz (16–6)	Osuna (38)	33,940	74–83	17½
158	September 26	@ Red Sox	9–4	Happ (10–11)	Sale (17–8)	—	33,999	75–83	16½
159	September 27	@ Red Sox	7–10	Porcello (11–17)	Estrada (10–9)	—	34,445	75–84	17½
160	September 29	@ Yankees	0–4	Tanaka (13–12)	Biagini (3–13)	Chapman (21)	35,735	75–85	17
161	September 30	@ Yankees	1–2	Sabathia (14–5)	Stroman (13–9)	Chapman (22)	39,457	75–86	18

October: 1–0 (Home: 0–0; Road: 1–0)

#	Date	Opponent	Score	Win	Loss	Save	Attendance	Record	GB
162	October 1	@ Yankees	2–1	Barnes (3–6)	Germán (0–1)	Osuna (39)	37,428	76–86	17

== Roster ==
2017 Toronto Blue Jays
Roster
Pitchers: 46 Brett Anderson; 24 Danny Barnes; 36 Jeff Beliveau; 31 Joe Biagini; 49 Mike Bolsinger; 60 Leonel Campos; 38 Taylor Cole; 50 Matt Dermody; 25 Marco Estrada; 37 Jason Grilli; 33 J. A. Happ; 57 Lucas Harrell; 44 TJ House; 56 J. P. Howell; 34 Tom Koehler; 57 Mat Latos; 59 Casey Lawrence; 51 Dominic Leone; 45 Francisco Liriano; 62 Aaron Loup; 58 Tim Mayza; 54 Roberto Osuna; 36 Carlos Ramírez; 45 Chris Rowley; 41 Aaron Sanchez; 56 Luis Santos; 33,53 Chris Smith; 38 Joe Smith; 46 Glenn Sparkman; 6 Marcus Stroman; 52 Ryan Tepera; 48 Nick Tepesch; 64 César Valdez	Catchers: 1 Raffy Lopez; 22 Luke Maile; 55 Russell Martin; 39,47 Miguel Montero; 43 Mike Ohlman; 10 Jarrod Saltalamacchia; Infielders: 18 Darwin Barney; 7 Chris Coghlan; 20 Josh Donaldson; 17 Ryan Goins; 8 Kendrys Morales; 39 Rob Refsnyder; 14 Justin Smoak; 29 Devon Travis; 2 Troy Tulowitzki; 7 Richard Ureña	Outfielders: 30 Anthony Alford; 23 Nori Aoki; 19 José Bautista; 3 Ezequiel Carrera; 9 Darrell Ceciliani; 37 Teoscar Hernández; 10 Ian Parmley; 28 Steve Pearce; 11 Kevin Pillar; 21 Michael Saunders; 15 Dwight Smith Jr.	Manager: 5 John Gibbons; Coaches: 61 Alex Andreopoulos (bullpen catcher); 16 DeMarlo Hale (bench); 26 Brook Jacoby (hitting); 35 Dane Johnson (bullpen); 34,21,23 Tim Leiper (first base); 63 Jason Phillips (bullpen catcher); 4 Luis Rivera (third base); 27 Derek Shelton (quality control); 40 Pete Walker (pitching)

== Statistics ==
=== Batting ===
Note: G = Games played; AB = At bats; R = Runs scored; H = Hits; 2B = Doubles; 3B = Triples; HR = Home runs; RBI = Runs batted in; SB = Stolen bases; BB = Walks; AVG = Batting average; Ref. = Reference

Player	G	AB	R	H	2B	3B	HR	RBI	SB	BB	AVG	Ref.
Anthony Alford	4	8	0	1	1	0	0	0	0	0	.125	
Nori Aoki	12	32	4	9	1	0	3	8	0	1	.281	
Darwin Barney	129	336	34	78	14	0	6	25	7	18	.232	
José Bautista	157	587	92	119	27	0	23	65	6	84	.203	
Joe Biagini	44	2	0	0	0	0	0	1	0	0	.000	
Ezequiel Carrera	131	287	38	81	10	1	8	20	10	30	.282	
Darrell Ceciliani	3	5	2	2	1	0	1	3	0	0	.400	
Chris Coghlan	36	75	7	15	2	0	1	5	0	9	.200	
Josh Donaldson	113	415	65	112	21	0	33	78	2	76	.270	
Marco Estrada	33	4	0	0	0	0	0	0	0	0	.000	
Ryan Goins	143	418	37	99	21	1	9	62	3	31	.237	
J. A. Happ	25	2	0	0	0	0	0	0	0	0	.000	
Teoscar Hernández	26	88	15	23	6	0	8	20	0	6	.261	
Mat Latos	3	3	0	0	0	0	0	0	0	0	.000	
Casey Lawrence	4	1	0	0	0	0	0	0	0	0	.000	
Raffy Lopez	24	54	9	12	1	0	4	12	0	7	.222	
Luke Maile	46	130	10	19	5	0	2	7	1	3	.146	
Russell Martin	91	307	49	68	12	0	13	35	1	50	.221	
Miguel Montero	32	87	12	12	3	0	2	8	0	12	.138	
Kendrys Morales	150	557	67	139	25	0	28	85	0	43	.250	
Mike Ohlman	7	13	1	3	0	0	0	1	0	0	.231	
Ian Parmley	3	3	0	0	0	0	0	0	0	0	.000	
Steve Pearce	92	313	38	79	17	1	13	37	0	27	.252	
Kevin Pillar	154	587	72	150	37	1	16	42	15	33	.256	
Rob Refsnyder	32	51	5	10	1	0	0	0	2	5	.196	
Jarrod Saltalamacchia	10	25	1	1	0	0	0	0	0	1	.040	
Michael Saunders	12	18	1	3	0	0	0	1	0	2	.167	
Dwight Smith Jr.	12	27	2	10	2	0	0	1	1	1	.370	
Justin Smoak	158	560	85	151	29	1	38	90	0	73	.270	
Marcus Stroman	33	7	2	2	1	0	1	1	0	0	.286	
Ryan Tepera	73	1	0	0	0	0	0	0	0	0	.000	
Nick Tepesch	3	2	0	0	0	0	0	0	0	0	.000	
Devon Travis	50	185	22	48	18	0	5	24	4	7	.259	
Troy Tulowitzki	66	241	16	60	10	0	7	26	0	17	.249	
Richard Ureña	21	68	6	14	4	0	1	4	1	6	.206	
Team totals	162	5499	693	1320	269	5	222	661	53	542	.240	

=== Pitching ===
Note: G = Games pitched; GS = Games started; W = Wins; L = Losses; SV = Saves; ERA = Earned run average; WHIP = Walks+hits per inning pitched; IP = Innings pitched; H = Hits allowed; R = Total runs allowed; ER = Earned runs allowed; BB = Walks allowed; K = Strikeouts; Ref. = Reference

Player	G	GS	W	L	SV	ERA	WHIP	IP	H	R	ER	BB	K	Ref.
Brett Anderson	7	7	2	2	0	5.13	1.44	33 1/3	39	19	19	9	22	
Danny Barnes	60	0	3	6	0	3.55	1.09	66	48	26	26	24	62	
Jeff Beliveau	19	0	1	1	0	7.47	1.47	15 2/3	17	14	13	6	17	
Joe Biagini	44	18	3	13	1	5.34	1.40	119 2/3	125	78	71	42	97	
Mike Bolsinger	11	5	0	3	0	6.31	1.81	41 1/3	48	32	29	27	39	
Leonel Campos	13	0	0	0	0	2.63	1.39	13 2/3	11	6	4	8	15	
Taylor Cole	1	0	0	0	0	36.00	7.00	1	6	4	4	1	1	
Matt Dermody	23	0	2	0	0	4.43	1.25	22 1/3	23	13	11	5	15	
Marco Estrada	33	33	10	9	0	4.98	1.38	186	186	104	103	71	176	
Jason Grilli	26	0	2	4	1	6.97	1.60	20 2/3	24	17	16	9	23	
J. A. Happ	25	25	10	11	0	3.53	1.31	145 1/3	145	64	57	46	142	
Lucas Harrell	4	0	0	0	0	7.11	2.21	6 1/3	10	5	5	4	6	
TJ House	2	0	0	0	0	4.50	2.00	2	3	1	1	1	1	
J. P. Howell	16	0	1	1	0	7.36	1.82	11	13	9	9	7	6	
Tom Koehler	15	1	0	2	0	2.65	1.29	17	16	5	5	6	18	
Mat Latos	3	3	0	1	0	6.60	1.80	15	19	11	11	8	10	
Casey Lawrence	4	2	0	3	0	8.78	2.40	13 1/3	21	14	13	11	7	
Dominic Leone	65	0	3	0	1	2.56	1.05	70 1/3	51	22	20	23	81	
Francisco Liriano	18	18	6	5	0	5.88	1.62	82 2/3	91	57	54	43	74	
Aaron Loup	70	0	2	3	0	3.75	1.53	57 2/3	59	27	24	29	64	
Tim Mayza	19	0	1	0	0	6.88	1.65	17	24	15	13	4	27	
Roberto Osuna	66	0	3	4	39	3.38	0.86	64	46	26	24	9	83	
Carlos Ramírez	12	0	0	0	0	2.70	0.54	16 2/3	6	5	5	3	14	
Chris Rowley	6	3	1	2	0	6.75	1.82	18 2/3	24	14	14	10	11	
Aaron Sanchez	8	8	1	3	0	4.25	1.72	36	42	24	17	20	24	
Luis Santos	10	0	0	1	1	2.70	1.08	16 2/3	14	5	5	4	16	
Chris Smith	4	0	0	0	0	5.40	1.60	5	7	3	3	1	1	
Joe Smith	38	0	3	0	0	3.28	1.12	35 2/3	30	13	13	10	51	
Glenn Sparkman	2	0	0	0	0	63.00	10.00	1	9	7	7	1	1	
Marcus Stroman	33	33	13	9	0	3.09	1.31	201	201	82	69	62	164	
Ryan Tepera	73	0	7	1	2	3.59	1.13	77 2/3	57	35	31	31	81	
Nick Tepesch	3	3	1	1	0	5.14	1.71	14	17	8	8	7	7	
César Valdez	7	3	1	1	0	6.75	1.59	21 1/3	27	19	16	7	16	
Team totals	162	162	76	86	45	4.42	1.37	1465	1460	784	720	549	1372	

== Awards ==
Recipient	Award	Date awarded	Ref.
Justin Smoak	All-Star	July 2, 2017	
Roberto Osuna	American League Reliever of the Month	July 3, 2017	
Roberto Osuna	All-Star	July 7, 2017	
Marcus Stroman	Gold Glove	November 7, 2017	

== Transactions ==
=== April ===
- On April 2, placed Bo Schultz, Glenn Sparkman, Dalton Pompey, and Roberto Osuna on the 10-day disabled list, designated Mike Bolsinger for assignment, released Melvin Upton Jr., recalled Dominic Leone, and selected the contract of Jarrod Saltalamacchia.
- On April 6, outrighted Mike Bolsinger to Triple-A Buffalo, and claimed Luke Maile off waivers from the Tampa Bay Rays.
- On April 8, optioned Dominic Leone to Triple-A Buffalo, transferred Bo Schultz to the 60-day disabled list, and selected the contract of Casey Lawrence.
- On April 9, placed J. P. Howell on the 10-day disabled list, and recalled Dominic Leone.
- On April 10, claimed Ty Kelly off waivers from the New York Mets, and transferred Glenn Sparkman to the 60-day disabled list.
- On April 11, activated Roberto Osuna and optioned Casey Lawrence.
- On April 14, placed Josh Donaldson on the 10-day disabled list, designated Juan Graterol for assignment, and selected the contract of Chris Coghlan.
- On April 16, placed Aaron Sanchez on the 10-day disabled list and recalled Matt Dermody.
- On April 18, placed J. A. Happ on the 10-day disabled list, optioned Matt Dermody, recalled Danny Barnes and Ty Kelly, and traded Juan Graterol to the Los Angeles Angles of Anaheim for cash considerations or a player to be named later.
- On April 20, sent J. P. Howell on a rehab assignment to the Advanced-A Dunedin Blue Jays.
- On April 21, designated Ty Kelly for assignment, and selected the contract of Mat Latos.
- On April 22, optioned Danny Barnes, recalled Leonel Campos and Casey Lawrence, and traded Ty Kelly to the Philadelphia Phillies for cash considerations.
- On April 23, placed Troy Tulowitzki on the 10-day disabled list, and transferred Dalton Pompey to the 60-day disabled list.
- On April 25, activated J. P. Howell and optioned Leonel Campos.
- On April 27, recalled Danny Barnes.
- On April 28, designated Jarrod Saltalamacchia for assignment, optioned Danny Barnes and Casey Lawrence, and recalled Luke Maile and Matt Dermody.
- On April 30, activated Aaron Sanchez and optioned Matt Dermody.

=== May ===
- On May 1, placed Aaron Sanchez on the 10-day disabled list and recalled Danny Barnes.
- On May 3, released Jarrod Saltalamacchia.
- On May 4, claimed Neil Ramirez off waivers from the San Francisco Giants.
- On May 5, designated Mat Latos for assignment, and claimed César Valdez off waivers from the Oakland Athletics.
- On May 8, placed Russell Martin on the 10-day disabled list, outrighted Mat Latos to Triple-A Buffalo, designated Casey Lawrence for assignment, and selected the contract of Mike Ohlman.
- On May 9, designated Neil Ramirez for assignment, and selected the contract of Mike Bolsinger.
- On May 11, placed Francisco Liriano on the 10-day disabled list, and recalled Leonel Campos.
- On May 13, outrighted Neil Ramirez to Triple-A Buffalo.
- On May 14, activated Aaron Sanchez and optioned Leonel Campos.
- On May 15, placed Steve Pearce on the 10-day disabled list, recalled Leonel Campos, and sent Troy Tulowitzki on a rehab assignment to the Advanced-A Dunedin Blue Jays.
- On May 16, signed Jarrod Saltalamacchia to a minor league contract, optioned Leonel Campos, and recalled Darrell Ceciliani.
- On May 18, suspended Kevin Pillar for two games, and selected the contract of Dwight Smith Jr.
- On May 19, placed Darrell Ceciliani on the 10-day disabled list, and recalled Anthony Alford.
- On May 20, activated Russell Martin and Kevin Pillar, placed Aaron Sanchez on the 10-day disabled list, designated Mike Ohlman for assignment, optioned Dwight Smith Jr., and recalled César Valdez.
- On May 22, sent Josh Donaldson on a rehab assignment to the Advanced-A Dunedin Blue Jays.
- On May 23, outrighted Mike Ohlman to Triple-A Buffalo.
- On May 24, placed Anthony Alford on the 10-day disabled list, and recalled Dwight Smith Jr.
- On May 25, optioned Dwight Smith Jr., and sent J. A. Happ on a rehab assignment to the Advanced-A Dunedin Blue Jays.
- On May 26, activated Josh Donaldson and Troy Tulowitzki, and optioned César Valdez.
- On May 28, sent Francisco Liriano on a rehab assignment to the Triple-A Buffalo Bisons.
- On May 30, activated J. A. Happ, and optioned Dominic Leone.

=== June ===
- On June 1, designated Mike Bolsinger for assignment, recalled Leonel Campos, and sent Glenn Sparkman on a rehab assignment to the Advanced-A Dunedin Blue Jays.
- On June 2, activated Francisco Liriano and optioned Leonel Campos.
- On June 4, sent Dalton Pompey on a rehab assignment to the Triple-A Buffalo Bisons.
- On June 5, placed J. P. Howell on the 10-day disabled list and selected the contract of Jeff Beliveau.
- On June 6, placed Devon Travis on the 10-day disabled list and recalled Dominic Leone.
- On June 7, outrighted Mike Bolsinger to Triple-A Buffalo, and sent Glenn Sparkman on a rehab assignment to the Double-A New Hampshire Fisher Cats.
- On June 8, sent Steve Pearce on a rehab assignment to the Double-A New Hampshire Fisher Cats.
- On June 13, sent Steve Pearce on a rehab assignment to the Triple-A Buffalo Bisons.
- On June 14, placed Ezequiel Carrera on the 10-day disabled list and recalled Dwight Smith Jr.
- On June 16, placed Chris Coghlan on the 10-day disabled list and activated Steve Pearce.
- On June 18, sent Glenn Sparkman on a rehab assignment to the Triple-A Buffalo Bisons, and traded Jarrett Grube to the Cleveland Indians for cash considerations.
- On June 19, placed Joe Smith on the 10-day disabled list and recalled Leonel Campos.
- On June 21, placed Leonel Campos on the 10-day disabled list and recalled César Valdez.
- On June 23, optioned César Valdez and selected the contract of Ian Parmley.
- On June 26, sent Ezequiel Carrera on a rehab assignment to the Triple-A Buffalo Bisons.
- On June 27, designated Jason Grilli for assignment, optioned Dwight Smith Jr., activated Ezequiel Carrera, recalled Chris Smith, and sent Aaron Sanchez on a rehab assignment to the Advanced-A Dunedin Blue Jays.
- On June 29, sent Dalton Pompey on a rehab assignment to the Advanced-A Dunedin Blue Jays.
- On June 30, optioned Chris Smith, activated Glenn Sparkman, and transferred Devon Travis to the 60-day disabled list.

=== July ===
- On July 1, sent Aaron Sanchez on a rehab assignment to the Triple-A Buffalo Bisons, designated Ian Parmley for assignment, and selected the contract of Lucas Harrell.
- On July 2, traded Jason Grilli to the Texas Rangers for Eduard Pinto.
- On July 3, designated Glenn Sparkman for assignment, selected the contract of Mike Bolsinger, and traded cash considerations or a player to be named later to the Chicago Cubs for Miguel Montero.
- On July 4, placed Luke Maile on the 10-day disabled list, activated Miguel Montero, and sent Dalton Pompey on a rehab assignment to the Triple-A Buffalo Bisons.
- On July 6, sent J. P. Howell on a rehab assignment to the Triple-A Buffalo Bisons.
- On July 7, optioned Dominic Leone and activated Aaron Sanchez.
- On July 8, returned Glenn Sparkman to the Kansas City Royals.
- On July 12, sent Anthony Alford on a rehab assignment to the Advanced-A Dunedin Blue Jays.
- On July 14, sent Joe Smith on a rehab assignment to the Triple-A Buffalo Bisons.
- On July 17, designated Lucas Harrell for assignment and recalled Dominic Leone.
- On July 19, placed Mike Bolsinger on the 10-day disabled list, and recalled César Valdez.
- On July 20, sent Darrell Ceciliani on a rehab assignment to the Advanced-A Dunedin Blue Jays.
- On July 22, placed Aaron Sanchez on the 10-day disabled list, designated Jeff Beliveau for assignment, activated Joe Smith, and recalled Chris Smith.
- On July 23, acquired Rob Refsnyder from the New York Yankees for Ryan McBroom.
- On July 24, acquired Nick Tepesch from the Minnesota Twins for cash considerations.
- On July 25, placed Danny Barnes on the 10-day disabled list, recalled Matt Dermody, outrighted Jeff Beliveau, and activated and optioned Anthony Alford.
- On July 27, sent Leonel Campos on a rehab assignment to the Advanced-A Dunedin Blue Jays.
- On July 28, sent Darrell Ceciliani on a rehab assignment to the Triple-A Buffalo Bisons.
- On July 29, placed Troy Tulowitzki on the 10-day disabled list, activated Mike Bolsinger, optioned Chris Smith, and recalled Rob Refsnyder.
- On July 30, sent Leonel Campos on a rehab assignment to the Triple-A Buffalo Bisons.
- On July 31, activated J. P. Howell, selected the contract of Brett Oberholtzer, traded Francisco Liriano to the Houston Astros for Nori Aoki and Teoscar Hernández, and traded Joe Smith to the Cleveland Indians for Thomas Pannone and Samad Taylor.

=== August ===
- On August 1, activated Nori Aoki and designated Brett Oberholtzer for assignment.
- On August 2, activated and optioned Leonel Campos.
- On August 3, outrighted Brett Oberholtzer to Triple-A Buffalo.
- On August 4, optioned Joe Biagini, placed Miguel Montero on the 10-day disabled list, activated Danny Barnes, and selected the contract of Raffy Lopez.
- On August 5, designated Mike Bolsinger for assignment and selected the contract of Taylor Cole.
- On August 7, sent Chris Coghlan on a rehab assignment to the Advanced-A Dunedin Blue Jays.
- On August 8, placed César Valdez on the 10-day disabled list and recalled Leonel Campos.
- On August 9, transferred Troy Tulowitzki to the 60-day disabled list, optioned Matt Dermody, and selected the contract of Nick Tepesch.
- On August 10, placed Taylor Cole on the 10-day disabled list and recalled Chris Smith.
- On August 12, designated Chris Coghlan and Chris Smith for assignment, placed Russell Martin on the 10-day disabled list, and selected the contracts of Mike Ohlman and Chris Rowley.
- On August 13, placed Dominic Leone on the bereavement list and recalled Matt Dermody.
- On August 14, optioned Leonel Campos, released Taylor Cole, and selected the contract of Tim Mayza.
- On August 15, sent Miguel Montero on a rehab assignment to the Triple-A Buffalo Bisons.
- On August 16, designated J. P. Howell and Mike Ohlman for assignment, and activated Dominic Leone and Miguel Montero.
- On August 17, sent Luke Maile on a rehab assignment to the Advanced-A Dunedin Blue Jays.
- On August 19, optioned Tim Mayza, selected the contract of TJ House, and traded Osman Gutierrez to the Miami Marlins for Tom Koehler.
- On August 20, optioned Tom Koehler, and released J. P. Howell.
- On August 22, placed Nick Tepesch on the paternity list and recalled Tim Mayza.
- On August 24, optioned Chris Rowley and recalled Tom Koehler.
- On August 25, sent Luke Maile on a rehab assignment to the Triple-A Buffalo Bisons, and optioned Nick Tepesch.
- On August 27, designated TJ House for assignment, and recalled Joe Biagini.
- On August 28, designated Nori Aoki for assignment, and recalled Leonel Campos.
- On August 29, optioned Leonel Campos, selected the contract of Brett Anderson, and released Nori Aoki.

=== September ===
- On September 1, activated Luke Maile, selected the contracts of Carlos Ramírez and Michael Saunders, and recalled Teoscar Hernández and Richard Ureña.
- On September 2, designated Nick Tepesch for assignment and selected the contract of Luis Santos.
- On September 3, recalled Chris Rowley.
- On September 8, transferred César Valdez to the 60-day disabled list, and recalled Leonel Campos.
- On September 9, outrighted Nick Tepesch to Triple-A Buffalo.
- On September 12, activated Russell Martin.
- On September 29, transferred Aaron Sanchez to the 60-day disabled list, and selected the contract of Taylor Cole.

== Farm system ==
Level	Team	League	Manager	Win–loss record	Position	Postseason	Ref.
Triple-A	Buffalo Bisons	International League	Bobby Meacham	65–76	North Division; 5th place 21 GB	Did not qualify	
Double-A	New Hampshire Fisher Cats	Eastern League	Gary Allenson	59–80	East Division; 6th place 32½ GB	Did not qualify	
Advanced-A	Dunedin Blue Jays	Florida State League	John Schneider	34–35 (first half); 38–31 (second half)	North Division; 4th place (first half); 4½ GB; 2nd place (second half); 10 GB	Won SF 2–1; Final Cancelled; Won League; Co-Championship (Note: The impending threat of Hurricane Irma forced the cancellation of the league's championship series. Dunedin was named co-champions with the Palm Beach Cardinals)	
Class-A	Lansing Lugnuts	Midwest League	Cesar Martin	37–29 (first half); 26–44 (second half)	East Division; 4th place (first half); 7½ GB; 8th place (second half); 20½ GB	Did not qualify	
Short Season-A	Vancouver Canadians	Northwest League	Rich Miller	21–17 (first half); 22–16 (second half)	North Division; 1st place (first half); 2nd place (second half); 1 GB	Won SF 2–0; Won F 3–1; Won League Championship	
Rookie Advanced	Bluefield Blue Jays	Appalachian League	Dennis Holmberg	46–22	East Division; 1st place	1–2; Lost East Division finals	
Rookie	GCL Blue Jays	Gulf Coast League	Luis Hurtado	35–25	Northwest Division; 2nd place 2 GB	Did not qualify	
Rookie	DSL Blue Jays	Dominican Summer League	John Tamargo Jr.	44–26	Baseball City Division; 1st place	1–3; Lost semi-final B	
