= Richard Ureña =

Dominican baseball player (born 1996)

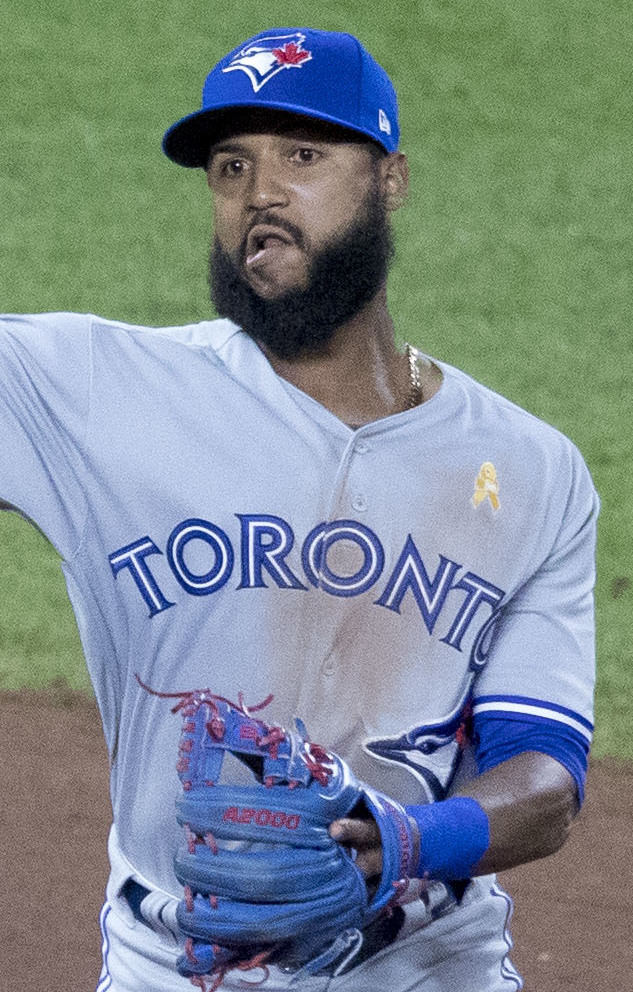
- Ureña with the Toronto Blue Jays in 2017
- Shortstop
- Born: February 26, 1996 (age 30); San Francisco de Macorís, Duarte, Dominican Republic
- Batted: Switch Threw: Right

MLB debut
- September 1, 2017, for the Toronto Blue Jays

Last MLB appearance
- September 29, 2019, for the Toronto Blue Jays

MLB statistics
- Batting average: .253
- Home runs: 2
- Runs batted in: 14
- Stats at Baseball Reference

Teams
- Toronto Blue Jays (2017–2019)

Richard Ureña Castillo (born February 26, 1996) is a Dominican former professional baseball shortstop. He has previously played in Major League Baseball (MLB) for the Toronto Blue Jays.

== Professional career ==
=== Toronto Blue Jays ===
Ureña was signed as an international free agent by the Blue Jays for $725,000 in 2012, and played his first professional season split between the Dominican Summer League Blue Jays and Gulf Coast League Blue Jays. In 64 games with the DSL Blue Jays, he batted.296 with one home run and 35 runs batted in (RBI). He then played seven games in the Gulf Coast League, batting.333 with three RBI. Ureña was promoted to the Rookie Advanced Bluefield Blue Jays of the Appalachian League for the start of the 2014 season, and recorded a 28-game streak of reaching base safely. In 53 games, he hit.318 with two home runs and 20 RBI before he was promoted to the Low–A Vancouver Canadians on August 21. Ureña appeared in nine games for Vancouver, batting .242 with five RBI. On September 24, Ureña was named the Most Valuable Player for Bluefield in 2014. He began the 2015 season with the Single–A Lansing Lugnuts. On June 5, Ureña was named a Midwest League midseason All-Star. At that time, he led the Lugnuts with seven home runs, and had 35 RBI. Ureña was called up to the High–A Dunedin Blue Jays in early July, and played 30 games there before returning to Lansing. In 121 games played, he batted .262 with 16 home runs and 66 RBI. In the offseason, he appeared in 33 games with the Gigantes del Cibao of the Dominican Winter League. Batting against pitchers that were over seven years of age older than him on average, Ureña hit .258 with five RBI.

Ureña was invited to Major League spring training on January 12, 2016, and reassigned to minor league camp on March 12. He was assigned to the Dunedin Blue Jays to open the 2016 minor league season. Ureña recorded his first career five-hit game on July 9 which gave him 91 hits on the season, raising his batting average to .292 and tying him with Scott Kingery for first place in the Florida State League. On July 27, Ureña was ranked 91st on MLB's Top 100 Prospects list, and was named the Blue Jays top prospect. He was promoted to the Double-A New Hampshire Fisher Cats on August 3, and had three hits in his debut that day. On August 10, Ureña hit three triples against the Bowie Baysox, which set a Fisher Cats single-game record. In 127 games in 2016, he hit .295 with eight home runs and 59 RBI. The Blue Jays added him to their 40-man roster after the season. Ureña spent the entire 2017 minor league season with Double-A New Hampshire, and hit .247 with five home runs and 60 RBI in a career-high 129 games played.

Following his September callup to the Blue Jays in the previous season, Ureña was assigned to the Triple-A Buffalo Bisons to start the 2018 season. However, due to an intercostal strain which included a rehab assignment with the Dunedin Blue Jays, he did not join the Bisons until May 2.

==== Major Leagues ====
On August 31, 2017, Blue Jays' manager John Gibbons announced that Ureña would be called up on September 1. Ureña hit his first MLB home run on September 8, in Toronto's 5–4 loss to the Detroit Tigers. On September 12, he walked off the Baltimore Orioles, hitting an RBI single off closer Zach Britton to give the Blue Jays a 3–2 victory. Ureña played in 21 games for Toronto in his rookie campaign, batting .206/.270/.309 with one home run and four RBI.

Ureña made 40 appearances for Toronto in 2018, slashing .293/.340/.364 with one home run, six RBI, and two stolen bases. He played in 30 contests for the Blue Jays in 2019, hitting .243/.273/.324 with four RBI. On December 30, 2019, Ureña was designated for assignment following the signing of Travis Shaw.

On January 10, 2020, Ureña was claimed off waivers by the Baltimore Orioles. Ureña was designated for assignment following the acquisition of Andrew Velazquez on February 19. He did not play in a game in 2020 due to the cancellation of the minor league season because of the COVID-19 pandemic. He became a free agent on November 2.

On December 18, 2020, Ureña signed a minor league contract with the Blue Jays organization.

=== Washington Nationals ===
On November 28, 2021, Ureña signed a minor league contract with the Washington Nationals. He was assigned to the Triple-A Rochester Red Wings to begin the 2022 season. After appearing in 37 games and hitting .231/.268/.321 with 2 home runs and 21 RBI, Ureña was released on August 9, 2022.

=== York Revolution ===
On March 7, 2023, Ureña signed with the York Revolution of the Atlantic League of Professional Baseball. In 103 games for York, Ureña hit .269/.315/.462 with 18 home runs and 64 RBI.

=== Dorados de Chihuahua ===
On February 14, 2024, Ureña signed with the Dorados de Chihuahua of the Mexican League. However, he was released prior to the start of the season on April 10.
