= Leonel Campos =

Venezuelan baseball pitcher (born 1987)

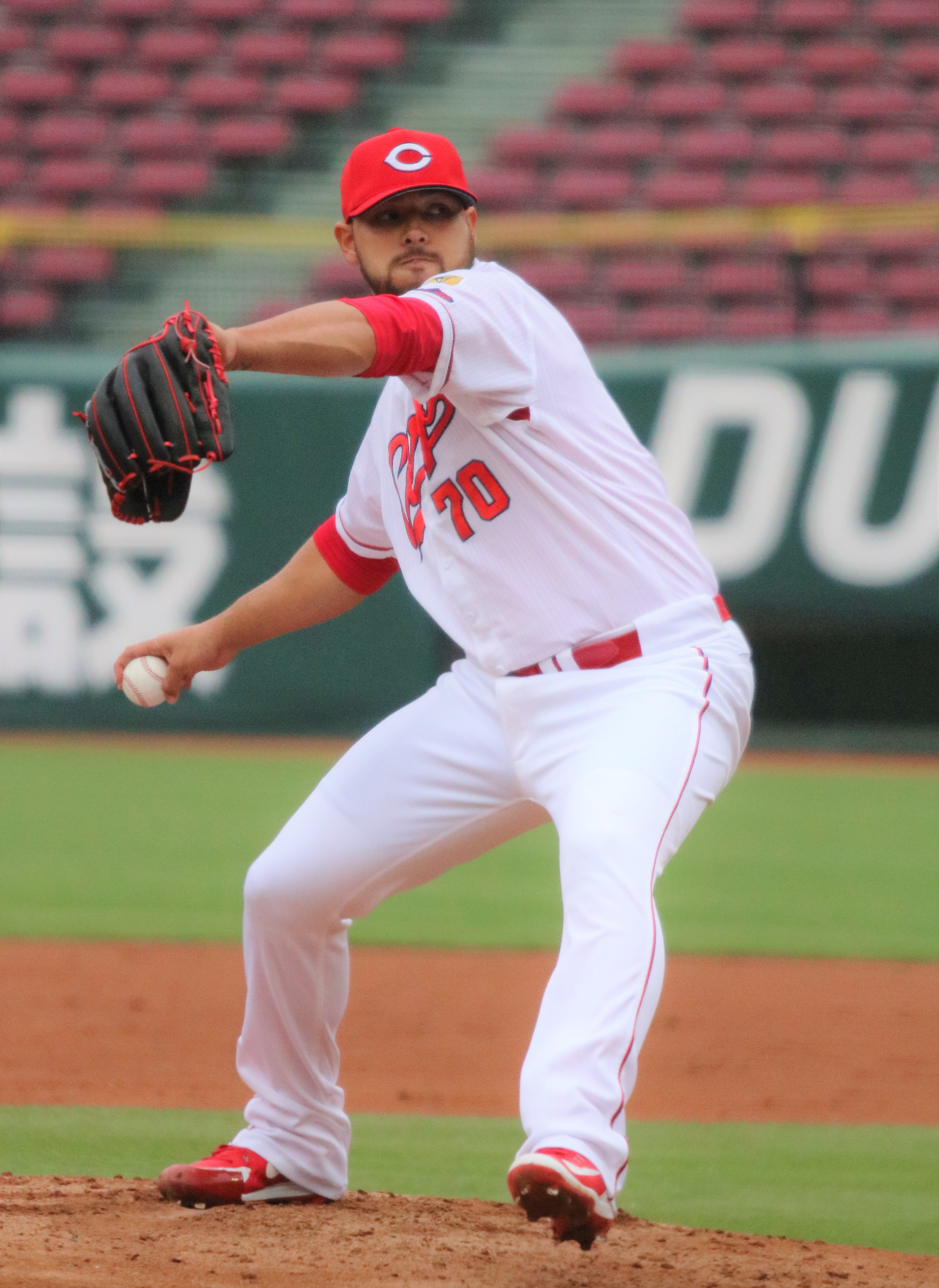
- Campos with the Carp in 2018

Delfines de La Guaira – No. 57
- Pitcher
- Born: July 17, 1987 (age 39); Valera, Trujillo, Venezuela
- Batted: Right Threw: Right

Professional debut
- MLB: September 3, 2014, for the San Diego Padres
- NPB: May 22, 2018, for the Hiroshima Toyo Carp

Last appearance
- MLB: September 20, 2017, for the Toronto Blue Jays
- NPB: May 22, 2018, for the Hiroshima Toyo Carp

MLB statistics
- Win–loss record: 1–0
- Earned run average: 4.74
- Strikeouts: 49

NPB statistics
- Win–loss record: 0–0
- Earned run average: 0.00
- Strikeouts: 0
- Stats at Baseball Reference

Teams
- San Diego Padres (2014–2016); Toronto Blue Jays (2017); Hiroshima Toyo Carp (2018)
Medals
Men's baseball
Representing Venezuela
South American Games
Gold medal – first place	2010 Medellín	Team
Bolivarian Games
Silver medal – second place	2009 Sucre	Team

Leonel Enrique Campos Linares (born July 17, 1987) is a Venezuelan professional baseball pitcher for the Delfines de La Guaira of the Venezuelan Major League. He played in Major League Baseball (MLB) for the San Diego Padres and Toronto Blue Jays and in Nippon Professional Baseball (NPB) for the Hiroshima Toyo Carp.

== Professional career ==
=== San Diego Padres ===
==== Minor leagues ====
Campos began his professional baseball career as a member of the Águilas del Zulia of the Venezuelan Winter League in 2010. In 4 2/3 innings pitched, Campos posted a 7.71 earned run average (ERA) and five strikeouts. In 2011, he signed with the San Diego Padres organization and was assigned to the Low-A Eugene Emeralds. Campos made only one appearance for the Emeralds in 2011, surrendering four earned runs in two innings. It was later determined that Campos required Tommy John surgery, and he subsequently missed the entire 2012 season recovering. He was assigned to the Single-A Fort Wayne TinCaps to open the 2013 season, and later earned a promotion to the Double-A San Antonio Missions. In 67 total innings, Campos pitched to a 3–1 win–loss record, 1.61 ERA, and 106 strikeouts.

Campos began the 2014 season in Triple-A with the El Paso Chihuahuas. but was sent back to Double-A in May. He remained with the Missions until the end of the minor league season, and finished the year with a 2–7 record, 6.37 ERA, and 108 strikeouts in 82 total innings.

==== Major leagues ====
Following the completion of the minor league season, Campos was called up by the Padres on September 1, 2014. He made his major league debut on September 3, and made six total appearances for the Padres in September, allowing four earned runs in seven innings. Campos spent the vast majority of the 2015 season in Triple-A El Paso, making only one appearance with the Padres. With the Chihuahuas, Campos pitched to a 2–0 record, 2.90 ERA, and 68 strikeouts in 49 2/3 innings. In his one relief appearance for the Padres, Campos allowed one earned run in one inning.

Campos opened the 2016 season in El Paso, and was called up by the Padres in September. He posted a 2–1 record, 4.32 ERA, and 62 strikeouts in 50 total innings with the Chihuahuas, and a 1–0 record, 5.73 ERA, and 24 strikeouts in 22 innings with the Padres.

=== Toronto Blue Jays ===
On November 18, 2016, Campos was claimed off waivers by the Toronto Blue Jays. They designated him for assignment on January 23, 2017. Campos cleared waivers and was outrighted to the Triple-A Buffalo Bisons on January 27. He was called up by the Blue Jays on April 22, and sent back down on April 25. He was outrighted to Triple-A on November 6, 2017, and elected free agency the following day.

=== Hiroshima Toyo Carp ===
On November 22, 2017, Campos was signed by the Cleveland Indians to a minor league contract with a non-roster invitation to the club's 2018 spring training camp. The Indians granted Campos his release on December 20, and he signed a one-year, $400,000 contract with the Hiroshima Toyo Carp later that day. Campos played only one game and was sent down to the minor league Toyota Carp in the Western League at Iwakuni. On November 20, 2018, Campos became a free agent.

=== Bravos de León ===
On July 10, 2021, Campos signed with the Bravos de León of the Mexican League. He was released following the season on October 20, 2021.

=== Marineros de Carabobo ===
In 2025, Campos signed with the Marineros de Carabobo of the Venezuelan Major League.

=== Delfines de La Guaira ===
On April 9, 2026, Campos signed with the Delfines de La Guaira of the Venezuelan Major League.

== See also ==
- List of Major League Baseball players from Venezuela
