= Carlos Ramírez (baseball) =

Dominican baseball player (born 1991)

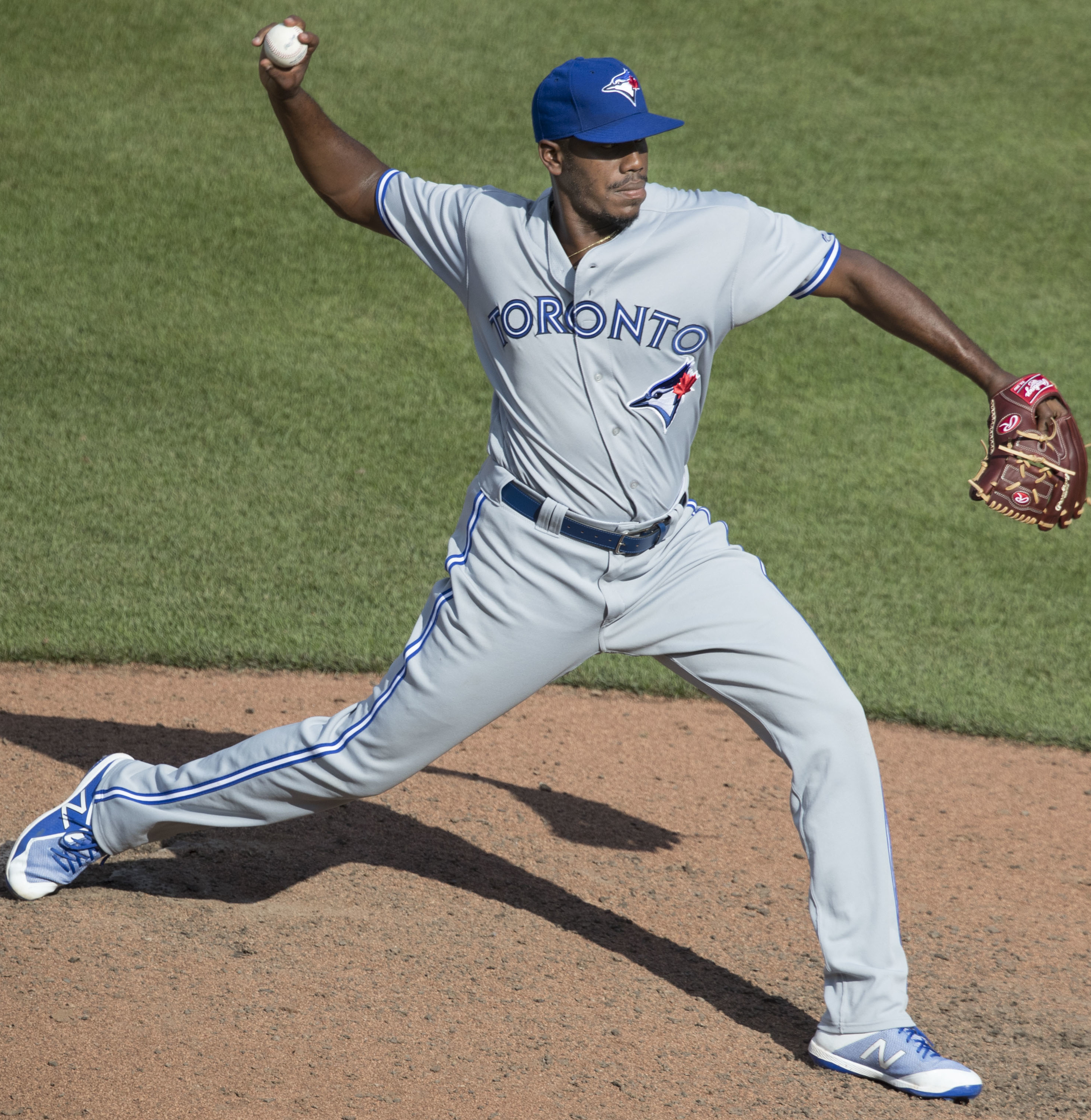
- Ramírez with the Toronto Blue Jays in 2017
- Pitcher
- Born: April 24, 1991 (age 34); Santo Domingo, Dominican Republic
- Batted: Right Threw: Right

MLB debut
- September 1, 2017, for the Toronto Blue Jays

Last MLB appearance
- June 15, 2018, for the Oakland Athletics

MLB statistics
- Win–loss record: 0–0
- Earned run average: 2.88
- Strikeouts: 19
- Stats at Baseball Reference

Teams
- Toronto Blue Jays (2017–2018); Oakland Athletics (2018)

Carlos Alejandro Ramírez (born April 24, 1991) is a Dominican former professional baseball pitcher. He played in Major League Baseball (MLB) for the Toronto Blue Jays and Oakland Athletics.

== Professional career ==
=== Toronto Blue Jays ===
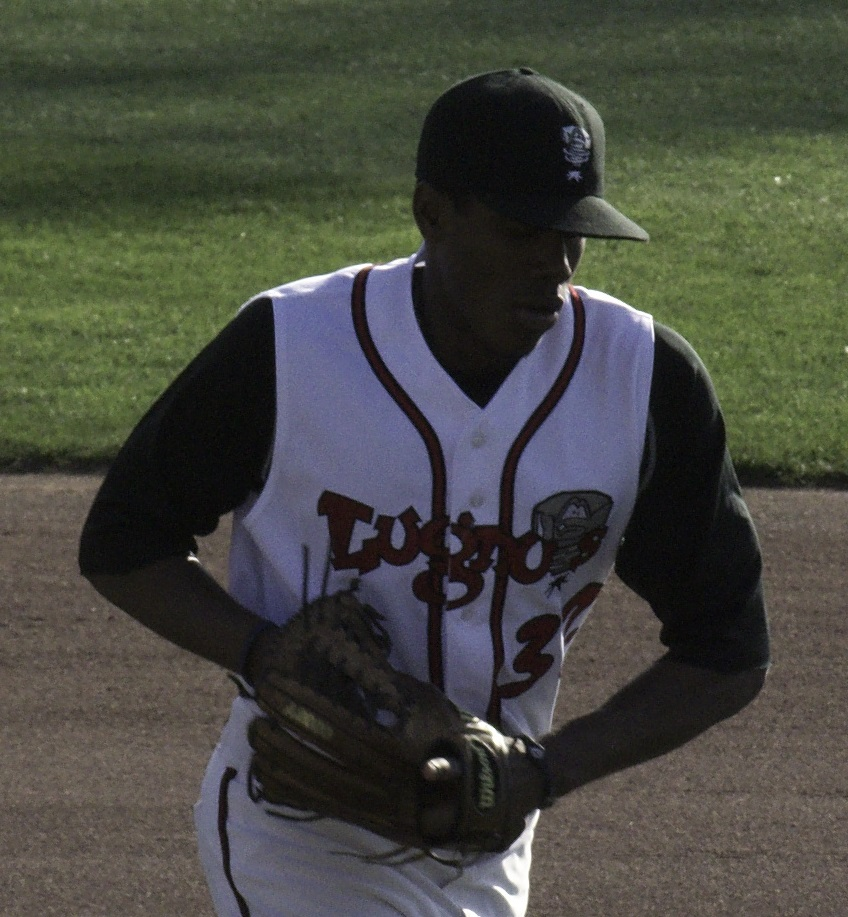
Ramírez with the Lansing Lugnuts in 2013

The Blue Jays signed Ramírez as an international free agent outfielder on March 5, 2009, and assigned him to the Dominican Summer League Blue Jays. In 52 games, he recorded a .229 batting average, three home runs, and 14 runs batted in (RBI). Ramírez played the entire 2010 season with the Rookie-level Gulf Coast League Blue Jays, appearing in 47 games and hitting .205 with two home runs and 12 RBI. He continued to progress through the Blue Jays' minor league system, playing 40 games for the Rookie Advanced Bluefield Blue Jays of the Appalachian League in 2011. He hit .232 with two home runs and nine RBI on the season. Ramírez began the 2012 campaign with Bluefield, and was promoted to the Short Season-A Vancouver Canadians in July. He appeared in 52 total games and hit .250 with three home runs and 25 RBI. In 2013, Ramírez made his full-season baseball debut with the Class-A Lansing Lugnuts, where he appeared in a career-high 114 games and hit .228 with seven home runs, 41 RBI, and 14 stolen bases. In the offseason, Ramírez played in five games with the Leones del Escogido of the Dominican Winter League.

Ramírez began the 2014 season with Lansing, hitting .176 through his first 28 games. In May, it was suggested that he switch positions from outfielder to pitcher, and was sent to extended spring training to work with Dane Johnson. Ramírez was assigned to Bluefield on June 17, and spent the remainder of 2014 pitching out of the bullpen there. In 17 appearances, Ramírez posted a 1–0 win–loss record, 2.62 earned run average (ERA), and 24 strikeouts in 34 1/3 innings. He was assigned to Class-A Lansing to begin the 2015 season, and was promoted to the Advanced-A Dunedin Blue Jays in May. After struggling with Dunedin, Ramírez was moved back to Lansing in June, where he finished the year. He made 34 total relief appearances in 2015, and pitched to a 2–3 record, eight saves, a 4.76 ERA, and 37 strikeouts in 39 2/3 innings. He elected free agency after the season, but re-signed with the Blue Jays on November 21. Ramírez spent the entire 2016 season with Dunedin, appearing in 30 games and posted a 3–0 record, 2.20 ERA, 41 strikeouts, and nine saves in 41 total innings. He opened the 2017 season with the Double-A New Hampshire Fisher Cats, where he did not allow an earned run in 23 2/3 relief innings. In August, Ramírez was promoted to the Triple-A Buffalo Bisons, where he added another 14 innings without allowing an earned run.

On August 31, 2017, Blue Jays' manager John Gibbons announced that Ramírez would be promoted to the major leagues for the first time on September 1. He made his debut that night, pitching two scoreless relief innings in Toronto's 1–0 loss to the Baltimore Orioles. Ramírez made 12 appearances for Toronto in 2017, posting a 2.70 ERA with 14 strikeouts. He began the 2018 season with Triple-A Buffalo before being designated for assignment on May 13, 2018.

=== Oakland Athletics ===
On May 20, 2018, Ramírez was claimed off waivers by the Oakland Athletics and was assigned to the Triple-A Nashville Sounds. Ramírez recorded a 3.00 ERA in 3 games with Oakland, but was designated for assignment on August 1. Ramírez finished the season with Triple-A Nashville, where he logged a 3.10 ERA in 26 appearances. On November 2, Ramírez elected free agency.

=== New Britain Bees ===
On December 18, 2018, Ramírez signed a minor league deal with the Chicago Cubs organization. He was released before the season on March 24, 2019.

On June 4, 2019, Ramírez signed with the New Britain Bees of the Atlantic League of Professional Baseball. Ramírez made 6 appearances for the Bees, but struggled to a 8.53 ERA in 6 games. He became a free agent after the season.

=== Leones de Yucatán ===
On May 20, 2021, Ramírez signed with the Leones de Yucatán of the Mexican League. Ramírez recorded a 1.64 ERA in 10 appearances with Yucatán, but was released by the team on June 28.

=== Algodoneros de Unión Laguna ===
On July 16, 2021, Ramírez signed with the Algodoneros de Unión Laguna of the Mexican League. In 9 games for Unión Laguna, he logged a 2.70 ERA with 6 strikeouts across 10 innings of work. Ramírez was released by the team on October 20.

=== Lexington Legends ===
On April 21, 2022, Ramírez signed with the Lexington Legends of the Atlantic League of Professional Baseball. In 4 games for Lexington, he struggled to an 0–1 record and 11.25 ERA with 2 strikeouts over 4 innings of relief. Ramírez was released by the Legends on August 18.
