= Mike Bolsinger =

American baseball player (born 1988)

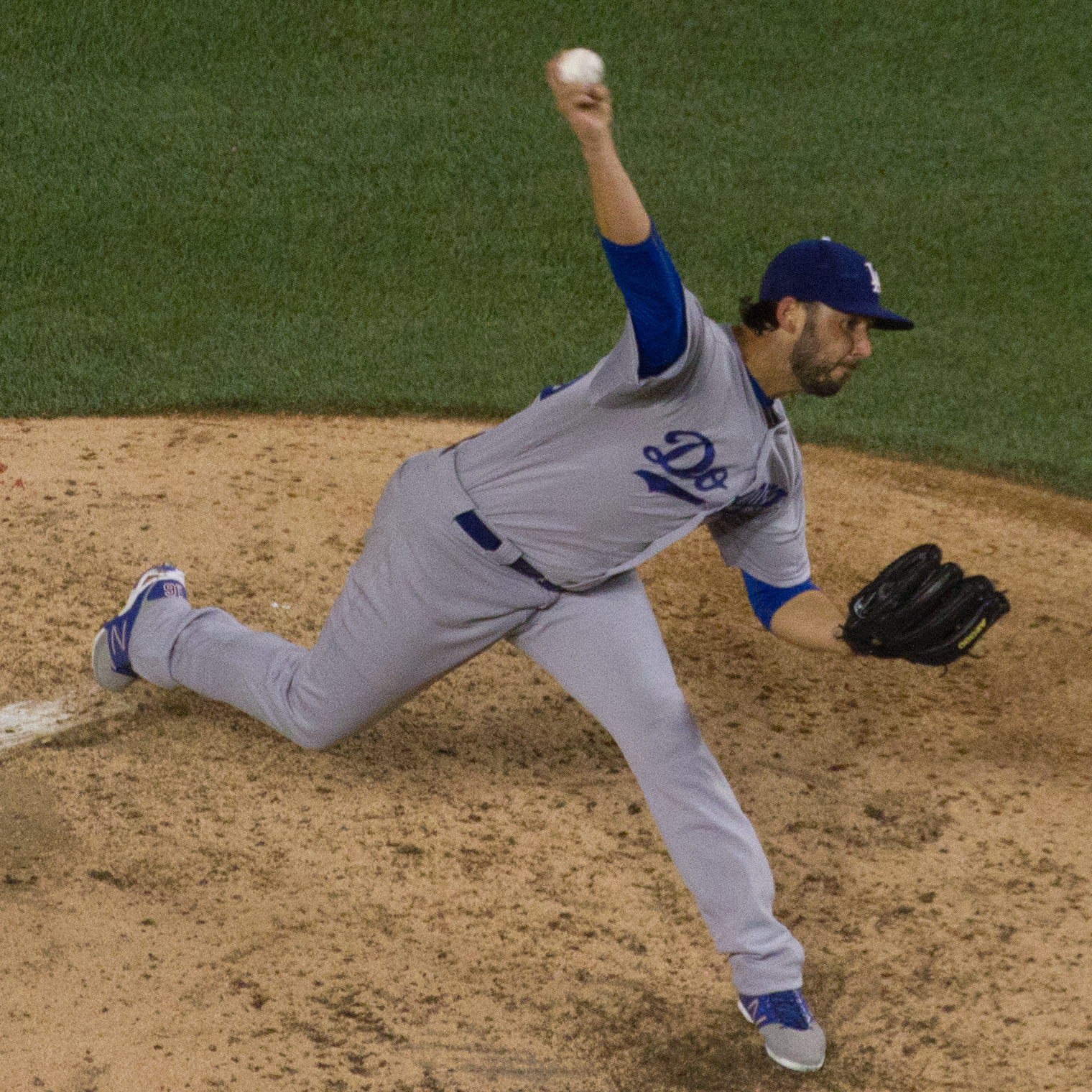
- Bolsinger with the Los Angeles Dodgers
- Pitcher
- Born: January 29, 1988 (age 38); McKinney, Texas, U.S.
- Batted: Right Threw: Right

Professional debut
- MLB: April 14, 2014, for the Arizona Diamondbacks
- NPB: March 31, 2018, for the Chiba Lotte Marines

Last appearance
- MLB: August 4, 2017, for the Toronto Blue Jays
- NPB: September 20, 2019, for the Chiba Lotte Marines

MLB statistics
- Win–loss record: 8–19
- Earned run average: 4.92
- Strikeouts: 210

NPB statistics
- Win–loss record: 17–8
- Earned run average: 3.79
- Strikeouts: 170
- Stats at Baseball Reference

Teams
- Arizona Diamondbacks (2014); Los Angeles Dodgers (2015–2016); Toronto Blue Jays (2017); Chiba Lotte Marines (2018–2019)

Career highlights and awards
- NPB All-Star (2018)

Michael P. Bolsinger (born January 29, 1988) is an American former professional baseball pitcher. He played in Major League Baseball (MLB) for the Arizona Diamondbacks, Los Angeles Dodgers, and Toronto Blue Jays and for the Chiba Lotte Marines of Nippon Professional Baseball (NPB).

== Early life ==
Bolsinger graduated from McKinney North High School in McKinney, Texas, where he was a three-year letterman in Baseball. As a senior, he pitched to a 9–3 win–loss record with a 1.66 earned run average (ERA) and 116 strikeouts and took his team to the state semi-finals, beating the Highland Park High School team that included future teammate Clayton Kershaw. He was drafted by the Cleveland Indians in the 34th round of the 2006 Major League Baseball draft and his high school coach said "Obviously he has the talent to play at the next level. It's not much of a surprise to me that he got drafted." He chose not to sign with the Indians because of the low round and, even though he had signed a letter of intent to Texas Tech University, he chose instead to attend Grayson County Community College in the hopes of being drafted again the next year. In 10 appearances for Grayson, he was 6–1 with a 2.93 ERA and struck out 48 batters.

Bolsinger played in the Texas Collegiate League during the summer of 2007 and chose to transfer to the University of Arkansas for the 2008 season. As a sophomore in 2008, he was 4–1 with a 3.73 ERA in 15 games, most of them out of the bullpen. He missed the start of the 2009 season as he was battling a bad case of mononucleosis He was 6–4 with a 2.99 ERA in 30 games pitched that season as the Razorbacks advanced to the College World Series, where they finished third. He was drafted in the 33rd round of the 2009 Major League Baseball draft by the Oakland Athletics, but chose to return to Arkansas for his senior season. Bolsinger began the 2010 season as the team's closer and earned a spot on the National Collegiate Baseball Writers Association "Stopper of the Year Watch List." However, he made a successful transition to the starting rotation during the season and earned Southeastern Conference pitcher of the week honors on May 10 when pitched eight innings and struck out 11 while allowing only two hits against the University of Mississippi. For the season, Bolsinger appeared in 23 games (13 as a starter) and was 6–5 with a 4.81 ERA.

== Professional career ==
=== Arizona Diamondbacks ===
Bolsinger was drafted by the Arizona Diamondbacks in the 15th round of the 2010 Major League Baseball draft and signed on June 26, 2010. He was assigned to the Short Season-A Yakima Bears of the Northwest League, where he had a 1.69 ERA in six games. He spent most of 2011 with the Class-A South Bend Silver Hawks of the Midwest League, appearing in 32 games and starting 13 of them. He also made one scoreless relief appearance with the Triple-A Reno Aces. He posted a 6–6 record with a 2.63 ERA and 91 strikeouts in the 2011 season. 2012 was split between the Advanced-A Visalia Rawhide of the California League and the Double-A Mobile BayBears of the Southern League. Combined he started 22 games and went 7–5 with a 3.35 ERA and 113 strikeouts in 115 2/3 innings.

Bolsinger began the 2013 season with nine appearances for Mobile, six of which were starts, and pitched to a 4–0 record, 2.51 ERA, and 31 strikeouts when he was promoted to Reno. Bolsinger would make 17 starts for Reno, and post a 7–7 win–loss record, 4.72 ERA.

Bolsinger was called up to the majors for the first time on April 14, 2014. He pitched three innings of relief that day against the New York Mets, while allowing six hits and two runs. He got his first Major League start on April 19 against the Los Angeles Dodgers and allowed seven runs in four innings to take the loss and recorded his first win when he worked 6.2 innings against the Chicago Cubs on April 24. That was his only win however as he went 1–6 with a 5.50 ERA in 10 games (nine starts) for the Diamondbacks in 2014. He also made 16 starts for Reno and was 8–3 with a 3.93 ERA. He was designated for assignment by the Diamondbacks on November 20, 2014.

=== Los Angeles Dodgers ===
Bolsinger was traded to the Los Angeles Dodgers in exchange for cash considerations on November 22, 2014. He was assigned to the Triple-A Oklahoma City Dodgers. The Dodgers recalled him from the minors to make a spot start on April 23 against the San Francisco Giants. He pitched 6 innings, allowing one run on 5 hits and had 5 strikeouts, but was not involved in the decision. He returned to the minors the following day. On May 23 against the San Diego Padres, Bolsinger retired 23 straight batters after giving up a leadoff single to Yangervis Solarte as he and Kenley Jansen faced only the minimum 27 batters in the game. He rejoined the Dodgers when rosters expanded in September. In 21 starts, he was 6–6 with a 3.62 ERA. Bolsinger began the 2016 season in Triple-A. He made six starts for the Dodgers in 2016, posting a 1–4 record, 6.83 ERA, and 25 strikeouts in 27 2/3 innings.

=== Toronto Blue Jays ===
On August 1, 2016, the Dodgers traded Bolsinger to the Toronto Blue Jays for Jesse Chavez. He was optioned to the Triple-A Buffalo Bisons, and recalled by the Blue Jays the following day. He was optioned back to Buffalo on August 3, without appearing in a game for Toronto. On April 1, 2017, Bolsinger was designated for assignment. He cleared waivers and was assigned back to Buffalo. On May 9, Bolsinger was called up by the Blue Jays. He made his first appearance for the Blue Jays that night, making a start and allowing two runs in 5 2/3 innings in a 6–0 defeat to the Cleveland Indians. On June 1, Bolsinger was designated for assignment by the Blue Jays. After clearing waivers, he accepted an assignment back to Triple-A Buffalo. On July 3, Bolsinger was re-added to the roster and recalled. On July 18, during the 13th inning of a game against the Boston Red Sox, Bolsinger became the second pitcher in franchise history to strike out 4 men in an inning, when he struck out Mitch Moreland, Jackie Bradley Jr., Deven Marrero, and Christian Vázquez. Bolsinger would take the loss in the game after allowing a walk-off home run to Hanley Ramírez in the 15th inning.

He was designated for assignment on August 5. On October 2, Bolsinger elected free agency.

=== Chiba Lotte Marines ===
On December 13, 2017, Bolsinger signed with the Chiba Lotte Marines of Nippon Professional Baseball (NPB). He was selected to the 2018 NPB All-Star game. Bolsinger finished the 2018 campaign with a 13–2 record and 3.06 ERA with 84 strikeouts in 117.2 innings pitched. On January 9, 2019, he re-signed with the Marines. Bolsinger worked to a 5–6 record and 4.42 ERA in 23 appearances in 2019. On November 30, the Marines announced Bolsinger would not return for the next season. On December 2, 2019, he became a free agent. In his two seasons for the Marines, Bolsinger had a 17–8 record with a 3.79 ERA and 170 strikeouts.

=== Long Island Ducks ===
On March 16, 2021, Bolsinger signed with the Long Island Ducks of the Atlantic League of Professional Baseball. Bolsinger pitched in 15 games for the Ducks, logging a 1–4 record and 5.31 ERA with 37 strikeouts. He became a free agent following the season.

== Post-playing career ==
In September 2021, Bolsinger joined Millsaps College as a coach for the baseball team.

== Houston Astros lawsuit ==
In February 2020, following MLB's findings in the Houston Astros sign stealing scandal, Bolsinger filed a lawsuit against the Houston Astros for personal damages to his career. Additionally, he is demanding that the Astros donate their $31 million in 2017 postseason bonuses to charity. Bolsinger authored an opinion article in The Washington Post explaining his reason for suing the Astros. Curiously, he filed the lawsuit in California despite there being no connection between Bolsinger, the Astros, or California. Judge David Cowan of the Los Angeles Superior Court dismissed the lawsuit. A refiling in Texas led to a subsequent nonfiling by August 2021, which meant the case was dismissed without prejudice.

== See also ==
- List of Major League Baseball single-inning strikeout leaders
