= 2017 Baltimore Orioles season =

Major League Baseball season

2017 Baltimore Orioles
- League: American League
- Division: East
- Ballpark: Oriole Park at Camden Yards
- City: Baltimore, Maryland
- Record: 75–87 (.463)
- Divisional place: 5th
- Owners: Peter Angelos
- General managers: Dan Duquette
- Managers: Buck Showalter
- Television: MASN; WJZ-TV (CBS 13) (Gary Thorne, Jim Palmer, Mike Bordick, Jim Hunter)
- Radio: WJZ-FM; Baltimore Orioles Radio Network (Joe Angel, Jim Hunter, Ben McDonald, Mike Bordick)

The 2017 Baltimore Orioles season was the 117th season in Baltimore Orioles franchise history, the 64th in Baltimore, and the 26th at Oriole Park at Camden Yards. Despite a modest 22–10 start to the season, they failed to improve from their 89–73 record from 2016. They were eliminated from playoff contention on September 23 with their loss to the Tampa Bay Rays, 7 1/2 behind the Minnesota Twins for the 2nd AL Wild Card spot. With their 82nd loss, also on September 23, they ensured a sub-.500 record for the second time under manager Buck Showalter, which marked Baltimore's first losing season since 2011. They went on to finish the season 75–87 (.463).

The Orioles would not win more than 54 games again until 2022. The Orioles also would not have a winning month in any of their months of a season again until 2022.

== Offseason ==
November 3: LF Steve Pearce activated from the 60-day disabled list; CF Michael Bourn, CF Drew Stubbs, C Matt Wieters, DH Pedro Alvarez, RHP Tommy Hunter, LF Steve Pearce, LHP Brian Duensing, & LF Nolan Reimold elected free agency.
November 4: LF Joey Rickard & LHP Chris Lee activated from the 60-day disabled list.
November 8: LHP Jed Bradley sent outright to AAA Norfolk.
November 18: Baltimore Orioles selected the contracts of RHP Jesús Liranzo from AA Bowie & of RHP Joe Gunkel from AAA Norfolk.
November 30: New York Mets traded RHP Logan Verrett to Baltimore Orioles for cash.

December 2: RHP Vance Worley elected free agency; Baltimore Orioles claimed OF Adam Walker off waivers from Milwaukee Brewers.
December 8: Baltimore Orioles selected OF Anthony Santander in the Rule 5 Draft from Cleveland Indians & OF Aneury Tavarez in the Rule 5 Draft from Boston Red Sox.
December 13: Baltimore Orioles signed free agent RHP Logan Ondrusek.
December 16: Baltimore Orioles signed free agent C Welington Castillo.

January 6: Seattle Mariners traded RF Seth Smith to Baltimore Orioles for RHP Yovani Gallardo & cash.
January 20: Baltimore Orioles signed free agent RF Mark Trumbo.

February 10: Baltimore Orioles designated C Francisco Pena for assignment; New York Mets traded RHP Gabriel Ynoa to Baltimore Orioles for cash.
February 15: Baltimore Orioles designated LHP T.J. McFarland for assignment.
February 19: Los Angeles Dodgers traded LHP Vidal Nuño to Baltimore Orioles for RHP Ryan Moseley.
February 20: Baltimore Orioles designated LF Christian Walker for assignment.
February 21: New York Yankees traded LHP Richard Bleier to Baltimore Orioles for Player To Be Named Later.
February 24: Baltimore Orioles released LHP T. J. McFarland.
February 25: Atlanta Braves claimed 1B Christian Walker off waivers from Baltimore Orioles.

March 7: OF Dariel Alvarez optioned to AAA Norfolk.
March 8: RHP Parker Bidwell & RHP Jason Garcia optioned to AAA Norfolk.
March 13: Baltimore Orioles signed free agent DH Pedro Alvarez to a minor league contract & invited him to spring training.
March 14: RHP Joe Gunkel optioned to AAA Norfolk.
March 15: Baltimore Orioles released RHP Logan Ondrusek.
March 19: RHP Jesus Liranzo optioned to AAA Norfolk.
March 22: LHP Richard Bleier optioned to AAA Norfolk.
March 25: LHP Chris Lee optioned to AAA Norfolk.
March 28: RHP Mike Wright optioned to AAA Norfolk; Philadelphia Phillies traded RHP Alec Asher to Baltimore Orioles for cash.
March 29: Baltimore Orioles placed OF Aneury Tavarez on waivers.
March 30: RHP Logan Verrett & RHP Alec Asher optioned to AAA Norfolk.
March 31: Baltimore Orioles signed free agent 1B Ryan Ripken to a minor league contract.

== Regular season ==
=== Transactions ===
==== Contracts ====
April 2: RF Aneury Tavarez returned to Boston Red Sox from Baltimore Orioles.
April 6: Texas Rangers traded LHP Andrew Faulkner to Baltimore Orioles for cash; Baltimore Orioles released RF Dariel Alvarez.
April 7: Colorado Rockies traded RHP Miguel Castro to Baltimore Orioles for a player to be named later.
April 10: Baltimore Orioles traded RHP Joe Gunkel to Los Angeles Dodgers for a player to be named later.
April 13: Contract of RHP Stefan Crichton selected from AAA Norfolk; Milwaukee Brewers traded RHP Damien Magnifico to Baltimore Orioles for future considerations.
April 14: Baltimore Orioles traded RHP Oliver Drake to Milwaukee Brewers for cash; Seattle Mariners traded LHP Paul Fry to Baltimore Orioles for future considerations.
April 17: RHP Jason Garcia sent outright to AA Bowie; Baltimore Orioles traded RHP Parker Bridwell to Los Angeles Angels for future considerations.

May 1: RHP Mike Wright assigned to Norfolk Tides.
May 2: Contract of C Francisco Pena selected from Norfolk Tides; RHP Damien Magnifico designated for assignment.
May 6: Baltimore Orioles traded RHP Damien Magnifico to Los Angeles Angels for RHP Jordan Kipper.
May 14: OF Craig Gentry sent outright to AAA Norfolk.
May 17: C Francisco Pena designated for assignment.
May 20: Chicago White Sox traded LHP Alex Katz to Baltimore Orioles for future considerations.
May 21: Contract of Paul Janish selected from AAA Norfolk.
May 23: C Francisco Pena sent outright to AAA Norfolk; Baltimore Orioles released OF Michael Bourne from minor league contract.
May 24: Baltimore Orioles claimed SS Luis Sardinas off waivers from San Diego Padres.
May 26: SS Luis Sardinas sent outright to AAA Norfolk.
May 31: Contract of C Francisco Pena selected from AAA Norfolk.

June 4: LHP Paul Fry sent outright to AAA Norfolk; New York Yankees traded SS Ruben Tejada to Baltimore Orioles for cash.
June 6: SS Paul Janish designated for assignment; Contract of SS Ruben Tejada selected from AAA Norfolk.
June 7: Contract of RHP Edwin Jackson selected from AAA Norfolk.
June 10: C Francisco Pena designated for assignment; Baltimore Orioles signed LF Adam Brett Walker.
June 11: RHP Edwin Jackson designated for assignment; Contract of RHP Jimmy Yacabonis selected from AAA Norfolk.
June 13: C Francisco Pena sent outright to AAA Norfolk; RHP Edwin Jackson elected free agency.
June 14: Contract of 1B David Washington selected from AAA Norfolk.
June 19: Contract of SS Paul Janish selected from AAA Norfolk.
June 20: Contract of LF Craig Gentry selected from AAA Norfolk.

July 6: 1B David Washington designated for assignment; Contract of 2B Johnny Giavotella selected from AAA Norfolk.
July 8: SS Paul Janish designated for assignment; Milwaukee Brewers traded RHP Aaron Myers to Baltimore Orioles for future considerations.
July 11: SS Paul Janish and 1B David Washington sent outright to AAA Norfolk.
July 14 LF Craig Gentry sent outright to AAA Norfolk.
July 29: Philadelphia Phillies traded RHP Jeremy Hellickson and cash to Baltimore Orioles for LF Hyun Soo Kim, LHP Garrett Cleavinger and future considerations.
July 30: Contract of LF Craig Gentry selected from AAA Norfolk .
July 31: New York Yankees traded RHP Yefry Ramirez to Baltimore Orioles for future considerations; Tampa Bay Rays traded SS Tim Beckham to Baltimore Orioles for RHP Tobias Myers; RHP Jeremy Hellickson activated.

August 1: SS Tim Beckham activated; 2B Johnny Giavotella designated for assignment.
August 3: 2B Johnny Giavotella sent outright to AAA Norfolk.
August 5: Texas Rangers traded 2B Brallan Perez to Baltimore Orioles for future considerations.
August 9: Baltimore Orioles traded RHP Steve Johnson to Chicago White Sox for cash; Baltimore Orioles signed LHP Raudel Lazo.
August 17: SS Ruben Tejada sent outright to AAA Norfolk.
August 23: LHP Vidal Nuno sent outright to AAA Norfolk.

September 1: Contracts of RHP Richard Rodriguez, 1B Pedro Alvarez, and C Chance Sisco selected from AAA Norfolk; RHP Tyler Wilson and RHP Logan Verrett designated for assignment.
September 5: RHP Tyler Wilson and RHP Logan Verrett sent outright to AAA Norfolk; Contract of CF Austin Hays selected from AA Bowie; LHP Jayson Aquino designated for assignment.
September 8: LHP Andrew Faulkner designated for assignment; LHP Jayson Aquino sent outright to AAA Norfolk.
September 9: LHP Jayson Aquino sent outright to AAA Norfolk.
September 13: LHP Andrew Faulkner sent outright to AAA Norfolk.
September 17: RHP Richard Rodriguez sent outright to AAA Norfolk and designated for assignment; Contract of LHP Tanner Scott selected from AA Bowie.

==== Callups & optional assignments ====
April 2: LHP Jayson Aquino & RHP Gabriel Ynoa optioned to AAA Norfolk; OF Craig Gentry recalled from AAA Norfolk.
April 13: RHP Damien Magnifico optioned to AAA Norfolk.
April 15: RHP Stefan Crichton optioned to AAA Norfolk; RHP Alec Asher recalled from AAA Norfolk.
April 16: RHP Stefan Crichton recalled from AAA Norfolk.
April 19: RHP Tyler Wilson optioned to AAA Norfolk; LHP Jayson Aquino recalled from AAA Norfolk.
April 25: RHP Stefan Crichton optioned to AAA Norfolk; LHP Paul Fry recalled from AAA Norfolk.
April 27: LHP Paul Fry optioned to AAA Norfolk.
April 30: LHP Jayson Aquino & LHP Vidal Nuno optioned to AAA Norfolk; RHP Logan Verrett & LHP Richard Bleier recalled form AAA Norfolk.

May 1: LHP Logan Verrett optioned to AAA Norfolk; RHP Mike Wright recalled from AAA Norfolk.
May 4: RHP Tyler Wilson & RHP Gabriel Ynoa recalled from AAA Norfolk; LHP Richard Bleier & RHP Alec Asher optioned to AAA Norfolk.
May 6: RHP Logan Verrett & RHP Alec Asher recalled from AAA Norfolk.
May 7: RHP Stefan Crichton optioned to AAA Norfolk.
May 10: RHP Logan Verrett optioned to AAA Norfolk; LHP Vidal Nuno recalled from AAA Norfolk.
May 14: LHP Vidal Nuno optioned to AAA Norfolk; LHP Richard Bleier recalled from AAA Norfolk.
May 17: RHP Stefan Crichton recalled from AAA Norfolk; RHP Miguel Castro recalled from AA Bowie; LHP Donnie Hart optioned to AAA Norfolk.
May 22: RHP Miguel Castro optioned to AA Bowie; RHP Tyler Wilson recalled from AAA Norfolk.
May 23: RHP Stefan Crichton optioned to AAA Norfolk; LHP Jayson Aquino recalled from AAA Norfolk.
May 27: LHP Jayson Aquino optioned to AAA Norfolk; LHP Donnie Hart recalled from AAA Norfolk.
May 28: RHP Tyler Wilson optioned to AAA Norfolk; RHP Logan Verrett recalled from AAA Norfolk.
May 31: LHP Logan Verrett optioned to AAA Norfolk; RHP Mike Wright recalled from AAA Norfolk.

June 7: LHP Donnie Hart optioned to AAA Norfolk.
June 9: RHP Stefan Crichton recalled from AAA Norfolk.
June 11: RHP Stefan Crichton optioned to AAA Norfolk; RHP Logan Verrett recalled from AAA Norfolk.
June 12: RHP Miguel Castro recalled from AA Bowie.
June 16: RHP Jimmy Yacabonis optioned to AAA Norfolk; LHP Vidal Nuno & RHP Gabriel Ynoa recalled from AAA Norfolk.
June 20: LHP Vidal Nuno & 1B David Washington optioned to AAA Norfolk; LHP Donnie Hart recalled from AAA Norfolk.
June 23: RHP Gabriel Ynoa optioned to AAA Norfolk.
June 24: RHP Miguel Castro optioned to AA Bowie; RHP Stefan Crichton recalled from AAA Norfolk.
June 30: RHP Miguel Castro recalled from AA Bowie.

July 1: RHP Alec Asher optioned to AAA Norfolk; RHP Jimmy Yacabonis recalled from AAA Norfolk.
July 4: Jimmy Yacabonis optioned to AAA Norfolk; Tyler Wilson recalled from AAA Norfolk.
July 5: RHP Tyler Wilson optioned to AAA Norfolk; LHP Jayson Aquino recalled from AAA Norfolk.
July 6: LHP Jayson Aquino optioned to AAA Norfolk.
July 17: RHP Stefan Crichton optioned to AAA Norfolk.
July 22: RHP Mike Wright optioned to AAA Norfolk.

August 9: LHP Donnie Hart optioned to AAA Norfolk.
August 17: LF Joey Rickard optioned to AAA Norfolk.
August 20: RHP Alec Asher recalled from AAA Norfolk.
August 23: RHP Alec Asher optioned to AAA Norfolk.
August 25: RHP Mike Wright recalled from AAA Norfolk.
August 28: RHP Mike Wright optioned to AAA Norfolk; LHP Donnie Hart recalled from AAA Norfolk.
August 29: LHP Donnie Hart optioned to AAA Norfolk.

September 1: LF Joey Rickard and RHP Jimmy Yacabonis recalled from AAA Norfolk.
September 2: LHP Donnie Hart and RHP Alec Asher recalled from AAA Norfolk.
September 3: RHP Alec Asher optioned to AA Bowie; RHP Gabriel Ynoa recalled from AAA Norfolk.
September 7: RHP Mike Wright recalled from AAA Norfolk.

October 2: RHP Stefan Crichton and LHP Chris Lee recalled from AAA Norfolk; RHP Yefry Ramirez, RHP Alec Asher, and RHP Jesus Liranzo recalled from AA Bowie.

==== Injuries etc. ====
April 2: LHP Wade Miley (Upper respiratory infection), RHP Chris Tillman (Right shoulder bursitis), & OF Anthony Santander (Strained right forearm) placed on the 10-day disabled list, retroactive to March 30.
April 9: OF Joey Rickard (sprained finger) placed on the 10-day disabled list; LHP Wade Miley activated from the 10-day disabled list
April 16: LHP Zach Britton (forearm strain) placed on the 10-day disabled list, retroactive to April 15.
April 28: LF Joey Rickard activated from the 10-day disabled list.

May 1: LHP Zach Britton activated from the 10-day disabled list; C Welington Castillo (Right shoulder tendinitis) placed on the 10-day disabled list, retroactive to May 1.
May 6: LHP Zach Britton (Left forearm strain) placed on the 10-day disabled list, retroactive to May 5, 2017; RHP Gabriel Ynoa (Right hamstring strain) placed on the 10-day disabled list.
May 7: RHP Chris Tillman activated from the 10-day disabled list.
May 14: C Welington Castillo activated from the 10-day disabled list.
May 20: SS Ryan Flaherty (Right shoulder strain) placed on the 10-day disabled list, retroactive to May 19, 2016.
May 31: C Welington Castillo (Groin contusion) placed on the 10-day disabled list.

June 9: RHP Darren O'Day (Right shoulder strain) placed on the 10-day disabled list, retroactive to June 7, 2017.
June 10: C Welington Castillo activated from the 10-day disabled list.
June 14: OF Anthony Santander transferred from the 10-day disabled list to the 60-day disabled list; 1B Chris Davis (Right oblique strain) placed on the 10-day disabled list, retroactive to June 13.
June 16: RHP Mike Wright (Right shoulder bursitis) placed on the 10-day disabled list retroactive to June 15, 2017.
June 19: SS J.J. Hardy (Right wrist fracture) placed on the 10-day disabled list.
June 20: LHP Zach Britton transferred from the 10-day disabled list to the 60-day disabled list.
June 23: RHP Darren O'Day activated from the 10-day disabled list.

July 5: LHP Zach Britton reactivated from 60-day disabled list; RHP Chris Tillman placed on paternity list; IF Ryan Flaherty transferred from the 10-day disabled list to the 60-day disabled list.
July 8: RHP Chris Tillman activated from the paternity list.
July 14: 1B Chris Davis activated from the 10-day disabled list.
July 31: SS J.J. Hardy transferred from the 10-day disabled list to the 60-day disabled list; DH Mark Trumbo (Right rib cage strain) placed on the 10-day disabled list, retroactive to July 30.

August 9: DH Mark Trumbo activated from the 10-day disabled list.
August 17: SS Ryan Flaherty and OF Anthony Santander activated from the 60-day disabled list.
August 20: RHP Miguel Castro placed on the bereavement list.
August 23: RHP Miguel Castro activated from the bereavement list.
August 25: RHP Dylan Bundy on the placed bereavement list.
August 29: RHP Dylan Bundy activated from bereavement list.

September 2: LF Craig Gentry (Fractured right finger) placed on the 10-day disabled list.
September 8: SS J.J. Hardy activated from the 60-day disabled list.
September 12: LF Craig Gentry activated from the 10-day disabled list.

=== Season highlights ===
- On April 16, rookie outfielder/DH Trey Mancini tied an MLB record with 7 home runs in his first 12 big-league games. He tied another record on April 22 with 8 homers in his first 17 games.
- On April 26, RF Seth Smith was instrumental in a bizarre extra-inning win over Tampa Bay with a two-run "Little League homer" (a single plus two throwing errors) and a "walk-off walk," drawing a base on balls with the sacks full in the bottom of the 11th.
- On May 22, CF Adam Jones hit his 125th home run in Camden Yards, passing Rafael Palmeiro to become the all-time home run leader at Camden Yards.
- On May 31, returning to the lineup after missing four games due to an ankle injury, Adam Jones went 3–5 with a home run and five RBIs, collecting his 1500th career hit as an Oriole.
- On July 23 closer Zach Britton recorded his 55th consecutive save, breaking the American League record set by Boston's Tom Gordon in 1998–99.
- On August 3 against the Tigers, the Orioles turned a rare triple play, Machado to Schoop to Davis.
- On August 18, Manny Machado hits his third grand slam of the season, becoming the first Oriole with multiple 3+ grand slam seasons. Machado becomes just the third player in MLB history with back-to-back 3+ grand slam seasons.
- On August 23 Britton's American League record save streak ended at 60, as he allowed the Athletics to tie the game in the 9th. Britton had last failed to convert a save opportunity on October 1, 2015.
- On August 28, Adam Jones became the first player in franchise history to record seven consecutive seasons with 25 or more home runs.
- On August 31, Adam Jones hit the Orioles' 56th home run of the month, setting a new MLB record for most home runs in the month of August. Chris Davis added another homer to extend the record to 57, also the third most in any calendar month in MLB history.
- On August 31, Jonathan Schoop became the third middle infielder in Orioles history to record 30+ homers and 100+ RBIs in a single season.
- For the month of August, Tim Beckham collects 50 hits, the second most in a single calendar month in Orioles history.

== Season standings ==
=== American League East ===
AL East
Team	W	L	Pct.	GB	Home	Road
Boston Red Sox	93	69	.574	—	48‍–‍33	45‍–‍36
New York Yankees	91	71	.562	2	51‍–‍30	40‍–‍41
Tampa Bay Rays	80	82	.494	13	42‍–‍39	38‍–‍43
Toronto Blue Jays	76	86	.469	17	42‍–‍39	34‍–‍47
Baltimore Orioles	75	87	.463	18	46‍–‍35	29‍–‍52

=== American League Wild Card ===
Division leaders
Team	W	L	Pct.
Cleveland Indians	102	60	.630
Houston Astros	101	61	.623
Boston Red Sox	93	69	.574

Wild Card teams (Top 2 teams qualify for postseason)
Team	W	L	Pct.	GB
New York Yankees	91	71	.562	+6
Minnesota Twins	85	77	.525	—
Kansas City Royals	80	82	.494	5
Los Angeles Angels	80	82	.494	5
Tampa Bay Rays	80	82	.494	5
Seattle Mariners	78	84	.481	7
Texas Rangers	78	84	.481	7
Toronto Blue Jays	76	86	.469	9
Baltimore Orioles	75	87	.463	10
Oakland Athletics	75	87	.463	10
Chicago White Sox	67	95	.414	18
Detroit Tigers	64	98	.395	21

=== Record vs. opponents ===
2017 American League record Source: MLB Standings Grid – 2017
Team	BAL	BOS	CWS	CLE	DET	HOU	KC	LAA	MIN	NYY	OAK	SEA	TB	TEX	TOR	NL
Baltimore	—	10–9	4–3	1–6	3–4	1–5	3–3	2–4	2–5	7–12	4–3	4–2	8–11	6–1	12–7	8–12
Boston	9–10	—	6–1	4–3	3–4	3–4	2–4	2–4	5–2	8–11	3–4	3–3	11–8	5–1	13–6	16–4
Chicago	3–4	1–6	—	6–13	10–9	4–2	10–9	3–4	7–12	3–4	1–5	3–4	3–3	4–3	3–3	6–14
Cleveland	6–1	3–4	13–6	—	13–6	5–1	12–7	6–0	12–7	5–2	3–4	4–2	4–3	6–1	4–2	6–14
Detroit	4–3	4–3	9–10	6–13	—	3–4	8–11	3–4	8–11	3–3	1–5	1–6	2–5	1–5	3–3	8–12
Houston	5–1	4–3	2–4	1–5	4–3	—	3–4	12–7	5–1	5–2	12–7	14–5	3–4	12–7	4–3	15–5
Kansas City	3–3	4–2	9–10	7–12	11–8	4–3	—	6–1	8–11	2–5	3–3	5–2	4–3	1–6	3–3	9–11
Los Angeles	4–2	4–2	4–3	0–6	4–3	7–12	1–6	—	2–5	4–2	12–7	12–7	3–4	8–11	4–3	11–9
Minnesota	5–2	2–5	12–7	7–12	11–8	1–5	11–8	5–2	—	2–4	3–3	3–4	2–4	4–3	4–3	13–7
New York	12–7	11–8	4–3	2–5	3–3	2–5	5–2	2–4	4–2	—	2–5	5–2	12–7	3–3	9–10	15–5
Oakland	3–4	4–3	5–1	4–3	5–1	7–12	3–3	7–12	3–3	5–2	—	7–12	2–5	10–9	2–5	7–13
Seattle	2–4	3–3	4–3	2–4	6–1	5–14	2–5	7–12	4–3	2–5	12–7	—	5–1	11–8	1–6	12–8
Tampa Bay	11–8	8–11	3–3	3–4	5–2	4–3	3–4	4–3	4–2	7–12	5–2	1–5	—	2–4	9–10	11–9
Texas	1–6	1–5	3–4	1–6	5–1	7–12	6–1	11–8	3–4	3–3	9–10	8–11	4–2	—	3–4	14–6
Toronto	7–12	6–13	3–3	2–4	3–3	3–4	3–3	3–4	3–4	10–9	5–2	6–1	10–9	4–3	—	9–11

== Game log ==
Past games legend
Orioles Win	Orioles Loss	Game postponed	Eliminated from playoff contention
Bold denotes an Orioles pitcher

Baltimore Orioles 2017 Season Game Log — Season Record: 75–87 (.463)
April: 15–8 (Home: 8–3; Away: 7–5)

#	Date	Opponent	Score	Win	Loss	Save	Attendance	Record	Box/ Streak
1	April 3	Blue Jays	3–2 (11)	**Wilson** (1–0)	Grilli (0–1)	—	45,667	1–0	W1
2	April 5	Blue Jays	3–1	**Bundy** (1–0)	Happ (0–1)	**Britton** (1)	16,086	2–0	W2
3	April 7	Yankees	6–5	**Hart** (1–0)	Clippard (0–1)	**Britton** (2)	25,248	3–0	W3
4	April 8	Yankees	5–4	**Givens** (1–0)	Betances (0–1)	**Britton** (3)	38,916	4–0	W4
5	April 9	Yankees	3–7	Betances (1–1)	**O'Day** (0–1)	—	42,487	4–1	L1
6	April 11	@ Red Sox	1–8	Pomeranz (1–0)	**Bundy** (1–1)	—	37,497	4–2	L2
7	April 12	@ Red Sox	12–5	**Givens** (2–0)	Wright (0–1)	—	32,211	5–2	W1
8	April 13	@ Blue Jays	2–1	**Gausman** (1–0)	Liriano (0–1)	**Britton** (4)	32,957	6–2	W2
9	April 14	@ Blue Jays	6–4	**Miley** (1–0)	Sanchez (0–1)	**Britton** (5)	39,547	7–2	W3
10	April 15	@ Blue Jays	1–2	Osuna (1–0)	**Wilson** (1–1)	—	40,743	7–3	L1
11	April 16	@ Blue Jays	11–4	**Bundy** (2–1)	Happ (0–3)	—	38,188	8–3	W1
12	April 18	@ Reds	3–9	Arroyo (1–2)	**Gausman** (1–1)	—	16,018	8–4	L1
13	April 19	@ Reds	2–0	**Jiménez** (1–0)	Garrett (2–1)	**Brach** (1)	15,083	9–4	W1
14	April 20	@ Reds	2–1 (10)	**O'Day** (1–1)	Wood (0–2)	**Brach** (2)	11,910	10–4	W2
15	April 21	Red Sox	2–0	**Bundy** (3–1)	Pomeranz (1–1)	**Brach** (3)	34,442	11–4	W3
16	April 22	Red Sox	4–2	**Aquino** (1–0)	Wright (1–2)	**O'Day** (1)	35,457	12–4	W4
17	April 23	Red Sox	2–6	Rodriguez (1–1)	**Gausman** (1–2)	Kimbrel (7)	35,522	12–5	L1
18	April 24	Rays	6–3	**Givens** (3–0)	Archer (2–1)	**Brach** (4)	11,142	13–5	W1
19	April 25	Rays	0–2	Whitley (1–0)	**Miley** (1–1)	Colomé (5)	11,472	13–6	L1
20	April 26	Rays	5–4 (11)	**Asher** (1–0)	Colomé (0–1)	—	16,289	14–6	W1
21	April 28	@ Yankees	11–14 (10)	Chapman (1–0)	**Aquino** (0–1)	—	36,912	14–7	L1
22	April 29	@ Yankees	4–12	Pineda (3–1)	**Jiménez** (1–1)	—	37,303	14–8	L2
23	April 30	@ Yankees	7–4 (11)	**Verrett** (1–0)	Mitchell (1–1)	—	41,022	15–8	W1

May: 12–16 (Home: 9–5; Away: 3–11)

#	Date	Opponent	Score	Win	Loss	Save	Attendance	Record	Box/ Streak
24	May 1	@ Red Sox	5–2	**Bundy** (4–1)	Porcello (1–4)	**Brach** (5)	33,489	16–8	W2
25	May 2	@ Red Sox	2–5	Sale (2–2)	**Asher** (1–1)	Kimbrel (9)	32,932	16–9	L1
26	May 3	@ Red Sox	2–4	Pomeranz (3–1)	**Gausman** (1–3)	Kimbrel (10)	33,162	16–10	L2
27	May 4	@ Red Sox	8–3	**Wilson** (2–1)	Kendrick (0–1)	—	36,563	17–10	W1
28	May 5	White Sox	4–2	**Ynoa** (1–0)	González (3–2)	**Brach** (6)	20,302	18–10	W2
29	May 6	White Sox	6–5	**Bundy** (5–1)	Covey (0–3)	**O'Day** (2)	28,718	19–10	W3
30	May 7	White Sox	4–0	**Tillman** (1–0)	Quintana (2–5)	**Brach** (7)	31,806	20–10	W4
31	May 8	Nationals	6–4	**Gausman** (2–3)	Gonzalez (3–1)	**Brach** (8)	23,525	21–10	W5
32	May 9	Nationals	5–4 (12)	**Verrett** (2–0)	Turner (1–1)	—	26,348	22–10	W6
33	May 10	@ Nationals	6–7	Albers (2–0)	**Brach** (0–1)	—	32,984	22–11	L1
—	May 11	@ Nationals	Postponed (rain). Makeup date June 8.						
34	May 12	@ Royals	2–3	Soria (2–1)	**Nuño** (0–1)	Herrera (6)	25,467	22–12	L2
35	May 13	@ Royals	3–4	Maness (1–0)	**Asher** (1–2)	Herrera (7)	24,662	22–13	L3
36	May 14	@ Royals	8–9	Strahm (1–2)	**Bleier** (0–1)	Herrera (8)	30,662	22–14	L4
37	May 16	@ Tigers	13–11 (13)	**Bleier** (1–1)	Rodríguez (1–5)	—	25,109	23–14	W1
38	May 17	@ Tigers	4–5	Fulmer (5–1)	**Jiménez** (1–2)	J Wilson (3)	29,722	23–15	L1
39	May 18	@ Tigers	5–6	Zimmermann (4–2)	**Bundy** (5–2)	A Wilson (2)	32,455	23–16	L2
40	May 19	Blue Jays	5–3 (10)	**Givens** (4–0)	Grilli (1–4)	—	31,916	24–16	W1
41	May 20	Blue Jays	7–5	**Givens** (5–0)	Barnes (0–2)	**Brach** (9)	45,416	25–16	W2
42	May 21	Blue Jays	1–3	Estrada (3–2)	**Miley** (1–2)	Osuna (6)	36,632	25–17	L1
43	May 22	Twins	7–14	Gibson (1–4)	**Wilson** (2–2)	—	12,882	25–18	L2
44	May 23	Twins	0–2	Santana (7–2)	**Bundy** (5–3)	—	13,294	25–19	L3
45	May 24	Twins	3–4	Berríos (3–0)	**Tillman** (1–1)	Kintzler (12)	32,267	25–20	L4
46	May 26	@ Astros	0–2	Musgrove (4–4)	**Gausman** (2–4)	Giles (14)	31,380	25–21	L5
47	May 27	@ Astros	2–5	Keuchel (8–0)	**Miley** (1–3)	Harris (2)	32,761	25–22	L6
48	May 28	@ Astros	4–8	McCullers Jr. (6–1)	**Asher** (1–3)	—	34,720	25–23	L7
49	May 29	Yankees	3–2	**Bundy** (6–3)	Montgomery (2–4)	**Brach** (10)	40,242	26–23	W1
50	May 30	Yankees	3–8	Severino (4–2)	**Tillman** (1–2)	—	16,126	26–24	L1
51	May 31	Yankees	10–4	**Gausman** (3–4)	Tanaka (5–5)	—	22,983	27–24	W1

June: 12–16 (Home: 7–7; Away: 5–9)

#	Date	Opponent	Score	Win	Loss	Save	Attendance	Record	Box/ Streak
52	June 1	Red Sox	7–5	**Miley** (2–3)	Rodriguez (4–2)	—	20,150	28–24	W2
53	June 2	Red Sox	3–2	**Asher** (2–3)	Porcello (3–7)	**Brach** (11)	33,193	29–24	W3
54	June 3	Red Sox	2–5	Price (1–0)	**Bundy** (6–4)	Kimbrel (16)	35,470	29–25	L1
55	June 4	Red Sox	3–7	Sale (7–2)	**Tillman** (1–3)	—	31,819	29–26	L2
56	June 6	Pirates	6–5 (10)	**Brach** (3–1)	LeBlanc (1–1)	—	26,724	30–26	W1
57	June 7	Pirates	9–6 (11)	**Givens** (6–0)	LeBlanc (1–2)	—	19,957	31–26	W2
58	June 8	@ Nationals	1–6	Ross (3–2)	**Asher** (2–4)	—	37,833	31–27	L1
59	June 9	@ Yankees	2–8	Montgomery (4–4)	**Bundy** (6–5)	—	46,031	31–28	L2
60	June 10	@ Yankees	3–16	Severino (5–2)	**Tillman** (1–4)	—	45,232	31–29	L3
61	June 11	@ Yankees	3–14	Warren (2–1)	**Gausman** (3–5)	—	46,348	31–30	L4
62	June 12	@ White Sox	7–10	Petricka (1–0)	**Miley** (2–4)	—	17,665	31–31	L5
63	June 13	@ White Sox	1–6	Holland (5–6)	**Asher** (2–5)	—	15,038	31–32	L6
64	June 14	@ White Sox	10–6	**Bundy** (7–5)	González (4–8)	—	20,008	32–32	W1
65	June 15	@ White Sox	2–5	Swarzak (3–1)	**Tillman** (1–5)	—	20,139	32–33	L1
66	June 16	Cardinals	2–11	Martinez (6–5)	**Gausman** (3–6)	—	26,341	32–34	L2
67	June 17	Cardinals	15–7	**Miley** (3–4)	Wainwright (7–5)	—	27,788	33–34	W1
68	June 18	Cardinals	8–5	**Jiménez** (2–2)	Lynn (5–4)	**Brach** (12)	34,854	34–34	W2
69	June 19	Indians	0–12	Kluber (6–2)	**Bundy** (7–6)	—	13,875	34–35	L1
70	June 20	Indians	6–5	**Castro** (1–0)	Shaw (1–2)	**Brach** (13)	22,891	35–35	W1
71	June 21	Indians	1–5	Carrasco (8–3)	**Gausman** (3–7)	Shaw (2)	29,596	35–36	L1
72	June 22	Indians	3–6	Clevinger (3–3)	**Miley** (3–5)	—	24,954	35–37	L2
73	June 23	@ Rays	5–15	Archer (6–4)	**Jiménez** (2–3)	Pruitt (1)	18,929	35–38	L3
74	June 24	@ Rays	8–3	**Bundy** (8–6)	Alvarado (0–3)	—	23,902	36–38	W1
75	June 25	@ Rays	8–5	**Brach** (2–1)	Colomé (1–3)	—	15,943	37–38	W2
76	June 27	@ Blue Jays	3–1	**Gausman** (4–7)	Biagini (2–7)	**Brach** (14)	40,606	38–38	W3
77	June 28	@ Blue Jays	0–4	Stroman (8–4)	**Miley** (3–6)	—	38,847	38–39	L1
78	June 29	@ Blue Jays	2–0	**Jiménez** (3–3)	Happ (2–5)	**Brach** (15)	37,291	39–39	W1
79	June 30	Rays	4–6	Díaz (1–3)	**O'Day** (1–2)	Colomé (21)	24,398	39–40	L1

July: 12–14 (Home: 7–6; Away: 5–8)

#	Date	Opponent	Score	Win	Loss	Save	Attendance	Record	Box/ Streak
80	July 1	Rays	3–10	Odorizzi (5–3)	**Bundy** (8–7)	—	28,346	39–41	L2
81	July 2	Rays	7–1	**Gausman** (5–7)	Cobb (6–6)	—	26,489	40–41	W1
82	July 3	@ Brewers	1–8	Suter (1–1)	**Miley** (3–7)	—	36,457	40–42	L1
83	July 4	@ Brewers	2–6	Nelson (7–4)	**Jiménez** (3–4)	—	31,818	40–43	L2
84	July 5	@ Brewers	0–4	Garza (4–4)	**Aquino** (1–2)	—	27,734	40–44	L3
85	July 6	@ Twins	4–6	Berríos (8–2)	**Bundy** (8–8)	Kintzler (23)	19,706	40–45	L4
86	July 7	@ Twins	6–9	Hildenberger (1–0)	**M. Castro** (1–1)	Kintzler (24)	28,668	40–46	L5
87	July 8	@ Twins	5–1	**Miley** (4–7)	Mejía (4–4)	—	26,323	41–46	W1
88	July 9	@ Twins	11–5	**Jiménez** (4–4)	Gibson (5–7)	—	25,848	42–46	W2
ASG	July 11	@ Marlins Park	AL 2–1 (10) NL	Kimbrel	Davis	Miller	37,188	—	Box
89	July 14	Cubs	8–9	Uehara (3–4)	**Brach** (2–2)	Davis (17)	34,335	42–47	L1
90	July 15	Cubs	3–10	Arrieta (9–7)	**Miley** (4–8)	—	40,258	42–48	L2
91	July 16	Cubs	0–8	Quintana (5–8)	**Jiménez** (4–5)	—	31,105	42–49	L3
92	July 17	Rangers	3–1	**Bleier** (2–1)	Cashner (4–8)	**Brach** (16)	14,922	43–49	W1
93	July 18	Rangers	12–1	**Bundy** (9–8)	Ross (2–2)	—	18,119	44–49	W2
94	July 19	Rangers	10–2	**Gausman** (6–7)	Pérez (5–7)	—	15,693	45–49	W3
95	July 20	Rangers	9–7	**Castro** (2–1)	Hamels (4–1)	—	14,961	46–49	W4
96	July 21	Astros	7–8	Fiers (7–4)	**Jiménez** (4–6)	Giles (21)	25,784	46–50	L1
97	July 22	Astros	4–8	Martes (3–0)	**O'Day** (1–3)	—	32,524	46–51	L2
98	July 23	Astros	9–7	**Givens** (7–0)	Gregerson (2–3)	**Britton** (6)	21,533	47–51	W1
99	July 24	@ Rays	5–0	**Gausman** (7–7)	Snell (0–6)	—	15,187	48–51	W2
100	July 25	@ Rays	4–5	Faria (5–1)	**Miley** (4–9)	Colomé (29)	12,471	48–52	L1
101	July 26	@ Rays	1–5	Cobb (9–6)	**Jiménez** (4–7)	—	18,430	48–53	L2
102	July 28	@ Rangers	2–8	Cashner (6–8)	**Tillman (1–6)**	—	36,270	48–54	L3
103	July 29	@ Rangers	4–0	**Gausman** (8–7)	Bibens-Dirkx (3–1)	**Britton** (7)	44,658	49–54	W1
104	July 30	@ Rangers	10–6	**Miley** (5–9)	Perez (5–9)	**Britton** (8)	32,437	50–54	W2
105	July 31	Royals	2–1	**Britton** (1–0)	Soria (4–3)	—	20,663	51–54	W3

August: 17–12 (Home: 10–6; Away: 7–6)

#	Date	Opponent	Score	Win	Loss	Save	Attendance	Record	Box/ Streak
106	August 1	Royals	7–2	**Bundy** (10–8)	Kennedy (4–7)	—	20,931	52–54	W4
107	August 2	Royals	6–0	**Hellickson** (7–5)	Vargas (13–5)	—	14,984	53–54	W5
108	August 3	Tigers	5–7	Saupold (3–1)	**Tillman** (1–7)	Greene (3)	17,157	53–55	L1
109	August 4	Tigers	2–5	Verlander (7–7)	**Givens** (7–1)	Rondón (1)	22,882	53–56	L2
110	August 5	Tigers	5–2	**Brach** (3–2)	Jimenez (0–1)	**Britton** (9)	33,911	54–56	W1
111	August 6	Tigers	12–3	**Jiménez** (5–7)	Sánchez (3–2)	—	30,144	55–56	W2
112	August 7	@ Angels	6–2	**Bundy** (11–8)	Ramirez (10–10)	—	34,142	56–56	W3
113	August 8	@ Angels	2–3	Bridwell (6–1)	**Hellickson** (7–6)	Middleton (1)	35,723	56–57	L1
114	August 9	@ Angels	1–5	Scribner (2–0)	**Gausman** (8–8)	—	36,202	56–58	L2
115	August 10	@ Athletics	7–2	**Miley** (6–9)	Smith (0–2)	**Britton** (10)	11,386	57–58	W1
116	August 11	@ Athletics	4–5	Casilla (3–5)	**Brach** (3–3)	Treinen (6)	14,330	57–59	L1
117	August 12	@ Athletics	12–5	**Bundy** (12–8)	Manaea (8–7)	—	29,742	58–59	W1
118	August 13	@ Athletics	3–9	Graveman (3–3)	**Hellickson** (7–7)	—	18,912	58–60	L1
119	August 14	@ Mariners	11–3	**Gausman** (9–8)	Gallardo (5–8)	—	17,973	59–60	W1
120	August 15	@ Mariners	1–3	Albers (1–0)	**Miley** (6–10)	Diaz (26)	24,927	59–61	L1
121	August 16	@ Mariners	6–7	Zych (6–3)	**Jiménez** (5–8)	Rzepczynski (1)	33,448	59–62	L2
122	August 18	Angels	9–7	**O'Day** (1–3)	Middleton (4–1)	—	26,185	60–62	W1
123	August 19	Angels	1–5	Ramírez (11–10)	**Gausman** (9–9)	—	43,929	60–63	L1
124	August 20	Angels	4–5	Bedrosian (3–2)	**Brach** (3–3)	Norris (19)	24,715	60–64	L2
125	August 21	Athletics	7–3	**Miley** (7–10)	Smith (0–3)	**Britton** (11)	16,020	61–64	W1
126	August 22	Athletics	4–6	Castro (1–1)	**Jiménez** (5–9)	Treinen (8)	18,493	61–65	L1
127	August 23	Athletics	8–7 (12)	**Castro** (3–1)	Castro (1–2)	—	20,072	62–65	W1
128	August 25	@ Red Sox	16–3	**Hellickson** (8–7)	Porcello (8–15)	—	37,191	63–65	W2
129	August 26	@ Red Sox	7–0	**Gausman** (10–9)	Rodríguez (4–4)	—	36,655	64–65	W3
130	August 27	@ Red Sox	2–1	**Miley** (8–10)	Fister (3–7)	**Brach** (17)	36,625	65–65	W4
131	August 28	Mariners	7–6	**Hart** (2–0)	Pagan (1–3)	**Britton** (12)	15,106	66–65	W5
132	August 29	Mariners	4–0	**Bundy** (13–8)	Ramírez (5–5)	—	13,736	67–65	W6
133	August 30	Mariners	8–7	**Brach** (4–4)	Bergman (4–5)	**Britton** (13)	16,983	68–65	W7
134	August 31	Blue Jays	8–11	Estrada (7–8)	**Hellickson** (8–8)	Osuna (35)	13,802	68–66	L1

September/October: 7–21 (Home: 5–8; Away: 2–13)

#	Date	Opponent	Score	Win	Loss	Save	Attendance	Record	Box/ Streak
135	September 1	Blue Jays	1–0 (13)	**Yacabonis** (1–0)	Loup (2–3)	—	16,627	69–66	W1
136	September 2	Blue Jays	2–7	Dermody (2–0)	**Miley** (8–11)	—	14,815	69–67	L1
137	September 3	Blue Jays	5–4 (12)	**Yacabonis** (2–0)	Barnes (2–6)	—	27,231	70–67	W1
138	September 4	Yankees	4–7	Green (3–0)	**Bundy** (13–9)	—	37,622	70–68	L1
139	September 5	Yankees	7–6	**Britton** (2–0)	Betances (3–6)	—	14,377	71–68	W1
—	September 6	Yankees	Postponed (rain). Makeup date September 7.						
140	September 7	Yankees	1–9	Gray (9–9)	**Gausman** (10–10)	—	14,946	71–69	L1
141	September 8	@ Indians	0–5	Clevinger (9–5)	**Miley** (8–12)	—	30,090	71–70	L2
142	September 9	@ Indians	2–4	Tomlin (9–9)	**Ynoa** (1–1)	Allen (25)	30,459	71–71	L3
143	September 10	@ Indians	2–3	Bauer (16–8)	**Hellickson** (8–9)	Allen (26)	21,259	71–72	L4
144	September 11	@ Blue Jays	3–4	Estrada (8–8)	**Jiménez** (5–10)	Leone (1)	28,401	71–73	L5
145	September 12	@ Blue Jays	2–3	Mayza (1–0)	**Britton** (2–1)	—	29,055	71–74	L6
146	September 13	@ Blue Jays	2–1	**Gausman** (11–10)	Stroman (11–8)	**Britton** (14)	31,714	72–74	W1
147	September 14	@ Yankees	5–13	Tanaka (12–11)	**Miley** (8–13)	—	37,128	72–75	L1
148	September 15	@ Yankees	2–8	Severino (13–6)	**Ynoa** (1–2)	—	40,460	72–76	L2
149	September 16	@ Yankees	3–9	Montgomery (8–7)	**Hellickson** (8–10)	—	40,114	72–77	L3
150	September 17	@ Yankees	6–4	**Jiménez** (6–10)	Gray (9–11)	**Britton** (15)	38,189	73–77	W1
151	September 18	Red Sox	8–10 (10)	Barnes (7–3)	**Castro** (3–2)	Smith (1)	16,716	73–78	L1
152	September 19	Red Sox	0–1 (11)	Kelly (4–1)	**Brach** (4–5)	Barnes (1)	21,449	73–79	L2
153	September 20	Red Sox	0–9	Sale (17–7)	**Miley** (8–14)	—	16,906	73–80	L3
154	September 21	Rays	3–1	**Ynoa** (2–2)	Andriese (5–4)	**Brach** (18)	14,697	74–80	W1
155	September 22	Rays	3–8	Cobb (12–10)	**Jiménez** (6–11)	—	28,835	74–81	L1
156	September 23	Rays	6–9	Odorizzi (10–8)	**Hellickson** (8–11)	Colomé (46)	42,802	74–82	L2
157	September 24	Rays	9–4	**Givens** (8–1)	Archer (9–12)	—	23,242	75–82	W1
158	September 26	@ Pirates	1–10	Williams (7–9)	**Gausman** (11–11)	Brault (1)	19,318	75–83	L1
159	September 27	@ Pirates	3–5	Kuhl (8–11)	**Ynoa** (2–3)	Rivero (20)	24,779	75–84	L2
160	September 29	@ Rays	0–7	Boxberger (4–4)	**Miley** (8–15)	—	21,142	75–85	L3
161	September 30	@ Rays	3–4	Archer (10–12)	**Castro** (3–3)	Colomé (47)	15,416	75–86	L4
162	October 1	@ Rays	0–6	Snell (5–7)	**Gausman** (11–12)	—	16,018	75–87	L5

== Roster ==
2017 Baltimore Orioles
Roster
Pitchers: 64 Jayson Aquino; 51 Alec Asher; 48 Richard Bleier; 35 Brad Brach; 53 Zach Britton; 37 Dylan Bundy; 50 Miguel Castro; 43 Stefan Crichton; 71 Oliver Drake; 39 Kevin Gausman; 60 Mychal Givens; 57,58 Donnie Hart; 58 Jeremy Hellickson; 28 Edwin Jackson; 31 Ubaldo Jiménez; 38 Wade Miley; 52 Vidal Nuño; 56 Darren O'Day; 52 Richard Rodríguez; 66 Tanner Scott; 30 Chris Tillman; 41 Logan Verrett; 63 Tyler Wilson; 59 Mike Wright; 54 Jimmy Yacabonis; 49 Gabriel Ynoa	Catchers: 29 Welington Castillo; 36 Caleb Joseph; 27 Francisco Peña; 15 Chance Sisco; Infielders: 24 Pedro Álvarez; 1 Tim Beckham; 19 Chris Davis; 3 Ryan Flaherty; 15 Johnny Giavotella; 2 J. J. Hardy; 34 Paul Janish; 13 Manny Machado; 6 Jonathan Schoop; 17 Rubén Tejada	Outfielders: 14 Craig Gentry; 18 Austin Hays; 10 Adam Jones; 25 Hyun-soo Kim; 16 Trey Mancini; 23 Joey Rickard; 25 Anthony Santander; 12 Seth Smith; 45 Mark Trumbo; 28 David Washington	Manager: 26 Buck Showalter; Coaches: 88 Howie Clark (assistant hitting); 47 Scott Coolbaugh (hitting); 55 Einar Díaz (coach); 11 Bobby Dickerson (third base); 21 Wayne Kirby (first base); 40 Roger McDowell (pitching); 75 Alan Mills (bullpen); 77 John Russell (bench)

== Player stats ==
=== Batting ===
Note: G = Games played; AB = At bats; R = Runs; H = Hits; 2B = Doubles; 3B = Triples; HR = Home runs; RBI = Runs batted in; SB = Stolen bases; BB = Walks; AVG = Batting average; SLG = Slugging average

Player	G	AB	R	H	2B	3B	HR	RBI	SB	BB	AVG	SLG
Manny Machado	156	630	81	163	33	1	33	95	9	50	.259	.471
Jonathan Schoop	160	622	92	182	35	0	32	105	1	35	.293	.503
Adam Jones	147	597	82	170	28	1	26	73	2	27	.285	.466
Mark Trumbo	146	559	79	131	22	0	23	65	1	42	.234	.397
Trey Mancini	147	543	65	159	26	4	24	78	1	33	.293	.488
Chris Davis	128	456	65	98	15	1	26	61	1	61	.215	.423
Welington Castillo	96	341	44	96	11	0	20	53	0	22	.282	.490
Seth Smith	111	330	50	85	19	0	13	32	2	36	.258	.433
Joey Rickard	111	261	29	63	15	0	4	19	8	9	.241	.345
J.J. Hardy	73	254	24	55	13	1	4	24	0	12	.217	.323
Caleb Joseph	89	254	31	65	14	1	8	28	0	10	.256	.413
Tim Beckham	50	216	36	66	13	2	10	26	1	12	.306	.523
Hyun-soo Kim	56	125	11	29	4	0	1	10	0	12	.232	.288
Rubén Tejada	41	113	17	26	6	0	0	5	0	8	.230	.283
Craig Gentry	77	101	17	26	5	1	2	11	5	11	.257	.386
Austin Hays	20	60	4	13	3	0	1	8	0	2	.217	.317
Ryan Flaherty	23	38	5	8	1	0	0	4	0	4	.211	.237
Pedro Álvarez	14	32	4	10	1	0	1	4	0	2	.313	.438
Anthony Santander	13	30	1	8	3	0	0	2	0	0	.267	.367
Paul Janish	14	26	0	2	0	0	0	3	0	1	.077	.077
Chance Sisco	10	18	3	6	2	0	2	4	0	3	.333	.778
Francisco Peña	5	10	3	5	0	0	2	2	0	0	.500	1.100
Johnny Giavotella	7	10	0	1	0	0	0	0	1	0	.100	.100
David Washington	3	6	0	0	0	0	0	0	0	0	.000	.000
Pitcher totals	162	18	0	2	0	0	0	1	0	0	.111	.111
Team totals	162	5650	743	1469	269	12	232	713	32	392	.260	.435

=== Pitching ===
Note: W = Wins; L = Losses; ERA = Earned run average; G = Games pitched; GS = Games started; SV = Saves; IP = Innings pitched; H = Hits allowed; R = Runs allowed; ER = Earned runs allowed; BB = Walks allowed; SO = Strikeouts

Player	W	L	ERA	G	GS	SV	IP	H	R	ER	BB	SO
Kevin Gausman	11	12	4.68	34	34	0	186.2	208	99	97	71	179
Dylan Bundy	13	9	4.24	28	28	0	169.2	152	82	80	51	152
Wade Miley	8	15	5.61	32	32	0	157.1	179	104	98	93	142
Ubaldo Jiménez	6	11	6.81	31	25	0	142.2	169	109	108	58	139
Chris Tillman	1	7	7.84	24	19	0	93.0	125	86	81	51	63
Mychal Givens	8	1	2.75	69	0	0	78.2	57	24	24	25	88
Brad Brach	4	5	3.18	67	0	18	68.0	51	27	24	26	70
Miguel Castro	3	3	3.53	39	1	0	66.1	53	29	26	28	38
Richard Bleier	2	1	1.99	57	0	0	63.1	62	23	14	13	26
Darren O'Day	2	3	3.43	64	0	2	60.1	41	24	23	24	76
Alec Asher	2	5	5.25	24	6	0	60.0	61	36	35	23	47
Jeremy Hellickson	2	6	6.97	10	10	0	51.2	49	43	40	17	31
Donnie Hart	2	0	3.71	51	0	0	43.2	48	19	18	13	29
Zach Britton	2	1	2.89	38	0	15	37.1	39	12	12	18	29
Gabriel Ynoa	2	3	4.15	9	4	0	34.2	39	17	16	8	26
Mike Wright	0	0	5.76	13	0	0	25.0	26	16	16	7	28
Jimmy Yacabonis	2	0	4.35	14	0	0	20.2	18	10	10	14	8
Tyler Wilson	2	2	7.04	9	1	0	15.1	22	14	12	4	9
Vidal Nuño	0	1	10.43	12	0	0	14.2	23	17	17	10	13
Jayson Aquino	1	2	7.43	4	2	0	13.1	15	12	11	6	13
Stefan Crichton	0	0	8.03	8	0	0	12.1	26	11	11	4	8
Logan Verrett	2	0	4.22	4	0	0	10.2	11	6	5	3	9
Richard Rodríguez	0	0	14.29	5	0	0	5.2	12	9	9	3	3
Edwin Jackson	0	0	7.20	3	0	0	5.0	11	7	4	4	2
Oliver Drake	0	0	8.10	3	0	0	3.1	6	3	3	3	3
Tanner Scott	0	0	10.80	2	0	0	1.2	2	2	2	2	2
Team totals	75	87	4.97	162	162	35	1441.0	1505	841	795	579	1233

== Farm system ==
Level	Team	League	Manager
AAA	Norfolk Tides	International League	Ron Johnson
AA	Bowie Baysox	Eastern League	Gary Kendall
A-Advanced	Frederick Keys	Carolina League	Keith Bodie
A	Delmarva Shorebirds	South Atlantic League	Ryan Minor
Short-Season A	Aberdeen IronBirds	New York–Penn League	Kevin Bradshaw
Rookie	GCL Orioles	Gulf Coast League	Carlos Tosca
Rookie	DSL Orioles	Dominican Summer League	Elvis Morel
