= 2017 Tampa Bay Rays season =

2017 Tampa Bay Rays
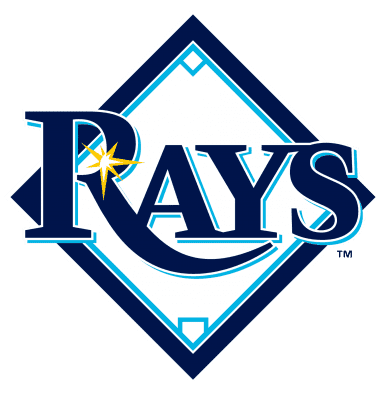
- League: American League
- Division: East
- Ballpark: Tropicana Field
- City: St. Petersburg, Florida
- Record: 80–82 (.494)
- Divisional place: 3rd
- Owners: Stuart Sternberg
- Managers: Kevin Cash
- Television: Fox Sports Sun; Fox Sports Florida (Dewayne Staats, Brian Anderson)
- Radio: Tampa Bay Rays Radio Network (English) (Andy Freed, Dave Wills); WGES (Spanish) (Ricardo Taveras, Enrique Oliu)

The Tampa Bay Rays 2017 season was the Rays' 20th season of Major League Baseball, and the tenth as the "Rays" (all at Tropicana Field). Although they improved upon their record from last season, they still finished in third place in the American League East and did not make the playoffs.

== Season standings ==
=== American League East ===
AL East
Team	W	L	Pct.	GB	Home	Road
Boston Red Sox	93	69	.574	—	48‍–‍33	45‍–‍36
New York Yankees	91	71	.562	2	51‍–‍30	40‍–‍41
Tampa Bay Rays	80	82	.494	13	42‍–‍39	38‍–‍43
Toronto Blue Jays	76	86	.469	17	42‍–‍39	34‍–‍47
Baltimore Orioles	75	87	.463	18	46‍–‍35	29‍–‍52

=== American League Wild Card ===
Division leaders
Team	W	L	Pct.
Cleveland Indians	102	60	.630
Houston Astros	101	61	.623
Boston Red Sox	93	69	.574

Wild Card teams (Top 2 teams qualify for postseason)
Team	W	L	Pct.	GB
New York Yankees	91	71	.562	+6
Minnesota Twins	85	77	.525	—
Kansas City Royals	80	82	.494	5
Los Angeles Angels	80	82	.494	5
Tampa Bay Rays	80	82	.494	5
Seattle Mariners	78	84	.481	7
Texas Rangers	78	84	.481	7
Toronto Blue Jays	76	86	.469	9
Baltimore Orioles	75	87	.463	10
Oakland Athletics	75	87	.463	10
Chicago White Sox	67	95	.414	18
Detroit Tigers	64	98	.395	21

=== Record against opponents ===
2017 American League record Source: MLB Standings Grid – 2017
Team	BAL	BOS	CWS	CLE	DET	HOU	KC	LAA	MIN	NYY	OAK	SEA	TB	TEX	TOR	NL
Baltimore	—	10–9	4–3	1–6	3–4	1–5	3–3	2–4	2–5	7–12	4–3	4–2	8–11	6–1	12–7	8–12
Boston	9–10	—	6–1	4–3	3–4	3–4	2–4	2–4	5–2	8–11	3–4	3–3	11–8	5–1	13–6	16–4
Chicago	3–4	1–6	—	6–13	10–9	4–2	10–9	3–4	7–12	3–4	1–5	3–4	3–3	4–3	3–3	6–14
Cleveland	6–1	3–4	13–6	—	13–6	5–1	12–7	6–0	12–7	5–2	3–4	4–2	4–3	6–1	4–2	6–14
Detroit	4–3	4–3	9–10	6–13	—	3–4	8–11	3–4	8–11	3–3	1–5	1–6	2–5	1–5	3–3	8–12
Houston	5–1	4–3	2–4	1–5	4–3	—	3–4	12–7	5–1	5–2	12–7	14–5	3–4	12–7	4–3	15–5
Kansas City	3–3	4–2	9–10	7–12	11–8	4–3	—	6–1	8–11	2–5	3–3	5–2	4–3	1–6	3–3	9–11
Los Angeles	4–2	4–2	4–3	0–6	4–3	7–12	1–6	—	2–5	4–2	12–7	12–7	3–4	8–11	4–3	11–9
Minnesota	5–2	2–5	12–7	7–12	11–8	1–5	11–8	5–2	—	2–4	3–3	3–4	2–4	4–3	4–3	13–7
New York	12–7	11–8	4–3	2–5	3–3	2–5	5–2	2–4	4–2	—	2–5	5–2	12–7	3–3	9–10	15–5
Oakland	3–4	4–3	5–1	4–3	5–1	7–12	3–3	7–12	3–3	5–2	—	7–12	2–5	10–9	2–5	7–13
Seattle	2–4	3–3	4–3	2–4	6–1	5–14	2–5	7–12	4–3	2–5	12–7	—	5–1	11–8	1–6	12–8
Tampa Bay	11–8	8–11	3–3	3–4	5–2	4–3	3–4	4–3	4–2	7–12	5–2	1–5	—	2–4	9–10	11–9
Texas	1–6	1–5	3–4	1–6	5–1	7–12	6–1	11–8	3–4	3–3	9–10	8–11	4–2	—	3–4	14–6
Toronto	7–12	6–13	3–3	2–4	3–3	3–4	3–3	3–4	3–4	10–9	5–2	6–1	10–9	4–3	—	9–11

== Regular season summary ==
=== Game log ===
Legend
	Rays win
	Rays loss
	Postponement
**Bold**	Rays team member

2017 Game Log: 80–82 (Home: 42–39; Away: 38–43)
April: 12–14 (Home: 9–4; Away: 3–10)

#	Date	Opponent	Score	Win	Loss	Save	Attendance	Record	Streak/Recap
1	April 2	Yankees	7–3	**Archer** (1–0)	Tanaka (0–1)	**Colomé** (1)	31,042	1–0	W1
2	April 4	Yankees	0–5	Sabathia (1–0)	**Odorizzi** (0–1)	—	19,366	1–1	L1
3	April 5	Yankees	4–1	**Cobb** (1–0)	Pineda (0–1)	**Colomé** (2)	12,737	2–1	W1
4	April 6	Blue Jays	2–5	Stroman (1–0)	**Snell** (0–1)	Grilli (1)	12,678	2–2	L1
5	April 7	Blue Jays	10–8	**Cedeño** (1–0)	Howell (0–1)	**Colomé** (3)	12,842	3–2	W1
6	April 8	Blue Jays	3–2 (11)	**Ramírez** (1–0)	Lawrence (0–1)	—	21,838	4–2	W2
7	April 9	Blue Jays	7–2	**Odorizzi** (1–1)	Estrada (0–1)	—	15,341	5–2	W3
8	April 10	@ Yankees	1–8	Pineda (1–1)	**Cobb** (1–1)	—	46,955	5–3	L1
9	April 12	@ Yankees	4–8	Mitchell (1–0)	**Díaz** (0–1)	Chapman (1)	38,002	5–4	L2
10	April 13	@ Yankees	2–3	Severino (1–0)	**Cedeño** (1–1)	Chapman (2)	34,772	5–5	L3
11	April 14	@ Red Sox	10–5	**Archer** (2–0)	Porcello (1–1)	—	36,813	6–5	W1
12	April 15	@ Red Sox	1–2	Sale (1–1)	**Hunter** (0–1)	Kimbrel (4)	36,686	6–6	L1
13	April 16	@ Red Sox	5–7	Kelly (2–0)	**Farquhar** (0–1)	Kimbrel (5)	36,209	6–7	L2
14	April 17	@ Red Sox	3–4	Wright (1–1)	**Snell** (0–2)	Kimbrel (6)	37,318	6–8	L3
15	April 18	Tigers	5–1	**Andriese** (1–0)	Fulmer (1–1)	—	16,265	7–8	W1
16	April 19	Tigers	8–7	**Pruitt** (1–0)	Rodríguez (1–1)	—	12,281	8–8	W2
17	April 20	Tigers	8–1	**Ramírez** (2–0)	Norris (1–1)	—	13,267	9–8	W3
18	April 21	Astros	3–6	Feliz (1–0)	**Cobb** (1–2)	Giles (4)	17,683	9–9	L1
19	April 22	Astros	6–3	**Pruitt** (2–0)	Morton (1–2)	**Colomé** (4)	17,008	10–9	W1
20	April 23	Astros	4–6 (10)	Gregerson (1–1)	**Garton** (0–1)	Giles (5)	15,548	10–10	L1
21	April 24	@ Orioles	3–6	Givens (3–0)	**Archer** (2–1)	Brach (4)	11,142	10–11	L2
22	April 25	@ Orioles	2–0	**Whitley** (1–0)	Miley (1–1)	**Colomé** (5)	11,472	11–11	W1
23	April 26	@ Orioles	4–5 (11)	Asher (1–0)	**Colomé** (0–1)	—	16,289	11–12	L1
24	April 28	@ Blue Jays	7–4	**Pruitt** (3–0)	Grilli (1–3)	**Whitley** (1)	36,256	12–12	W1
25	April 29	@ Blue Jays	1–4	Liriano (2–2)	**Andriese** (1–1)	Osuna (2)	42,419	12–13	L1
26	April 30	@ Blue Jays	1–3	Howell (1–1)	**Colomé** (0–2)	Osuna (3)	42,986	12–14	L2

May: 17–13 (Home: 7–9; Away: 10–4)

#	Date	Opponent	Score	Win	Loss	Save	Attendance	Record	Streak/Recap
27	May 1	@ Marlins	4–2	**Farquhar** (1–1)	Ziegler (1–1)	**Colomé** (6)	16,096	13–14	W1
28	May 2	@ Marlins	3–1	**Cobb** (2–2)	Vólquez (0–4)	**Colomé** (7)	16,011	14–14	W2
29	May 3	Marlins	6–10	Conley (2–2)	**Pruitt** (3–1)	—	12,285	14–15	L1
30	May 4	Marlins	5–1	**Andriese** (2–1)	Straily (1–3)	**Colomé** (8)	10,118	15–15	W1
31	May 5	Blue Jays	4–8	Loup (1–0)	**Díaz** (0–2)	—	12,461	15–16	L1
32	May 6	Blue Jays	6–1	**Odorizzi** (2–1)	Estrada (1–2)	—	12,035	16–16	W1
33	May 7	Blue Jays	1–2	Tepera (2–1)	**Cobb** (2–3)	Osuna (4)	15,068	16–17	L1
34	May 8	Royals	3–7	Karns (2–2)	**Snell** (0–3)	—	12,826	16–18	L2
35	May 9	Royals	6–7 (12)	Junis (1–0)	**Moreno** (0–1)	Herrera (5)	9,921	16–19	L3
36	May 10	Royals	12–1	**Archer** (3–1)	Hammel (1–4)	—	9,320	17–19	W1
37	May 11	Royals	0–6	Vargas (5–1)	**Odorizzi** (2–2)	—	9,340	17–20	L1
38	May 12	@ Red Sox	5–4	**Cobb** (3–3)	Porcello (2–5)	**Colomé** (9)	36,496	18–20	W1
39	May 13	@ Red Sox	3–6	Sale (4–2)	**Snell** (0–4)	Kimbrel (11)	35,447	18–21	L1
40	May 14	@ Red Sox	11–2	**Andriese** (3–1)	Pomeranz (3–3)	—	35,080	19–21	W1
41	May 15	@ Indians	7–8	Logan (1–0)	**Archer** (3–2)	Allen (10)	14,613	19–22	L1
42	May 16	@ Indians	6–4	**Odorizzi** (3–2)	Salazar (2–4)	**Colomé** (10)	18,238	20–22	W1
43	May 17	@ Indians	7–4	**Cobb** (4–3)	Tomlin (2–5)	—	22,104	21–22	W2
44	May 19	Yankees	5–4	**Farquhar** (2–1)	Clippard (0–2)	**Colomé** (11)	21,146	22–22	W3
45	May 20	Yankees	9–5	**Andriese** (4–1)	Tanaka (5–3)	—	22,864	23–22	W4
46	May 21	Yankees	2–3	Sabathia (4–2)	**Archer** (3–3)	Betances (2)	20,873	23–23	L1
47	May 22	Angels	2–3	Ramírez (4–3)	**Díaz** (0–3)	Norris (9)	12,249	23–24	L2
48	May 23	Angels	0–4	Shoemaker (4–2)	**Cobb** (4–4)	—	9,014	23–25	L3
49	May 24	Angels	5–2	**Ramírez** (3–0)	Nolasco (2–4)	**Colomé** (12)	9,975	24–25	W1
50	May 25	Angels	4–0	**Andriese** (5–1)	Wright (0–1)	—	9,459	25–25	W2
51	May 26	@ Twins	5–2	**Archer** (4–3)	Santiago (4–3)	**Colomé** (13)	20,949	26–25	W3
52	May 27	@ Twins	3–5	Rogers (2–1)	**Farquhar** (2–2)	Kintzler (13)	27,530	26–26	L1
53	May 28	@ Twins	8–6 (15)	**Colomé** (1–2)	Santiago (4–4)	**Ramírez** (1)	28,951	27–26	W1
54	May 29	@ Rangers	10–8	**De León** (1–0)	Barnette (1–1)	**Colomé** (14)	35,914	28–26	W2
55	May 30	@ Rangers	5–9	Kela (2–1)	**Whitley** (1–1)	—	22,942	28–27	L1
56	May 31	@ Rangers	7–5 (10)	**Pruitt** (4–1)	Dyson (1–6)	**Colomé** (15)	24,410	29–27	W1

June: 13–13 (Home: 8–5; Away: 5–8)

#	Date	Opponent	Score	Win	Loss	Save	Attendance	Record	Streak/Recap
57	June 2	@ Mariners	4–12	Bergman (3–2)	**Odorizzi** (3–3)	—	27,933	29–28	L1
58	June 3	@ Mariners	2–9	Gaviglio (2–1)	**Cobb** (4–5)	—	26,995	29–29	L2
59	June 4	@ Mariners	1–7	Miranda (6–2)	**Ramírez** (3–1)	—	28,579	29–30	L3
60	June 6	White Sox	2–4	Beck (1–0)	**Archer** (4–4)	Robertson (9)	14,590	29–31	L4
61	June 7	White Sox	3–1	**Faria** (1–0)	Pelfrey (2–5)	**Colomé** (16)	9,313	30–31	W1
62	June 8	White Sox	7–5	**Odorizzi** (4–3)	Holland (4–6)	**Colomé** (17)	8,971	31–31	W2
63	June 9	Athletics	13–4	**Cobb** (5–5)	Triggs (5–6)	—	13,153	32–31	W3
64	June 10 (1)	Athletics	6–5 (10)	**Pruitt** (5–1)	Hendriks (2–1)	—	17,775	33–31	W4
65	June 10 (2)	Athletics	2–7	Manaea (6–3)	**Hu** (0–1)	—	17,775	33–32	L1
66	June 11	Athletics	5–4	**Whitley** (2–1)	Coulombe (0–1)	**Colomé** (18)	13,640	34–32	W1
67	June 13	@ Blue Jays	8–1	**Faria** (2–0)	Estrada (4–5)	—	39,404	35–32	W2
68	June 14	@ Blue Jays	6–7	Smith (3–0)	**Alvarado** (0–1)	Osuna (17)	37,734	35–33	L1
69	June 15	@ Tigers	3–5	Wilson (3–2)	**Hunter** (0–2)	—	24,056	35–34	L2
70	June 16	@ Tigers	4–13	Norris (4–4)	**Ramírez** (3–2)	—	29,674	35–35	L3
71	June 17	@ Tigers	3–2	**Archer** (5–4)	Fulmer (6–5)	**Colomé** (19)	33,478	36–35	W1
72	June 18	@ Tigers	9–1	**Faria** (3–0)	Farmer (2–1)	—	36,442	37–35	W2
73	June 19	Reds	3–7	Lorenzen (4–2)	**Alvarado** (0–2)	—	17,117	37–36	L1
74	June 20	Reds	6–5	**Cobb** (6–5)	Garrett (3–6)	**Colomé** (20)	13,375	38–36	W1
75	June 21	Reds	8–3	**Ramírez** (4–2)	Adleman (4–4)	**Whitley** (2)	19,619	39–36	W2
76	June 23	Orioles	15–5	**Archer** (6–4)	Jiménez (2–3)	**Pruitt** (1)	18,929	40–36	W3
77	June 24	Orioles	3–8	Bundy (8–6)	**Alvarado** (0–3)	—	23,902	40–37	L1
78	June 25	Orioles	5–8	Brach (2–1)	**Colomé** (1–3)	—	15,943	40–38	L2
79	June 27	@ Pirates	4–2 (10)	**Colomé** (2–3)	Rivero (3–2)	**Hunter** (1)	20,424	41–38	W1
80	June 28	@ Pirates	2–6	Nova (8–5)	**Snell** (0–5)	—	21,582	41–39	L1
81	June 29	@ Pirates	0–4	Taillon (4–2)	**Archer** (6–5)	—	22,595	41–40	L2
82	June 30	@ Orioles	6–4 (10)	**Díaz** (1–3)	O'Day (1–2)	**Colomé** (21)	24,398	42–40	W1

July: 12–13 (Home: 5–5; Away: 7–8)

#	Date	Opponent	Score	Win	Loss	Save	Attendance	Record	Streak/Recap
83	July 1	@ Orioles	10–3	**Odorizzi** (5–3)	Bundy (8–7)	—	28,346	43–40	W2
84	July 2	@ Orioles	1–7	Gausman (5–7)	**Cobb** (6–6)	—	26,489	43–41	L1
85	July 4	@ Cubs	6–5	**Archer** (7–5)	Lester (5–5)	**Colomé** (22)	42,046	44–41	W1
86	July 5	@ Cubs	3–7	Strop (3–2)	**Ramírez** (4–3)	—	39,855	44–42	L1
87	July 6	Red Sox	4–1	**Faria** (4–0)	Sale (11–4)	**Colomé** (23)	23,375	45–42	W1
88	July 7	Red Sox	3–8	Pomeranz (9–4)	**Odorizzi** (5–4)	—	24,842	45–43	L1
89	July 8	Red Sox	1–0	**Cobb** (7–6)	Porcello (4–11)	**Colomé** (24)	23,419	46–43	W1
90	July 9	Red Sox	5–3	**Boxberger** (1–0)	Kelly (3–1)	**Colomé** (25)	20,812	47–43	W2
**88th All-Star Game in Miami, Florida**
91	July 14	@ Angels	2–1 (10)	**Boxberger** (1–1)	Bedrosian (2–1)	**Colomé** (26)	38,119	48–43	W3
92	July 15	@ Angels	6–3	**Cobb** (8–6)	Ramírez (8–8)	—	38,515	49–43	W4
93	July 16	@ Angels	3–4	Hernandez (1–0)	**Díaz** (1–4)	Norris (14)	36,178	49–44	L1
94	July 17	@ Athletics	3–2	**Odorizzi** (6–4)	Gossett (1–5)	**Colomé** (27)	9,736	50–44	W1
95	July 18	@ Athletics	4–3	**Kolarek** (1–0)	Casilla (2–4)	**Colomé** (28)	15,231	51–44	W2
96	July 19	@ Athletics	2–7	Gray (6–4)	**Faria** (4–1)	—	17,019	51–45	L1
97	July 21	Rangers	3–4 (10)	Claudio (2–0)	**Boxberger** (2–1)	—	24,461	51–46	L2
98	July 22	Rangers	3–4	Cashner (5–8)	**Archer** (7–6)	Claudio (4)	20,568	51–47	L3
99	July 23	Rangers	5–6	Bush (3–4)	**Boxberger** (2–2)	Leclerc (2)	16,954	51–48	L4
100	July 24	Orioles	0–5	Gausman (7–7)	**Snell** (0–6)	—	15,187	51–49	L5
101	July 25	Orioles	5–4	**Faria** (5–1)	Miley (4–9)	**Colomé** (29)	12,471	52–49	W1
102	July 26	Orioles	5–1	**Cobb** (9–6)	Jiménez (4–7)	—	18,430	53–49	W2
103	July 27	@ Yankees	5–6 (11)	Chapman (3–1)	**Kittredge** (0–1)	—	44,033	53–50	L1
104	July 28	@ Yankees	1–6	Tanaka (8–9)	**Pruitt** (5–2)	—	40,470	53–51	L2
105	July 29	@ Yankees	4–5	Chapman (4–1)	**Boxberger** (2–3)	—	43,015	53–52	L3
106	July 30	@ Yankees	5–3	**Cishek** (2–1)	Montgomery (7–6)	**Colomé** (30)	41,547	54–52	W1
107	July 31	@ Astros	7–14	Morton (9–4)	**Cobb** (9–7)	—	24,154	54–53	L1

August: 13–15 (Home: 5–10; Away: 8–5)

#	Date	Opponent	Score	Win	Loss	Save	Attendance	Record	Streak/Recap
108	August 1	@ Astros	6–4	**Archer** (8–6)	Fiers (7–6)	**Colomé** (31)	22,985	55–53	W1
109	August 2	@ Astros	3–0	**Pruitt** (6–2)	Keuchel (9–1)	**Colomé** (32)	26,722	56–53	W2
110	August 3	@ Astros	5–3	**Boxberger** (3–3)	Liriano (6–6)	**Colomé** (33)	23,404	57–53	W3
111	August 4	Brewers	0–2	Woodruff (1–0)	**Faria** (5–2)	Knebel (21)	21,164	57–54	L1
112	August 5	Brewers	0–3	Davies (13–5)	**Cobb** (9–8)	Swarzak (2)	15,849	57–55	L2
113	August 6	Brewers	2–1	**Hunter** (1–2)	Barnes (3–3)	—	12,129	58–55	W1
114	August 8	Red Sox	0–2	Sale (14–4)	**Pruitt** (6–3)	Kimbrel (28)	22,328	58–56	L1
115	August 9	Red Sox	2–8	Porcello (6–14)	**Odorizzi** (6–5)	—	11,853	58–57	L2
116	August 10	Indians	4–1	**Hunter** (2–2)	Goody (1–2)	**Colomé** (34)	9,533	59–57	W1
117	August 11	Indians	0–5	Carrasco (11–5)	**Faria** (5–3)	—	16,794	59–58	L1
118	August 12	Indians	0–3	Clevinger (6–4)	**Archer** (8–7)	Allen (20)	22,024	59–59	L2
119	August 13	Indians	3–4	Kluber (11–3)	**Hunter** (2–3)	Allen (21)	17,775	59–60	L3
120	August 14	@ Blue Jays	1–2	Tepesch (1–2)	**Odorizzi** (6–6)	Osuna (30)	32,151	59–61	L4
121	August 15	@ Blue Jays	6–4	**Snell** (1–6)	Estrada (5–8)	**Colomé** (35)	33,178	60–61	W1
122	August 16	@ Blue Jays	2–3	Stroman (11–6)	**Faria** (5–4)	Osuna (31)	36,784	60–62	L1
123	August 17	@ Blue Jays	3–5	Leone (3–0)	**Hunter** (2–4)	Osuna (32)	46,855	60–63	L2
124	August 18	Mariners	1–7	Ramírez (5–4)	**Pruitt** (6–4)	—	11,501	60–64	L3
125	August 19	Mariners	6–7	Miranda (8–6)	**Odorizzi** (6–7)	Díaz (27)	12,218	60–65	L4
126	August 20	Mariners	3–0	**Snell** (2–6)	Gallardo (5–9)	**Colomé** (36)	13,354	61–65	W1
127	August 22	Blue Jays	6–5	**Archer** (9–7)	Rowley (1–1)	**Colomé** (37)	11,948	62–65	W2
128	August 23	Blue Jays	6–7	Tepera (7–1)	**Hunter** (2–5)	Osuna (33)	8,264	62–66	L1
129	August 24	Blue Jays	2–0	**Cishek** (3–1)	Koehler (1–6)	**Colomé** (38)	10,133	63–66	W1
130	August 25	@ Cardinals	7–3	**Romo** (2–1)	Wacha (9–7)	—	40,050	64–66	W2
131	August 26	@ Cardinals	4–6	Lyons (2–0)	**Boxberger** (3–4)		41,295	64–67	L1
132	August 27	@ Cardinals	3–2 (10)	**Romo** (3–1)	Tuivailala (3–3)	**Colomé** (39)	44,469	65–67	W1
133	August 28	@ Royals	12–0	**Pruitt** (7–3)	Kennedy (4–10)	**Andriese** (1)	21,866	66–67	W2
134	August 29	@ Royals	2–6	Junis (6–2)	**Cobb** (9–9)	—	25,204	66–68	L1
135	August 30	@ Royals	5–3	**Odorizzi** (7–7)	Vargas (14–9)	**Colomé** (40)	25,916	67–68	W1

September/October: 13–14 (Home: 8–6; Away: 5–8)

#	Date	Opponent	Score	Win	Loss	Save	Attendance	Record	Streak/Recap
136	September 1	@ White Sox	3–1	**Snell** (3–6)	López (0–2)	**Colomé** (41)	13,585	68–68	W2
137	September 2	@ White Sox	4–5	Fulmer (1–1)	**Archer** (9–8)	Minaya (4)	17,700	68–69	L1
138	September 3	@ White Sox	2–6	Giolito (2–1)	**Andriese** (5–2)	—	17,633	68–70	L2
139	September 4	Twins	11–4	**Cobb** (10–9)	Berríos (12–7)	—	12,108	69–70	W1
140	September 5	Twins	2–1	**Odorizzi** (8–7)	Colón (6–11)	**Colomé** (42)	6,509	70–70	W2
141	September 6	Twins	6–10	Rogers (6–3)	**Cishek** (3–2)	—	7,185	70–71	L1
142	September 8	@ Red Sox	3–9	Pomeranz (15–5)	**Archer** (9–9)	—	34,781	70–72	L2
143	September 9	@ Red Sox	0–9	Sale (16–7)	**Andriese** (5–3)	—	36,734	70–73	L3
144	September 10	@ Red Sox	4–1	**Cobb** (11–9)	Porcello (9–17)	**Colomé** (43)	35,859	71–73	W1
145	September 11	Yankees (Note: Games moved to Citi Field for safety concerns due to Hurricane Irma.)	1–5	Robertson (8–2)	**Odorizzi** (8–8)	—	15,327	71–74	L1
146	September 12	Yankees	2–1	**Hunter** (3–5)	Gray (9–10)	**Colomé** (44)	21,024	72–74	W1
147	September 13	Yankees	2–3	Green (5–0)	**Archer** (9–10)	Chapman (18)	13,159	72–75	L1
148	September 15	Red Sox	6–13 (15)	Workman (1–1)	**Pruitt** (7–4)	—	16,006	72–76	L2
149	September 16	Red Sox	1–3	Porcello (10–17)	**Cobb** (11–10)	Kimbrel (33)	14,942	72–77	L3
150	September 17	Red Sox	3–2	**Odorizzi** (9–8)	Rodríguez (5–6)	**Colomé** (45)	14,936	73–77	W1
151	September 19	Cubs	1–2	Montgomery (7–8)	**Archer** (9–11)	Davis (32)	25,046	73–78	L1
152	September 20	Cubs	8–1	**Snell** (4–6)	Lester (11–8)	—	24,238	74–78	W1
153	September 21	@ Orioles	1–3	Ynoa (2–2)	**Andriese** (5–4)	Brach (18)	14,697	74–79	L1
154	September 22	@ Orioles	8–3	**Cobb** (12–10)	Jiménez (6–11)	—	28,835	75–79	W1
155	September 23	@ Orioles	9–6	**Odorizzi** (10–8)	Hellickson (8–11)	**Colomé** (46)	42,802	76–79	W2
156	September 24	@ Orioles	4–9	Givens (8–1)	**Archer** (9–12)	—	23,424	76–80	L1
157	September 26	@ Yankees	1–6	Montgomery (9–7)	**Snell** (4–7)	—	30,434	76–81	L2
158	September 27	@ Yankees	1–6	Severino (14–6)	**Andriese** (5–5)	—	30,549	76–82	L3
159	September 28	@ Yankees	9–6	**Hu** (1–1)	Gray (10–12)	—	32,933	77–82	W1
160	September 29	Orioles	7–0	**Boxberger** (4–4)	Miley (8–15)	—	21,142	78–82	W2
161	September 30	Orioles	4–3	**Archer** (10–12)	Castro (3–3)	**Colomé** (47)	15,416	79–82	W3
162	October 1	Orioles	6–0	**Snell** (5–7)	Gausman (11–12)	—	16,018	80–82	W4

Legend: = Win = Loss = Postponement
Bold = Rays team member

== Roster ==
2017 Tampa Bay Rays
Roster
Pitchers: 46 José Alvarado; 35 Matt Andriese; 22 Chris Archer; 26 Brad Boxberger; 31 Xavier Cedeño; 33 Steve Cishek; 53 Alex Cobb; 37 Álex Colomé; 87 José De León; 17 Jumbo Díaz; 34 Jake Faria; 43 Danny Farquhar; 52 Ryan Garton; 58 Chih-Wei Hu; 49 Tommy Hunter; 43 Dan Jennings; 36 Andrew Kittredge; 55 Adam Kolarek; 59 Justin Marks; 64 Diego Moreno; 23 Jake Odorizzi; 50 Austin Pruitt; 30 Erasmo Ramírez; 52 Chaz Roe; 54 Sergio Romo; 4 Blake Snell; 59 Ryne Stanek; 47 Chase Whitley; 54 Hunter Wood	Catchers: 19 Curt Casali; 33 Derek Norris; 40 Wilson Ramos; 45 Jesús Sucre; Infielders: 1 Tim Beckham; 8 Danny Espinosa; 21 Lucas Duda; 17,21 Taylor Featherston; 3 Evan Longoria; 11 Adeiny Hechavarria; 2 Michael Martínez; 13 Brad Miller; 7 Logan Morrison; 14 Trevor Plouffe; 29 Daniel Robertson; 8 Rickie Weeks	Outfielders: 18 Peter Bourjos; 10 Corey Dickerson; 39 Kevin Kiermaier; 2 Shane Peterson; 30 César Puello; 28 Colby Rasmus; 0 Mallex Smith; 20 Steven Souza	Manager: 16 Kevin Cash; Coaches: 15 Rocco Baldelli (first base/outfield/baserunning); 41 Stan Boroski (bullpen); 77 Scott Cursi (bullpen catcher); 99 Misha Dworken (bullpen catcher); 6 Tom Foley (bench/infield); 48 Jim Hickey (pitching); 51 Chad Mottola (hitting); 25 Charlie Montoyo (third base); 44 Jamie Nelson (assistant hitting/catching)

== Player stats ==
=== Batting ===
Note: G = Games played; AB = At bats; R = Runs; H = Hits; 2B = Doubles; 3B = Triples; HR = Home runs; RBI = Runs batted in; SB = Stolen bases; BB = Walks; AVG = Batting average; SLG = Slugging average

Player	G	AB	R	H	2B	3B	HR	RBI	SB	BB	AVG	SLG
Evan Longoria	156	613	71	160	36	2	20	86	6	46	.261	.424
Corey Dickerson	150	588	84	166	33	4	27	62	4	35	.282	.490
Steven Souza Jr.	148	523	78	125	21	2	30	78	16	84	.239	.459
Logan Morrison	149	512	75	126	22	1	38	85	2	81	.246	.516
Kevin Kiermaier	98	380	56	105	15	3	15	39	16	31	.276	.450
Brad Miller	110	338	43	68	13	3	9	40	5	63	.201	.337
Tim Beckham	87	317	31	82	5	3	12	36	5	24	.259	.407
Adeiny Hechavarria	77	265	29	68	12	4	7	24	4	12	.257	.411
Mallex Smith	81	256	33	69	8	4	2	12	16	23	.270	.355
Daniel Robertson	75	218	22	45	7	2	5	19	1	29	.206	.326
Wilson Ramos	64	208	19	54	6	0	11	35	0	10	.260	.447
Peter Bourjos	100	188	27	42	9	3	5	15	5	12	.223	.383
Derek Norris	53	179	21	36	5	0	9	24	1	12	.201	.380
Jesús Sucre	62	176	20	45	6	0	7	29	2	7	.256	.409
Lucas Duda	52	171	20	30	7	0	13	27	0	23	.175	.444
Colby Rasmus	37	121	17	34	7	1	9	23	1	7	.281	.579
Trevor Plouffe	42	101	9	17	2	0	2	5	0	12	.168	.248
Rickie Weeks Jr.	37	97	13	21	6	0	2	8	1	12	.216	.340
Shane Peterson	30	79	9	20	5	0	2	11	2	5	.253	.392
Taylor Featherston	17	39	6	7	1	0	2	6	1	5	.179	.359
César Puello	16	30	6	6	0	0	0	2	0	4	.200	.200
Michael Martinez	13	26	1	2	0	0	0	0	0	3	.077	.077
Danny Espinosa	8	22	1	6	0	0	0	0	0	1	.273	.273
Curt Casali	9	9	2	3	0	0	1	3	0	3	.333	.667
Pitcher totals	162	22	1	3	0	0	0	2	0	1	.136	.136
Team totals	162	5478	694	1340	226	32	228	671	88	545	.245	.422

=== Pitching ===
Note: W = Wins; L = Losses; ERA = Earned run average; G = Games pitched; GS = Games started; SV = Saves; IP = Innings pitched; H = Hits allowed; R = Runs allowed; ER = Earned runs allowed; BB = Walks allowed; SO = Strikeouts

Player	W	L	ERA	G	GS	SV	IP	H	R	ER	BB	SO
Chris Archer	10	12	4.07	34	34	0	201.0	193	101	91	60	249
Alex Cobb	12	10	3.66	29	29	0	179.1	175	78	73	44	128
Jake Odorizzi	10	8	4.14	28	28	0	143.1	117	80	66	61	127
Blake Snell	5	7	4.04	24	24	0	129.1	113	65	58	59	119
Jake Faria	5	4	3.43	16	14	0	86.2	71	35	33	31	84
Matt Andriese	5	5	4.50	18	17	1	86.0	90	48	43	28	76
Austin Pruitt	7	5	5.31	30	8	1	83.0	103	55	49	22	66
Erasmo Ramirez	4	3	4.80	26	8	1	69.1	66	39	37	16	55
Alex Colomé	2	3	3.24	65	0	47	66.2	57	27	24	23	58
Tommy Hunter	3	5	2.61	61	0	1	58.2	43	18	17	14	64
Chase Whitley	2	1	4.08	41	0	2	57.1	48	29	26	16	43
Danny Farquhar	2	2	4.11	37	0	0	35.0	28	16	16	22	33
Sergio Romo	2	0	1.47	25	0	0	30.2	19	6	5	7	28
Jumbo Díaz	1	4	5.70	31	0	0	30.0	32	20	19	15	28
José Alvarado	0	3	3.64	35	0	0	29.2	24	12	12	9	29
Brad Boxberger	4	4	3.38	30	0	0	29.1	23	11	11	11	40
Steve Cishek	2	1	1.09	26	0	0	24.2	13	3	3	7	26
Ryne Stanek	0	0	5.85	21	0	0	20.0	26	13	13	12	29
Dan Jennings	0	0	3.44	29	0	0	18.1	18	7	7	12	13
Andrew Kittredge	0	1	1.76	15	0	0	15.1	13	4	3	6	14
Ryan Garton	0	1	8.71	7	0	0	10.1	13	10	10	5	9
Chih-Wei Hu	1	1	2.70	6	0	0	10.0	5	4	3	4	9
Chaz Roe	0	0	1.04	9	0	0	8.2	4	1	1	3	12
Adam Kolarek	1	0	6.48	12	0	0	8.1	9	6	6	4	4
Diego Moreno	0	1	4.76	5	0	0	5.2	6	4	3	2	6
Xavier Cedeño	1	1	12.00	9	0	0	3.0	7	5	4	4	0
José De León	1	0	10.13	1	0	0	2.2	4	3	3	3	2
Justin Marks	0	0	6.75	1	0	0	1.1	2	1	1	1	1
Jesús Sucre	0	0	27.00	1	0	0	1.0	2	3	3	2	0
Hunter Wood	0	0	0.00	1	0	0	0.1	0	0	0	0	0
Team totals	80	82	3.97	162	162	53	1445.0	1324	704	638	503	1352

== Farm system ==
Level	Team	League	Manager
AAA	Durham Bulls	International League	Jared Sandberg
AA	Montgomery Biscuits	Southern League	Brady Williams
A	Charlotte Stone Crabs	Florida State League	Michael Johns
A	Bowling Green Hot Rods	Midwest League	Reinaldo Ruiz
A-Short Season	Hudson Valley Renegades	New York–Penn League	Tim Parenton
Rookie	Princeton Rays	Appalachian League	Danny Sheaffer
Rookie	GCL Rays	Gulf Coast League	Jim Morrison
Rookie	DSL Rays 1	Dominican Summer League	
Rookie	DSL Rays 2	Dominican Summer League	
