= Tommy Hunter (baseball) =

American baseball player (born 1986)

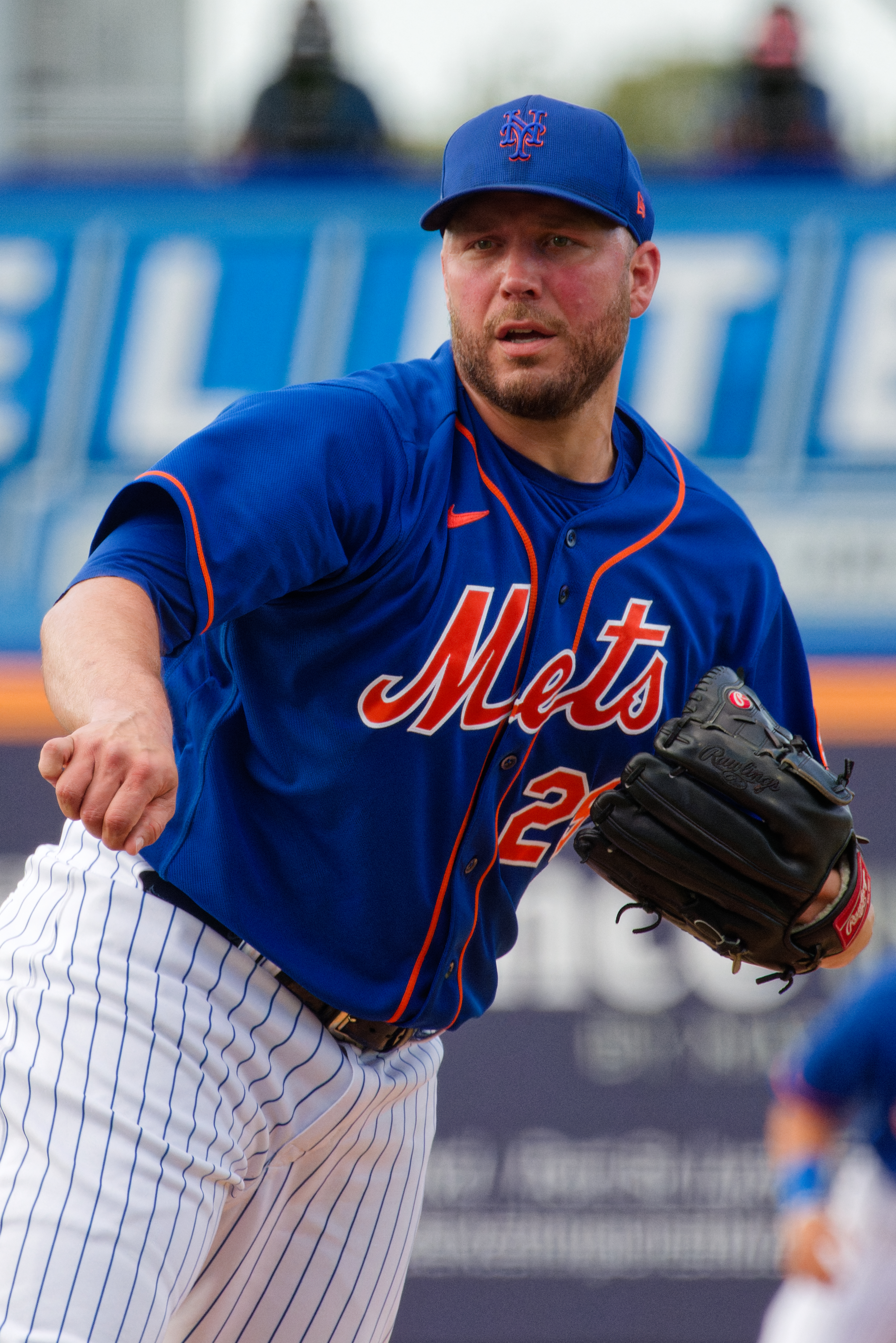
- Hunter with the New York Mets in 2023
- Pitcher
- Born: July 3, 1986 (age 40); Indianapolis, Indiana, U.S.
- Batted: Right Threw: Right

MLB debut
- August 1, 2008, for the Texas Rangers

Last MLB appearance
- June 9, 2023, for the New York Mets

MLB statistics
- Win–loss record: 56–47
- Earned run average: 4.07
- Strikeouts: 639
- Stats at Baseball Reference

Teams
- Texas Rangers (2008–2011); Baltimore Orioles (2011–2015); Chicago Cubs (2015); Cleveland Indians (2016); Baltimore Orioles (2016); Tampa Bay Rays (2017); Philadelphia Phillies (2018–2020); New York Mets (2021–2023)
Medals
Men's baseball
Representing United States
World University Championship
Gold medal – first place	2006 Havana	National team

Raymond Thomas Hunter (born July 3, 1986) is an American former professional baseball pitcher. He played in Major League Baseball (MLB) for the Texas Rangers, Baltimore Orioles, Chicago Cubs, Cleveland Indians, Tampa Bay Rays, Philadelphia Phillies, and New York Mets.

Hunter was drafted by the Rangers in the supplemental first round of the 2007 MLB draft out of the University of Alabama. He made his major league debut in 2008. In 2010 he led the American League with a .765 winning percentage, as he had a 13–4 win–loss record.

== Early and personal life ==
Hunter was born to Ray and Pam Hunter in Indianapolis, Indiana, and raised there with his older sister Megan. Hunter attended Cathedral High School, where he was a two-time All-City Player of the Year (2004 and 2005) . He played both baseball and football for the school. He was also a two-time Junior Olympic judo champion.

Hunter married girlfriend Ellen Cohara on January 4, 2014. They have two sons, Henry and Oliver. His nickname is "Two Towels" which was featured on the back of his jersey during Players Weekend.

== College ==
Hunter attended the University of Alabama for two years. At Alabama, Hunter played for the Alabama Crimson Tide and was a Second-Team All-American in his freshman season, during which the team won the 2006 Southeastern Conference Championship, and a pre-season All-American entering his sophomore season. He also earned a gold medal at the World University Baseball Championship with the USA National Baseball Team in 2006.

== Major league career ==
=== Texas Rangers ===
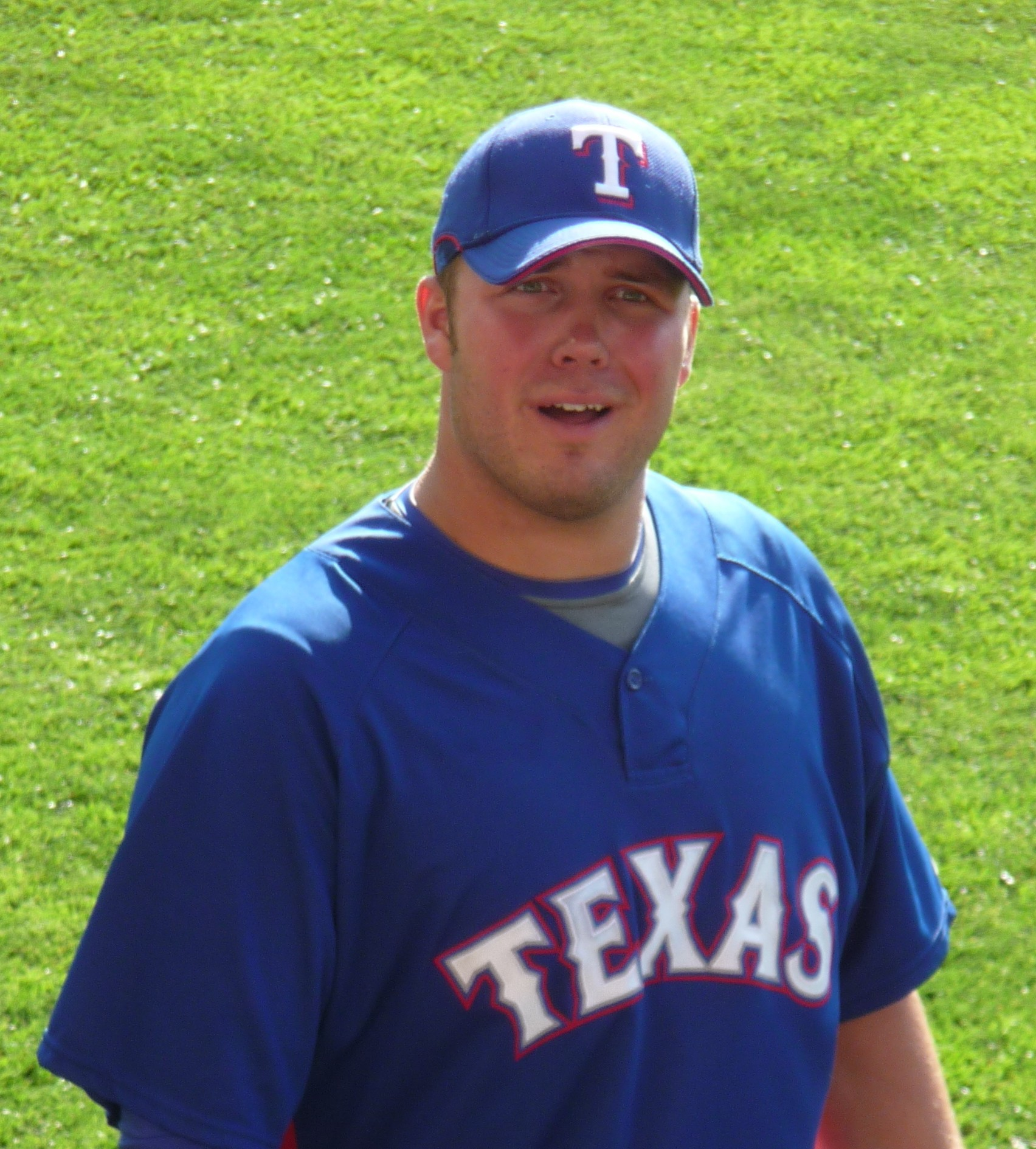
Hunter with the Texas Rangers

Hunter was drafted by the Texas Rangers in the supplemental first round of the 2007 Major League Baseball draft out of the University of Alabama, and signed for a $585,000 signing bonus. The Rangers were awarded a compensatory pick when Mark DeRosa left to go to the Chicago Cubs in free agency.

Hunter made his major league debut on August 1, 2008, taking on the Toronto Blue Jays as the fourth-youngest player in the American League shortly after turning 22 years of age. He pitched 11 innings for the Rangers in 2008. He recorded his first MLB win on July 3, 2009, against the Tampa Bay Rays. Hunter recorded his first Major League complete game on September 13 against the Seattle Mariners. On October 3 Hunter gave up Ken Griffey Jr.'s 630th career home run.

In 2009, Hunter was 9–6 with a 4.10 ERA, with 64 strikeouts in 112 innings. He held right-handed hitters to a .228 batting average (seventh-lowest in the AL), and opponents at home to a .226 average (the lowest single-season figure ever by a pitcher with at least 10 starts at Rangers Ballpark).

Hunter made his 2010 season debut on June 5, pitching a complete game win against the Tampa Bay Rays. He went 13–4 for the season (an American League-leading .765 win–loss percentage), with a 3.73 ERA as he struck out 68 batters in 128 innings. His 13 wins tied Derek Holland for the most wins by any pitcher in the Rangers organization in 2010, in either the major or minor leagues. Hunter started Game 4 of the ALCS vs the Yankees.

In 2011 with the Rangers, Hunter was 1–1 with a 2.93 ERA, and struck out 10 batters in 15.1 innings.

=== Baltimore Orioles ===
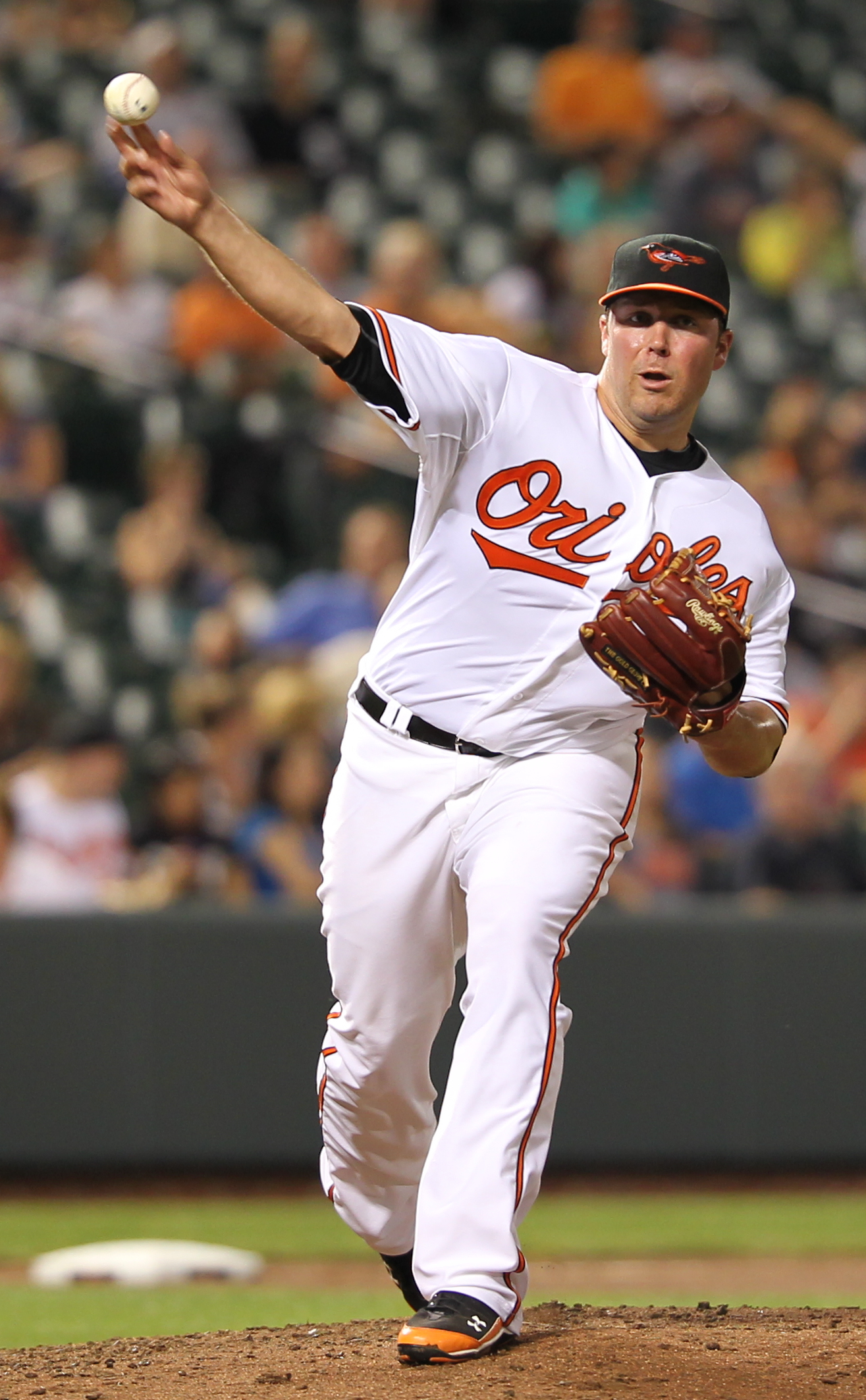
Hunter with the Baltimore Orioles

On July 30, 2011, the Rangers traded Hunter and first baseman Chris Davis to the Baltimore Orioles for reliever Koji Uehara. In 2011 with Baltimore, he was 3–3 with a 5.06 ERA, with 35 strikeouts in 69.1 innings.

In the 2012 season, Hunter posted a 7–8 record with a 5.45 ERA, with 77 strikeouts in 133.2 innings. He was a starter for a while, but was optioned to Triple A Norfolk. He was placed in the bullpen as a reliever. As a reliever, Hunter's fastball averaged 96 MPH over the month of September, and topped out at 100 MPH, after averaging 91–92 MPH for his career. In 2013, he was 6–5 with four saves and a 2.81 ERA and 68 strikeouts in 68.1 innings in 68 games, and held right-handed batters to a batting line of .141/.190/.154 in 159 plate appearances.

After former closer Jim Johnson was traded to the Oakland Athletics, Hunter was named the Orioles' new closer for the 2014 season. Hunter started the 2014 season as the Orioles' closer and was successful in 11 of his 12 save opportunities, but he blew two consecutive saves on May 10 and 13 and then was placed on the 15-day disabled list. When he returned, he continued to work out of the bullpen, but not as the closer. For the 2014 season, Hunter finished 3–2 with 11 saves and a 2.97 ERA and 45 strikeouts in 60.2 innings in 60 games. He agreed to a one-year deal worth $4.65 million in January 2015, avoiding arbitration.

Hunter was 2–2 with Baltimore in 2015 with a 3.63 ERA with 32 strikeouts in 44.2 innings.

=== Chicago Cubs ===
On July 31, 2015, Hunter was traded to the Chicago Cubs for outfielder Junior Lake. He was 2–0 with one save with the Cubs with a 5.74 ERA with 15 strikeouts in 15.2 innings. After the season, he had two surgeries to repair a core muscle injury.

=== Cleveland Indians ===
Hunter signed a one-year contract worth $2 million with the Cleveland Indians on February 12, 2016. He was placed on the injured list on July 17 after suffering a non-displaced fracture in his back following a fall at his home. On August 25, Hunter was released. He was 2–2 with the Indians with a 3.74 ERA with 17 strikeouts in 21.2 innings.

=== Baltimore Orioles (second stint) ===
The Baltimore Orioles signed Hunter on August 28, 2016. He was 0–0 with the Orioles with a 2.19 ERA in 12 games.

=== Tampa Bay Rays ===
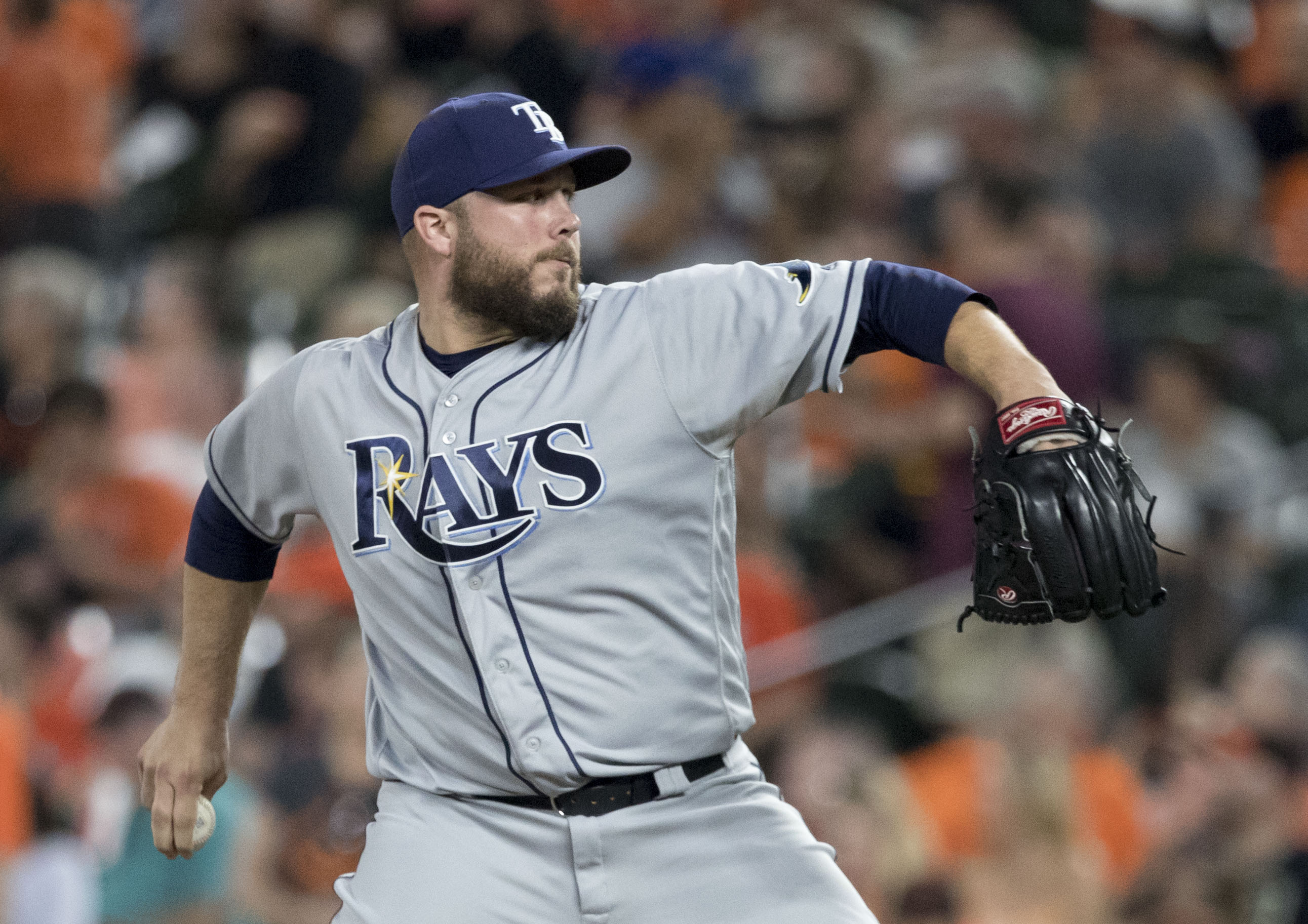
Hunter in 2017

On February 22, 2017, Hunter signed a minor league deal with the Tampa Bay Rays. Hunter impressed in spring training and received a spot in the bullpen. He had an ERA of 1.08 in 10 appearances before suffering a calf injury after running to first base on a ball in play. On April 23, Hunter was placed on the 10-Day DL. He was activated off the DL on May 25.

Hunter finished the season with a 3–5 record with one save and 25 holds (fifth in the AL) in 61 appearances with a 2.61 ERA (a career low), pitching predominantly in the eighth inning before closer Alex Colomé. He held all hitters to a .202/.254/.333 batting line as he struck out 64 batters in 58.2 innings.

=== Philadelphia Phillies ===
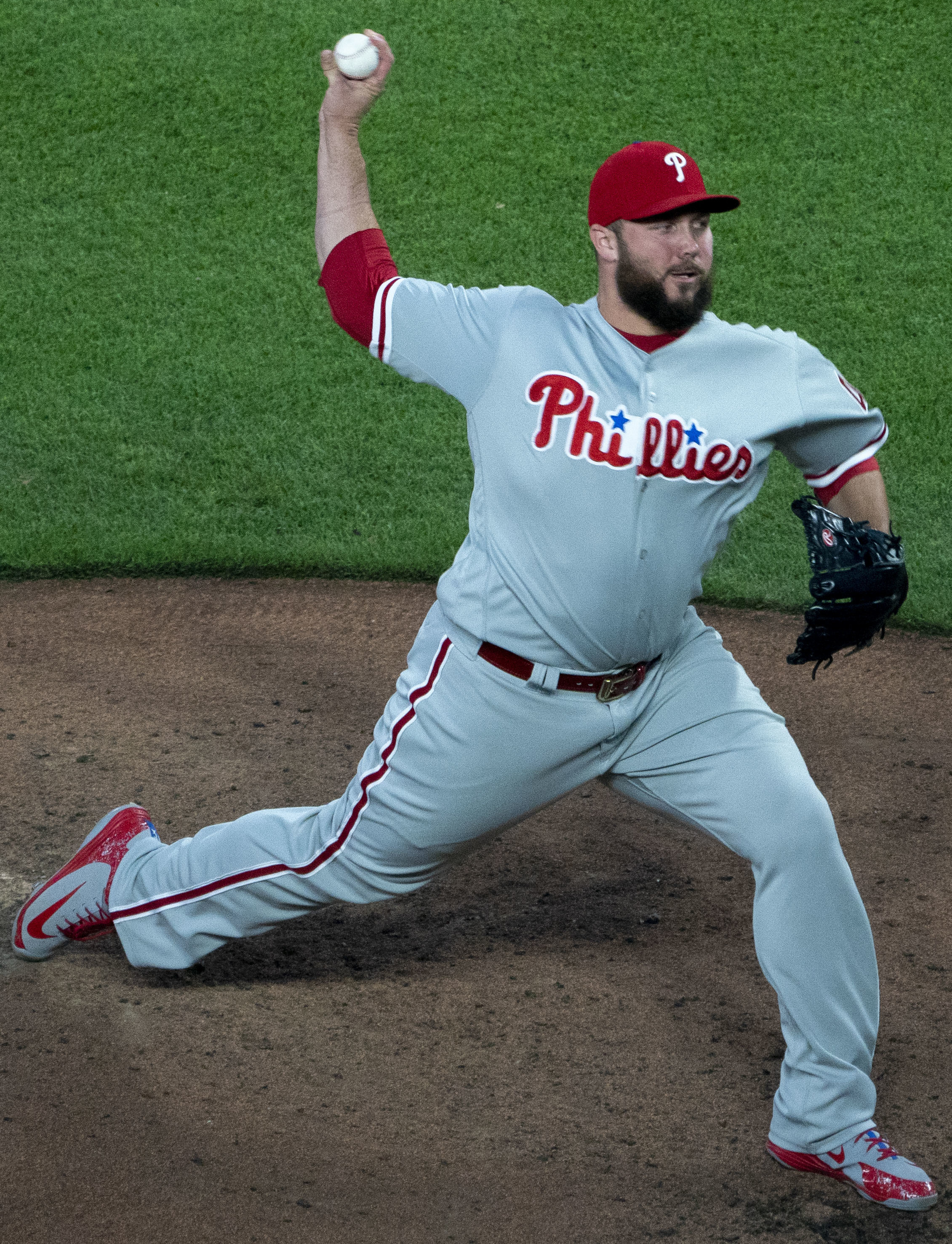
Hunter with the Phillies in 2018

On December 15, 2017, Hunter signed a two-year contract with the Philadelphia Phillies. He changed his number from 40 to 96 after Wilson Ramos was acquired from the Rays. In 2018 with the Phillies, he was 5–4 with four saves, 25 holds (tied for fifth in the NL), and a 3.80 ERA, as he struck out 51 batters in 64 innings over 65 games.

Hunter began the 2019 season on the disabled list with a right forearm injury. He was placed on the disabled list on July 14 with a right forearm injury that cost him the first three months of the season. On July 23, Hunter underwent season-ending surgery to repair the flexor tendon in his right arm. In 2019, he was 0–0 with a 0.00 ERA in 5.1 innings over five games. On February 12, 2020, Hunter re-signed with the Phillies on a one-year deal.

=== New York Mets ===
On February 14, 2021, Hunter signed a minor league contract with the New York Mets with an invitation to spring training. On March 25, Hunter exercised the opt-out clause in his contract and was released by the Mets. On March 30, Hunter re-signed with the Mets on a new minor league contract. On May 6, Hunter was selected to the active roster. On May 18, 2021, Hunter recorded his first Major League hit, a single off of Tucker Davidson of the Atlanta Braves at Truist Park. After the game he described it as fulfilling and said it made him feel like "a real baseball player." On June 10, Hunter was placed on the 60-day injured list with lower back pain. In 4 games with the Mets, Hunter pitched eight scoreless innings with six strikeouts.

=== Tampa Bay Rays (second stint) ===
On July 23, 2021, Hunter was traded to the Tampa Bay Rays alongside minor league catcher Matthew Dyer in exchange for Rich Hill.

=== New York Mets (second stint) ===
On May 2, 2022, Hunter signed a minor league deal with the New York Mets and was assigned to the Triple-A Syracuse Mets. On June 17, Hunter was selected to the 40-man roster and active rosters. Hunter made 18 appearances for the Mets in 2022, pitching to an 0–1 record and 2.48 ERA with 22 strikeouts in 22 1/3 innings pitched.

On December 6, 2022, Hunter re-signed with the Mets on a minor league contract. On March 27, 2023, Hunter was selected to the 40-man roster. In 14 appearances for the Mets, Hunter struggled to a 6.85 ERA with 20 strikeouts in 23 2/3 innings pitched. He was designated for assignment by the team on June 10. He was released by New York on June 13.

On October 11, 2023, Hunter announced his retirement from professional baseball on former teammate Adam Jones' podcast.
