= Jake Faria =

American baseball player (born 1993)

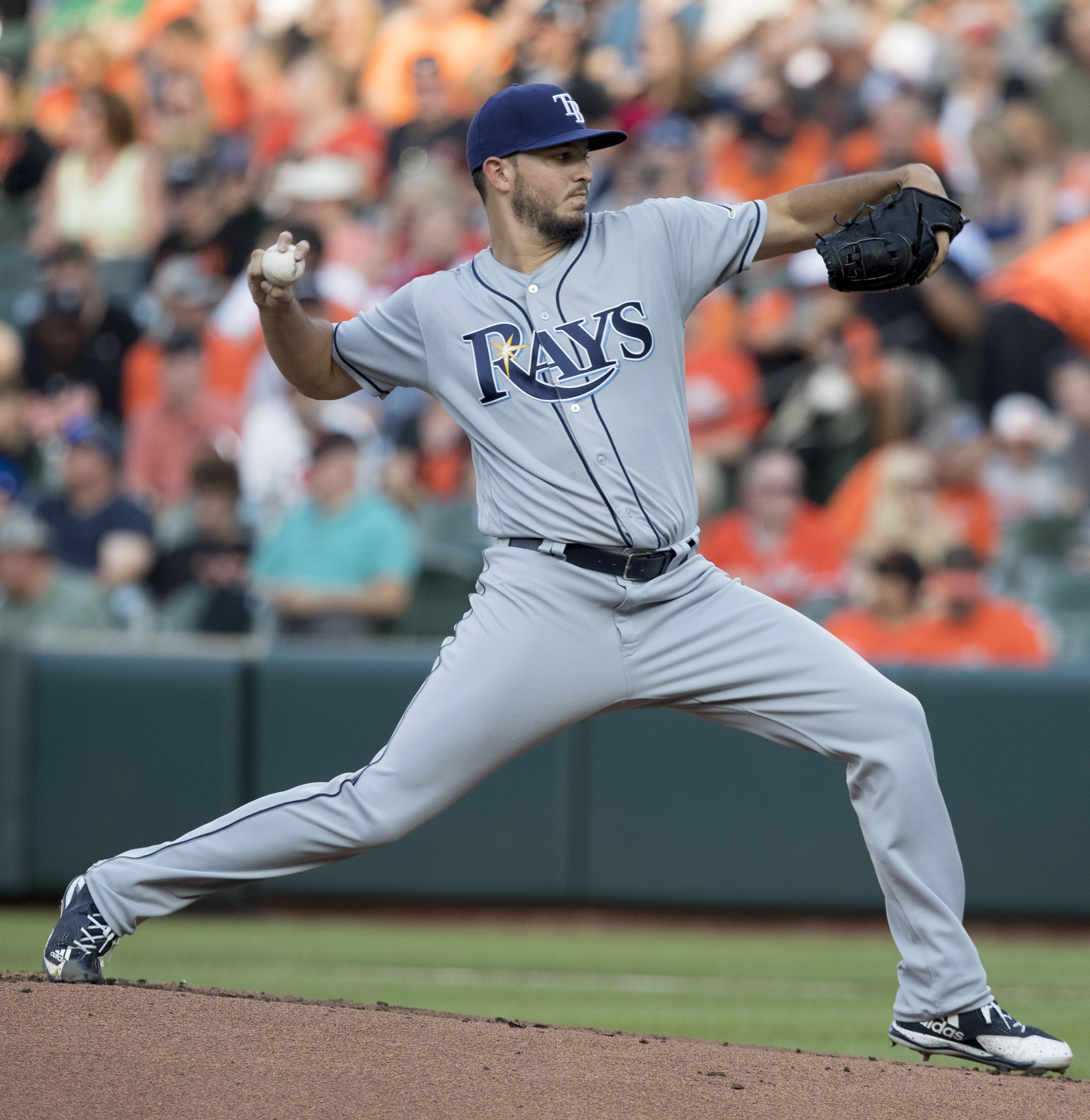
- Faria with the Tampa Bay Rays in 2017

Free agent
- Pitcher
- Born: July 30, 1993 (age 33); La Palma, California, U.S.
- Bats: Right Throws: Right

MLB debut
- June 7, 2017, for the Tampa Bay Rays

MLB statistics (through 2023 season)
- Win–loss record: 9–9
- Earned run average: 4.87
- Strikeouts: 188
- Stats at Baseball Reference

Teams
- Tampa Bay Rays (2017–2019); Milwaukee Brewers (2019); Arizona Diamondbacks (2021); Boston Red Sox (2023)

Jacob Daniel Faria (born July 30, 1993) is an American professional baseball pitcher who is a free agent. He has previously played in Major League Baseball (MLB) for the Tampa Bay Rays, Milwaukee Brewers, Arizona Diamondbacks, and Boston Red Sox.

== Amateur career ==
Faria attended Gahr High School in Cerritos, California. He committed to play college baseball at Cal State Fullerton.

== Professional career ==
=== Tampa Bay Rays ===
==== Minor leagues ====
The Tampa Bay Rays selected Faria in the 10th round, with the 330th overall selection, of the 2011 Major League Baseball draft. He made his professional debut with the rookie-level Gulf Coast League Rays. Faria played 2012 and 2013 with the Princeton Rays. He pitched 2014 with the Bowling Green Hot Rods and started 2015 with the Charlotte Stone Crabs. After going 10–1 with a 1.33 earned run average (ERA) in 12 games, he was promoted to the Double-A Montgomery Biscuits. In his second start with Montgomery, Faria tied a team record with 14 strikeouts over seven no-hit innings. Faria started 2016 with Montgomery and was promoted to the Durham Bulls in June. Entering the 2017 season, Faria was considered by Baseball America to be the eighth best prospect in the Rays' farm system. He started the season with the Bulls, and was promoted to the Rays on June 6.

==== Major leagues ====
On June 7, 2017, exactly six years after being drafted, Faria made his MLB debut against the Chicago White Sox. Faria allowed one run on three hits in 6 1/3 innings, getting the win and snapping a four-game losing streak. He became the ninth pitcher in history to start his career with seven or more quality starts. Faria ended the 2017 season with a 3.43 ERA in 16 games.

Faria started the 2018 season as the number three starter for Tampa Bay. On May 23, 2018, Faria was put on the 60-Day DL with an oblique strain, he had recorded an ERA of 5.48 in 47 2/3 innings before the injury. Faria returned on August 1, where he threw 3 2/3 innings and earned the win in relief against the Los Angeles Angels. On August 16, Faria was opted down to Triple-A Durham to make room for Tommy Pham, he was 4–3 with a 4.84 ERA. He was recalled on September 5. He began the 2018 season in the Rays rotation before landing on the disabled list on May 23 with an oblique injury. He finished the season making 17 appearances, 12 starts. He was 4–4 with a 5.40 ERA in 65 innings pitched.

=== Milwaukee Brewers ===
On July 31, 2019, the Rays traded Faria to the Milwaukee Brewers in exchange for Jesús Aguilar. He made nine appearances for Milwaukee down the stretch, but struggled to an 0–1 record and 11.42 ERA with eight strikeouts across 8 2/3 innings pitched.

Faria was designated for assignment following the signing of Jedd Gyorko on January 10, 2020. He cleared waivers and was sent outright to the Triple-A San Antonio Missions on January 21. Faria did not play in a game in 2020 due to the cancellation of the minor league season because of the COVID-19 pandemic. Faria was released by the Brewers organization on September 18.

=== Los Angeles Angels ===
On December 6, 2020, Faria signed a minor league contract with the Los Angeles Angels organization. He was assigned to the Triple-A Salt Lake Bees to begin the 2021 season. In 7 appearances for Salt Lake, he recorded a 3–2 record and 5.65 ERA before being opting out of his minor league contract on June 15, 2021.

=== Arizona Diamondbacks ===
On June 19, 2021, Faria signed a major league contract with the Arizona Diamondbacks. Faria made 23 appearances for Arizona in 2021, recording a 5.51 ERA with 32 strikeouts. On September 19, the Diamondbacks designated Faria for assignment. On September 22, Faria elected free agency.

=== Minnesota Twins ===
On December 1, 2021, Faria signed a minor league contract with the Minnesota Twins. He was assigned to the Triple-A St. Paul Saints to begin the 2022 season. He struggled in 12 games (nine starts) for the team, pitching to a 1–2 record and 7.48 ERA with 39 strikeouts in 43 1/3 innings pitched. Faria was released by the organization on June 22, 2022.

=== Boston Red Sox ===
On February 4, 2023, Faria signed a minor-league contract with the Boston Red Sox organization. On April 16, Faria was selected to Boston's active roster following an injury to Chris Martin. He went unused out of the bullpen in the team's game against the Los Angeles Angels and was designated for assignment the following day. Faria cleared waivers and was sent outright to the Triple-A Worcester Red Sox on April 19. He had his contract selected again on July 16. Faria made his Red Sox debut the same day, closing an 11–5 win over the Chicago Cubs; in two innings of work, he allowed four hits, four walks, and all five Cubs runs. Faria was designated for assignment the next day; he cleared waivers and was sent outright to Worcester on July 19. On July 27, Faria was released by the Red Sox organization.

=== Guerreros de Oaxaca ===
On April 24, 2025, after a year of inactivity, Faria signed with the Guerreros de Oaxaca of the Mexican League. In 13 starts for Oaxaca, he struggled to a 3–4 record and 6.88 ERA with 54 strikeouts across 52 1/3 innings pitched. Faria was released by the Guerreros on July 11.

=== El Águila de Veracruz ===
On May 26, 2026, Faria signed with El Águila de Veracruz of the Mexican League. In one start, he failed to record an out and allowed five earned runs while walking four batters. On May 28, Faria was released by Veracruz.

== Personal life ==
Faria and his girlfriend, Jessica Soto, became engaged in May 2017. The couple were married on November 16, 2018, in California. Faria is of Portuguese and Cuban descent.
