= Jumbo Díaz =

Dominican baseball player (born 1984)

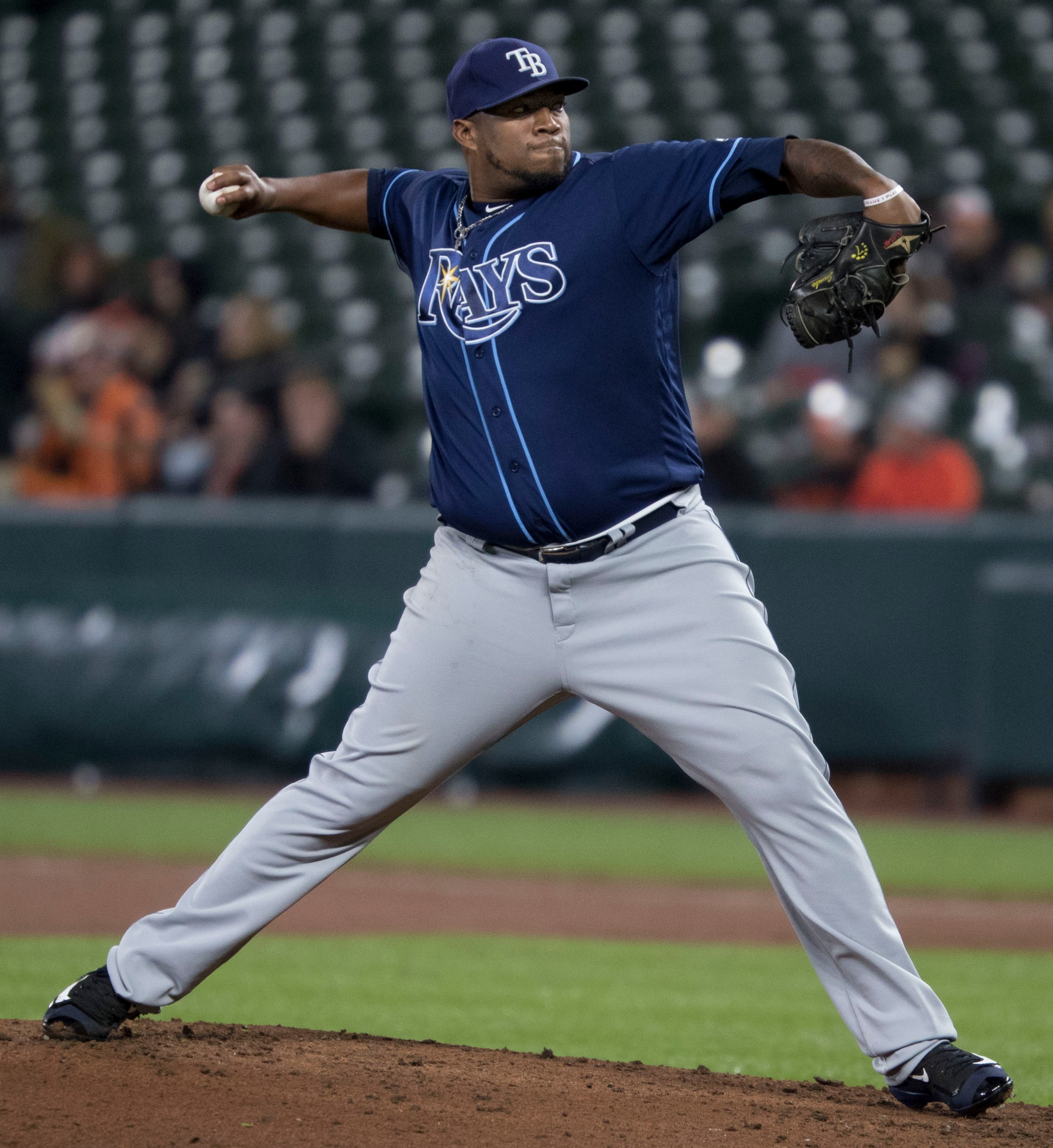
- Díaz with the Tampa Bay Rays in 2017
- Pitcher
- Born: February 27, 1984 (age 42); La Romana, Dominican Republic
- Batted: Right Threw: Right

MLB debut
- June 20, 2014, for the Cincinnati Reds

Last MLB appearance
- July 16, 2017, for the Tampa Bay Rays

MLB statistics
- Win–loss record: 4–7
- Earned run average: 4.02
- Strikeouts: 172
- Stats at Baseball Reference

Teams
- Cincinnati Reds (2014–2016); Tampa Bay Rays (2017)
Medals
Men's baseball
Representing Dominican Republic
Olympic Games
Bronze medal – third place	2020 Tokyo	Team

Jose Rafael "Jumbo" Diaz (born February 27, 1984) is a Dominican former professional baseball relief pitcher. He played in Major League Baseball (MLB) for the Cincinnati Reds and Tampa Bay Rays. He made his MLB debut in 2014. Diaz is nicknamed "Jumbo" for his large size; MLB.com lists him at 6 feet 4 inches (1.93 m) and 315 pounds (143 kg).

== Professional career ==
=== Los Angeles Dodgers ===
Díaz was signed by the Los Angeles Dodgers in 2001 and began his career the next season, appearing with the GCL Dodgers, South Georgia Waves and Great Falls Dodgers and going 5–3 with a 2.82 ERA in 16 games (12 starts). He saw limited action in 2003 with the Ogden Raptors and South Georgia, going 0–1 with a 6.62 ERA in seven games. He pitched for the Columbus Catfish and Vero Beach Dodgers in 2004 and went 1–5 with 20 saves and a 2.00 ERA in 37 games. He saw limited action in 2005, 2006 and 2007, appearing in a total of 36 games. Díaz had Tommy John surgery and missed all of the 2008 season.

=== Texas Rangers ===
Díaz signed with the Texas Rangers for 2009 and was 3–1 with 10 saves and a 3.63 ERA in 36 games for the Frisco RoughRiders. Following the season, the Rangers released him and he signed with the Baltimore Orioles, going 4–0 with 16 saves and a 1.92 ERA in 45 games. Díaz had 23 saves and a 2.62 ERA in 2011.

=== Pittsburgh Pirates ===
He then signed with the Pittsburgh Pirates for 2012 and went 1–2 with 3 saves and a 3.60 ERA in 41 games for the Indianapolis Indians. On April 29, he teamed with Justin Wilson and Doug Slaten on a no-hitter against the Durham Bulls.

=== Cincinnati Reds ===
Díaz pitched in the Cincinnati Reds system in 2013, going 3–4 with 13 saves and a 1.66 ERA for the Louisville Bats – he had a 1.03 WHIP and struck out 60 in 54.1 innings.

By the end of the 2013 campaign, Díaz weighed nearly 350 pounds (160 kg); he shed 70 pounds (32 kg) prior to the 2014 season. Díaz began 2014 with Louisville.

The Reds selected Díaz's contract from Louisville on June 20, and he entered that night's game against the Toronto Blue Jays in the seventh inning, allowing three runs in one inning. On June 24, he recorded his first MLB strikeout in Chicago against the Cubs. He finished the 2014 season with a 3.38 earned run average (ERA) in 34.2 innings pitched. Díaz earned his first MLB save on September 15, 2015.

=== Tampa Bay Rays ===
On March 10, 2017, the Tampa Bay Rays claimed Díaz off waivers. He was designated for assignment on July 16. On July 19, Díaz was assigned outright to the Triple-A Durham Bulls, but he elected free agency on July 21.

=== Houston Astros ===
On July 31, 2017, Díaz signed a minor league contract with the Houston Astros organization. In 12 games for the Triple–A Fresno Grizzlies, Díaz posted a 2.92 ERA with 11 strikeouts and 3 saves in 12 1/3 innings pitched. He elected free agency following the season on November 6.

=== Miami Marlins ===
On January 12, 2018, Díaz signed a minor league contract with the Miami Marlins. In 38 appearances split between the rookie–level Gulf Coast League Marlins and Triple–A New Orleans Baby Cakes, he accumulated a 6–6 record and 2.18 ERA with 52 strikeouts and 12 saves. Díaz elected free agency following the season on November 2.

=== Toros de Tijuana ===
On February 16, 2019, Díaz signed with the Toros de Tijuana of the Mexican League. In 58 appearances for the Toros, he logged a 2–6 record and 3.86 ERA with 66 strikeouts and 7 saves over 56 innings pitched. Díaz became a free agent following the season.

=== Diablos Rojos del México ===
On December 19, 2019, Díaz signed with the Diablos Rojos del México of the Mexican League. He did not play in a game in 2020 due to the cancellation of the Mexican League season because of the COVID-19 pandemic. In 2021, Díaz made 21 appearances out of the bullpen, posting a 2–0 record with a 1.89 ERA and 16 strikeouts. In 24 relief appearances in 2022, he struggled to a 1–2 record with a 8.20 ERA and 22 strikeouts.

=== Guerreros de Oaxaca ===
On June 21, 2022, Díaz was traded to the Guerreros de Oaxaca of the Mexican League. In 8 relief appearances, he posted a 0–2 record with a 12.86 ERA and 4 strikeouts. Díaz was released by Oaxaca on July 7.

== International career ==
After the 2020 season, Díaz played for Águilas Cibaeñas of the Dominican Professional Baseball League (LIDOM). He has also played for Dominican Republic in the 2021 Caribbean Series and the 2020 Summer Olympics.

== Coaching career ==
On January 22, 2025, the Tampa Bay Rays hired Díaz to serve as an assistant pitching coach for their rookie-level affiliate, the Dominican Summer League Rays.
