= Alex Colomé =

Dominican baseball player (born 1988)

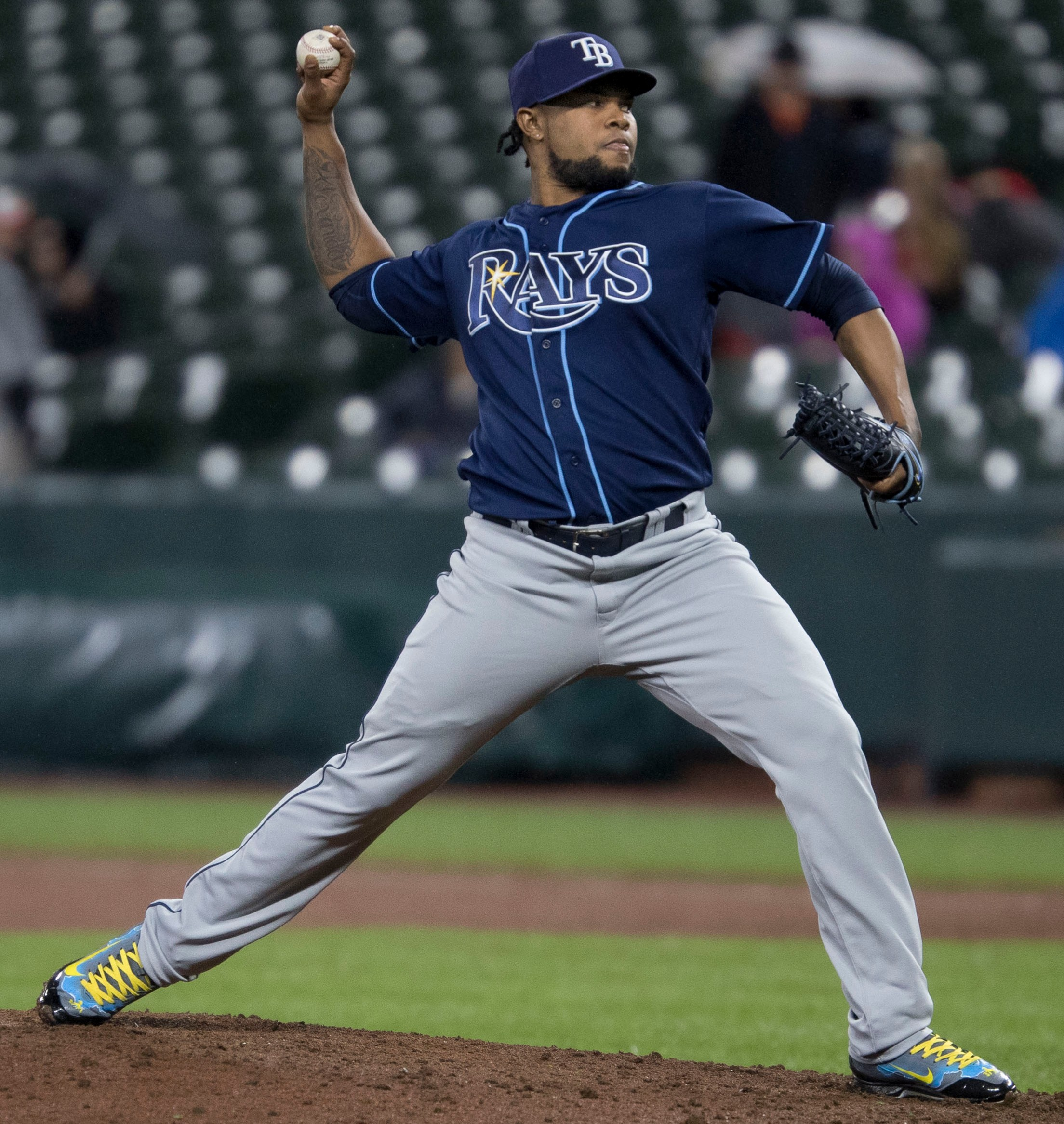
- Colomé with the Tampa Bay Rays in 2017

Leones del Escogido – No. 78
- Pitcher
- Born: December 31, 1988 (age 37); Santo Domingo, Dominican Republic
- Batted: Right Threw: Right

MLB debut
- May 30, 2013, for the Tampa Bay Rays

Last MLB appearance
- May 7, 2023, for the Chicago White Sox

MLB statistics
- Win–loss record: 34–35
- Earned run average: 3.36
- Strikeouts: 477
- Saves: 159
- Stats at Baseball Reference

Teams
- Tampa Bay Rays (2013–2018); Seattle Mariners (2018); Chicago White Sox (2019–2020); Minnesota Twins (2021); Colorado Rockies (2022); Chicago White Sox (2023)

Career highlights and awards
- All-Star (2016); AL saves leader (2017)

Alexander Manuel Colomé Pérez (born December 31, 1988) is a Dominican former professional baseball pitcher. He played in Major League Baseball (MLB) for the Tampa Bay Rays, Seattle Mariners, Minnesota Twins, Colorado Rockies, and Chicago White Sox.

== Professional career ==
=== Tampa Bay Rays ===
At age eighteen, Colomé signed with the Tampa Bay Devil Rays as an amateur free agent in March 2007. The Rays added him to their 40-man roster on November 18, 2011.

The Rays promoted Colomé to the major leagues on May 29, 2013. He started 3 games, posting a 2.25 earned run average (ERA).

On March 24, 2014, Colomé was suspended 50 games for failing a random drug test. Colome ended the year 2–0 with a 2.66 ERA in 5 games, 3 of which were starts. Colomé saw his first significant playing time in 2015, most of it due to a switch to the bullpen, where he finished with 43 appearances and a 3.94 ERA.

In 2016, Colomé was named the full-time closer for the Rays due to an injury to Brad Boxberger. He kept the role as closer. He finished the season with 37 saves, fourth in the AL, and ended the season with a 1.91 ERA. Colome was also selected to his first career All-Star game.

In 2017, Colomé became the sixth player in franchise history to reach 40 saves in a season; he ended the season with 47 saves, which led the major leagues.

=== Seattle Mariners ===
On May 25, 2018, the Rays traded Colomé and outfielder Denard Span to the Seattle Mariners in exchange for minor leaguers Andrew Moore and Tommy Romero.

=== Chicago White Sox (first stint) ===
On November 30, 2018, the Mariners traded Colomé to the Chicago White Sox in exchange for Omar Narváez. He made 62 relief outings for Chicago in 2019, registering a 4-5 record and 2.80 ERA with 55 strikeouts and 30 saves across 61 innings pitched.

With the 2020 Chicago White Sox, Colomé appeared in 21 games, compiling a 2–0 record with 0.81 ERA and 16 strikeouts in 22 1/3 innings pitched.

=== Minnesota Twins ===
On February 12, 2021, Colomé officially signed a one-year, $5 million contract with the Minnesota Twins. In 67 relief appearances for Minnesota, he compiled a 4-4 record and 4.15 ERA with 58 strikeouts and 17 saves across 65 innings pitched.

=== Colorado Rockies ===
On March 17, 2022, Colomé officially signed a one-year, $4.1 million contract with the Colorado Rockies. Colomé appeared in 53 games for the Rockies, but struggled to a 2–7 record and 5.74 ERA with four saves and 32 strikeouts in 47.0 innings pitched.

=== Chicago White Sox (second stint) ===
On January 27, 2023, Colomé signed a minor league contract with the Washington Nationals organization. He was released by the Nationals on March 29.

On April 7, 2023, Colomé signed a minor league contract with the Chicago White Sox organization. He made 8 appearances for the Triple-A Charlotte Knights, registering a 2.25 ERA with 7 strikeouts and 1 save in 8.0 innings pitched. On May 2, Colomé had his contract selected to the active roster. He made 4 appearances for the White Sox, surrendering 2 runs in 3.0 innings of work. On May 10, Colomé was designated for assignment following the promotion of Jake Marisnick. He cleared waivers and was sent outright to Charlotte on May 12. Colomé was released by the White Sox organization on August 3.

=== Saraperos de Saltillo ===
On February 23, 2024, Colomé signed with the Saraperos de Saltillo of the Mexican League. In 19 games for Saltillo, he posted a 5.29 ERA with 14 strikeouts and 8 saves across 17 innings pitched. On June 4, Colomé was released by the Saraperos.

=== Sultanes de Monterrey ===
On June 5, 2024, Colomé was claimed off waivers by the Sultanes de Monterrey of the Mexican League. In 21 games for Monterrey, he logged a 1–2 record and 4.67 ERA with 15 strikeouts across 17 1/3 innings pitched. Colomé was released by the Sultanes on September 21.

== Personal life ==
Colomé is the nephew of former Rays reliever Jesús Colomé.
