= 2017 Boston Red Sox season =

Major League Baseball season

2017 Boston Red Sox
- American League East champions
- League: American League
- Division: East
- Ballpark: Fenway Park
- City: Boston, Massachusetts
- Record: 93–69 (.574)
- Divisional place: 1st
- Owners: John W. Henry (Fenway Sports Group)
- President: Sam Kennedy
- President of baseball operations: Dave Dombrowski
- General manager: none (de facto by President of Baseball Operations)
- Manager: John Farrell
- Television: NESN (Dave O'Brien, Jerry Remy, Dennis Eckersley, Steve Lyons, Tom Caron)
- Radio: WEEI-FM; Boston Red Sox Radio Network (Joe Castiglione, Tim Neverett, Lou Merloni)
- Stats: ESPN.com; Baseball Reference

The 2017 Boston Red Sox season was the 117th season in the team's history, and their 106th season at Fenway Park. They finished with 93 wins and 69 losses, the same record as their previous season, two games ahead of the second-place New York Yankees. It was also the team's first season in 15 years without David Ortiz, due to his retirement. The Red Sox won their second straight American League East championship, the first time the team won the division (which was established in 1969) in consecutive years; it was their ninth division title overall. In the postseason, they lost the American League Division Series in four games to the eventual 2017 World Series champions, the Houston Astros.

== Offseason ==
=== October 2016 ===
- On October 16, general manager Mike Hazen left the Red Sox for the Arizona Diamondbacks.

=== November 2016 ===
- On November 3, Brian Bannister was promoted to vice president of pitching development, in addition to his role as assistant pitching coach.
- On November 4, bench coach Torey Lovullo left the Red Sox for the Arizona Diamondbacks to take over as manager.
- On November 11, the Red Sox appointed Gary DiSarcina, former Lowell Spinners and Pawtucket Red Sox manager, as their new bench coach.
- On November 15, DH David Ortiz officially retired.

=== December 2016 ===
- On December 6, the Red Sox traded 3B Travis Shaw with prospects RHP Josh Pennington, SS Mauricio Dubon and a player to be named later to the Milwaukee Brewers for reliever RHP Tyler Thornburg. The Brewers later received $100 instead of the PTBNL.
- On December 6, the Red Sox traded prospects 3B Yoan Moncada, RHP Michael Kopech, CF Luis Alexander Basabe and RHP Víctor Díaz to the Chicago White Sox for starter LHP Chris Sale.
- On December 8, the Red Sox acquired Josh Rutledge in the Rule 5 draft from the Colorado Rockies. Rutledge played parts of the 2015 and 2016 seasons with Boston.
- On December 8, the Red Sox signed free agent 1B Mitch Moreland to a one-year, $5.5M deal.
- On December 20, the Red Sox traded RHP Clay Buchholz to the Philadelphia Phillies for 2B Josh Tobias.

== Regular season ==
=== Opening Day, April 3 vs. Pittsburgh ===
Reigning AL Cy Young winner Rick Porcello made his first opening day start of his career, going 6 1/3 innings, allowing three runs on six hits in the win. The Red Sox bats could only get one hit off of Pirates starter Gerrit Cole through 4 2/3 innings but then strung together six 2-out hits. Jackie Bradley Jr. started the rally with a triple of the right field wall, Pablo Sandoval legged out an infield single, Sandy León laid down a bunt down the third base line, Dustin Pedroia with a single down the middle, which plated Pablo Sandoval, Andrew Benintendi with a three-run shot in the Pirates bullpen and Mookie Betts reached second on another infield single and a throwing error by the shortstop Jordy Mercer. Hanley Ramírez made the third out and Cole's day was over. Pittsburgh got to Porcello in the seventh, where he gave up three hits and three runs, two of them inherited by Matt Barnes. Barnes eventually got out of the inning. Neither team would score in the remainder of the game and Craig Kimbrel closed out the game on one hit and one hit batsman.

==== Opening Day lineup ====
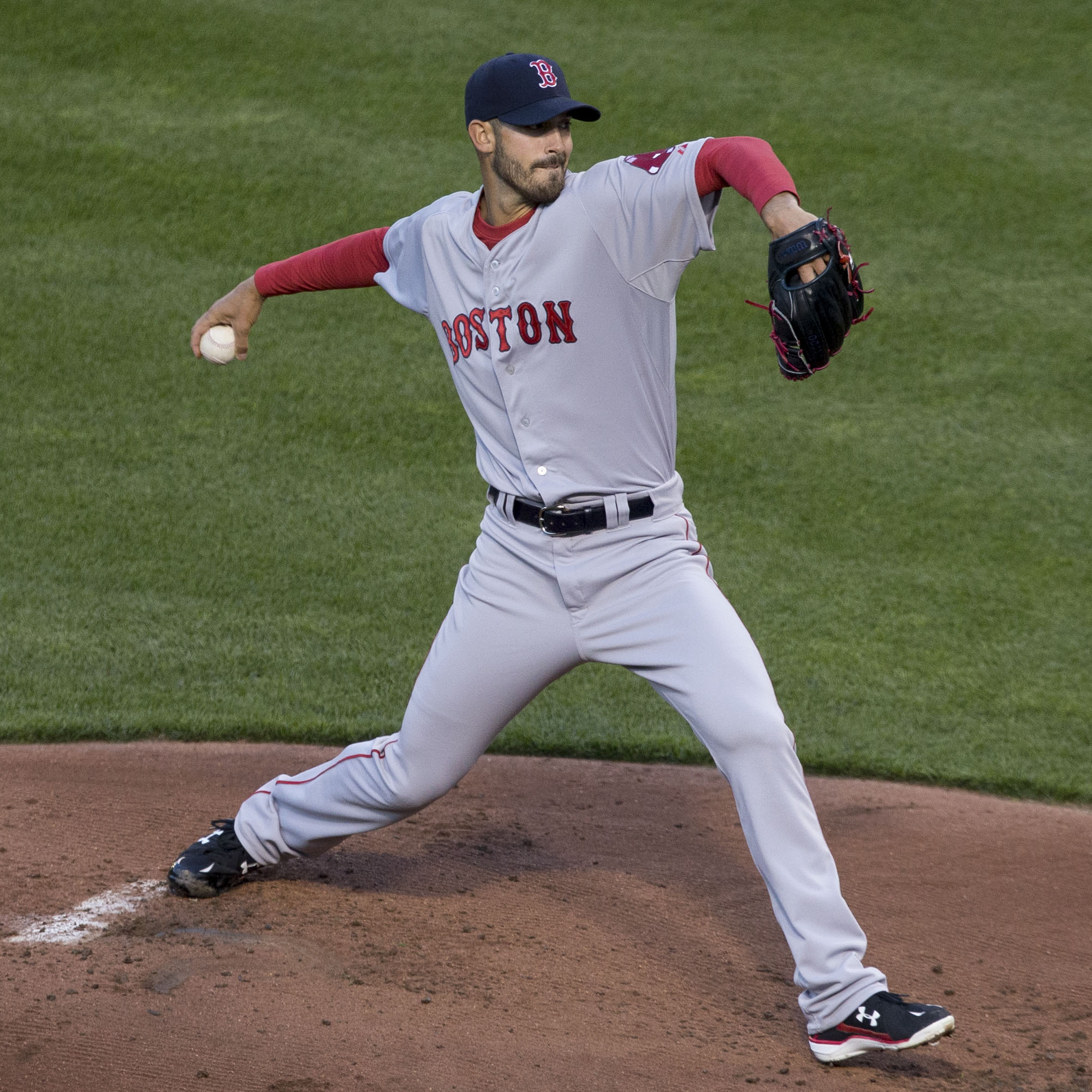
Opening Day starter Rick Porcello

15	Dustin Pedroia	2B
16	Andrew Benintendi	LF
50	Mookie Betts	RF
13	Hanley Ramírez	DH
18	Mitch Moreland	1B
2	Xander Bogaerts	SS
19	Jackie Bradley Jr.	CF
48	Pablo Sandoval	3B
3	Sandy León	C
22	Rick Porcello	P

April

=== April ===
April 3–6, vs. Pittsburgh
In his Red Sox debut, Chris Sale struck out seven Pirates batters in his 7 shut-out innings. He received no run support until a three-run walk-off shot by Sandy León in the 12th inning. Game three of the series was postponed and rescheduled for April 13.
Red Sox won the series 2–0 (8–3 runs)
April 7–10, in Detroit
In the series opener, Steven Wright gave up four runs in 6 2/3 innings. Down by four runs going into the eighth, the Red Sox put a five spot on the board, including a three-run shot by Pablo Sandoval, only to have the bullpen give up two more runs to win it for the Tigers. In game two, Boston took an early 1–0 lead, but that's all they would get. Detroit scored four times against Eduardo Rodríguez and dropped two games in a row. With several players already down with the flu, Andrew Benintendi threw up during the sixth inning in the outfield but could finish the game. Rick Porcello gave up eleven hits but the Tigers could only push four players across the plate. In late game heroics, Boston scored four times to take the lead in the eighth. Craig Kimbrel gave up one run but eventually closed the game. Chris Sale went 7 2/3 innings, striking out 10 Tigers and allowing only two runs in the final game of the series, but that was enough for Detroit. Boston only scored once on a bases loaded, nobody out situation against Justin Verlander in the second inning.
Red Sox lost the series 1–3 (14–17 runs)
April 11–12, vs. Baltimore
Drew Pomeranz went 6 innings of one-run ball in his season debut. Boston up by one run, scored three runs each in the seventh and eighth inning to put the game out of reach. In the second game of the odd two-game series against a division rival, Steven Wright was pulled after 1 1/3 innings, giving up 8 runs on as many hits. The bullpen allowed four more runs over the course of the game. A rally in the middle innings, where Boston scored 5 runs in three consecutive innings, fell way short.
Red Sox tied the series 1—1 (13–13 runs)
April 13, vs. Pittsburgh
In the makeup game from the opening series of the season, Eduardo Rodríguez allowed two first innings runs before settling in. Down by two runs coming into the eighth, the Pirates allowed three men to reach with one out, two via base on balls. Mookie Betts scored the go-ahead run from first on a Hanley Ramírez double, but the close play at the plate was successfully challenged. Xander Bogaerts eventually drove in Hanley and Craig Kimbrel shut the door.
Red Sox won the series 1–0 (4–3 runs)
April 14–17, vs. Tampa Bay
Rick Porcello was shelled for 8 runs in 4 1/3 innings, the most since April 19, 2015 vs. Baltimore. Down by 8 runs coming into the ninth, the Red Sox rallied for three, but that was all they could get. The doubles streak of Mitch Moreland ended after seven consecutive games. Chris Sale pitched another gem in his third start and won his first game of the season. He allowed just three hits and one run in seven innings, striking out 12 Rays batters. Moreland scored twice, on a solo shot in the second and a Sandy León groundout, providing the only runs for Boston. Drew Pomeranz didn't make it through the fifth with five allowed runs, but the Red Sox out-hit the Rays 17–7. Pablo Sandoval ripped his team-leading fourth home run of the season onto the green monster. On Patriots' Day, the Red Sox played their traditional 11 am game and quickly scored four runs in the first two innings, after Tampa Bay took a two-run lead in the first. Steven Wright gave up three runs, one of them earned, in six innings of work. The bullpen kept the Rays off the scoreboard and Craig Kimbrel struck out the side for his sixth save of the season.
Red Sox won the series 3–1 (18–19 runs)
April 18–20, in Toronto
Brian Johnson outpitched Marcus Stroman in a game where both teams connected for 27 hits. The Jays rallied for three runs in the ninth, but came one run short. Rick Porcello allowed three unearned runs but received no run-support and the Red Sox where shut out for the first time this season. In the rubber match, Chris Sale pitched another great game with 8 shut out innings, striking out 13. The save streak of Craig Kimbrel ended on 25 on a lead-off home run by Kendrys Morales, he eventually got the win, striking out five of the seven batters he faced. Mookie Betts drove in three in the tenth on a two-out double.
Red Sox won the series 2–1 (12–11 runs)
April 21–23, in Baltimore
The Red Sox where shutout for the second time in three games. Dustin Pedroia had to leave the game in the eighth, after a controversial slide with his raised cleats into second base by Manny Machado. The Red Sox could not hold on to their 2–0 lead in the second game. Baltimore scored four times in the fourth and Steven Wright was pulled early. Eduardo Rodríguez pitched six shut out innings, allowing only one hit. He was aided by six runs and the first 5-for-5 performance by Andrew Benintendi of his career. Matt Barnes was ejected in the eighth on would be retaliation pitch against Machado, which hit his bat just inches away from his head. Barnes was eventually suspended for four games.
Red Sox lost the series 1–2 (8–8 runs)
April 26–27, vs. New York
The first game of the would-be three-game series was rained out and rescheduled for mid-July. In both games Rick Porcello and Chris Sale were given virtually no run support. Both allowed three runs, two earned. Sale struck out ten, but allowed 8 hits. Down just 0–1, Sale was back on the mound for the ninth, in which he gave up three straight hits, before being pulled with no outs recorded.
Red Sox lost the series 0–2 (1–6 runs)
April 28–30, vs. Chicago (NL)
The bats came to life with the reigning World Series champion in town. Boston scored five in the first off Jake Arrieta. The Cubs rallied in the seventh but came up short. An early 3–0 lead was lost in the seventh on account of two errors in the same play by the Boston defense. Steven Wright started his last game of the season, he opted for season-ending surgery five days later. The Red Sox got to their former closer Koji Uehara in the eighth inning, with the game being tied at two, for four runs. Hanley Ramírez hit home runs in back-to-back games. Eduardo Rodríguez pitched another good game with one run allowed over six frames. Matt Barnes became the team's leader in pitcher wins with 3.
Red Sox won the series 2–1 (15–13 runs)

Composite line score April

Team	1	2	3	4	5	6	7	8	9	10	12	R	H	E
Opponent	18	10	10	9	9	5	19	4	9	0	0	93	191	13
Boston	14	10	9	5	13	1	9	21	5	3	3	93	219	19

_{*Extra innings without runs are not displayed}

May

=== May ===
May 1–4, vs. Baltimore
Mookie Betts got plunked by a 95-mph Dylan Bundy fastball in the first game of the series, but no warnings were issued and there weren't any further actions by either team. Rick Porcello gave up two runs in six innings. Baltimore scored three times in the 8th inning, aided by three Red Sox errors. Chris Sale threw behind Manny Machado in the first inning and both benches were warned. Orioles reliever Donnie Hart threw a pitch at Andrew Benintendi's head but was not ejected nor disciplined for his action. Sale picked up the win, allowing only three hits in 8 innings. He struck out 11. Kevin Gausman was ejected in the second inning of game three, in which he hit Xander Bogaerts with a 77-mph curveball. Later in the game, Adam Jones was ejected for arguing balls and strikes with homeplate umpire Sam Holbrook. Drew Pomeranz became the first Red Sox starter with three wins in his 5 1/3 innings of work. The bullpen pitched a shutout and Craig Kimbrel picked up his tenth save of the season, striking out the side on 12 pitches. In the final game of the series, emotions cooled down and there were no further retaliations. Kyle Kendrick, in his first start for Boston, surrendered six runs in the loss. Baltimore connected for 17 hits.
Red Sox tied the series 2–2 (14–17 runs)

May 5–7, at Minneapolis
Matt Barnes gave up a walk-off home run to former AL MVP Joe Mauer, after the Red Sox rallied for two runs in the ninth to tie the game. Eduardo Rodríguez pitched six innings, giving up three runs on seven hits. The bats came alive in the second game of the series, scoring eight runs in the second inning. The bases were empty with two outs before Chris Young started a rally with a solo home run. Nine batters reached base, eight of them via the hit and one of them on an error. Boston put three more runs on the board, including another home run by Young and by Sandy León. Rick Porcello went seven innings of one-run ball. In the rubber match, finally Chris Sale received decent run support. Boston tagged the AL ERA leader, with 0.66, Ervin Santana for three runs in the first inning, a Dustin Pedroia solo home run and an absolute blast by Andrew Benintendi with Xander Bogaerts on first, which left the ballpark. After Boston extended the lead to four, Sale struggled in the fifth and the Twins tied up the game, only to give up a two-run home run to Sandy León which barely left the park. Up by three in the eighth, Matt Barnes gave up a home run and could not make an out. Lefty Robby Scott got the out against the lefty batter but a run scored on the sacrifice fly. With the tying run on third and only one out, Craig Kimbrel came in in a high-leverage situation and struck out both batters he faced. In a 39-minute top of the ninth, seven consecutive players reached base safely with one out, before Deven Marrero grounded out. The inning was extended on a fielding error. Four more batters reached base safely, including three consecutive walks. Chris Young, the 15th batter of the inning, became the third out. Except for Marrero, every hitter in the line-up reached base safely; ten runs came across the plate to score. Santana allowed six runs in the game, all of them earned. He allowed only three runs in his previous six starts combined. Sale extended his 10+ strikeout streak to six.
Red Sox won the series 2–1 (32–12 runs)

May 9–11, at Milwaukee
The Brewers tagged Drew Pomeranz for six runs in four innings in the loss. Boston narrowed the gap to two runs in the fifth but Heath Hembree allowed three more runs in the sixth. Kyle Kendrick also allowed six runs in his start, a hole too deep for the offense to climb out of. Both teams collected 49 hits in the first two games combined. Coming into the game with a career ERA of 5.26 in day games, as opposed to his 3.36 ERA in night games, Eduardo Rodríguez pitched a three-hit, one-run game over six frames. He was pinch hit for in the seventh. Boston left the go-ahead run stranded at third with nobody out in the top of eighth. Craig Kimbrel was again summoned from the bullpen in a non-save situation, with the go-ahead run at first and one out in the bottom of the eighth. He struck out Eric Thames, allowed an infield hit and the runner from second advanced to third on a wild pitch. Kimbrel ended the threat with another strikeout. In the top of the ninth, Christian Vázquez walked and Deven Marrero reached on an error. Mookie Betts put three runs on the board with his fifth home run of the season. Kimbrel struck out the side on a total of nine pitches to secure the win—it was the third immaculate inning in Red Sox franchise history.
Red Sox lost the series 1–2 (15–19 runs)

May 12–14, vs. Tampa Bay
Red Sox lost the series 1–2 (12–19 runs)

May 16–17, at St. Louis
Red Sox won the series 2–0 (11–7 runs)

May 18–20, at Oakland
Red Sox lost the series 1–3 (20–22 runs)

May 23–25, vs. Texas
Red Sox won the series 3–0 (26–12 runs)

May 26–28, vs. Seattle
Red Sox won the series 2–1 (9–5 runs)

May 29–31, at Chicago
Red Sox won the series 2–1 (21–13 runs)

June

=== June ===
July

=== July ===
August

=== August ===
August 3–August 6, vs. Chicago White Sox

August 8–August 9, at Tampa Bay Rays

On August 9, the Red Sox defeated the Rays, 8–2, to extend their winning streak to eight games. In the fifth inning, Rick Porcello struck out the side on nine pitches; it was the fourth immaculate inning in franchise history and second of the season, following one by Craig Kimbrel on May 11.

August 11–August 13, at New York Yankees

August 14, vs. Cleveland Indians

August 15–August 16, vs. St. Louis Cardinals

August 18–August 20, vs. New York Yankees

August 21–August 24, at Cleveland Indians

August 25–August 27, vs. Baltimore Orioles
This three-game series was played on the inaugural Players Weekend, when MLB players are allowed and encouraged to put nicknames on the back of their uniforms. For the opening game, the nicknames used by Boston's starting lineup were as follows:

Order	No.	Player	Nickname	Pos.
1	36	Eduardo Núñez	NUNIE	2B
2	16	Andrew Benintendi	BENNY	LF
3	50	Mookie Betts	MOOKIE	RF
4	18	Mitch Moreland	2-BAGS	1B
5	2	Xander Bogaerts	X	SS
6	11	Rafael Devers	CARLÍTA	3B
7	30	Chris Young	CY	DH
8	25	Rajai Davis	RAJ	CF
9	3	Sandy León	NOAH	C
–	22	Rick Porcello	VEINTIDÓS	P

The August 25 game, a 16–3 win by Baltimore, was notable for the Red Sox making an illegal player re-entry late in the game, which went undetected at the time. With the Orioles leading by 13 runs, position player Mitch Moreland pitched the ninth inning for Boston, with Hanley Ramírez entering the game to play first base, resulting in loss of the designated hitter. Ramírez should have taken Chris Young's position in the batting order (seventh). However, with one out in the bottom of the ninth inning, Young batted in his (former) seventh position in the order, which is an illegal player re-entry. Young hit a single, and the game ended three batters later, with Young's hit having no bearing on the outcome of the game. The illegal player re-entry appears to be unique in MLB history.

September / October

=== Sign stealing revelations ===
In September 2017, the Red Sox were fined for their role in stealing signs from the rival New York Yankees. On February 4, 2020, MLB Network journalist Peter Gammons reported that former Red Sox player Chris Young, who left the Red Sox following the 2017 season, told him that Young was the mastermind of the Red Sox' Apple Watch scheme, telling him "I started the whole Apple Watch thing. I got it from when I was with the Yankees." Young later denied to SportsNet New York (SNY) that he told this to Gammons, and Gammons retracted his comments via Twitter, stating that Young's "word is gold." In reporting Young's denial, SNY also revealed that Young had in fact been interviewed by MLB officials as part of the 2017 investigation against the Red Sox and that multiple sources told the sports news agency that Young was in fact a leader of the team's 2017 Apple Watch scheme.

== Postseason ==
=== 2017 American League Division Series vs. Houston Astros ===
==== Game 1, October 5 ====
October 5, 2017 4:08 pm EDT at Minute Maid Park in Houston, Texas
Team	1	2	3	4	5	6	7	8	9	R	H	E
Boston	0	1	0	1	0	0	0	0	0	2	8	0
Houston	2	0	0	2	1	2	1	0	x	8	12	0
WP: Justin Verlander (1–0) LP: Chris Sale (0–1); Home runs: BOS: None; HOU: Alex Bregman (1), Jose Altuve (3); Attendance: 43,102

==== Game 2, October 6 ====
October 6, 2017 2:05 pm EDT at Minute Maid Park in Houston, Texas
Team	1	2	3	4	5	6	7	8	9	R	H	E
Boston	0	1	0	0	0	0	0	0	1	2	7	1
Houston	2	0	2	0	0	4	0	0	X	8	12	0
WP: Dallas Keuchel (1–0) LP: Drew Pomeranz (0–1); Home runs: BOS: None; HOU: Carlos Correa (1), George Springer (1); Attendance: 43,410

==== Game 3, October 8 ====
October 8, 2017 2:30 pm EDT at Fenway Park in Boston, Massachusetts
Team	1	2	3	4	5	6	7	8	9	R	H	E
Houston	3	0	0	0	0	0	0	0	0	3	13	2
Boston	0	1	3	0	0	0	6	0	X	10	15	0
WP: Joe Kelly (1–0) LP: Francisco Liriano (0-1); Home runs: HOU: Carlos Correa (2); BOS: Rafael Devers (1), Jackie Bradley Jr. (1); Attendance: 38,010

==== Game 4, October 9 ====
October 9, 2017 1:00 pm EDT at Fenway Park in Boston, Massachusetts
Team	1	2	3	4	5	6	7	8	9	R	H	E
Houston	1	1	0	0	0	0	0	2	1	5	12	0
Boston	1	0	0	0	2	0	0	0	1	4	9	1
WP: Justin Verlander (2-0) LP: Chris Sale (0-2) Sv: Ken Giles (1); Home runs: HOU: Alex Bregman (2); BOS: Xander Bogaerts (1), Andrew Benintendi (1), Rafael Devers (2); Attendance: 37,305

==== Composite line score ====
2017 ALDS (1–3): Boston lost to Houston

Team	1	2	3	4	5	6	7	8	9	R	H	E
Houston	8	1	2	2	1	6	1	2	1	24	49	2
Boston	1	3	3	1	2	0	6	0	2	18	39	2
Total attendance: 161,827 Average attendance: 40,457

=== Postseason rosters ===
Playoff rosters
American League Division Series

- Pitchers: 22 Rick Porcello 24 David Price 31 Drew Pomeranz 38 Doug Fister 39 Carson Smith 41 Chris Sale 43 Addison Reed 46 Craig Kimbrel 52 Eduardo Rodríguez 56 Joe Kelly 71 Austin Maddox
- Catchers: 3 Sandy León 7 Christian Vázquez
- Infielders: 2 Xander Bogaerts 11 Rafael Devers 12 Brock Holt 13 Hanley Ramírez 15 Dustin Pedroia 17 Deven Marrero 18 Mitch Moreland 36 Eduardo Núñez (Game 1)
- Outfielders: 16 Andrew Benintendi 19 Jackie Bradley Jr. 25 Rajai Davis 30 Chris Young (Games 2–4) 50 Mookie Betts

== Season standings ==
=== American League East ===
AL East
Team	W	L	Pct.	GB	Home	Road
Boston Red Sox	93	69	.574	—	48‍–‍33	45‍–‍36
New York Yankees	91	71	.562	2	51‍–‍30	40‍–‍41
Tampa Bay Rays	80	82	.494	13	42‍–‍39	38‍–‍43
Toronto Blue Jays	76	86	.469	17	42‍–‍39	34‍–‍47
Baltimore Orioles	75	87	.463	18	46‍–‍35	29‍–‍52

=== American League Wild Card ===
Division leaders
Team	W	L	Pct.
Cleveland Indians	102	60	.630
Houston Astros	101	61	.623
Boston Red Sox	93	69	.574

Wild Card teams (Top 2 teams qualify for postseason)
Team	W	L	Pct.	GB
New York Yankees	91	71	.562	+6
Minnesota Twins	85	77	.525	—
Kansas City Royals	80	82	.494	5
Los Angeles Angels	80	82	.494	5
Tampa Bay Rays	80	82	.494	5
Seattle Mariners	78	84	.481	7
Texas Rangers	78	84	.481	7
Toronto Blue Jays	76	86	.469	9
Baltimore Orioles	75	87	.463	10
Oakland Athletics	75	87	.463	10
Chicago White Sox	67	95	.414	18
Detroit Tigers	64	98	.395	21

=== Red Sox team leaders ===
Batting
Batting average†	Xander Bogaerts	.273
Home runs	Mookie Betts	24
RBIs	Mookie Betts	102
Runs scored	Mookie Betts	101
Stolen bases	Mookie Betts	26
Pitching
Wins	Chris Sale	17
ERA‡	Chris Sale	2.90
WHIP‡	Chris Sale	0.97
Strikeouts	Chris Sale	308
Saves	Craig Kimbrel	35

† Minimum 3.1 plate appearances per team games played
AVG qualified batters: Benintendi, Betts, Bogaerts, Bradley, Moreland, Ramirez
‡ Minimum 1 inning pitched per team games played
ERA & WHIP qualified pitchers: Pomeranz, Porcello, Sale

=== Record against opponents ===
2017 American League record Source: MLB Standings Grid – 2017
Team	BAL	BOS	CWS	CLE	DET	HOU	KC	LAA	MIN	NYY	OAK	SEA	TB	TEX	TOR	NL
Baltimore	—	10–9	4–3	1–6	3–4	1–5	3–3	2–4	2–5	7–12	4–3	4–2	8–11	6–1	12–7	8–12
Boston	9–10	—	6–1	4–3	3–4	3–4	2–4	2–4	5–2	8–11	3–4	3–3	11–8	5–1	13–6	16–4
Chicago	3–4	1–6	—	6–13	10–9	4–2	10–9	3–4	7–12	3–4	1–5	3–4	3–3	4–3	3–3	6–14
Cleveland	6–1	3–4	13–6	—	13–6	5–1	12–7	6–0	12–7	5–2	3–4	4–2	4–3	6–1	4–2	6–14
Detroit	4–3	4–3	9–10	6–13	—	3–4	8–11	3–4	8–11	3–3	1–5	1–6	2–5	1–5	3–3	8–12
Houston	5–1	4–3	2–4	1–5	4–3	—	3–4	12–7	5–1	5–2	12–7	14–5	3–4	12–7	4–3	15–5
Kansas City	3–3	4–2	9–10	7–12	11–8	4–3	—	6–1	8–11	2–5	3–3	5–2	4–3	1–6	3–3	9–11
Los Angeles	4–2	4–2	4–3	0–6	4–3	7–12	1–6	—	2–5	4–2	12–7	12–7	3–4	8–11	4–3	11–9
Minnesota	5–2	2–5	12–7	7–12	11–8	1–5	11–8	5–2	—	2–4	3–3	3–4	2–4	4–3	4–3	13–7
New York	12–7	11–8	4–3	2–5	3–3	2–5	5–2	2–4	4–2	—	2–5	5–2	12–7	3–3	9–10	15–5
Oakland	3–4	4–3	5–1	4–3	5–1	7–12	3–3	7–12	3–3	5–2	—	7–12	2–5	10–9	2–5	7–13
Seattle	2–4	3–3	4–3	2–4	6–1	5–14	2–5	7–12	4–3	2–5	12–7	—	5–1	11–8	1–6	12–8
Tampa Bay	11–8	8–11	3–3	3–4	5–2	4–3	3–4	4–3	4–2	7–12	5–2	1–5	—	2–4	9–10	11–9
Texas	1–6	1–5	3–4	1–6	5–1	7–12	6–1	11–8	3–4	3–3	9–10	8–11	4–2	—	3–4	14–6
Toronto	7–12	6–13	3–3	2–4	3–3	3–4	3–3	3–4	3–4	10–9	5–2	6–1	10–9	4–3	—	9–11

Red Sox vs. National League
Team	NL Central					
Team	CHC	CIN	MIL	PIT	STL	PHI
Boston	2–1	3–0	1–2	3–0	4–0	3–1

== Roster ==
2017 Boston Red Sox
Roster
Pitchers: 58 Fernando Abad; 68 Matt Barnes; 51 Blaine Boyer; 29 Roenis Elías; 38 Doug Fister; 37 Heath Hembree; 61 Brian Johnson; 56 Joe Kelly; 25 Kyle Kendrick; 46 Craig Kimbrel; 64,71 Austin Maddox; 72 Kyle Martin; 31 Drew Pomeranz; 22 Rick Porcello; 24 David Price; 66 Noé Ramirez; 43 Addison Reed; 52 Eduardo Rodríguez; 28 Robbie Ross Jr.; 41 Chris Sale; 63 Robby Scott; 39 Carson Smith; 64 Ben Taylor; 76 Héctor Velázquez; 67 Brandon Workman; 35 Steven Wright	Catchers: 3 Sandy León; 23 Blake Swihart; 7 Christian Vázquez; Infielders: 2 Xander Bogaerts; 11 Chase d'Arnaud; 11 Rafael Devers; 40 Marco Hernández; 12 Brock Holt; 73,5 Tzu-Wei Lin; 17 Deven Marrero; 18 Mitch Moreland; 36 Eduardo Núñez; 15 Dustin Pedroia; 13 Hanley Ramírez; 32 Josh Rutledge; 48 Pablo Sandoval; 59 Sam Travis	Outfielders: 16 Andrew Benintendi; 50 Mookie Betts; 19 Jackie Bradley Jr.; 25 Rajai Davis; 62 Steve Selsky; 30 Chris Young	Manager: 53 John Farrell; Coaches: 20 Rubén Amaro Jr. (first base/outfield); 86 Brian Bannister (assistant pitching); 87 Mike Brenly (bullpen catcher); 55 Brian Butterfield (third base/infield); 44 Chili Davis (hitting); 10 Gary DiSarcina (bench); 43,60 Dana LeVangie (bullpen/catching); 88 Mani Martinez (bullpen catcher); 57 Vic Rodriguez (assistant hitting); 54 Carl Willis (pitching)

== Game log ==
Past games legend
Red Sox Win	Red Sox Loss	Game postponed	Clinched Playoff Spot	Clinched Division
Boldface text denotes a Red Sox pitcher

Boston Red Sox 2017 Season Game Log — Season Record: (93–69)
April (13–11)

#	Date Time (ET)	Opponent	Score	Win	Loss	Save	Stadium	Attendance	Record	Box/ Streak
1	April 3	Pirates	5–3	**Porcello** (1–0)	Cole (0–1)	**Kimbrel** (1)	**Fenway Park**	36,594	1–0	W1
2	April 5	Pirates	3–0 (12)	**Kelly** (1–0)	Bastardo (0–1)	—	**Fenway Park**	36,167	2–0	W2
—	April 6	Pirates	Postponed (rain). Makeup date: April 13.							
3	April 7	@ Tigers	5–6	Rodríguez (1–0)	**Hembree** (0–1)	—	Comerica Park	45,013	2–1	L1
4	April 8	@ Tigers	1–4	Zimmermann (1–0)	**Rodríguez** (0–1)	Wilson (1)	Comerica Park	32,363	2–2	L2
5	April 9	@ Tigers	7–5	**Barnes** (1–0)	Rondon (0–1)	**Kimbrel** (2)	Comerica Park	33,662	3–2	W1
6	April 10	@ Tigers	1–2	Wilson (1–0)	**Sale** (0–1)	Rodríguez (2)	Comerica Park	24,672	3–3	L1
7	April 11	Orioles	8–1	**Pomeranz** (1–0)	Bundy (1–1)	—	**Fenway Park**	37,497	4–3	W1
8	April 12	Orioles	5–12	Givens (2–0)	**Wright** (0–1)	—	**Fenway Park**	32,211	4–4	L1
9	April 13	Pirates	4–3	**Barnes** (2–0)	Nicasio (0–2)	**Kimbrel** (3)	**Fenway Park**	32,400	5–4	W1
10	April 14	Rays	5–10	Archer (2–0)	**Porcello** (1–1)	—	**Fenway Park**	36,813	5–5	L1
11	April 15	Rays	2–1	**Sale** (1–1)	Hunter (0–1)	**Kimbrel** (4)	**Fenway Park**	36,686	6–5	W1
12	April 16	Rays	7–5	**Kelly** (2–0)	Farquhar (0–1)	**Kimbrel** (5)	**Fenway Park**	36,209	7–5	W2
13	April 17	Rays	4–3	**Wright** (1–1)	Snell (0–2)	**Kimbrel** (6)	**Fenway Park**	37,318	8–5	W3
14	April 18	@ Blue Jays	8–7	**Johnson** (1–0)	Stroman (1–2)	—	Rogers Centre	29,281	9–5	W4
15	April 19	@ Blue Jays	0–3	Liriano (1–1)	**Porcello** (1–2)	Osuna (1)	Rogers Centre	30,842	9–6	L1
16	April 20	@ Blue Jays	4–1 (10)	**Kimbrel** (1–0)	Grilli (0–2)	—	Rogers Centre	44,283	10–6	W1
17	April 21	@ Orioles	0–2	Bundy (3–1)	**Pomeranz** (1–1)	Brach (3)	Camden Yards	34,442	10–7	L1
18	April 22	@ Orioles	2–4	Aquino (1–0)	**Wright** (1–2)	O'Day (1)	Camden Yards	35,457	10–8	L2
19	April 23	@ Orioles	6–2	**Rodríguez** (1–1)	Gausman (1–2)	**Kimbrel** (7)	Camden Yards	35,522	11–8	W1
—	April 25	Yankees	Postponed (rain). Makeup date: July 16.							
20	April 26	Yankees	1–3	Severino (2–1)	**Porcello** (1–3)	Chapman (5)	**Fenway Park**	32,072	11–9	L1
21	April 27	Yankees	0–3	Tanaka (3–1)	**Sale** (1–2)	—	**Fenway Park**	34,054	11–10	L2
22	April 28	Cubs	5–4	**Pomeranz** (2–1)	Arrieta (3–1)	Kimbrel (8)	**Fenway Park**	37,054	12–10	W1
23	April 29	Cubs	4–7	Lackey (2–3)	**Wright** (1–3)	Davis (6)	**Fenway Park**	36,776	12–11	L1
24	April 30	Cubs	6–2	**Barnes** (3–0)	Uehara (0–2)	—	**Fenway Park**	36,916	13–11	W1

May (16–12)

#	Date Time (ET)	Opponent	Score	Win	Loss	Save	Stadium	Attendance	Record	Box/ Streak
25	May 1	Orioles	2–5	Bundy (4–1)	**Porcello** (1–4)	Brach (5)	**Fenway Park**	33,489	13–12	L1
26	May 2	Orioles	5–2	**Sale** (2–2)	Asher (1–1)	**Kimbrel** (9)	**Fenway Park**	32,932	14–12	W1
27	May 3	Orioles	4–2	**Pomeranz** (3–1)	Gausman (1–3)	**Kimbrel** (10)	**Fenway Park**	33,162	15–12	W2
28	May 4	Orioles	3–8	Wilson (2–1)	**Kendrick** (0–1)	—	**Fenway Park**	36,563	15–13	L1
29	May 5	@ Twins	4–5	Kintzler (1–0)	**Barnes** (3–1)	—	Target Field	28,707	15–14	L2
30	May 6	@ Twins	11–1	**Porcello** (2–4)	Tepesch (0–1)	—	Target Field	30,859	16–14	W1
31	May 7	@ Twins	17–6	**Sale** (3–2)	Santana (5–1)	—	Target Field	31,763	17–14	W2
32	May 9	@ Brewers	7–11	Torres (2–3)	**Pomeranz** (3–2)	—	Miller Park	22,524	17–15	L1
33	May 10	@ Brewers	4–7	Scahill (1–1)	**Kendrick** (0–2)		Miller Park	23,095	17–16	L2
34	May 11	@ Brewers	4–1	**Kimbrel** (2–0)	Feliz (0–4)	—	Miller Park	26,499	18–16	W1
35	May 12	Rays	4–5	Cobb (3–3)	**Porcello** (2–5)	Colomé (9)	**Fenway Park**	36,496	18–17	L1
36	May 13	Rays	6–3	**Sale** (4–2)	Snell(0–4)	**Kimbrel** (11)	**Fenway Park**	35,447	19–17	W1
37	May 14	Rays	2–11	Andriese (3–1)	**Pomeranz** (3–3)	—	**Fenway Park**	35,080	19–18	L1
38	May 16	@ Cardinals	6–3	**Rodríguez** (2–1)	Lynn (4–2)	**Kimbrel** (12)	Busch Stadium	41,514	20–18	W1
39	May 17	@ Cardinals	5–4 (13)	**Abad** (1–0)	Tuivailala (2–1)	**Taylor** (1)	Busch Stadium	44,365	21–18	W2
40	May 18	@ Athletics	3–8	Gray (1–1)	**Velázquez** (0–1)	—	Oakland Coliseum	12,016	21–19	L1
41	May 19	@ Athletics	2–3 (10)	Dull (2–2)	**Hembree** (0–2)	—	Oakland Coliseum	24,728	21–20	L2
42	May 20	@ Athletics	3–8	Manaea (2–3)	**Taylor** (0–1)	—	Oakland Coliseum	20,235	21–21	L3
43	May 21	@ Athletics	12–3	**Rodríguez** (3–1)	Triggs (5–3)	—	Oakland Coliseum	20,691	22–21	W1
44	May 23	Rangers	11–6	**Porcello** (3–5)	Cashner (1–4)	—	**Fenway Park**	34,769	23–21	W2
45	May 24	Rangers	9–4	**Sale** (5–2)	Dyson (1–5)	—	**Fenway Park**	36,089	24–21	W3
46	May 25	Rangers	6–2	**Pomeranz** (4–3)	Martinez (1–3)	—	**Fenway Park**	33,484	25–21	W4
47	May 26	Mariners	3–0	**Rodríguez** (4–1)	Gallardo (2–5)	**Kimbrel** (13)	**Fenway Park**	35,080	26–21	W5
48	May 27	Mariners	6–0	**Johnson** (2–0)	Whalen (0–1)	—	**Fenway Park**	36,985	27–21	W6
49	May 28	Mariners	0–5	Bergman (2–2)	**Porcello** (3–6)	—	**Fenway Park**	37,174	27–22	L1
50	May 29	@ White Sox	4–5	Minaya (1–0)	**Barnes** (3–2)	Robertson (8)	Guaranteed Rate Field	27,148	27–23	L2
51	May 30	@ White Sox	13–7	**Sale** (6–2)	Quintana (2–7)	**Kimbrel** (14)	Guaranteed Rate Field	21,852	28–23	W1
52	May 31	@ White Sox	4–1	**Pomeranz** (5–3)	Swarzak (2–1)	**Kimbrel** (15)	Guaranteed Rate Field	19,075	29–23	W2

June (16–12)

#	Date	Opponent	Score	Win	Loss	Save	Stadium	Attendance	Record	Box/ Streak
53	June 1	@ Orioles	5–7	Miley (2–3)	**Rodríguez** (4–2)	—	Camden Yards	20,150	29–24	L1
54	June 2	@ Orioles	2–3	Asher (2–3)	**Porcello** (3–7)	Brach (11)	Camden Yards	33,193	29–25	L2
55	June 3	@ Orioles	5–2	**Price** (1–0)	Bundy (6–4)	**Kimbrel** (16)	Camden Yards	35,470	30–25	W1
56	June 4	@ Orioles	7–3	**Sale** (7–2)	Tillman (1–3)	—	Camden Yards	31,819	31–25	W2
57	June 6	@ Yankees	5–4	**Pomeranz** (6–3)	Tanaka (5–6)	**Kimbrel** (17)	Yankee Stadium	41,516	32–25	W3
58	June 7	@ Yankees	0–8	Sabathia (7–2)	**Porcello** (3–8)	—	Yankee Stadium	44,380	32–26	L1
59	June 8	@ Yankees	1–9	Pineda (7–3)	**Price** (1–1)	—	Yankee Stadium	46,194	32–27	L2
60	June 9	Tigers	5–3	**Barnes** (4–2)	Wilson (1–3)	**Kimbrel** (18)	**Fenway Park**	36,853	33–27	W1
61	June 10	Tigers	11–3	**Sale** (9–2)	Saupold (1–1)	—	**Fenway Park**	37,162	34–27	W2
62	June 11	Tigers	3–8	Norris (3–4)	**Pomeranz** (6–4)	—	**Fenway Park**	35,457	34–28	L1
63	June 12	Phillies	6–5 (11)	**Barnes** (5–2)	Fien (0–1)	—	**Fenway Park**	36,757	35–28	W1
64	June 13	Phillies	4–3 (12)	**Abad** (2–0)	García (1–1)	—	**Fenway Park**	37,141	36–28	W2
65	June 14	@ Phillies	7–3	**Velázquez** (1–1)	Hellickson (5–5)	—	Citizens Bank Park	28,263	37–28	W3
66	June 15	@ Phillies	0–1	Neshek (2–1)	**Sale** (8–3)	Neris (6)	Citizens Bank Park	30,729	37–29	L1
67	June 16	@ Astros	2–1	**Kelly** (3–0)	Harris (2–2)	**Kimbrel** (19)	Minute Maid Park	36,189	38–29	W1
68	June 17	@ Astros	1–7	Paulino (1–0)	**Porcello** (3–9)	—	Minute Maid Park	41,017	38–30	L1
69	June 18	@ Astros	6–5	**Price** (2–1)	Musgrove (4–6)	**Kimbrel** (20)	Minute Maid Park	38,389	39–30	W1
70	June 19	@ Royals	2–4	Hammel (4–6)	**Boyer** (0–1)	Herrera (16)	Kauffman Stadium	27,992	39–31	L1
71	June 20	@ Royals	8–3	**Sale** (9–3)	Strahm (2–4)	—	Kauffman Stadium	25,983	40–31	W1
72	June 21	@ Royals	4–6	Soria (3–2)	**Scott** (0–1)	Herrera (17)	Kauffman Stadium	30,826	40–32	L1
73	June 23	Angels	9–4	Porcello (4–9)	**Meyer** (3–4)	—	**Fenway Park**	37,034	41–32	W1
74	June 24	Angels	3–6	Ramirez (7–5)	**Price** (2–2)	Parker (1)	**Fenway Park**	36,868	41–33	L1
75	June 25	Angels	2–4	Bridwell (2–0)	**Fister** (0–1)	Petit (1)	**Fenway Park**	36,474	41–34	L2
76	June 26	Twins	4–1	**Sale** (10–3)	Berríos (7–2)	**Kimbrel** (21)	**Fenway Park**	37,172	42–34	W1
77	June 27	Twins	9–2	**Pomeranz** (7–4)	Santiago (4–7)	—	**Fenway Park**	36,804	43–34	W2
78	June 28	Twins	1–4	Mejia (3–3)	**Porcello** (4–10)	Kintzler (21)	**Fenway Park**	37,487	43–35	L1
79	June 29	Twins	6–3	**Price** (3–2)	Gibson (4–6)	**Kimbrel** (22)	**Fenway Park**	37,445	44–35	W1
80	June 30	@ Blue Jays	7–4 (11)	**Boyer** (1–1)	Loup (2–2)	**Kimbrel** (23)	Rogers Centre	41,357	45–35	W2

July (13–14)

#	Date	Opponent	Score	Win	Loss	Save	Stadium	Attendance	Record	Box/ Streak
81	July 1	@ Blue Jays	7–1	**Sale** (11–3)	Liriano (4–4)	—	Rogers Centre	46,672	46–35	W3
82	July 2	@ Blue Jays	15–1	**Pomeranz** (8–4)	Biagini (2–8)	**Abad** (1)	Rogers Centre	46,696	47–35	W4
83	July 3	@ Rangers	7–5 (11)	**Hembree** (1–2)	Frieri (0–1)	—	Globe Life Park	45,448	48–35	W5
84	July 4	@ Rangers	11–4	**Price** (4–2)	Darvish (6–7)	—	Globe Life Park	43,267	49–35	W6
85	July 5	@ Rangers	2–8	Cashner (4–7)	**Fister** (0–2)	—	Globe Life Park	32,276	49–36	L1
86	July 6	@ Rays	1–4	Faria (4–0)	**Sale** (11–4)	Colomé (23)	Tropicana Field	23,375	49–37	L2
87	July 7	@ Rays	8–3	**Pomeranz** (9–4)	Odorizzi (5–4)	—	Tropicana Field	24,842	50–37	W1
88	July 8	@ Rays	0–1	Cobb (7–6)	**Porcello** (4–11)	Colomé (24)	Tropicana Field	23,419	50–38	L1
89	July 9	@ Rays	3–5	Boxberger (1–0)	**Kelly** (3–1)	Colomé (25)	Tropicana Field	20,812	50–39	L2
ASG	July 11	All-Star Game	**AL** 2–1 (10) NL	**Kimbrel** (**AL**, BOS) (1–0)	Davis (NL, CHC (0–1)	Miller (**AL**, CLE) (1)	Marlins Park, Miami, FL	37,188		Box
ASG	The Red Sox were represented in the All-Star game by Mookie Betts, Craig Kimbrel and Chris Sale. Sale started the game for the AL, while Kimbrel appeared in the closer role.									
90	July 14	Yankees	5–4	**Scott** (1–1)	Chapman (2–1)	—	**Fenway Park**	37,570	51–39	W1
91	July 15	Yankees	1–4 (16)	Heller (1–0)	**Fister** (0–3)	–	Fenway Park	36,936	51–40	L1
92	July 16	Yankees	0–3	Sabathia (8–3)	**Porcello** (4–12)	Chapman (9)	Fenway Park	37,343	51–41	L2
93	July 16	Yankees	3–0	**Price** (5–2)	Tanaka (7–9)	**Kimbrel** (24)	**Fenway Park**	36,719	52–41	W1
94	July 17	Blue Jays	3–4	Tepera (5–1)	**Hembree** (1–3)	Osuna (23)	**Fenway Park**	36,144	52–42	L1
95	July 18	Blue Jays	5–4 (15)	**Velázquez** (2–1)	Bolsinger (0–3)	—	**Fenway Park**	36,488	53–42	W1
96	July 19	Blue Jays	5–1	Pomeranz (10–4)	**Sanchez** (1–3)	—	**Fenway Park**	37,360	54–42	W2
97	July 20	Blue Jays	6–8	Leone (2–0)	**Fister** (0–4)	Osuna (24)	**Fenway Park**	37,094	54–43	L1
98	July 21	@ Angels	6–2	**Sale** (12–4)	Nolasco (4–11)	–	Angel Stadium	37,714	55–43	W1
99	July 22	@ Angels	3–7	Ramírez (9–8)	**Price** (5–3)	—	Angel Stadium	43,829	55–44	L1
100	July 23	@ Angels	2–3	Bridwell (4–1)	**Porcello** (4–13)	Norris (15)	Angel Stadium	40,471	55–45	L2
101	July 24	@ Mariners	0–4	Paxton (10–3)	**Rodríguez** (4–3)		Safeco Field	29,262	55–46	L3
102	July 25	@ Mariners	5–6 (13)	Zych (5–2)	**Fister** (0–5)		Safeco Field	28,992	55–47	L4
103	July 26	@ Mariners	4–0	**Sale** (13–4)	Moore (1–3)	**Kimbrel** (25)	Safeco Field	39,797	56–47	W1
104	July 28	Royals	2–4	Vargas (13–4)	**Porcello** (4–14)	Herrera (22)	**Fenway Park**	37,321	56–48	L1
105	July 29	Royals	9–8 (10)	**Barnes** (6–2)	Minor (5–3)	—	**Fenway Park**	36,912	57–48	W1
106	July 30	Royals	3–5	Hammel (5–8)	**Barnes** (6–3)	Herrera (23)	**Fenway Park**	36,480	57–49	L1
107	July 31	Indians	6–2	**Fister** (1–5)	Clevinger (5–4)		**Fenway Park**	37,169	58–49	W1

August (18–9)

#	Date	Opponent	Score	Win	Loss	Save	Stadium	Attendance	Record	Box/ Streak
108	August 1	Indians	12–10	**Kimbrel** (3–0)	Allen (0–6)	—	**Fenway Park**	37,126	59–49	W2
—	August 2	Indians	Postponed (rain). Makeup date: August 14.							
109	August 3	White Sox	9–5	**Porcello** (5–14)	González (5–10)	—	**Fenway Park**	37,442	60–49	W3
110	August 4	White Sox	3–2 (11)	**Hembree** (2–3)	Bummer (0–2)	—	**Fenway Park**	36,612	61–49	W4
111	August 5	White Sox	4–1	**Pomeranz** (11–4)	Shields (2–4)	**Kimbrel** (26)	**Fenway Park**	36,599	62–49	W5
112	August 6	White Sox	6–3	**Fister** (2–5)	Pelfrey (3–10)	**Kimbrel** (27)	**Fenway Park**	37,283	63–49	W6
113	August 8	@ Rays	2–0	**Sale** (14–4)	Pruitt (6–3)	**Kimbrel** (28)	Tropicana Field	22,328	64–49	W7
114	August 9	@ Rays	8–2	**Porcello** (6–14)	Odorizzi (6–5)	—	Tropicana Field	11,853	65–49	W8
115	August 11	@ Yankees	4–5	Warren (3–2)	**Reed** (1–3)	Chapman (15)	Yankee Stadium	46,509	65–50	L1
116	August 12	@ Yankees	10–5	**Pomeranz** (12–4)	Severino (9–5)	—	Yankee Stadium	47,241	66–50	W1
117	August 13	@ Yankees	3–2 (10)	**Kimbrel** (4–0)	Chapman (4–2)	—	Yankee Stadium	46,610	67–50	W2
118	August 14	Indians	3–7	Bauer (11–8)	**Fister** (2–6)	—	**Fenway Park**	37,430	67–51	L1
119	August 15	Cardinals	10–4	**Porcello** (7–14)	Leake (7–11)	—	**Fenway Park**	37,345	68–51	W1
120	August 16	Cardinals	5–4	**Kimbrel** (5–0)	Duke (0–1)	—	**Fenway Park**	37,181	69–51	W2
121	August 18	Yankees	9–6	**Reed** (2–3)	Kahnle (2–4)	**Kimbrel** (29)	**Fenway Park**	36,784	70–51	W3
122	August 19	Yankees	3–4	Sabathia (10–5)	**Sale** (14–5)	Betances (9)	**Fenway Park**	36,784	70–52	L1
123	August 20	Yankees	5–1	**Porcello** (8–14)	Gray (7–8)		**Fenway Park**	36,911	71–52	W1
124	August 21	@ Indians	4–5	Allen (1–6)	**Workman** (0–1)	—	Progressive Field	21,428	71–53	L1
125	August 22	@ Indians	9–1	**Fister** (3–6)	Carrasco (12–6)		Progressive Field	19,563	72–53	W1
126	August 23	@ Indians	6–1	**Pomeranz** (13–4)	Kluber (12–4)		Progressive Field	25,346	73–53	W2
127	August 24	@ Indians	6–13	Bauer (13–8)	**Sale** (14–6)		Progressive Field	21,643	73–54	L1
128	August 25	Orioles	3–16	Hellickson (8–7)	**Porcello** (8–15)	—	**Fenway Park**	37,191	73–55	L2
129	August 26	Orioles	0–7	Gausman (10–9)	**Rodríguez** (4–4)	—	**Fenway Park**	36,655	73–56	L3
130	August 27	Orioles	1–2	Miley (8–10)	**Fister** (3–7)	Brach (17)	**Fenway Park**	36,625	73–57	L4
131	August 28	@ Blue Jays	6–5	**Pomeranz** (14–4)	Barnes (2–5)	**Kimbrel** (30)	Rogers Centre	35,630	74–57	W1
132	August 29	@ Blue Jays	3–0	**Sale** (15–6)	Anderson (2–3)	**Kimbrel** (31)	Rogers Centre	34,674	75–57	W2
133	August 30	@ Blue Jays	7–1	**Porcello** (9–15)	Koehler (1–7)		Rogers Centre	37,693	76–57	W3
134	August 31	@ Yankees	2–6	Sabathia (11–5)	**Rodríguez** (4–5)		Yankee Stadium	43,309	76–58	L1

September / October (17–11)

#	Date	Opponent	Score	Win	Loss	Save	Stadium	Attendance	Record	Box/ Streak
135	September 1	@ Yankees	4–1	**Fister** (4–7)	Gray (8–9)	**Kimbrel** (32)	Yankee Stadium	42,332	77–58	W1
136	September 2	@ Yankees	1–5	Tanaka (11–10)	**Pomeranz** (14–5)	—	Yankee Stadium	46,536	77–59	L1
137	September 3	@ Yankees	2–9	Severino (12–6)	**Sale** (15–7)	—	Yankee Stadium	46,717	77–60	L2
138	September 4	Blue Jays	4–10	Happ (7–10)	**Porcello** (9–16)	—	**Fenway Park**	34,311	77–61	L3
139	September 5	Blue Jays	3–2 (19)	**Velázquez** (3–1)	Rowley (1–2)		**Fenway Park**	33,009	78–61	W1
140	September 6	Blue Jays	6–1	**Fister** (5–7)	Biagini (3–10)	—	**Fenway Park**	33,190	79–61	W2
141	September 8	Rays	9–3	**Pomeranz** (15–5)	Archer (9–9)	—	**Fenway Park**	34,781	80–61	W3
142	September 9	Rays	9–0	**Sale** (16–7)	Andriese (5–3)	—	**Fenway Park**	36,734	81–61	W4
143	September 10	Rays	1–4	Cobb (11–9)	**Porcello** (9–17)	Colomé (43)	**Fenway Park**	35,859	81–62	L1
144	September 12	Athletics	11–1	**Rodríguez** (5–5)	Manaea (10–10)	—	**Fenway Park**	34,355	82–62	W1
145	September 13	Athletics	3–7	Cotton (8–10)	**Fister** (5–8)	—	**Fenway Park**	36,366	82–63	L1
146	September 14	Athletics	6–2	**Pomeranz** (16–5)	Gossett (4–9)	—	**Fenway Park**	35,470	83–63	W1
147	September 15	@ Rays	13–6 (15)	**Workman** (1–1)	Pruitt (7–5)	—	Tropicana Field	16,006	84–63	W2
148	September 16	@ Rays	3–1	**Porcello** (10–17)	Cobb (11–10)	**Kimbrel** (33)	Tropicana Field	14,942	85–63	W3
149	September 17	@ Rays	2–3	Odorizzi (9–8)	**Rodríguez** (5–6)	Colomé (45)	Tropicana Field	14,936	85–64	L1
150	September 18	@ Orioles	10–8 (11)	**Barnes** (7–3)	Castro (3–2)	**Smith** (1)	Camden Yards	16,716	86–64	W1
151	September 19	@ Orioles	1–0 (11)	**Kelly** (4–1)	Brach (4–5)	**Barnes** (1)	Camden Yards	21,449	87–64	W2
152	September 20	@ Orioles	9–0	**Sale** (17–7)	Miley (8–14)	—	Camden Yards	16,906	88–64	W3
153	September 22	@ Reds	5–4	**Price** (6–3)	Romano (5–7)	**Kimbrel** (34)	Great American Ball Park	23,463	89–64	W4
154	September 23	@ Reds	5–0	**Rodríguez** (6–6)	Stephenson (5–6)	—	Great American Ball Park	36,076	90–64	W5
155	September 24	@ Reds	5–4	**Scott** (2–1)	Iglesias (3–3)	**Kimbrel** (35)	Great American Ball Park	25,545	91–64	W6
156	September 25	Blue Jays	4–6	Anderson (4–4)	**Pomeranz** (16–6)	Osuna (38)	**Fenway Park**	33,940	91–65	L1
157	September 26	Blue Jays	4–9	Happ (10–11)	**Sale** (17–8)	—	**Fenway Park**	33,999	91–66	L2
158	September 27	Blue Jays	10–7	**Porcello** (11–17)	Estrada (10–9)	—	**Fenway Park**	34,445	92–66	W1
159	September 28	Astros	2–12	Peacock (13–2)	**Rodríguez** (6–7)	—	**Fenway Park**	34,222	92–67	L1
160	September 29	Astros	2–3	Morton (14–7)	**Fister** (5–9)	Giles (33)	**Fenway Park**	36,623	92–68	L2
161	September 30	Astros	6–3	**Pomeranz** (17–6)	McCullers Jr. (7–4)	—	**Fenway Park**	35,722	93–68	W1
162	October 1	Astros	3–4	McHugh (5–2)	**Abad** (2–1)	Clippard (5)	**Fenway Park**	34,517	93–69	L1

=== Postseason game log ===
Boston Red Sox 2017 Postseason Game Log
American League Division Series vs. Houston Astros (1–3)

#	Date	Opponent	Score	Win	Loss	Save	Stadium	Attendance	Series	Box/ Streak
1	October 5	@ Astros	2–8	Verlander (1–0)	**Sale** (0–1)	—	Minute Maid Park	43,102	0–1	L1
2	October 6	@ Astros	2–8	Keuchel (1–0)	**Pomeranz** (0–1)	—	Minute Maid Park	43,410	0–2	L2
3	October 8	Astros	10–3	**Kelly** (1–0)	Liriano (0–1)	—	Fenway Park	38,010	1–2	W1
4	October 9	Astros	4–5	Verlander (2–0)	**Sale** (0–2)	Giles (1)	Fenway Park	37,305	1–3	L1
**Red Sox lose series 1–3**

=== Grand slams ===
The Red Sox were the only American League team not to hit a grand slam during the 2017 season.

=== Ejections ===
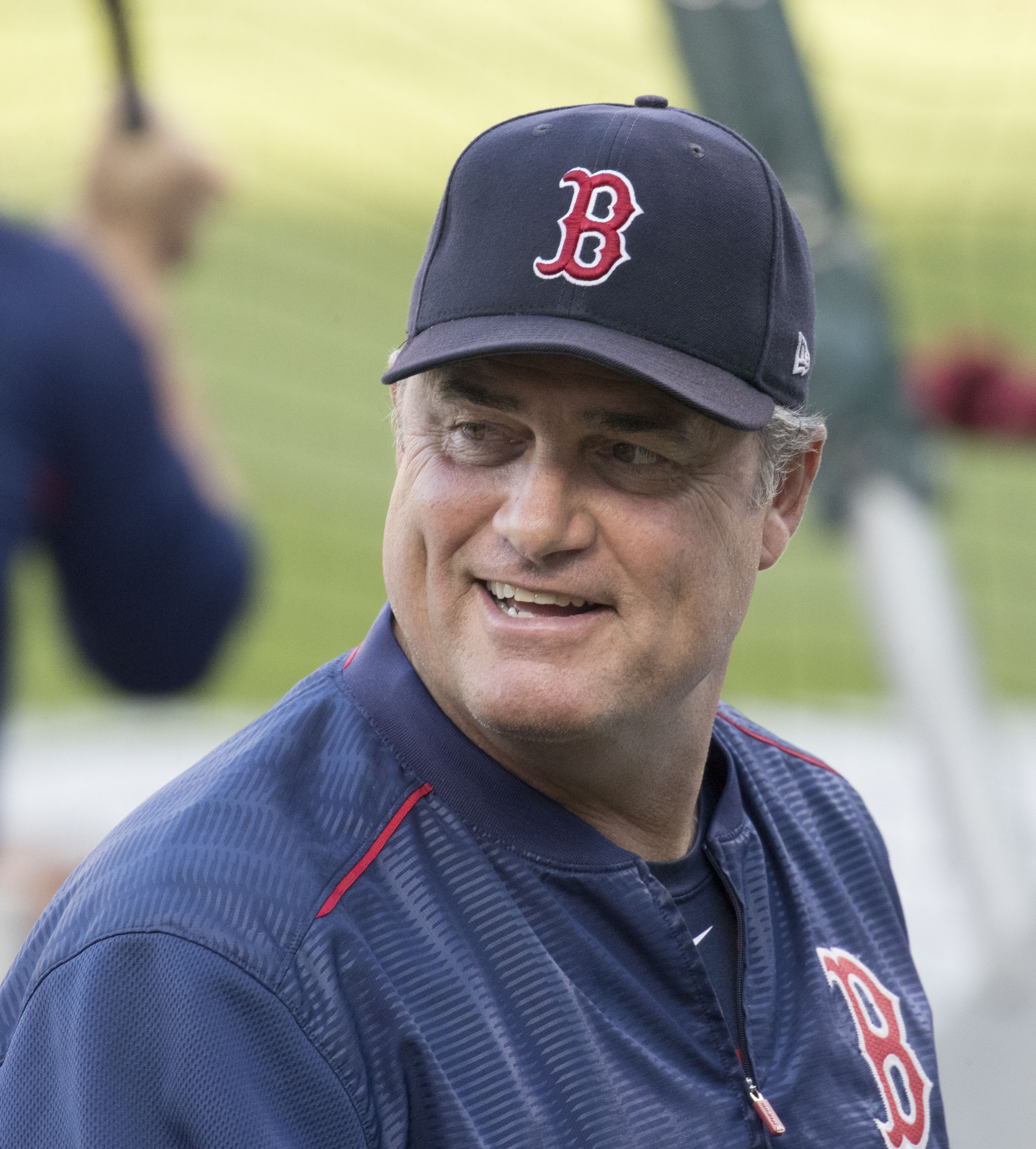
Red Sox manager John Farrell was ejected three times during the 2017 season.

No.	Date	Red Sox personnel	H/A	Opposing team
1	April 21	Brian Butterfield	Away	Baltimore Orioles
2	April 23	Matt Barnes	Away	Baltimore Orioles
3	June 24	John Farrell	Home	Anaheim Angels
4	July 22	John Farrell	Away	Anaheim Angels
5	September 3	Carl Willis	Away	New York Yankees
6	October 9†	John Farrell	Home	Houston Astros

† postseason game

=== Detailed records ===
**American League**
Opponent	Home	Away	Total	Pct.	Runs scored	Runs allowed
**AL East**
Baltimore Orioles	3–6	6–4	9–10	.474	78	86
**Boston Red Sox**	—	—	—	—	—	—
New York Yankees	4–5	4–6	8–11	.421	59	82
Tampa Bay Rays	6–4	5–4	11–8	.579	89	70
Toronto Blue Jays	5–5	8–1	13–6	.684	107	75
	**18–20**	**23–15**	**41–35**	**.539**	**333**	**313**
**AL Central**
Chicago White Sox	4–0	2–1	6–1	.857	43	24
Cleveland Indians	2–1	2–2	4–3	.571	46	39
Detroit Tigers	2–1	1–3	3–4	.429	33	31
Kansas City Royals	1–2	1–2	2–4	.333	28	30
Minnesota Twins	3–1	2–1	5–2	.714	52	22
	**12–5**	**8–9**	**20–14**	**.588**	**202**	**146**
**AL West**
Houston Astros	1–3	2–1	3–4	.429	22	35
Los Angeles Angels	1–2	1–2	2–4	.333	25	26
Oakland Athletics	2–1	1–3	3–4	.429	40	32
Seattle Mariners	2–1	1–2	3–3	.500	18	15
Texas Rangers	3–0	2–1	5–1	.833	46	29
	**9–7**	**7–9**	**16–16**	**.500**	**151**	**137**

**National League**
Opponent	Home	Away	Total	Pct.	Runs scored	Runs allowed
**NL Central**
Milwaukee Brewers	–	1–2	1–2	.333	15	19
St. Louis Cardinals	2–0	2–0	4–0	1.000	26	15
Chicago Cubs	2–1	–	2–1	.667	15	13
Philadelphia Phillies	2–0	1–1	3–1	.750	17	12
Pittsburgh Pirates	3–0	–	3–0	1.000	12	6
Cincinnati Reds	–	3–0	3–0	1.000	15	8
	**9–1**	**7–3**	**16–4**	**.800**	**100**	**73**

== Statistics ==
Please note only the statistics from playing with the Red Sox are included in this list.

=== Regular season batting ===
Note: G = Games played; AB = At bats; R = Runs scored; H = Hits; 2B = Doubles; 3B = Triples; HR = Home runs; RBI = Runs batted in; SB = Stolen bases; BB = Walks; AVG = Batting average; Ref. = Reference

Top ten batters shown. Qualified batters in bold.

Player	G	AB	R	H	2B	3B	HR	RBI	SB	BB	AVG	Ref.
**Andrew Benintendi**	151	573	84	155	26	1	20	90	20	70	.271	
**Mookie Betts**	153	628	101	166	46	2	24	102	26	77	.264	
**Xander Bogaerts**	148	571	94	156	32	6	10	62	15	56	.273	
**Jackie Bradley Jr.**	133	482	58	118	19	3	17	64	8	48	.245	
Rafael Devers	58	222	34	63	14	0	10	30	3	18	.284	
Tzu-Wei Lin	25	56	7	15	0	2	0	2	1	9	.268	
**Mitch Moreland**	149	508	73	125	34	0	22	79	0	57	.246	
Eduardo Núñez	38	165	23	53	12	0	8	27	6	6	.321	
Dustin Pedroia	105	406	46	119	19	0	7	62	4	49	.293	
Christian Vázquez	98	324	43	94	18	2	5	32	7	17	.290	

Rest of the position players
Player	G	AB	R	H	2B	3B	HR	RBI	SB	BB	AVG	Ref.
Chase d'Arnaud	2	1	2	1	0	0	0	0	0	0	1.000	
Rajai Davis	17	36	7	9	2	0	0	2	3	1	.250	
Doug Fister	1	2	0	0	0	0	0	0	0	0	.000	
Marco Hernández	21	58	7	16	3	0	0	2	0	1	.276	
Brock Holt	64	140	20	28	6	0	0	7	2	19	.200	
Brian Johnson	1	2	0	0	0	0	0	0	0	0	.000	
Kyle Kendrick	1	1	0	0	0	0	0	0	0	0	.000	
Sandy León	84	271	32	61	14	0	7	39	0	25	.225	
Deven Marrero	71	171	32	36	9	0	4	27	5	12	.211	
Drew Pomeranz	1	1	0	0	0	0	0	0	0	0	.000	
Rick Porcello	2	4	0	0	0	0	0	0	0	0	.000	
David Price	1	1	0	1	0	0	0	0	0	0	1.000	
**Hanley Ramírez**	133	496	58	120	24	0	23	62	1	51	.242	
Eduardo Rodríguez	3	7	0	0	0	0	0	0	0	0	.000	
Josh Rutledge	37	107	10	24	2	1	0	9	1	9	.224	
Chris Sale	1	3	0	1	1	0	0	0	0	0	.333	
Pablo Sandoval	32	99	10	21	2	0	4	12	0	8	.212	
Steve Selsky	8	9	0	1	1	0	0	0	0	0	.111	
Blake Swihart	6	5	1	1	0	0	0	0	0	2	.200	
Sam Travis	33	76	13	20	6	0	0	1	1	6	.263	
Héctor Velázquez	1	1	0	0	0	0	0	0	0	0	.000	
Chris Young	90	243	30	57	12	2	7	25	3	30	.235	
**Team totals**	**162**	**5669**	**785**	**1461**	**302**	**19**	**168**	**735**	**106**	**571**	**.258**	

Top 10 hitters determined by fWAR:

=== Regular season pitching ===
Note: G = Games pitched; GS = Games started; W = Wins; L = Losses; SV = Saves; ERA = Earned run average; WHIP = Walks plus hits per inning pitched; IP = Innings pitched; H = Hits allowed; R = Total runs allowed; ER = Earned runs allowed; BB = Walks allowed; K = Strikeouts; HLD = Holds; Ref. = Reference

Top ten pitchers shown. Qualified pitchers in bold.

Player	G	GS	W	L	SV	ERA	WHIP	IP	H	R	ER	BB	K	HLD	Ref.
Matt Barnes	70	0	7	3	1	3.88	1.22	69.2	57	31	30	28	83	21	
Doug Fister	18	15	5	9	0	4.88	1.39	90.1	88	55	49	38	83	0	
Heath Hembree	62	0	2	2	0	3.63	1.45	62.0	72	29	25	18	70	14	
Joe Kelly	54	0	4	1	0	2.79	1.19	58.0	42	19	18	27	52	13	
Craig Kimbrel	67	0	5	0	35	1.43	0.68	69.0	33	11	11	14	126	1	
**Drew Pomeranz**	32	32	17	6	0	3.32	1.36	173.2	167	69	64	69	174	0	
**Rick Porcello**	33	33	11	17	0	4.65	1.39	203.1	235	125	105	48	181	0	
David Price	16	11	6	3	0	3.38	1.19	74.2	65	30	28	24	76	1	
Eduardo Rodríguez	25	24	6	7	0	4.19	1.28	137.1	126	66	64	50	150	0	
**Chris Sale**	32	32	17	8	0	2.90	0.97	214.1	165	73	69	43	308	0	

Rest of the pitching staff
Player	G	GS	W	L	SV	ERA	WHIP	IP	H	R	ER	BB	K	HLD	Ref.
Fernando Abad	48	0	2	1	1	3.30	1.24	43.2	40	18	16	14	37	2	
Blaine Boyer	32	0	1	1	0	4.35	1.55	41.1	50	20	20	14	33	2	
Roenis Elías	1	0	0	0	0	0.00	3.00	0.1	0	0	0	1	1	0	
Brian Johnson	5	5	2	0	0	4.33	1.48	27.0	32	13	13	8	21	0	
Kyle Kendrick	2	2	0	2	0	12.96	2.52	8.1	18	12	12	3	3	0	
Austin Maddox	13	0	0	0	0	0.52	0.87	17.1	13	1	1	2	14	0	
Kyle Martin	2	0	0	0	0	3.86	1.71	2.1	2	1	1	2	1	0	
Mitch Moreland	1	0	0	0	0	0.00	2.00	1.0	2	0	0	0	1	0	
Noe Ramirez	2	0	0	0	0	3.86	0.86	4.2	3	2	2	1	4	0	
Addison Reed	29	0	1	1	0	3.33	0.93	27.0	16	10	10	9	28	11	
Robbie Ross Jr.	8	0	0	0	0	7.00	1.89	9.0	12	7	7	5	9	1	
Robby Scott	57	0	2	1	0	3.79	0.98	35.2	22	16	15	13	31	12	
Carson Smith	8	0	0	0	1	1.35	1.35	6.2	7	1	1	2	7	0	
Ben Taylor	14	0	0	1	1	5.19	1.67	17.1	20	10	10	9	18	1	
Héctor Velázquez	8	3	3	1	0	2.92	1.14	24.2	21	8	8	7	19	0	
Brandon Workman	33	0	1	1	0	3.18	1.21	39.2	37	17	14	11	37	4	
Steven Wright	5	5	1	3	0	8.25	1.88	24.0	40	24	22	5	13	0	
**Team totals**	**162**	**162**	**93**	**69**	**39**	**3.70**	**1.25**	**1482.1**	**1384**	**668**	**610**	**465**	**1580**	**83**	

Top 10 pitchers determined by fWAR:

=== Postseason batting ===
Player	G	AB	R	H	2B	3B	HR	RBI	SB	BB	AVG	Ref.
Andrew Benintendi	4	16	2	4	0	0	1	2	0	1	.250	
Mookie Betts	4	16	2	5	2	0	0	0	1	1	.313	
Xander Bogaerts	4	17	2	1	0	0	1	1	0	1	.059	
Jackie Bradley Jr.	4	15	1	3	0	0	1	5	0	0	.200	
Rafael Devers	4	11	3	4	0	0	2	5	0	2	.364	
Sandy León	2	8	0	4	0	0	0	2	0	0	.500	
Deven Marrero	1	2	0	0	0	0	0	0	0	0	.000	
Mitch Moreland	4	13	4	5	2	0	0	0	0	2	.385	
Eduardo Núñez	1	1	0	0	0	0	0	0	0	0	.000	
Dustin Pedroia	4	16	0	2	0	0	0	0	0	2	.125	
Hanley Ramírez	4	14	2	8	2	0	0	3	0	1	.571	
Christian Vázquez	2	6	1	2	0	0	0	0	0	2	.333	
Chris Young	1	2	1	1	1	0	0	0	1	0	.500	

=== Postseason pitching ===
Player	G	GS	W	L	SV	ERA	WHIP	IP	H	R	ER	BB	K	Ref.
Doug Fister	1	0	0	0	0	20.25	3.75	1.1	4	3	3	1	1	
Joe Kelly	2	0	1	0	0	0.00	1.50	2.2	4	0	0	0	1	
Craig Kimbrel	2	0	0	0	0	4.50	2.50	2.0	4	1	1	1	2	
Austin Maddox	2	0	0	0	0	4.50	2.50	2.0	3	1	1	2	2	
Drew Pomeranz	1	0	0	1	0	18.00	3.00	2.0	5	4	4	1	1	
Rick Porcello	2	0	0	0	0	4.50	2.00	4.0	5	2	2	3	4	
David Price	2	0	0	0	0	0.00	1.05	6.2	5	0	0	2	6	
Addison Reed	3	1	0	0	0	7.71	1.71	2.1	3	2	2	1	0	
Eduardo Rodríguez	1	0	0	0	0	INF	INF	0.0	1	2	2	0	0	
Chris Sale	2	1	0	2	0	8.38	1.45	9.2	13	9	9	1	12	
Carson Smith	2	1	0	0	0	0.00	3.00	1.1	2	0	0	2	1	

== Awards and honors ==
Recipient	Award	Date awarded	Ref.
Mookie Betts	AL Player of the Week (May 8–14)	May 15, 2017	
Craig Kimbrel	AL Reliever of the Month (May)	June 2, 2017	
Mookie Betts	All-Star Reserve OF†	July 2, 2017	
Craig Kimbrel	All-Star Reserve RP	July 2, 2017	
Chris Sale	All-Star Starter SP	July 2, 2017	
Mookie Betts	AL Player of the Week (June 26–July 2)	July 3, 2017	
Andrew Benintendi	AL Rookie of the Month (August)	September 3, 2017	
Craig Kimbrel	AL Reliever of the Year	October 28, 2017	
Mookie Betts	AL Gold Glove RF	November 7, 2017	

† Started game in CF due to injury of Mike Trout

== Farm system ==
Level	Team	League	Manager
AAA	Pawtucket Red Sox	International League	Kevin Boles
AA	Portland Sea Dogs	Eastern League	Carlos Febles
A-Advanced	Salem Red Sox	Carolina League	Joe Oliver
A	Greenville Drive	South Atlantic League	Darren Fenster
A-Short Season	Lowell Spinners	New York–Penn League	Iggy Suarez
Rookie	GCL Red Sox	Gulf Coast League	Tom Kotchman
Rookie	DSL Red Sox	Dominican Summer League	Aly González
