= Sandy León =

Venezuelan baseball player (born 1989)

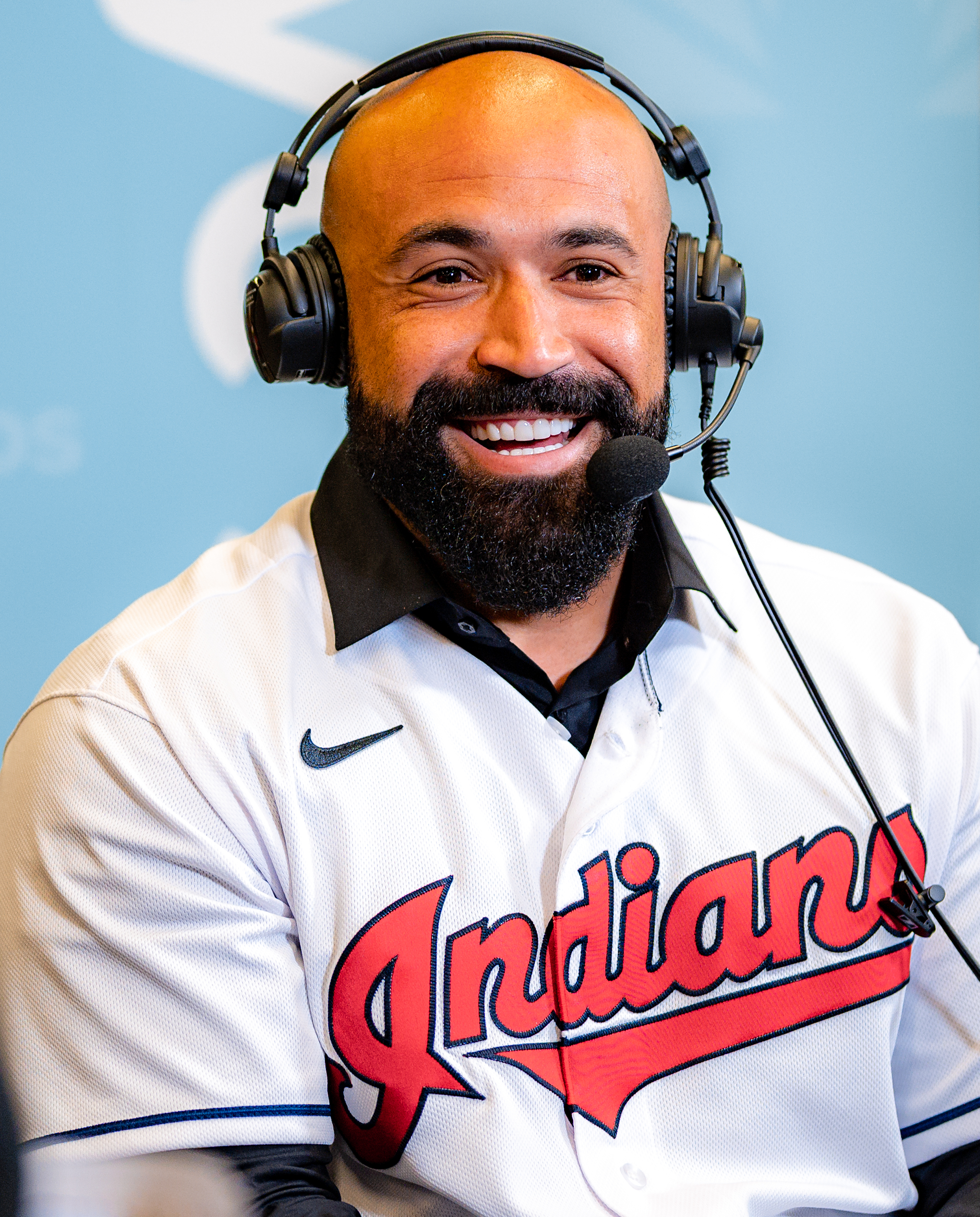
- León with the Cleveland Indians in 2020

Free agent
- Catcher
- Born: March 13, 1989 (age 37); Maracaibo, Venezuela
- Bats: Switch Throws: Right

MLB debut
- May 14, 2012, for the Washington Nationals

MLB statistics (through 2026 season)
- Batting average: .204
- Home runs: 32
- Runs batted in: 152
- Stats at Baseball Reference

Teams
- Washington Nationals (2012–2014); Boston Red Sox (2015–2019); Cleveland Indians (2020); Miami Marlins (2021); Cleveland Guardians (2022); Minnesota Twins (2022); Texas Rangers (2023); Atlanta Braves (2025–2026)

Career highlights and awards
- World Series champion (2018)

Sandy David León López (born March 13, 1989) is a Venezuelan professional baseball catcher who is a free agent. He has previously played in Major League Baseball (MLB) for the Washington Nationals, Boston Red Sox, Cleveland Indians/Guardians, Miami Marlins, Minnesota Twins, Texas Rangers, and Atlanta Braves. He has also played for the Colombia national baseball team.

== Professional career ==
=== Washington Nationals ===
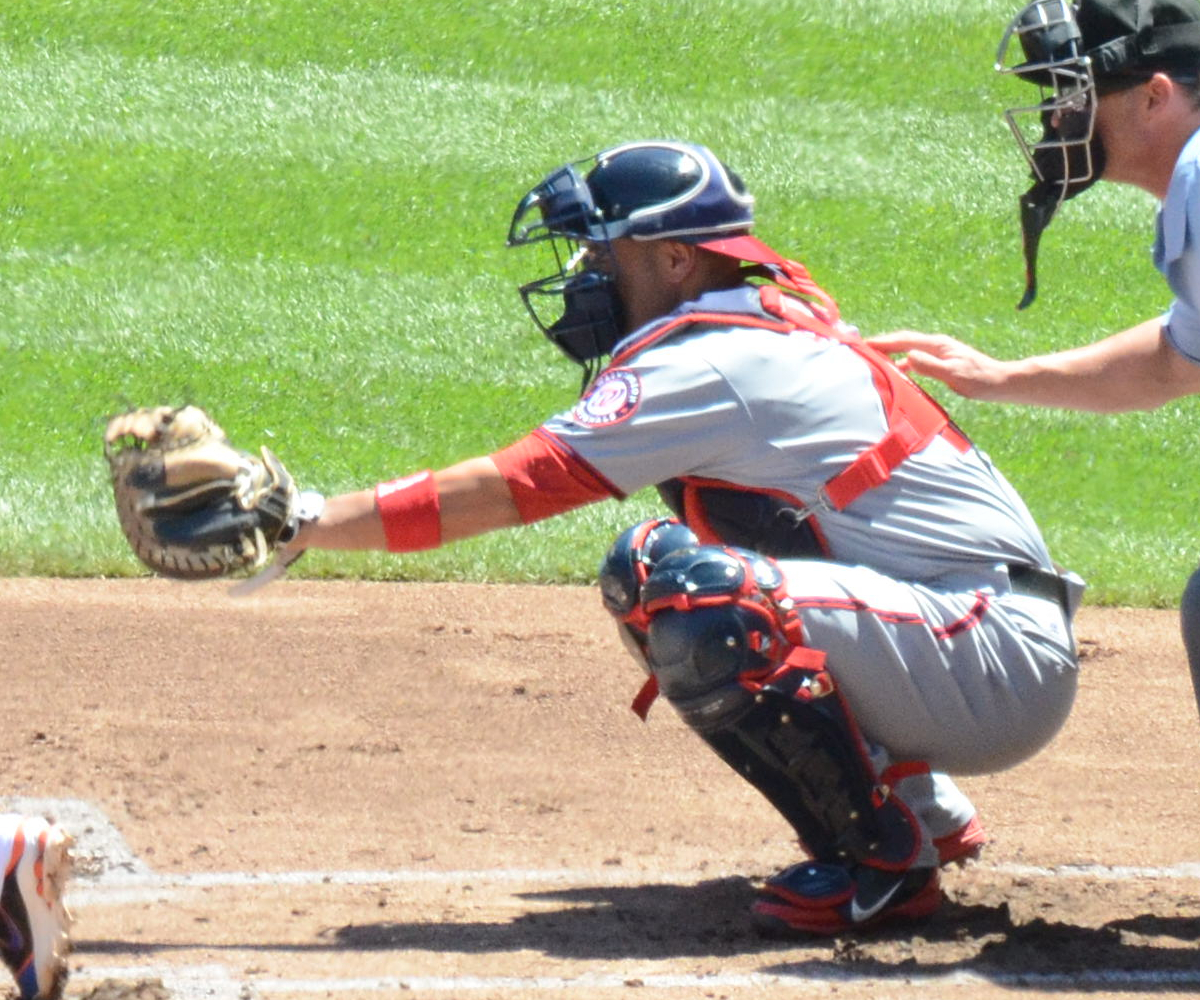
León playing for the Washington Nationals in 2012

León signed with the Washington Nationals on January 17, 2007, and made his professional debut with the Gulf Coast Nationals later that year. He spent two years in the Gulf Coast League before splitting the 2009 season between the Vermont Lake Monsters of the New York–Penn League and the South Atlantic League's Hagerstown Suns. León returned to the Suns for the 2010 season and was promoted to the Potomac Nationals in 2011. He spent time with the Auburn Doubledays, Harrisburg Senators, and Syracuse Chiefs in 2012 before his first major league callup.

León was called up to the majors for the first time on May 13, 2012. He made his Major League debut on May 14, 2012. In the fourth inning of his debut, León sprained his right ankle in a collision with San Diego Padres third baseman Chase Headley at home plate.

=== Boston Red Sox ===
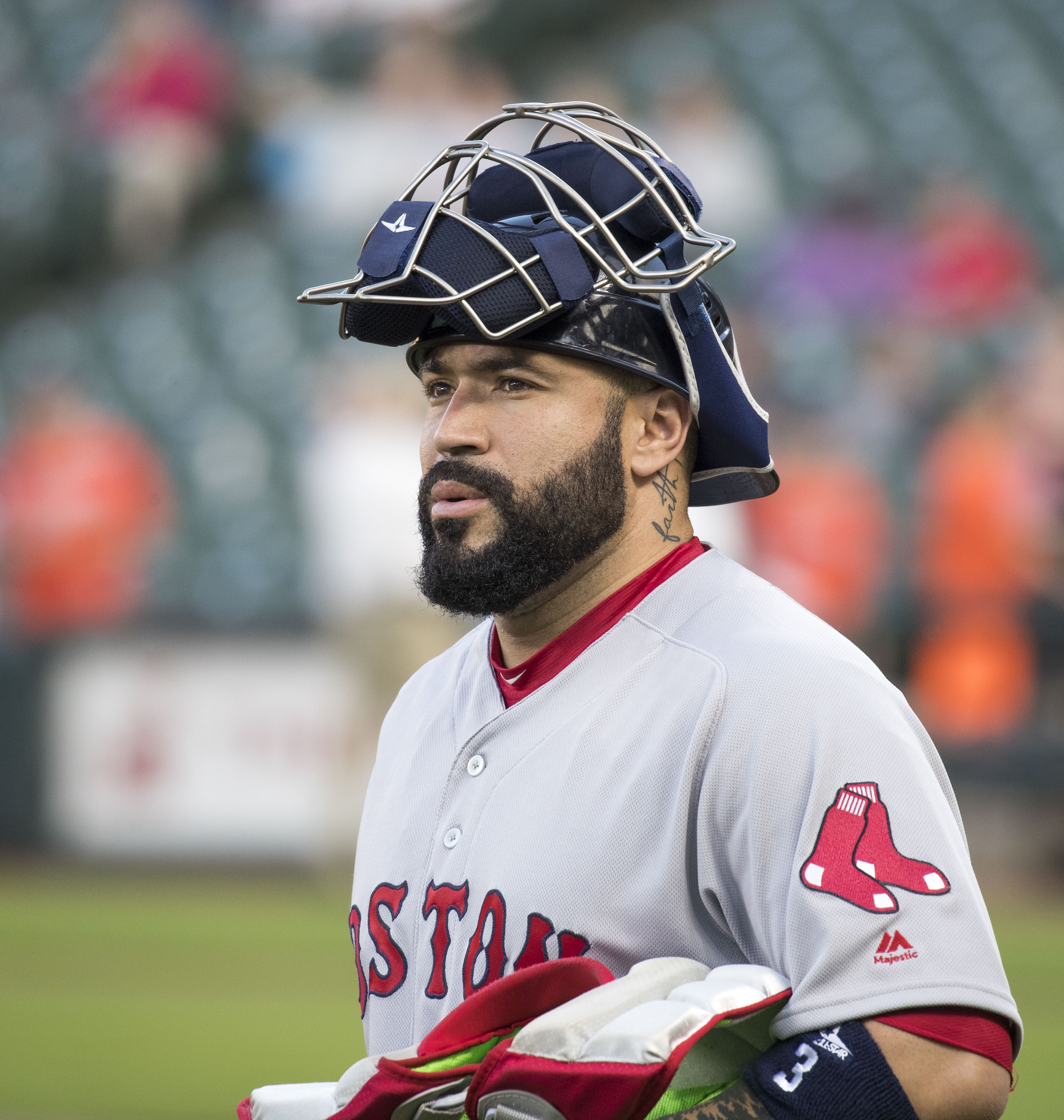
León with the Boston Red Sox in 2017

León was traded to the Boston Red Sox for cash considerations on March 30, 2015. He was designated for assignment on July 21, and on July 30 he was sent down to the Pawtucket Red Sox. He was re-added to the major league roster on September 1. León appeared in 41 games with Boston during the season, batting .184 with no home runs and three RBIs.

León started the 2016 season in the minors, but was promoted to Boston on June 5, when Ryan Hanigan and Blake Swihart went on the disabled list. He finished his MLB season with a .310 batting average in 78 games, with seven home runs and 35 RBIs.

León appeared in 85 games with the Red Sox in 2017, batting .225 with seven home runs and 39 RBIs.

In 2018, León split time at catcher with Christian Vázquez, appearing in 89 games while batting .177 with five home runs and 22 RBIs. The Red Sox finished the year with a 108–54 record and went on to win the 2018 World Series against the Los Angeles Dodgers, with León batting 3-for-6 in the series.

In 2019, León was placed on waivers on March 24, and the Red Sox sent him outright to Triple-A Pawtucket on March 26. He accepted his assignment, rather than electing to forego his 2019 salary and become a free agent. León had his contract selected on April 16, when Blake Swihart was designated for assignment. León was placed on the paternity list on May 17, then activated on May 20, following the birth of a daughter. With the 2019 Red Sox, León appeared in 65 games while batting .192 with five home runs and 19 RBIs.

=== Cleveland Indians ===
On December 2, 2019, León was traded to the Cleveland Indians in exchange for Adenys Bautista. Overall with the 2020 Cleveland Indians, León batted .136 with two home runs and 4 RBIs in 25 games. He became a free agent following the 2020 season.

=== Miami Marlins ===
On January 3, 2021, León signed a minor league contract with the Miami Marlins, which included an invitation to spring training. On April 21, 2021, León was selected to the active roster to help replace the injured Jorge Alfaro. In 84 games with the Marlins, León posted a .183 batting average with 4 home runs and 14 runs batted in. Following the 2021 season, León became a free agent.

=== Cleveland Guardians/Cincinnati Reds ===
On November 22, 2021, León signed a minor league deal with an invitation to major league spring training camp with the Cleveland Guardians. On March 31, 2022, he opted out of his contract and became a free agent after being informed he would not make the Guardians' opening day roster. On April 15, he signed with the Cincinnati Reds on a minor league contract.

=== Cleveland Guardians ===
Facing a shortage of catchers, the Cleveland Guardians sent cash to the Reds in exchange for León on June 28, 2022. León played in a doubleheader that day for Cleveland against the Minnesota Twins. On July 8, 2022, León was designated for assignment. After clearing waivers, León was outrighted to the minor leagues on July 10, 2022.

=== Minnesota Twins ===
On August 2, 2022, León was traded to the Minnesota Twins in exchange for Ian Hamilton. He was selected to the major league roster the following day after Caleb Hamilton was optioned to the Triple-A St. Paul Saints. León appeared in 25 games for Minnesota, slashing .179/.270/.232 with no home runs and 4 RBI. On September 27, it was announced that León would undergo right knee meniscus surgery and miss the remainder of the season.

=== Texas Rangers ===
On January 11, 2023, León signed a minor league contract with the Texas Rangers organization. He requested and was granted released on March 27. The next day, León re-signed with the Rangers on a new minor league contract.

On April 10, León was selected to the active roster following an injury to Mitch Garver. León played in 22 games for Texas, but hit just .146 with 4 RBI before he was designated for assignment on June 14. He cleared waivers and was sent outright to the Triple–A Round Rock Express on June 17. Despite accepting his outright assignment, León requested and was granted his release from the organization on June 21.

Although León was not on the Rangers' roster when the team won the 2023 World Series, he received his second career World Series ring for his contributions to the team during the season.

=== Cleveland Guardians (third stint) ===
On July 1, 2023, León signed a minor league contract with the Cleveland Guardians organization. In 16 games for the Triple–A Columbus Clippers, he batted .220/.361/.400 with 2 home runs and 4 RBI. León elected free agency following the season on November 6.

=== Atlanta Braves ===
On January 17, 2024, León signed a minor league contract with the Kansas City Royals. On March 23, León requested and was granted his release by the Royals.

On April 2, 2024, León signed a minor league contract with the Atlanta Braves. He made 79 appearances for the Triple-A Gwinnett Stripers, batting .181/.328/.262 with five home runs and 26 RBI. On October 29, León re-signed with Atlanta on a minor league contract.

In 47 games for Triple-A Gwinnett, he batted .183 with eight home runs and 14 RBI. On July 21, 2025, the Braves selected León's contract, adding him to their active roster. He made one appearance for Atlanta, serving as a defensive replacement. On August 15, León was removed from the Braves' 40-man roster and sent outright to Triple-A Gwinnett. On September 8, the Braves added León back to their active roster. In five total appearances for Atlanta, he went 1-for-12 (.083) with one home run and three RBI. On October 1, León was removed from the 40-man roster and sent outright to Gwinnett. He elected free agency on October 6.

On October 7, 2025, Leon re-signed with the Braves on a minor league contract. He made 10 appearances for Triple-A Gwinnett, going 4-for-34 (.118) with one RBI and two stolen bases. However, on April 22, 2026, León requested and was granted his release in order to pursue an opportunity in the Mexican League.

=== Saraperos de Saltillo ===
On April 24, 2026, León signed with the Saraperos de Saltillo of the Mexican League. León made 10 appearances for Saltillo, batting .143/.273/.143 with four RBI.

=== Atlanta Braves (second stint) ===
On May 12, 2026, León signed a major league contract with the Atlanta Braves. He appeared in 21 games for Atlanta, slashing .091/.091/.091 with no home runs or RBI. On June 18, León was designated for assignment by the Braves. He cleared waivers and elected free agency on June 21. However, the following day, León re-signed with the Braves on a minor league contract. He elected free agency on November 2.

=== Pitching ===
Throughout his career, León has pitched eight times. He pitched six games in 2021 with the Miami Marlins, finishing the year with a 7.50 ERA in six innings pitched. In 2022, he pitched in one game for the Cleveland Guardians, not allowing a baserunner in two innings pitched. Finally, León pitched one inning with the Texas Rangers in 2023, giving up two runs. Overall, León has a 7.00 ERA in nine innings pitched.

== International career ==
Despite his Venezuelan heritage, León opted to play for the Colombia national baseball team in the 2023 World Baseball Classic. He qualified through residency in Colombia, as well as having a Colombian wife.

== Personal life ==
León and his wife have a son born in 2017, and a daughter born in May 2019. León is a Christian.

== See also ==
- List of Major League Baseball players from Venezuela
