= Austin Maddox =

American baseball player (born 1991)

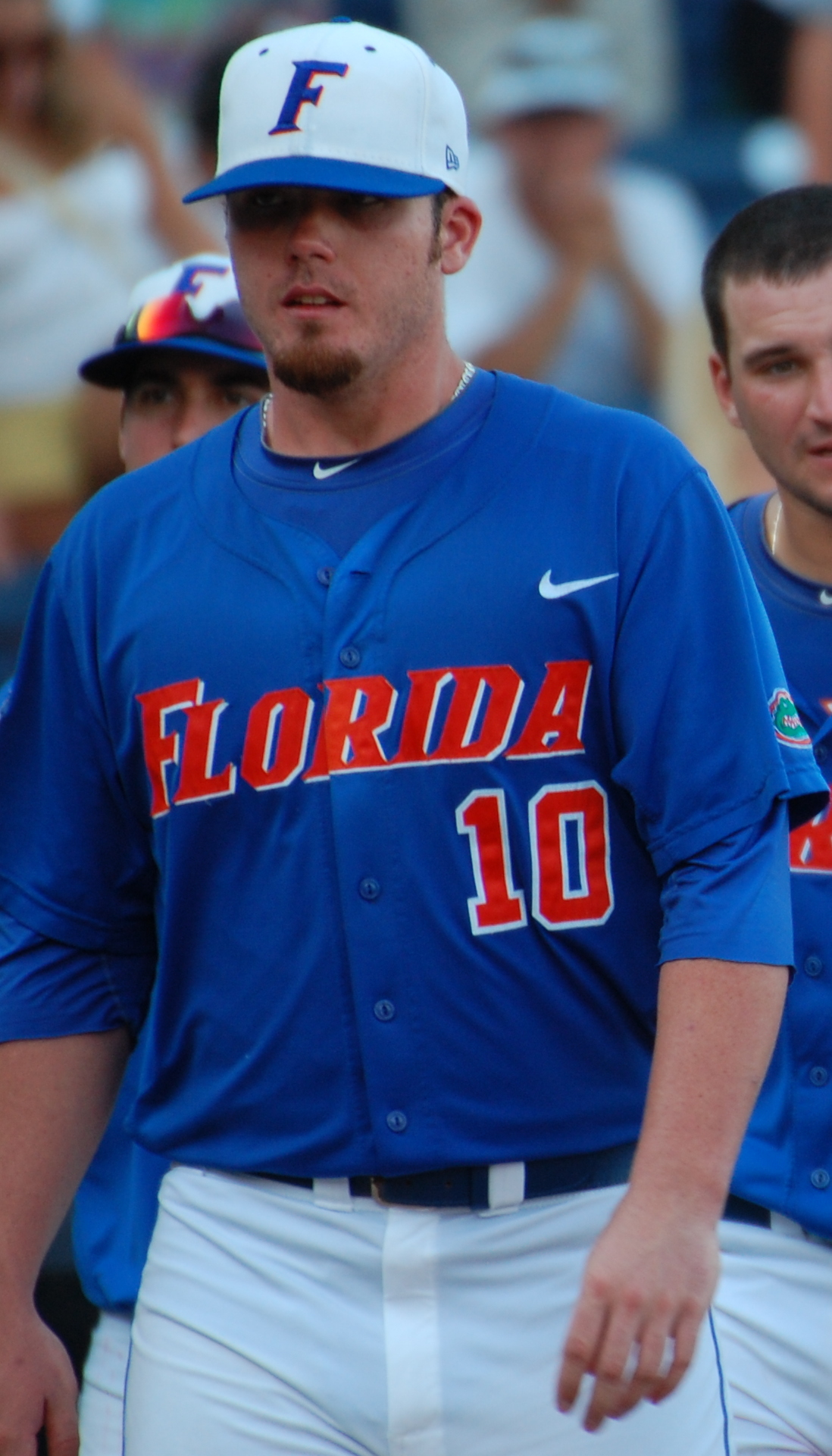
- Maddox at the 2012 College World Series
- Pitcher
- Born: May 13, 1991 (age 35); Jacksonville, Florida, U.S.
- Batted: Right Threw: Right

MLB debut
- June 17, 2017, for the Boston Red Sox

Last MLB appearance
- September 28, 2017, for the Boston Red Sox

MLB statistics
- Win–loss record: 0–0
- Earned run average: 0.52
- Strikeouts: 14
- Stats at Baseball Reference

Teams
- Boston Red Sox (2017)
Medals
Men's baseball
Representing United States
World Junior Baseball Championship
Silver medal – second place	2008 Edmonton	Team

Austin Dean Maddox (born May 13, 1991) is an American former professional baseball pitcher and convicted sex offender. He played in Major League Baseball (MLB) for the Boston Red Sox. He batted and threw right-handed, and is listed at 6 feet 2 inches (1.88 m) and 220 pounds (100 kg).

== Early years ==
Maddox graduated from high school in 2009 as the top catcher in the state of Florida, having batted .544 in his senior year. He was drafted by the Tampa Bay Rays in the 37th round of the 2009 MLB draft, but he did not sign. Instead, he played college baseball at the University of Florida, where he was teammates with future MLB catcher Mike Zunino. Maddox batted .303 in his three seasons with the Gators (2010–2012). Initially a catcher and infielder, he made a total of 53 appearances as a pitcher in 2011 and 2012, striking out 78 and walking 14 in 82 1/3 innings, while compiling a 1.86 earned run average (ERA).

== Professional career ==
Maddox was drafted by the Boston Red Sox in the third round of the 2012 MLB draft, and signed with the team in June 2012.

From 2012 through 2015, Maddox played in the lower levels of Boston's farm system; the Rookie League Gulf Coast League Red Sox, the Class A Short Season Lowell Spinners, the Class A Greenville Drive, and the Class A-Advanced Salem Red Sox. During 2016, he was promoted to the Double-A Portland Sea Dogs and then the Triple-A Pawtucket Red Sox. In 2017, he again played in Portland and Pawtucket, and was called up to the majors for the first time on June 15.

During six years in the minors, 2012 through 2017, Maddox appeared in 143 games, pitching 261 1/3 innings with a 13–18 record, 4.27 ERA, and 1.282 WHIP, while recording 227 strikeouts, 83 walks, and 25 saves.

Maddox made his MLB debut on June 17, 2017, pitching the seventh inning in a Red Sox loss to the Houston Astros; he retired the side without allowing a baserunner. He appeared in one more game in June, one game in July, and then ten games during September. He finished the regular season with 13 appearances for the 2017 Red Sox, allowing just one earned run in 17 1/3 innings pitched (0.52 ERA), with 14 strikeouts and two walks. Maddox was included on Boston's postseason roster for the 2017 American League Division Series. He made two one-inning appearances against the Houston Astros, allowing one earned run (4.50 ERA), with two strikeouts and two walks, as the Red Sox lost to the eventual World Series champions.

Due to shoulder inflammation during spring training, Maddox began the 2018 season on the disabled list. He was sent on rehabilitation assignments with Triple-A Pawtucket on May 18, Double-A Portland on May 30, and Pawtucket again on June 2. On July 8, he was transferred to the 60-day disabled list. On August 16, Maddox was sent on a rehabilitation assignment with the Gulf Coast League Red Sox, and on August 24 with Triple-A Pawtucket. On September 19, Maddox had surgery on his right rotator cuff with what was described as a right shoulder strain; he did not play in any MLB games during 2018. He spent the entire year on the injured list due to an injured rotator cuff. The Red Sox won 108 games in the regular season and won the World Series defeating the Los Angeles Dodgers in five games. As he was technically on the team's roster despite not playing any games for them, he was awarded a World Series ring. The ring was listed for sale at Heritage Auctions in 2022 but went unsold. After the season, the Red Sox sent Maddox outright to Pawtucket, removing him from their 40-man roster.

Maddox spent the 2019 season on the injured list with Pawtucket. Maddox was released by the Red Sox on October 25, 2019. On February 28, 2020, Maddox announced his retirement from professional baseball.

== Legal issues ==
On April 28, 2024, Maddox was taken into custody by the Jacksonville Sheriff's Office in Jacksonville, Florida as part of an undercover sting operation dubbed Operation "Valiant Knights". The operation, which took place from April 24 to April 28, targeted individuals soliciting sexual activity and/or committed to engaging in sex acts with purported minors at pre-arranged locations. Video footage of Maddox's arrest was shared by authorities on Facebook on May 20.

In September 2025, Maddox was sentenced to three years in prison and ordered to register as a sex offender after pleading guilty to two felony charges.
