= Chris Young (outfielder) =

American baseball player (born 1983)

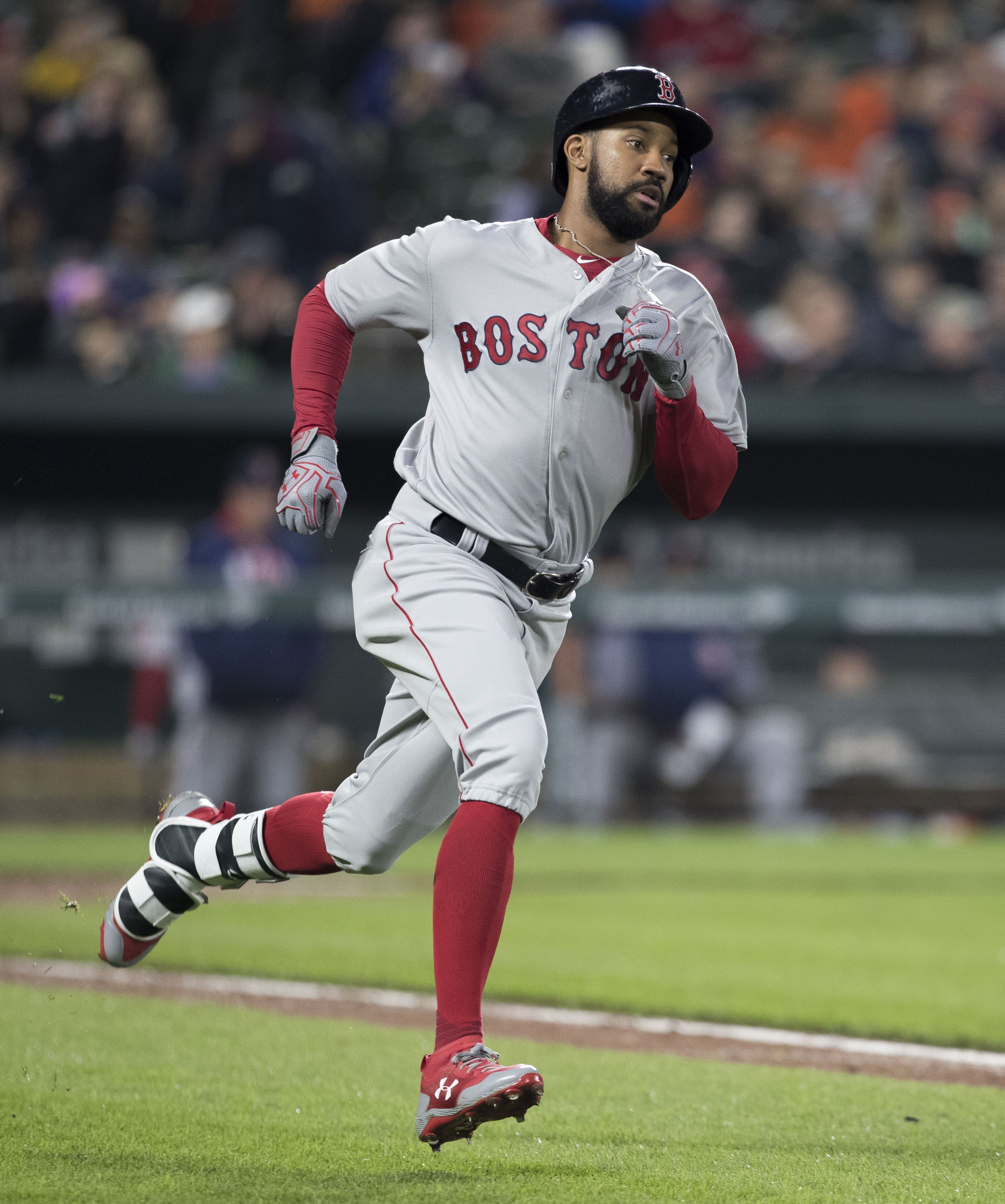
- Young with the Boston Red Sox in 2017
- Outfielder
- Born: September 5, 1983 (age 42); Houston, Texas, U.S.
- Batted: Right Threw: Right

MLB debut
- August 18, 2006, for the Arizona Diamondbacks

Last MLB appearance
- July 3, 2018, for the Los Angeles Angels

MLB statistics
- Batting average: .235
- Home runs: 191
- Runs batted in: 590
- Stats at Baseball Reference

Teams
- Arizona Diamondbacks (2006–2012); Oakland Athletics (2013); New York Mets (2014); New York Yankees (2014–2015); Boston Red Sox (2016–2017); Los Angeles Angels (2018)

Career highlights and awards
- All-Star (2010)

Christopher Brandon Young (born September 5, 1983) is an American former professional baseball outfielder. He played in Major League Baseball (MLB) for the Arizona Diamondbacks, Oakland Athletics, New York Mets, New York Yankees, Boston Red Sox, and Los Angeles Angels.

In 2007, he became the first rookie in Major League history to hit 30 home runs and steal 25 bases. While primarily a center fielder earlier in his career, Young later transitioned to a fourth outfielder role.

== Early life ==
Young was born to Carolyn and Robert Young in Houston, Texas. When Young was in high school, his father was a mechanic and his mother was a real estate agent. Young began his baseball career at St. Thomas More elementary/middle school and later attended national powerhouse Bellaire High School. In 1999, the school went 38-2 and won the Texas high school baseball championship over Duncanville High School by mercy rule. Young received All-State honors his senior year, but shattered the ulna and radius bones in his left arm in the state playoffs while attempting to catch a fly ball hit by Elkins High School's Chad Huffman.

== Professional career ==
=== Chicago White Sox ===
The Chicago White Sox selected Young in the 16th round of the 2001 MLB draft. The broken arm suffered in his senior year caused his draft stock to fall but he signed for $130,000, more typical of a fifth round draft pick. In 2003, he was an Appalachian League All-Star outfielder. In 2005, he was a Baseball America 1st team Minor League All-Star outfielder and the Chicago White Sox Minor League Player of the Year.

=== Arizona Diamondbacks ===
After the 2005 season, the White Sox traded Young to the Arizona Diamondbacks with Orlando Hernández and Luis Vizcaíno for Javier Vázquez and cash. In 2006, he was a Triple-A All-Star outfielder and Baseball America 2nd team Minor League All-Star outfielder.

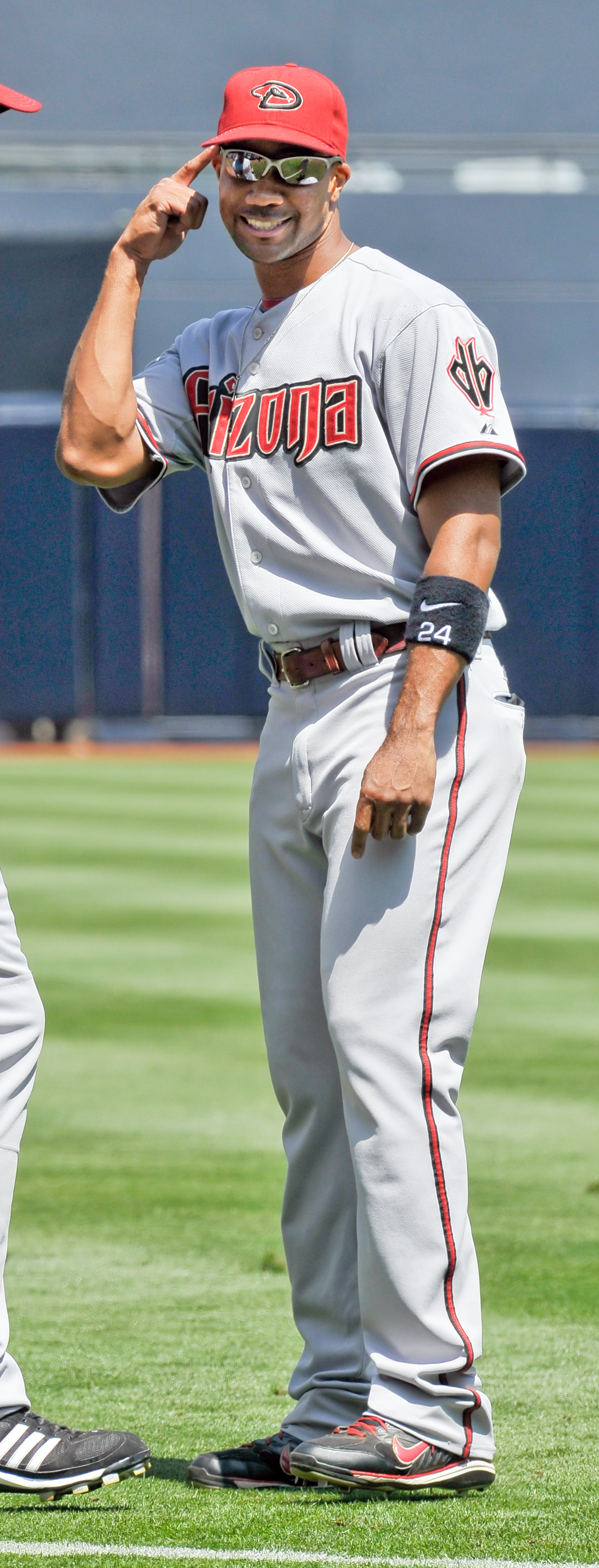
Young with the Arizona Diamondbacks in 2008

Young made his major league debut on August 18, 2006, and began the 2007 season as the Diamondbacks' everyday center fielder. On August 17, 2007, against the Atlanta Braves, he hit his 23rd home run of the year, setting a Diamondbacks rookie record. He also became the 8th rookie to hit 20 home runs and steal 20 bases.

For the season, his 27 stolen bases led all National League (NL) rookies (13th in the NL overall), and his 32 home runs were enough for 2nd among NL rookies (behind Ryan Braun, and tied for 10th overall). Among other accomplishments, Young finished 2nd among NL rookies in extra-base hits (64) and at bats (569), 3rd in runs (85) and 5th in runs batted in (68). He also hit .237 with a .295 on-base percentage, and led NL rookies by striking out 141 times. Besides, he hit nine leadoff home runs, to set an MLB rookie record.

Young was a unanimous selection for the 2007 Topps Major League Rookie All-Star Team as a result of the 49th annual Topps balloting of Major League managers. He finished fourth (10 points) in the vote for the 2007 NL Sporting News Rookie of the Year Award by 488 major league players and 30 managers, being only surpassed by Ryan Braun, Troy Tulowitzki and Hunter Pence, as well as in the 2007 Baseball America Rookie of the Year award and the Baseball Prospectus 2007 Internet Baseball NL Rookie of the Year Award competitions.

Young signed a $28 million, five-year extension with the Diamondbacks in April 2008. In 2008, Young started 157 games in center field. He finished the year with 85 runs and 85 RBIs, and led the Arizona Diamondbacks with 14 stolen bases. His batting average improved to .248, but he hit fewer home runs, ending the year with 22.

In 2009, he hit only .212, the lowest of all NL batters with at least 350 plate appearances. On August 10, 2009, he was demoted to the Diamondbacks' AAA farm club, the Reno Aces. Prospect infielder Rusty Ryal took his spot on the D'backs roster. This was Young's first demotion to the minor leagues since entering the major leagues in 2007. When called back up, he had a slight resurgence with 8 home runs for a season total of 15, including 3 solo home runs in a loss to the Rockies.

On April 11, 2010, Young contributed 4 RBIs to the Diamondbacks' franchise record 13-run inning. He also made the NL All-Star Team for the first time, as a reserve. On July 9, the night before the All-Star Game, he participated in the 2010 State Farm Home Run Derby but hit only one home run and was eliminated in the first round. At the end of the season, he tied for the NL lead in errors by an outfielder, with 7. During a game on August 7, 2010, he became the first National League player in 117 years to hit a lead-off and walk-off home run in the same game.

On August 11, 2011, he belted a 3-run homer in the bottom of the tenth against the Houston Astros to give the Diamondbacks an 8–5 win and move them a full game in front of the San Francisco Giants in the NL West. The homer came an inning after rookie slugger Paul Goldschmidt hit a game-tying bomb of his own.

=== Oakland Athletics ===
On October 20, 2012, Young was traded to the Oakland Athletics for infielder Cliff Pennington and Yordy Cabrera. In 2013 playing for Oakland he batted .200/.280/.379.

=== New York Mets ===
On November 22, 2013, the New York Mets agreed to a one-year, $7.25 million contract with Young. Young struggled with the Mets, batting .205 with eight home runs in 254 at-bats. On August 8, 2014, the Mets designated Young for assignment. He was released on August 15.

=== New York Yankees ===
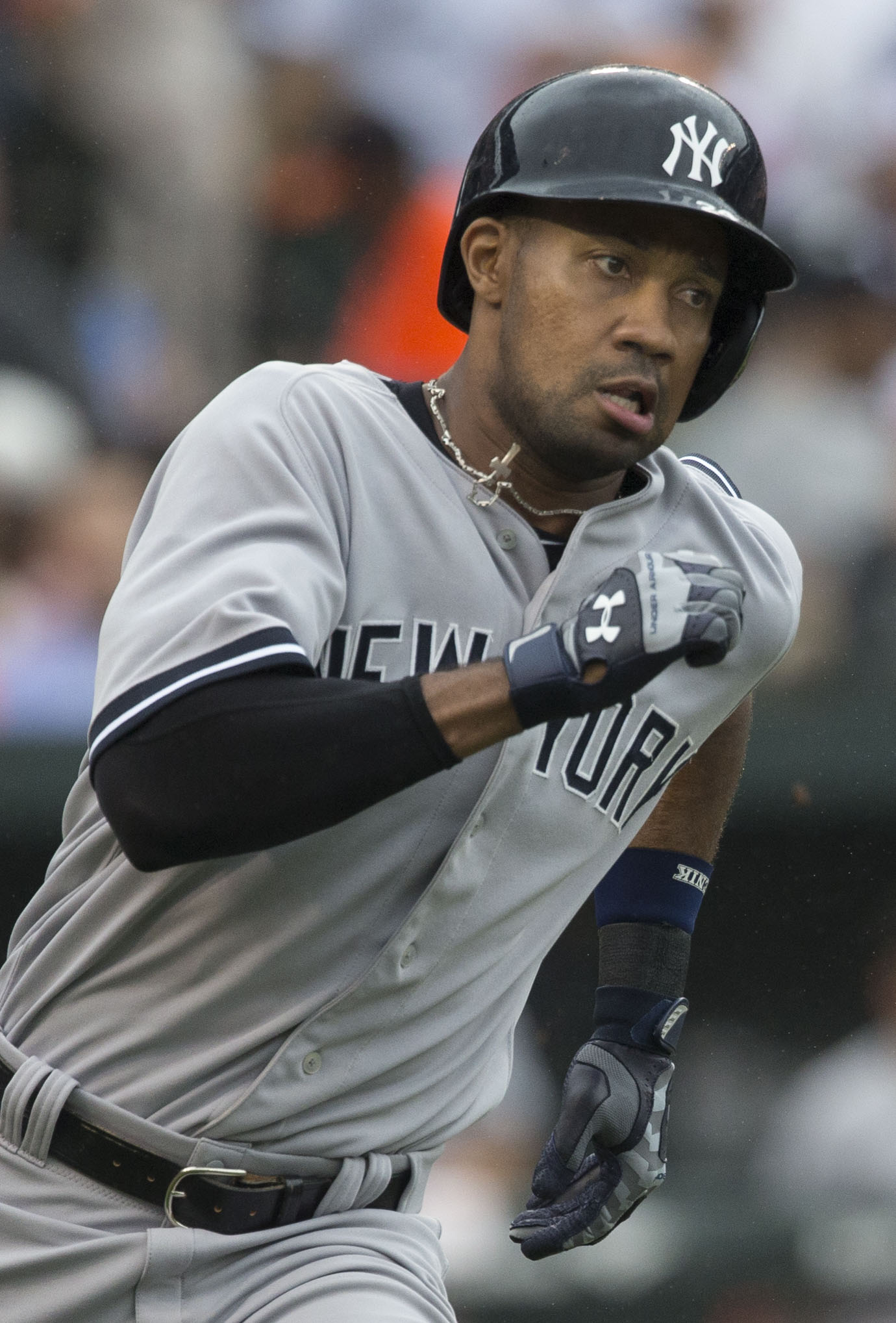
Young playing for the New York Yankees in 2014

The New York Yankees signed Young to a minor league contract on August 27, 2014. He was called up on September 2, 2014, when rosters expanded. Nine days later, on September 11, Young broke up a no-hitter in the 8th inning with a double and then hit a walk-off, three-run home run to seal the Yankees' 5–4 win over the Tampa Bay Rays. The next day, Young hit his third home run in three days, breaking a scoreless tie in the 11th inning, and (temporarily) pushing the Yankees into the lead against the Baltimore Orioles. Also on September 12, in the second game of the Orioles doubleheader, Young also made two dramatic defensive plays, twice sliding to catch fly balls in left field. In 23 games for the Yankees, Young batted .282 with three home runs.

Young signed a one-year, major league contract with the Yankees worth $2.5 million on November 8, 2014. Young batted .252 for the Yankees in 2015, playing mostly against left-handed pitchers. He started the 2015 AL Wild Card Game over Jacoby Ellsbury against left-handed pitcher Dallas Keuchel.

=== Boston Red Sox ===
On December 2, 2015, Young signed a two-year, $13 million deal with the Boston Red Sox.

The team placed Young on the 15-day disabled list on June 24, citing a strained right hamstring. Young did not return to the team until August 22. Young ended his 2016 season with a .276 batting average in 76 games.

In 2017, Young saw the field in 90 games, 14 more than the previous season; however his batting average took a large fall, as he finished the season hitting .235/.322/.387. On November 2, the Red Sox granted Young his free agent rights.

=== Los Angeles Angels ===
On February 18, 2018, Young signed a one-year, $2 million deal with the Los Angeles Angels. He was ruled out for the season on August 5 after undergoing hip surgery. He finished the season hitting a career-low .168 in 56 games. He elected free agency on October 29.

== Post-playing career ==
On May 25, 2021, Young joined MLB Network as an on-air analyst. In 2022, he graduated from Arizona State University with a degree in business administration. In 2026, Young began hosting baseball-centric episodes of the All the Smoke podcast, branded as All the Smoke Baseball, with Matt Barnes and Nick Swisher.

== Awards ==
- 2003 – Appalachian League All-Star OF
- 2005 – Baseball America 1st team Minor League All-Star OF
- 2005 – Chicago White Sox Minor League Player of the Year
- 2006 – Triple-A All-Star OF
- 2006 – Baseball America 2nd team Minor League All-Star OF
- 2007 – Diamondbacks Rookie of the Year
- 2010 – Diamondbacks MVP Award

== Personal life ==
Young's cousin, Jarrett Higgins, played college baseball at Oklahoma State University and was selected by the Colorado Rockies in the 36th round of the 2009 MLB draft. Young took classes at Houston Baptist University during his first few offseasons as a minor leaguer. After Hurricane Harvey hit his hometown of Houston in 2017, Young donated to a relief fundraiser started by Houston Texans linebacker J. J. Watt.
