= Héctor Velázquez (baseball) =

Mexican baseball player (born 1988)

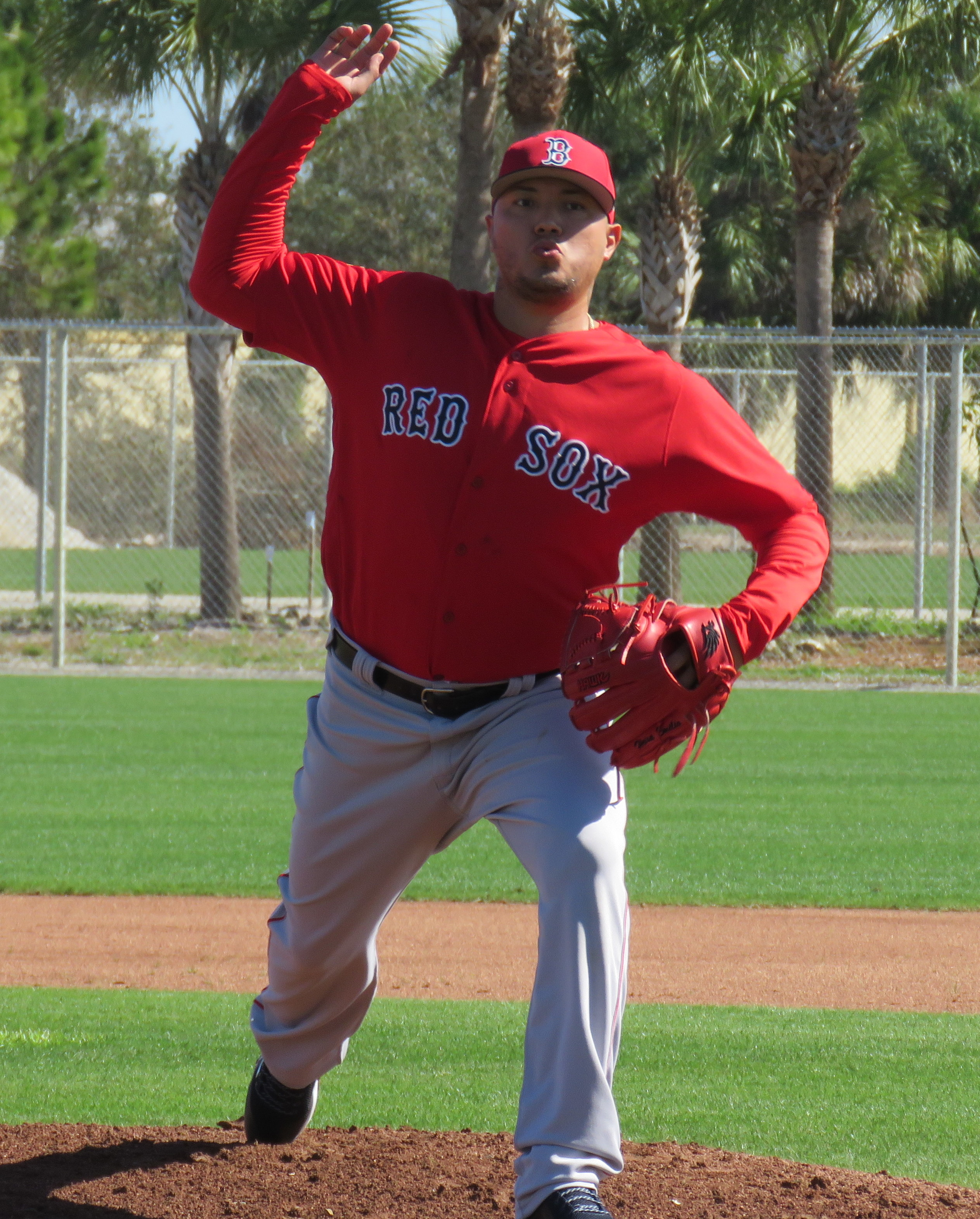
- Velázquez with the Red Sox in 2018

Olmecas de Tabasco – No. 76
- Pitcher / Coach
- Born: November 26, 1988 (age 37); Ciudad Obregón, Sonora, Mexico
- Batted: Right Threw: Right

MLB debut
- May 18, 2017, for the Boston Red Sox

Last MLB appearance
- September 27, 2019, for the Boston Red Sox

MLB statistics
- Win–loss record: 11–7
- Earned run average: 3.90
- Strikeouts: 121
- Stats at Baseball Reference

Teams
- Boston Red Sox (2017–2019)

Career highlights and awards
- Mexican League Rookie of the Year Award (2010)

Héctor Velázquez Aguilar (born November 26, 1988) is a Mexican former professional baseball pitcher who currently serves as the pitching coach for the Olmecas de Tabasco of the Mexican League. He played in Major League Baseball (MLB) for the Boston Red Sox. He threw and batted right-handed, and is listed at 6 feet 0 inches (1.83 m) and 180 pounds (82 kg).

== Playing career ==
=== Piratas de Campeche ===
On March 16, 2010, Velázquez signed with the Piratas de Campeche of the Mexican League. He made his professional debut that year, pitching in 29 games for Campeche and logging a 6–4 record and 2.93 ERA, and was named the Rookie of the Year. In 2011, Velázquez pitched in 5 games for Campeche, striking out 20 in 21 innings of work. The following year, he pitched in 19 contests for the team, posting a 11–7 record and 4.40 ERA. In 2013, Velázquez pitched to a 3–5 record and 4.19 ERA with 91 strikeouts in 124 2/3 innings pitched. For the 2014 season, Velázquez logged an 11–7 record and 4.10 ERA in 21 appearances. In 2015 with Campeche, he registered a 6–4 record and 4.44 ERA in 18 games.

=== Acereros de Monclova ===
On October 21, 2015, Velázquez was traded to the Acereros de Monclova alongside Adan Velazquez. For the 2016 season, Velázquez pitched in 22 games for Monclova, posting a 5–1 record and 2.47 ERA with 120 strikeouts in 131 1/3 innings pitched. He was returned to Campeche following the conclusion of the season.

=== Boston Red Sox ===
On February 18, 2017, the Boston Red Sox organization purchased Velázquez's contract from the Piratas. During the 2017 season, he appeared in 19 games for the Triple-A Pawtucket Red Sox, all as starting pitcher. He had an 8–4 record with 2.21 ERA and 1.000 WHIP in 102 innings pitched.

The Red Sox promoted Velázquez to the major leagues for the first time on May 18, 2017. He made his MLB debut that day, taking the loss against the Oakland Athletics after pitching five innings and giving up six runs on nine hits, while walking two and striking out four. He split time between Pawtucket and Boston through the end of the season. Overall, for the 2017 Boston Red Sox he appeared in eight games (three starts) and compiled a 3–1 record with 2.92 ERA, 1.135 WHIP, 19 strikeouts, and 7 walks in 24 2/3 innings pitched.

Velázquez won the final spot in the starting rotation of the 2018 Red Sox under rookie manager Alex Cora, exiting spring training on the 25-man roster. He made two starts in April (both wins) but otherwise served as a relief pitcher during April and May. On May 14, Velázquez was placed on the 10-day disabled list with a "low back strain." At the time, he had made ten appearances for the Red Sox (two starts) with a 5–0 record and 2.10 ERA in 25 2/3 innings pitched. He was sent on a rehabilitation assignment with Triple-A Pawtucket on May 19, and returned to the active roster on May 24. Overall for the 2018 season, Velázquez made 47 appearances (eight starts), pitching 85 innings with a record of 7–2 with a 3.18 ERA. He was not included on Boston's postseason roster.

Velázquez was included on Boston's Opening Day roster to start the 2019 season. On May 30, he was placed on the 10-day injured list with a low back strain. To that point in the season, Velázquez had a 1–3 record in 18 games (seven starts) with a 5.97 ERA. The team sent Velázquez on a rehabilitation assignment with the Lowell Spinners on June 15, and activated him on June 17. He returned to the injured list on June 19, again due to a low back sprain. He was activated from the injured list on June 29, optioned to Pawtucket on July 15, recalled to Boston on August 8, and returned to Pawtucket on August 11. Velázquez was recalled to Boston on September 1, when rosters expanded. Overall with the 2019 Red Sox, Velázquez appeared in 34 games (eight starts), compiling a 1–4 record with 5.43 ERA and 49 strikeouts in 56 1/3 innings.

On March 5, 2020, Velázquez was designated for assignment in order to make room for the newly signed Collin McHugh on the 40-man roster.

=== Houston Astros ===
On March 8, 2020, the Baltimore Orioles claimed Velázquez off of waivers. He was outrighted off of the 40-man roster on July 24. On July 29, Velázquez was traded to the Houston Astros in exchange for Miguel Padilla. He would not play in a game in 2020 due to the cancellation of the minor league season because of the COVID-19 pandemic. Velázquez was assigned to the Triple-A Sugar Land Skeeters to begin the 2021 season. After recording a 1.46 ERA in 14 games with Sugar Land, Velázquez was released by Houston on July 14, 2021.

=== Acereros de Monclova (second stint) ===
On July 14, 2021, Velázquez signed a contract to return to the Acereros de Monclova of the Mexican League, with whom he played for in 2016.

=== Leones de Yucatán ===
On April 19, 2023, Vélazquez's rights were acquired by the Leones de Yucatán of the Mexican League. In 10 games (9 starts) for Yucatán, he recorded a 5.72 ERA with 21 strikeouts across 28 1/3 innings pitched. Velázquez was released by the Leones on April 1, 2024.

=== El Águila de Veracruz ===
On April 9, 2024, Velázquez signed with El Águila de Veracruz of the Mexican League. In five appearances, he posted a 1–0 record with a 2.70 ERA and 3 strikeouts over 6 2/3 innings. Velázquez was released on May 24.

== Coaching career ==
On October 11, 2024, Velázquez was hired as the pitching coach for the Rieleros de Aguascalientes of the Mexican League.

On June 17, 2025, Velázquez was hired to serve as the bullpen coach for the Olmecas de Tabasco of the Mexican League.

== International career ==
Velázquez has played in the Mexican Pacific League since 2010, and represented Mexico at the 2017 and 2021 editions of the Caribbean Series.

On October 29, 2018, Velázquez was selected to play in the 2018 MLB Japan All-Star Series.

Velázquez was on the Mexico national baseball team roster for the 2020 Summer Olympics (contested in July 2021), but a positive COVID-19 result disqualified him.

== Personal ==
Velázquez and his wife, Isa, have two sons together.
