= Brewbaker Technology Magnet High School =

American High school

Coordinates: 32°19′11″N 86°13′10″W

Location
- 4405 Brewbaker Drive; Montgomery, Alabama 36116; United States

Information
- School type: Magnet School
- Established: 2000 (26 years ago)
- School district: Montgomery County School District
- CEEB code: 011877
- Principal: Jason Norred
- Teaching staff: 35.00 (FTE)
- Grades: 9-12
- Enrollment: 573 (2023-2024)
- Student to teacher ratio: 16.37
- Colors: Gray and black
- Mascot: Ram
- Accreditation: Blue Ribbon 2009
- Website: www.mps.k12.al.us/o/brewbakertmhs

Brewbaker Technology Magnet High School, colloquially known as BrewTech, is an American high school that received the Blue Ribbon Schools Program in 2009. Brewbaker serves students in grades 9 through 12.

== History ==
Brewbaker Technology Magnet High School opened in August 2000 as a product of a partnership between Montgomery County Public Schools, the Montgomery City Council, and the Montgomery Area Chamber of Commerce with funding from a series of federal and local grants. The school was also ranked #8 in Alabama as a top high school and #108 in the nation for the 2011-2012 school year.

== School structure ==
BrewTech employs a faculty and staff that includes thirty-three classroom teachers, one counselor, one media specialist, technology coordinator, and two administrators.

- Class Size Average: 23 students. Some core classes may have up to 30 students.
- Enrollment: 780 Students
- Graduation Rate: 100 percent.

== Extracurricular activities ==
Brewtech also constantly wins Vex Robotics competitions and has many robots qualifying for state and worlds competitions each year.

=== Sports ===
BrewTech's athletic programs include basketball, baseball, softball, golf, tennis, soccer, volleyball, track & field, cross country, wrestling, flag football and cheer teams.

- In Spring 2011, the Varsity Girls Basketball team won the 4A AHSAA State Championship in the Birmingham-Jefferson Convention Complex Arena.

== Awards and recognition ==
Scholarships Awarded: Over $1.6 million awarded to the 2008 graduating class.

== Notable alumni ==
- KT Harrell, college basketball coach and former player
- Ben Taylor, baseball player
