= Kyle Martin (pitcher) =

American baseball player (born 1991)

- Relief pitcher
- Born: January 18, 1991 (age 35); Austin, Texas, U.S.
- Batted: Right Threw: Right

Professional debut
- MLB: July 20, 2017, for the Boston Red Sox
- NPB: August 11, 2018, for the Saitama Seibu Lions

Last appearance
- MLB: July 20, 2017, for the Boston Red Sox
- NPB: August 17, 2019, for the Saitama Seibu Lions

MLB statistics
- Win–loss record: 0–0
- Earned run average: 3.86
- Strikeouts: 1

NPB statistics
- Win–loss record: 4–6
- Earned run average: 3.13
- Strikeouts: 62
- Stats at Baseball Reference

Teams
- Boston Red Sox (2017); Saitama Seibu Lions (2018–2019)

Kyle Jared Martin (born January 18, 1991) is an American former professional baseball pitcher. He played in Major League Baseball (MLB) for the Boston Red Sox, and in Nippon Professional Baseball (NPB) for the Saitama Seibu Lions. Listed at 6' 7", 230 lb., he bats and throw right-handed.

== Career ==
=== Boston Red Sox ===
Martin signed after being selected by the Red Sox in the ninth round of the 2013 MLB draft out of Texas A&M University. He previously had been selected by the Chicago White Sox (2012) and Washington Nationals (2009) but chose not to sign. Martin was scouted with a three-pitch repertoire that included a 92–94 mph fastball with above-average control, complemented with an 83-86 mph slider, and a 79–82 mph circle changeup that he has the confidence to throw in any count.

In a span of two seasons (2013 and 2014) with three teams, Martin was the first pitcher in the Red Sox 2013 draft class to reach the Double-A level. In his three stints, he posted a collective 8–7 record with a 3.16 ERA and 13 saves in 54 relief appearances, striking out 112 batters while walking 26 in 116 2/3 innings of work before joining the Portland Sea Dogs. Martin suffered setbacks and struggled through injuries in the 2015 midseason, spending two months on the disabled list. He recovered late in the year and was assigned to the Arizona Fall League, where his fastball touched 96 miles per hour (154 km/h), with some arm-side run, and garnered a promotion to Triple-A Pawtucket Red Sox in 2016.

In 2016, Martin posted a 3–4 record with a 3.38 ERA and six saves while striking out 78 hitters and walking 21, to compile a 3.71 SO/W in 66 2/3 innings. He also recorded a WHIP of 1.19 and was second among International League relievers with 10.53 strikeouts per nine innings. After the 2016 season, Martin was rated as the Red Sox's No. 22 prospect, according to MLB.com, and the Red Sox added him to their 40-man roster. Martin made his Major League debut on July 20, 2017. He was designated for assignment on September 5, 2017, removing him from the 40-man roster. Martin was released on July 25, 2018, to pursue an opportunity to play in Japan.

=== Saitama Seibu Lions ===
On July 26, 2018, it was announced that Martin had signed with the Saitama Seibu Lions of the Nippon Professional Baseball (NPB). In 22 appearances for Seibu, he posted a 2-1 record and 2.08 ERA with 26 strikeouts and one save across 21 2/3 innings pitched.

Martin made 41 appearances for the Lions in 2019, compiling a 2-5 record and 3.67 ERA with 36 strikeouts and one save across 41 2/3 innings pitched. On October 30, 2019, Martin was placed on waivers by the Lions. On November 5, he cleared waivers and became a free agent.

=== Sugar Land Skeeters ===
On March 5, 2020, Martin signed with the Sugar Land Skeeters of the Atlantic League of Professional Baseball. He made three appearances for Sugar Land, but struggled to a 16.88 ERA with five strikeouts across 2 2/3 innings of relief. Martin became a free agent after the season.
