= Ben Taylor (pitcher, born 1992) =

American baseball player

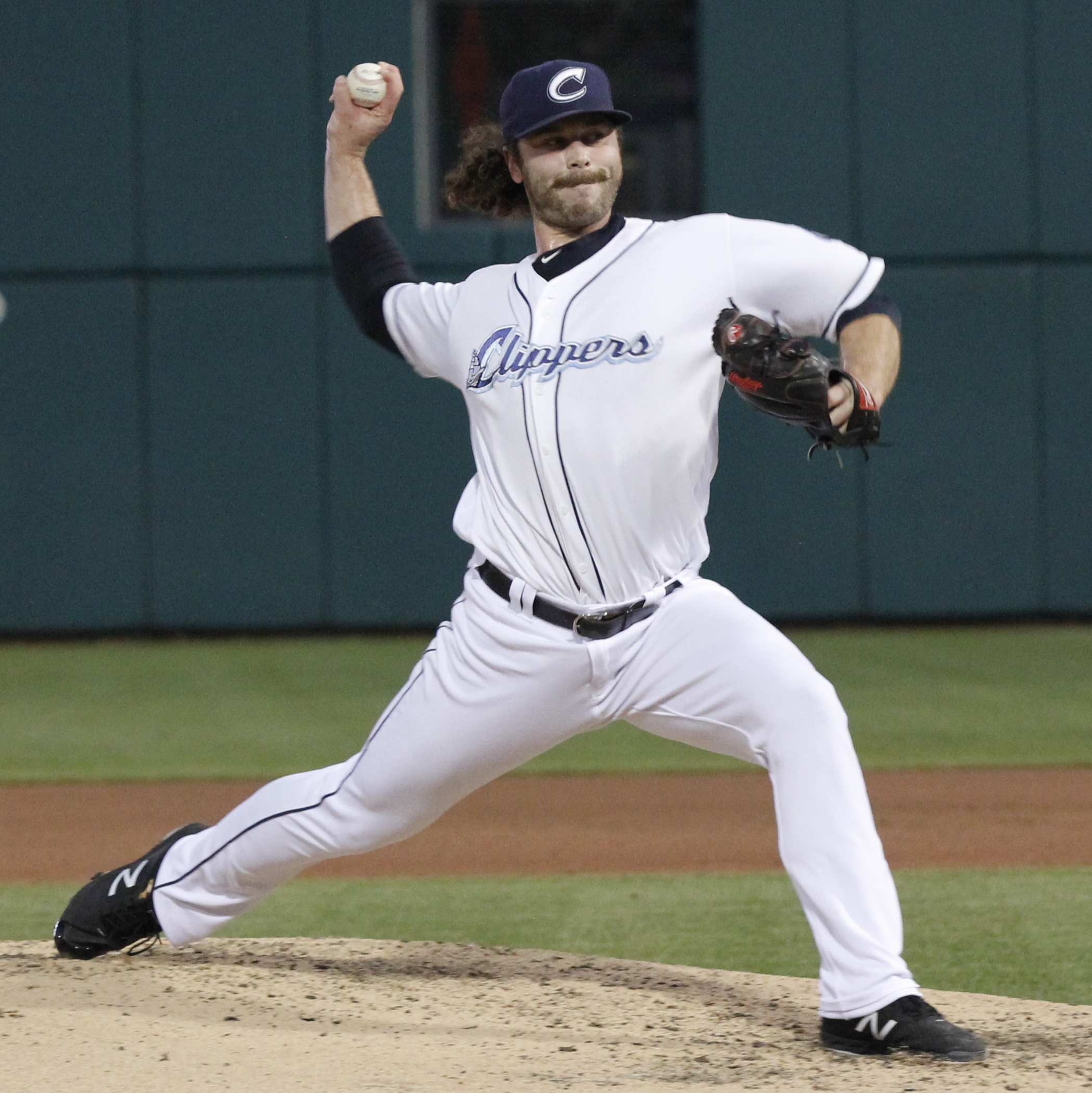
- Taylor with the Columbus Clippers in 2018
- Pitcher
- Born: November 12, 1992 (age 33); Montgomery, Alabama, U.S.
- Batted: Right Threw: Right

MLB debut
- April 7, 2017, for the Boston Red Sox

Last MLB appearance
- May 30, 2018, for the Cleveland Indians

MLB statistics
- Win–loss record: 0–1
- Earned run average: 5.40
- Strikeouts: 26
- Stats at Baseball Reference

Teams
- Boston Red Sox (2017); Cleveland Indians (2018)

Benjamin Alan Taylor (born November 12, 1992) is an American former professional baseball pitcher. He played in Major League Baseball (MLB) for the Boston Red Sox and the Cleveland Indians.

== Playing career ==
=== Boston Red Sox ===
Taylor attended Brewbaker Technology Magnet High School in Montgomery, Alabama, graduating in 2011. He attended Chattahoochee Valley Community College for two years, and the University of South Alabama for the final two years of his college baseball career. The Boston Red Sox selected Taylor in the seventh round of the 2015 Major League Baseball draft. He signed and made his professional debut with the Lowell Spinners of the Low–A, and after compiling a 1.80 ERA in ten relief innings, he was promoted to the Greenville Drive of the Single–A South Atlantic League in July where he was 0–2 with a 3.40 ERA in ten starts. In 2016, Taylor pitched for the Salem Red Sox of the High–A Carolina League and the Portland Sea Dogs of the Double–A Eastern League, going a combined 1–2 with a 2.96 ERA in 36 games (three starts).

Taylor was on the Red Sox' Opening Day 25-man roster for the 2017 season. He was optioned to the Pawtucket Red Sox of the Triple–A International League on April 13, and he spent the remainder of the season between Pawtucket and Boston. In 12 games for Pawtucket he posted a 2.70 ERA, and in 14 games for Boston, he was 0–1 with a 5.19 ERA.

On May 17, 2017, Taylor recorded his first MLB save during a 5-4 extra inning win over the Cardinals.

Taylor was designated for assignment on February 18, 2018.

=== Cleveland Indians ===
On February 25, 2018, Taylor was claimed off waivers by the Cleveland Indians. He was designated for assignment on March 29, 2018. After clearing waivers, Taylor was outrighted to the Columbus Clippers on April 2, 2018.

The Indians purchased Taylor's contract and added him to their active roster on May 2, 2018.

The Indians designated Taylor for assignment on March 28, 2019, following the selection of Hanley Ramirez’s contract. Taylor was released on April 2.

=== Arizona Diamondbacks ===
On April 11, 2019, Taylor signed a minor league contract with the Arizona Diamondbacks organization. In 46 relief outings for the Triple–A Reno Aces, he posted a 5.63 ERA with 70 strikeouts and 4 saves across 56 innings of work. Taylor elected free agency following the season on November 4.

=== Chicago Cubs ===
On December 14, 2019, Taylor signed a minor league deal with the Chicago Cubs and was invited to major league Spring Training. Taylor was released by the Cubs organization on May 28, 2020.

=== Detroit Tigers ===
On February 19, 2021, Taylor signed a minor league contract with the Detroit Tigers organization. On March 30, Taylor was released by the Tigers after suffering a season–ending Achilles tendon rupture.

== Post-playing career ==
In July 2023, Taylor joined the Boston Red Sox organization as an assistant strength and conditioning coach.
