= 2017 Cincinnati Reds season =

2017 Cincinnati Reds
- League: National League
- Division: Central
- Ballpark: Great American Ball Park
- City: Cincinnati, Ohio
- Record: 68–94 (.420)
- Divisional place: 5th
- Owners: Bob Castellini
- General managers: Dick Williams
- Managers: Bryan Price
- Television: Fox Sports Ohio (Thom Brennaman, Chris Welsh, Jim Kelch, George Grande, Jeff Brantley, Jim Day, Jeff Piecoro)
- Radio: WLW (700 AM); Reds Radio Network (Marty Brennaman, Jeff Brantley, Jim Kelch, Thom Brennaman, Doug Flynn, Chris Welsh)
- Stats: ESPN.com; Baseball Reference

The 2017 Cincinnati Reds season was the 148th season for the franchise in Major League Baseball, and their 15th at Great American Ball Park in Cincinnati. The Reds opened the season with a game against the Philadelphia Phillies on April 3 at the Great American Ball Park and finished the season on October 1 against the Chicago Cubs at Wrigley Field. The Reds were eliminated from postseason playoff consideration on September 14, 2017. They equaled their record from the previous season and finished last in the National League Central for the third straight year and missed the playoffs for the fourth straight year.

== Offseason ==
On November 28, Reds claimed outfielder Gabby Guerrero from the Arizona Diamondbacks and catcher Juan Graterol from the Los Angeles Angels off waivers. Keyvius Sampson and Ramon Cabrera were designated for assignment to make room on the 40 man roster. The latter two were later non-tendered, along with Guerrero, though he was later re-signed to a minor league deal.

== Standings ==
=== National League Central ===
NL Central
| Team | W | L | Pct. | GB | Home | Road |
|---|---|---|---|---|---|---|
| Chicago Cubs | 92 | 70 | .568 | — | 48‍–‍33 | 44‍–‍37 |
| Milwaukee Brewers | 86 | 76 | .531 | 6 | 46‍–‍38 | 40‍–‍38 |
| St. Louis Cardinals | 83 | 79 | .512 | 9 | 44‍–‍37 | 39‍–‍42 |
| Pittsburgh Pirates | 75 | 87 | .463 | 17 | 44‍–‍37 | 31‍–‍50 |
| Cincinnati Reds | 68 | 94 | .420 | 24 | 39‍–‍42 | 29‍–‍52 |

=== National League Wildcard ===
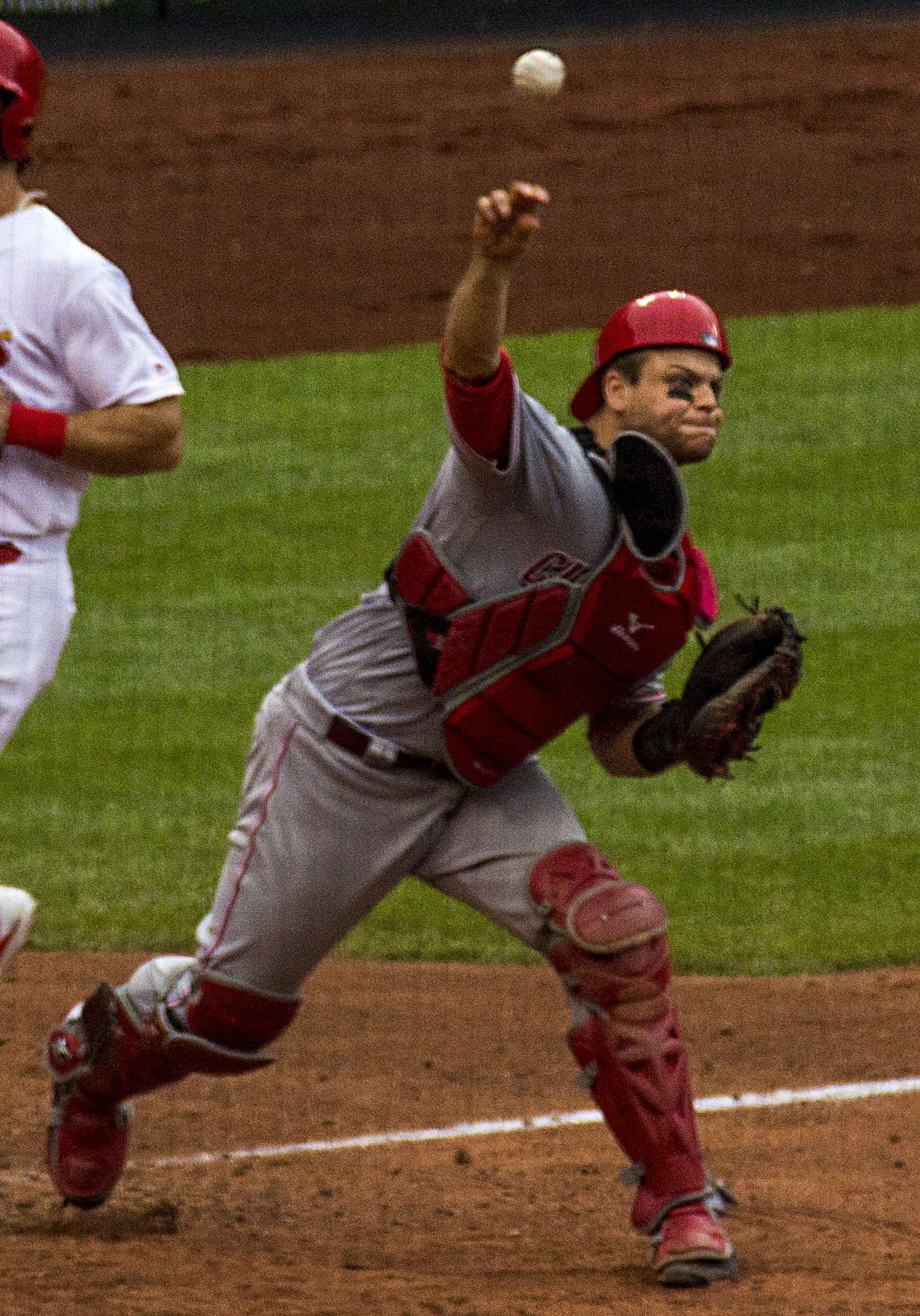
Devin Mesoraco throws out a runner during a bunt play, in St.Louis.

Division leaders
| Team | W | L | Pct. |
|---|---|---|---|
| Los Angeles Dodgers | 104 | 58 | .642 |
| Washington Nationals | 97 | 65 | .599 |
| Chicago Cubs | 92 | 70 | .568 |

Wild Card teams (Top 2 teams qualify for postseason)
| Team | W | L | Pct. | GB |
|---|---|---|---|---|
| Arizona Diamondbacks | 93 | 69 | .574 | +6 |
| Colorado Rockies | 87 | 75 | .537 | — |
| Milwaukee Brewers | 86 | 76 | .531 | 1 |
| St. Louis Cardinals | 83 | 79 | .512 | 4 |
| Miami Marlins | 77 | 85 | .475 | 10 |
| Pittsburgh Pirates | 75 | 87 | .463 | 12 |
| Atlanta Braves | 72 | 90 | .444 | 15 |
| San Diego Padres | 71 | 91 | .438 | 16 |
| New York Mets | 70 | 92 | .432 | 17 |
| Cincinnati Reds | 68 | 94 | .420 | 19 |
| Philadelphia Phillies | 66 | 96 | .407 | 21 |
| San Francisco Giants | 64 | 98 | .395 | 23 |

=== Record vs. opponents ===
2017 National League record Source: MLB Standings Grid – 2017
| Team | AZ | ATL | CHC | CIN | COL | LAD | MIA | MIL | NYM | PHI | PIT | SD | SF | STL | WSH | AL |
|---|---|---|---|---|---|---|---|---|---|---|---|---|---|---|---|---|
| Arizona | — | 2–4 | 3–3 | 3–3 | 11–8 | 11–8 | 3–4 | 4–3 | 6–1 | 6–1 | 4–3 | 11–8 | 12–7 | 3–4 | 2–4 | 12–8 |
| Atlanta | 4–2 | — | 1–6 | 3–3 | 3–4 | 3–4 | 11–8 | 4–2 | 7–12 | 6–13 | 2–5 | 5–2 | 4–3 | 1–5 | 9–10 | 9–11 |
| Chicago | 3–3 | 6–1 | — | 12–7 | 2–5 | 2–4 | 4–3 | 10–9 | 4–2 | 4–3 | 10–9 | 2–4 | 4–3 | 14–5 | 3–4 | 12–8 |
| Cincinnati | 3–3 | 3–3 | 7–12 | — | 3–4 | 0–6 | 2–5 | 8–11 | 3–4 | 4–2 | 13–6 | 3–4 | 4–3 | 9–10 | 1–6 | 5–15 |
| Colorado | 8–11 | 4–3 | 5–2 | 4–3 | — | 10–9 | 2–4 | 4–3 | 3–3 | 5–2 | 3–3 | 12–7 | 12–7 | 2–4 | 3–4 | 10–10 |
| Los Angeles | 8–11 | 4–3 | 4–2 | 6–0 | 9–10 | — | 6–1 | 3–3 | 7–0 | 4–3 | 6–1 | 13–6 | 11–8 | 4–3 | 3–3 | 16–4 |
| Miami | 4–3 | 8–11 | 3–4 | 5–2 | 4–2 | 1–6 | — | 2–4 | 12–7 | 8–11 | 3–4 | 5–1 | 5–1 | 2–5 | 6–13 | 9–11 |
| Milwaukee | 3–4 | 2–4 | 9–10 | 11–8 | 3–4 | 3–3 | 4–2 | — | 5–2 | 3–3 | 9–10 | 5–2 | 3–4 | 11–8 | 4–3 | 11–9 |
| New York | 1–6 | 12–7 | 2–4 | 4–3 | 3–3 | 0–7 | 7–12 | 2–5 | — | 12–7 | 3–3 | 3–4 | 5–1 | 3–4 | 6–13 | 7–13 |
| Philadelphia | 1–6 | 13–6 | 3–4 | 2–4 | 2–5 | 3–4 | 11–8 | 3–3 | 7–12 | — | 2–5 | 1–5 | 4–3 | 1–5 | 8–11 | 5–15 |
| Pittsburgh | 3–4 | 5–2 | 9–10 | 6–13 | 3–3 | 1–6 | 4–3 | 10–9 | 3–3 | 5–2 | — | 3–3 | 1–5 | 8–11 | 4–3 | 10–10 |
| San Diego | 8–11 | 2–5 | 4–2 | 4–3 | 7–12 | 6–13 | 1–5 | 2–5 | 4–3 | 5–1 | 3–3 | — | 12–7 | 3–4 | 2–5 | 8–12 |
| San Francisco | 7–12 | 3–4 | 3–4 | 3–4 | 7–12 | 8–11 | 1–5 | 4–3 | 1–5 | 3–4 | 5–1 | 7–12 | — | 3–4 | 1–5 | 8–12 |
| St. Louis | 4–3 | 5–1 | 5–14 | 10–9 | 4–2 | 3–4 | 5–2 | 8–11 | 4–3 | 5–1 | 11–8 | 4–3 | 4–3 | — | 3–3 | 8–12 |
| Washington | 4–2 | 10–9 | 4–3 | 6–1 | 4–3 | 3–3 | 13–6 | 3–4 | 13–6 | 11–8 | 3–4 | 5–2 | 5–1 | 3–3 | — | 10–10 |

=== Detailed record ===
National League
| Opponent | Home | Away | Total | Pct. |
NL East
| Atlanta Braves | 1–2 | 2–1 | 3–3 | .500 |
| Miami Marlins | 1–2 | 1–3 | 2–5 | .286 |
| New York Mets | 2–1 | 1–3 | 3–4 | .429 |
| Philadelphia Phillies | 2–1 | 2–1 | 4–2 | .667 |
| Washington Nationals | 0–4 | 1–2 | 1–6 | .143 |
| | 6–10 | 7–10 | 13–20 | .394 |
NL Central
| Chicago Cubs | 4–5 | 3–7 | 7–12 | .368 |
| Milwaukee Brewers | 6–4 | 2–7 | 8–11 | .421 |
| Pittsburgh Pirates | 7–3 | 6–3 | 13–6 | .684 |
| St. Louis Cardinals | 5–5 | 4–5 | 9–10 | .474 |
| | 22–17 | 15–22 | 37–39 | .487 |
NL West
| Arizona Diamondbacks | 1–2 | 2–1 | 3–3 | .500 |
| Colorado Rockies | 1–2 | 2–2 | 3–4 | .429 |
| Los Angeles Dodgers | 0–3 | 0–3 | 0–6 | .000 |
| San Diego Padres | 3–1 | 0–3 | 3–4 | .429 |
| San Francisco Giants | 3–0 | 1–3 | 4–3 | .571 |
| | 8–8 | 5–12 | 13–20 | .394 |

American League
| Opponent | Home | Away | Total | Pct. |
| Baltimore Orioles | 1–2 | N/A | 1–2 | .333 |
| Boston Red Sox | 0–3 | N/A | 0–3 | .000 |
| Cleveland Indians | 1–1 | 1–1 | 2–2 | .500 |
| New York Yankees | 1–1 | 0–2 | 1–3 | .250 |
| Tampa Bay Rays | N/A | 1–2 | 1–2 | .333 |
| Toronto Blue Jays | N/A | 0–3 | 0–3 | .000 |
| | 3–7 | 2–8 | 5–15 | .250 |

| Month | Games | Won | Lost | Win % |
|---|---|---|---|---|
| April | 24 | 11 | 13 | .458 |
| May | 28 | 13 | 15 | .464 |
| June | 27 | 10 | 17 | .370 |
| July | 26 | 8 | 18 | .308 |
| August | 29 | 15 | 14 | .517 |
| September | 27 | 10 | 17 | .370 |
| October | 1 | 1 | 0 | 1.000 |
| Total | 162 | 68 | 94 | .420 |

| | Games | Won | Lost | Win % |
|---|---|---|---|---|
| Home | 81 | 39 | 42 | .481 |
| Away | 81 | 29 | 52 | .358 |
| Total | 162 | 68 | 94 | .420 |

- Most Runs Scored in a game: 14 (5/6 vs SF)
- Most Runs Allowed in a game: 18 (6/24 at WAS)
- Longest Winning Streak: 5 (5/3-5/7)
- Longest Losing Streak: 9 (6/9-6/19)

== Regular Season Highlights ==
Opening Day Starting Lineup

| Position | Name |
|---|---|
| CF | Billy Hamilton |
| 2B | José Peraza |
| 1B | Joey Votto |
| LF | Adam Duvall |
| 3B | Eugenio Suárez |
| RF | Scott Schebler |
| SS | Zack Cozart |
| C | Tucker Barnhart |
| P | Scott Feldman |

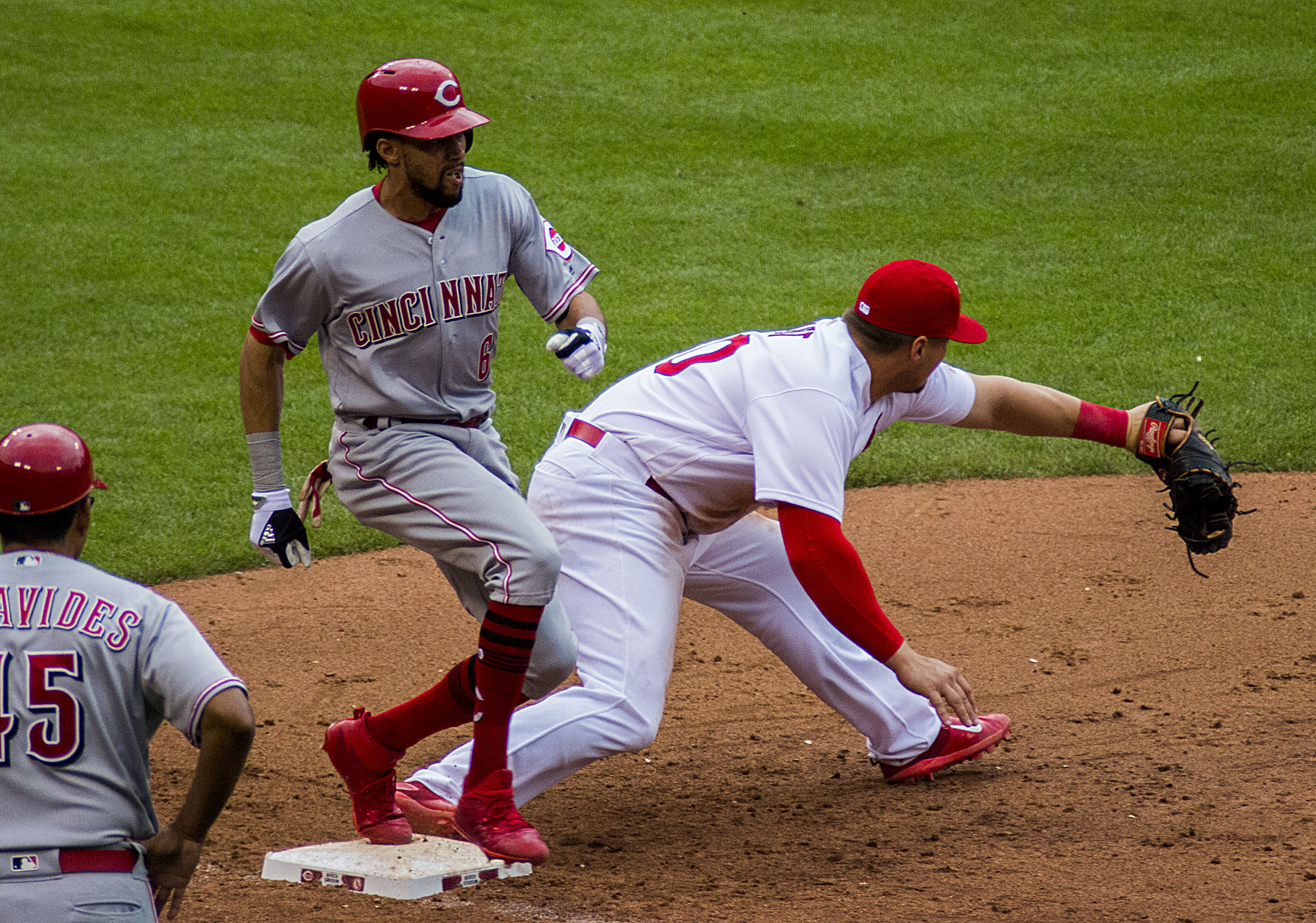
Billy Hamilton reaches on an infield hit, June 26, 2017.

- May 5–6: The Reds scored a combined 27 runs in two back-to-back games against the San Francisco Giants at Great American Ball Park. This tied the record for most runs for the Reds in two games (occurred previously in 1976).
- June 2: Brandon Phillips returns to Great American Ball Park to a standing ovation during his first at-bat since being traded to the Braves. Catcher Devin Mesoraco hits a walk-off solo homerun to left field in the 10th inning, leading to a 3–2 Reds victory.
- June 6: Scooter Gennett became the 17th player in MLB history to hit 4 HR in a single game. His 4 HR were a single-game franchise record and he tied the team record with 10 RBIs.
- September 4: Reds outfielder Billy Hamilton hit his first ever game winning walk-off home run against the Milwaukee Brewers. The Reds won 5-4.

== Game log ==
2017 regular season game log: 68–94 (Home: 39–42; Away: 29–52)
April: 11–13 (Home: 5–8; Away: 6–5)

| # | Date | Opponent | Score | Win | Loss | Save | Attendance | Record | Box | Streak |
|---|---|---|---|---|---|---|---|---|---|---|
| 1 | April 3 | Phillies | 3–4 | Hellickson (1–0) | **Feldman** (0–1) | Gómez (1) | 43,804 | 0–1 | | L1 |
| 2 | April 5 | Phillies | 2–0 | **Finnegan** (1–0) | Eickhoff (0–1) | **Iglesias** (1) | 19,944 | 1–1 | | W1 |
| 3 | April 6 | Phillies | 7–4 | **Reed** (1–0) | Morgan (0–1) | **Storen** (1) | 10,586 | 2–1 | | W2 |
| 4 | April 7 | @ Cardinals | 2–0 | **Garrett** (1–0) | Leake (0–1) | **Iglesias** (2) | 44,653 | 3–1 | | W3 |
| 5 | April 8 | @ Cardinals | 4–10 | Wacha (1–0) | **Arroyo** (0–1) | — | 46,588 | 3–2 | | L1 |
| 6 | April 9 | @ Cardinals | 8–0 | **Feldman** (1–1) | Martinez (0–1) | — | 45,200 | 4–2 | | W1 |
| 7 | April 10 | @ Pirates | 7–1 | **Lorenzen** (1–0) | Glasnow (0–1) | — | 28,264 | 5–2 | | W2 |
| 8 | April 11 | @ Pirates | 6–2 | **Storen** (1–0) | Nicasio (0–1) | **Iglesias** (3) | 11,027 | 6–2 | | W3 |
| 9 | April 12 | @ Pirates | 9–2 | **Garrett** (2–0) | Nova (1–1) | — | 12,327 | 7–2 | | W4 |
| 10 | April 13 | Brewers | 1–5 | Nelson (1–0) | **Arroyo** (0–2) | — | 13,574 | 7–3 | | L1 |
| 11 | April 14 | Brewers | 4–10 | Milone (1–0) | **Wood** (0–1) | — | 23,850 | 7–4 | | L2 |
| 12 | April 15 | Brewers | 7–5 | **Iglesias** (1–0) | Torres (0–1) | **Lorenzen** (1) | 31,008 | 8–4 | | W1 |
| 13 | April 16 | Brewers | 2–4 | Peralta (3–0) | **Romano** (0–1) | Feliz (4) | 12,625 | 8–5 | | L1 |
| 14 | April 18 | Orioles | 9–3 | **Arroyo** (1–2) | Gausman (1–1) | — | 16,018 | 9–5 | | W1 |
| 15 | April 19 | Orioles | 0–2 | Jiménez (1–0) | **Garrett** (2–1) | Brach (1) | 15,083 | 9–6 | | L1 |
| 16 | April 20 | Orioles | 1–2 (10) | O'Day (1–1) | **Wood** (0–1) | Brach (2) | 11,910 | 9–7 | | L2 |
| 17 | April 21 | Cubs | 5–6 (11) | Edwards Jr. (1–1) | **Stephenson** (0–1) | Davis (4) | 29,350 | 9–8 | | L3 |
| 18 | April 22 | Cubs | 8–12 | Arrieta (3–0) | **Reed** (1–1) | — | 27,189 | 9–9 | | L4 |
| 19 | April 23 | Cubs | 7–5 | **Arroyo** (2–2) | Lackey (1–3) | — | 32,670 | 10–9 | | W1 |
| 20 | April 24 | @ Brewers | 7–11 | Torres (1–2) | **Garrett** (2–2) | — | 23,943 | 10–10 | | L1 |
| 21 | April 25 | @ Brewers | 1–9 | Davies (2–2) | **Feldman** (1–2) | Milone (1) | 28,449 | 10–11 | | L2 |
| 22 | April 26 | @ Brewers | 4–9 | Peralta (4–1) | **Davis** (0–1) | — | 19,062 | 10–12 | | L3 |
| 23 | April 28 | @ Cardinals | 5–7 | Lynn (3–1) | **Adleman** (0–1) | Oh (6) | 42,722 | 10–13 | | L4 |
| — | April 29 | @ Cardinals | **Postponed (rain)** (Makeup date: June 26) | | | | | | | |
| 24 | April 30 | @ Cardinals | 5–4 | **Peralta** (1–0) | Rosenthal (0–1) | **Iglesias** (4) | 45,682 | 11–13 | | W1 |

May: 13–15 (Home: 9–5; Away: 4–10)

| # | Date | Opponent | Score | Win | Loss | Save | Attendance | Record | Box | Streak |
|---|---|---|---|---|---|---|---|---|---|---|
| 25 | May 1 | Pirates | 4–3 | **Lorenzen** (2–0) | Hudson (0–1) | — | 14,753 | 12–13 | | W2 |
| 26 | May 2 | Pirates | 3–12 | Glasnow (1–1) | **Feldman** (1–3) | LeBlanc (1) | 13,909 | 12–14 | | L1 |
| 27 | May 3 | Pirates | 7–2 | **Davis** (1–1) | Taillon (2–1) | — | 14,297 | 13–14 | | W1 |
| 28 | May 4 | Pirates | 4–2 | **Adleman** (1–1) | Nova (3–3) | **Iglesias** (5) | 17,896 | 14–14 | | W2 |
| 29 | May 5 | Giants | 13–3 | **Arroyo** (3–2) | Cain (3–3) | — | 22,724 | 15–14 | | W3 |
| 30 | May 6 | Giants | 14–2 | **Garrett** (3–2) | Blach (3–3) | **Stephenson** (1) | 20,213 | 16–14 | | W4 |
| 31 | May 7 | Giants | 4–0 | **Feldman** (2–3) | Cueto (4–2) | — | 21,142 | 17–14 | | W5 |
| 32 | May 8 | Yankees | 4–10 | Tanaka (5–1) | **Davis** (1–2) | — | 25,960 | 17–15 | | L1 |
| 33 | May 9 | Yankees | 5–3 | **Adleman** (2–1) | Sabathia (2–2) | **Iglesias** (6) | 22,035 | 18–15 | | W1 |
| 34 | May 11 | @ Giants | 3–2 | **Peralta** (2–0) | Strickland (0–1) | **Iglesias** (7) | 41,493 | 19–15 | | W2 |
| 35 | May 12 | @ Giants | 2–3 (17) | Gearrin (1–1) | **Stephenson** (0–2) | — | 41,325 | 19–16 | | L1 |
| 36 | May 13 | @ Giants | 1–3 | Moore (2–4) | **Bonilla** (0–1) | Law (3) | 41,269 | 19–17 | | L2 |
| 37 | May 14 | @ Giants | 3–8 | Samardzija (1–5) | **Adleman** (2–2) | — | 42,122 | 19–18 | | L3 |
| 38 | May 16 | @ Cubs | 5–9 | Lackey (4–3) | **Arroyo** (3–3) | — | 40,653 | 19–19 | | L4 |
| 39 | May 17 | @ Cubs | 5–7 | Hendricks (3–2) | **Feldman** (2–4) | Davis (9) | 38,715 | 19–20 | | L5 |
| 40 | May 18 | @ Cubs | 5–7 | Lester (2–2) | **Garrett** (3–3) | Uehara (1) | 36,023 | 19–21 | | L6 |
| 41 | May 19 | Rockies | 6–12 | Anderson (3–4) | **Bonilla** (0–2) | — | 23,184 | 19–22 | | L7 |
| 42 | May 20 | Rockies | 12–8 | **Wojciechowski** (1–0) | Dunn (2–1) | — | 25,188 | 20–22 | | W1 |
| 43 | May 21 | Rockies | 4–6 | Freeland (5–2) | **Arroyo** (3–4) | Holland (19) | 23,352 | 20–23 | | L1 |
| 44 | May 22 | Indians | 5–1 | **Feldman** (3–4) | Tomlin (2–6) | — | 26,794 | 21–23 | | W1 |
| 45 | May 23 | Indians | 7–8 | Miller (3–0) | **Storen** (1–1) | Allen (13) | 26,334 | 21–24 | | L1 |
| 46 | May 24 | @ Indians | 4–3 | **Lorenzen** (3–0) | Allen (0–2) | **Iglesias** (8) | 19,426 | 22–24 | | W1 |
| — | May 25 | @ Indians | **Postponed (rain)** (Makeup date: July 24) | | | | | | | |
| 47 | May 26 | @ Phillies | 5–2 | **Adleman** (3–2) | Nola (2–2) | **Iglesias** (9) | 21,388 | 23–24 | | W2 |
| 48 | May 27 | @ Phillies | 3–4 | Neris (2–2) | **Lorenzen** (3–1) | — | 30,100 | 23–25 | | L1 |
| 49 | May 28 | @ Phillies | 8–4 | **Feldman** (4–4) | Eflin (3–1) | — | 25,413 | 24–25 | | W1 |
| 50 | May 29 | @ Blue Jays | 2–17 | Stroman (6–2) | **Bonilla** (0–3) | — | 29,844 | 24–26 | | L1 |
| 51 | May 30 | @ Blue Jays | 4–6 | Smith (1–0) | **Wood** (0–3) | Osuna (10) | 32,747 | 24–27 | | L2 |
| 52 | May 31 | @ Blue Jays | 4–5 | Grilli (2–4) | **Peralta** (2–1) | Osuna (11) | 44,058 | 24–28 | | L3 |

June: 10–17 (Home: 8–6; Away: 2–11)

| # | Date | Opponent | Score | Win | Loss | Save | Attendance | Record | Box | Streak |
|---|---|---|---|---|---|---|---|---|---|---|
| 53 | June 2 | Braves | 3–2 (10) | **Iglesias** (2–0) | Ramirez (2–2) | — | 27,300 | 25–28 | | W1 |
| 54 | June 3 | Braves | 5–6 (12) | Johnson (3–1) | **Wood** (0–4) | — | 26,485 | 25–29 | | L1 |
| 55 | June 4 | Braves | 8–13 | Teherán (5–4) | **Garrett** (3–4) | — | 26,227 | 25–30 | | L2 |
| 56 | June 5 | Cardinals | 4–2 | **Bonilla** (1–3) | Martinez (4–5) | **Iglesias** (10) | 16,325 | 26–30 | | W1 |
| 57 | June 6 | Cardinals | 13–1 | **Adleman** (3–2) | Wainwright (6–4) | — | 18,620 | 27–30 | | W2 |
| 58 | June 7 | Cardinals | 6–4 | **Peralta** (3–1) | Cecil (0–2) | **Iglesias** (11) | 20,891 | 28–30 | | W3 |
| 59 | June 8 | Cardinals | 5–2 | **Feldman** (5–4) | Leake (5–5) | **Iglesias** (12) | 28,917 | 29–30 | | W4 |
| 60 | June 9 | @ Dodgers | 2–7 | Hill (3–2) | **Garrett** (3–5) | Maeda (1) | 44,036 | 29–31 | | L1 |
| 61 | June 10 | @ Dodgers | 4–5 | Jansen (4–0) | **Storen** (1–3) | — | 43,439 | 29–32 | | L2 |
| 62 | June 11 | @ Dodgers | 7–9 | Avilán (1–1) | **Iglesias** (2–1) | Jansen (11) | 42,674 | 29–33 | | L3 |
| 63 | June 12 | @ Padres | 3–9 | Perdomo (1–3) | **Arroyo** (3–5) | — | 17,006 | 29–34 | | L4 |
| 64 | June 13 | @ Padres | 2–6 | Richard (5–7) | **Feldman** (5–5) | Maurer (11) | 20,463 | 29–35 | | L5 |
| 65 | June 14 | @ Padres | 2–4 | Chacín (6–5) | **Lorenzen** (3–2) | Maurer (12) | 20,386 | 29–36 | | L6 |
| 66 | June 16 | Dodgers | 1–3 | Wood (7–0) | **Adleman** (4–3) | Jansen (14) | 35,613 | 29–37 | | L7 |
| 67 | June 17 | Dodgers | 2–10 | Ryu (3–6) | **Wojciechowski** (1–1) | — | 42,431 | 29–38 | | L8 |
| 68 | June 18 | Dodgers | 7–8 | Maeda (5–3) | **Arroyo** (3–6) | Jansen (15) | 27,316 | 29–39 | | L9 |
| 69 | June 19 | @ Rays | 7–3 | **Lorenzen** (4–2) | Alvarado (0–2) | — | 17,117 | 30–39 | | W1 |
| 70 | June 20 | @ Rays | 5–6 | Cobb (6–5) | **Garrett** (3–6) | Colomé (20) | 13,375 | 30–40 | | L1 |
| 71 | June 21 | @ Rays | 3–8 | Ramírez (4–2) | **Adleman** (4–4) | Whitley (2) | 19,619 | 30–41 | | L2 |
| 72 | June 23 | @ Nationals | 5–6 (10) | Albers (3–1) | **Iglesias** (2–2) | — | 36,347 | 30–42 | | L3 |
| 73 | June 24 | @ Nationals | 3–18 | Ross (4–3) | **Bailey** (0–1) | — | 40,139 | 30–43 | | L4 |
| 74 | June 25 | @ Nationals | 6–2 | **Feldman** (6–5) | Roark (6–5) | — | 35,387 | 31–43 | | W1 |
| 75 | June 26 | @ Cardinals | 2–8 | Wacha (4–3) | **Finnegan** (1–1) | — | 46,535 | 31–44 | | L1 |
| 76 | June 27 | Brewers | 8–6 | **Adleman** (5–4) | Guerra (1–2) | **Iglesias** (13) | 18,577 | 32–44 | | W1 |
| 77 | June 28 | Brewers | 4–3 | **Storen** (2–2) | Knebel (0–1) | **Iglesias** (14) | 21,842 | 33–44 | | W2 |
| 78 | June 29 | Brewers | 3–11 | **Nelson** (6–4) | Bailey (0–2) | — | 20,419 | 33–45 | | L1 |
| 79 | June 30 | Cubs | 5–0 | **Feldman** (7–5) | Montgomery (1–5) | — | 39,501 | 34–45 | | W1 |

July: 8–18 (Home: 3–9; Away: 5–9)

| # | Date | Opponent | Score | Win | Loss | Save | Attendance | Record | Box | Streak |
|---|---|---|---|---|---|---|---|---|---|---|
| 80 | July 1 | Cubs | 5–3 | **Stephens** (1–0) | Butler (4–3) | **Iglesias** (15) | 39,826 | 35–45 | | W2 |
| 81 | July 2 | Cubs | 2–6 | Arrieta (8–6) | **Adleman** (5–5) | — | 38,536 | 35–46 | | L1 |
| 82 | July 3 | @ Rockies | 3–5 | Hoffman (5–1) | **Castillo** (0–1) | Holland (27) | 49,131 | 35–47 | | L2 |
| 83 | July 4 | @ Rockies | 8–1 | **Bailey** (1–2) | Freeland (8–7) | — | 48,338 | 36–47 | | W1 |
| 84 | July 5 | @ Rockies | 3–5 | Gray (2–0) | **Feldman** (7–6) | Holland (28) | 32,188 | 36–48 | | L1 |
| 85 | July 6 | @ Rockies | 6–3 | **Romano** (1–1) | Chatwood (6–10) | — | 27,328 | 37–48 | | W1 |
| 86 | July 7 | @ D-Backs | 3–6 | Greinke (11–4) | **Adleman** (5–6) | Rodney (22) | 27,006 | 37–49 | | L1 |
| 87 | July 8 | @ D-Backs | 7–0 | **Castillo** (1–0) | Walker (6–4) | — | 29,806 | 38–49 | | W1 |
| 88 | July 9 | @ D-Backs | 2–1 | **Bailey** (2–2) | Corbin (6–9) | **Iglesias** (16) | 24,923 | 39–49 | | W2 |
**2017 Major League Baseball All-Star Game: Miami, Florida at Marlins Park**
| 89 | July 14 | Nationals | 0–5 | González (8–4) | **Adleman** (5–7) | Grace (1) | 28,916 | 39–50 | | L1 |
| 90 | July 15 | Nationals | 7–10 | Scherzer (11–5) | **Castillo** (1–2) | Grace (2) | 36,462 | 39–51 | | L2 |
| 91 | July 16 | Nationals | 4–14 | Roark (7–6) | **Bailey** (2–3) | — | 25,712 | 39–52 | | L3 |
| 92 | July 17 | Nationals | 1–6 | Strasburg (10–3) | **Feldman** (7–7) | — | 17,574 | 39–53 | | L4 |
| 93 | July 18 | D-Backs | 2–11 | Ray (9–4) | **Romano** (1–2) | — | 19,989 | 39–54 | | L5 |
| 94 | July 19 | D-Backs | 4–3 (11) | **Lorenzen** (5–2) | McFarland (4–2) | — | 16,573 | 40–54 | | W1 |
| 95 | July 20 | D-Backs | 2–12 | Corbin (7–9) | **Castillo** (1–3) | — | 19,711 | 40–55 | | L1 |
| 96 | July 21 | Marlins | 1–3 | Ureña (8–4) | **Bailey** (2–4) | Ramos (18) | 21,851 | 40–56 | | L2 |
| 97 | July 22 | Marlins | 4–5 | Wittgren (3–1) | **Stephenson** (0–3) | **Ramos** (19) | 24,099 | 40–57 | | L3 |
| 98 | July 23 | Marlins | 6–3 | **Romano** (2–2) | Koehler (1–5) | **Igiesias** (17) | 20,526 | 41–57 | | W1 |
| 99 | July 24 | @ Indians | 2–6 | Tomlin (7–9) | **Adleman** (5–8) | — | 21,500 | 41–58 | | L1 |
| 100 | July 25 | @ Yankees | 2–4 | Montgomery (7–5) | **Castillo** (1–4) | Chapman (12) | 44,268 | 41–59 | | L2 |
| 101 | July 26 | @ Yankees | 5–9 | Severino (7–4) | **Bailey** (2–5) | — | 42,421 | 41–60 | | L3 |
| 102 | July 27 | @ Marlins | 1–4 | O'Grady (2–1) | **Stephenson** (0–4) | Ramos (20) | 19,986 | 41–61 | | L4 |
| 103 | July 28 | @ Marlins | 4–7 | McGowan (6–1) | **Peralta** (3–2) | — | 17,440 | 41–62 | | L5 |
| 104 | July 29 | @ Marlins | 3–7 | Conley (4–3) | **Adleman** (5–9) | — | 20,297 | 41–63 | | L6 |
| 105 | July 30 | @ Marlins | 6–4 | **Castillo** (2–4) | Straily (7–7) | — | 19,947 | 42–63 | | W1 |

August: 15–14 (Home: 8–8; Away: 7–6)

| # | Date | Opponent | Score | Win | Loss | Save | Attendance | Record | Box | Streak |
|---|---|---|---|---|---|---|---|---|---|---|
| 106 | August 1 | @ Pirates | 9–1 | **Bailey** (3–5) | Taillon (6–5) | — | 22,403 | 43–63 | | W2 |
| 107 | August 2 | @ Pirates | 5–2 | **Lorenzen** (6–2) | Benoit (1–5) | **Iglesias** (18) | 22,367 | 44–63 | | W3 |
| 108 | August 3 | @ Pirates | 0–6 | Kuhl (4–7) | **Romano** (2–3) | — | 25,955 | 44–64 | | L1 |
| 109 | August 4 | Cardinals | 3–2 | **Wojciechowski** (2–1) | Leake (7–10) | **Iglesias** (19) | 36,443 | 45–64 | | W1 |
| 110 | August 5 | Cardinals | 1–4 | Lynn (10–6) | **Castillo** (2–5) | Rosenthal (8) | 35,571 | 45–65 | | L1 |
| 111 | August 6 | Cardinals | 4–13 | Cecil (2–4) | **Bailey** (3–6) | — | 25,168 | 45–66 | | L2 |
| 112 | August 7 | Padres | 11–3 | **Wood** (1–4) | Chacín (11–8) | — | 16,240 | 46–66 | | W1 |
| 113 | August 8 | Padres | 3–7 | Perdomo (6–6) | **Romano** (2–4) | — | 13,683 | 46–67 | | L1 |
| 114 | August 9 | Padres | 8–3 | **Wojciechowski** (3–1) | Wood (2–4) | — | 15,450 | 47–67 | | W1 |
| 115 | August 10 | Padres | 10–3 | **Storen** (3–2) | Yates (2–3) | — | 14,915 | 48–67 | | W2 |
| 116 | August 11 | @ Brewers | 11–10 | **Bailey** (4–6) | Nelson (9–6) | **Iglesias** (20) | 34,517 | 49–67 | | W3 |
| 117 | August 12 | @ Brewers | 5–6 (10) | Knebel (1–2) | **Adleman** (5–10) | — | 38,256 | 49–68 | | L1 |
| 118 | August 13 | @ Brewers | 4–7 | Garza (6–6) | **Romano** (2–5) | Knebel (22) | 43,248 | 49–69 | | L2 |
| 119 | August 14 | @ Cubs | 5–15 | Quintana (7–10) | **Wojciechowski** (3–2) | — | 40,263 | 49–70 | | L3 |
| 120 | August 15 | @ Cubs | 2–1 | **Lorenzen** (7–2) | Strop (3–3) | **Iglesias** (21) | 36,698 | 50–70 | | W1 |
| 121 | August 16 | @ Cubs | 6–7 | Davis (3–1) | **Peralta** (3–3) | — | 37,021 | 50–71 | | L1 |
| 122 | August 17 | @ Cubs | 13–10 | **Storen** (4–2) | Grimm (1–2) | **Iglesias** (22) | 38,675 | 51–71 | | W1 |
| 123 | August 18 | @ Braves | 5–3 | **Romano** (3–5) | Dickey (8–8) | **Iglesias** (23) | 31,174 | 52–71 | | W2 |
| 124 | August 19 | @ Braves | 11–8 | **Stephenson** (1–4) | Teherán (7–11) | — | 39,317 | 53–71 | | W3 |
| 125 | August 20 | @ Braves | 1–8 | Newcomb (2–7) | **Castillo** (2–6) | — | 25,758 | 53–72 | | L1 |
| 126 | August 22 | Cubs | 9–13 | Rondón (4–1) | **Peralta** (3–4) | — | 16,467 | 53–73 | | L2 |
| 127 | August 23 | Cubs | 3–9 | Montgomery (4–6) | **Wojciechowski** (3–3) | — | 15,355 | 53–74 | | L3 |
| 128 | August 24 | Cubs | 4–2 | **Lorenzen** (8–2) | Strop (3–4) | **Iglesias** (24) | 18,191 | 54–74 | | W1 |
| 129 | August 25 | Pirates | 9–5 | **Stephenson** (2–4) | Nova (11–11) | — | 20,561 | 55–74 | | W2 |
| 130 | August 26 | Pirates | 0–1 | Cole (11–8) | **Castillo** (2–7) | Rivero (15) | 35,259 | 55–75 | | L1 |
| 131 | August 27 | Pirates | 2–5 | Schugel (3–0) | **Mahle** (0–1) | Rivero (16) | 26,155 | 55–76 | | L2 |
| 132 | August 29 | Mets | 14–4 | **Romano** (4–5) | Flexen (3–3) | — | 12,946 | 56–76 | | W1 |
| 133 | August 30 | Mets | 0–2 | Montero (3–9) | **Bailey** (4–7) | Ramos (26) | 12,491 | 56–77 | | L1 |
| 134 | August 31 | Mets | 7–2 | **Stephenson** (3–4) | deGrom (14–8) | — | 13,634 | 57–77 | | W1 |

September/October: 11–17 (Home: 6–6; Away: 5–11)

| # | Date | Opponent | Score | Win | Loss | Save | Attendance | Record | Box | Streak |
|---|---|---|---|---|---|---|---|---|---|---|
| 135 | September 1 | @ Pirates | 7–3 | **Wojciechowski** (4–3) | Cole (11–9) | — | 23,569 | 58–77 | | W2 |
| 136 | September 2 | @ Pirates | 0–5 | Schugel (4–0) | **Lorenzen** (8–3) | — | 23,529 | 58–78 | | L1 |
| 137 | September 3 | @ Pirates | 1–3 | Williams (6–7) | **Romano** (4–6) | Rivero (17) | 24,474 | 58–79 | | L2 |
| 138 | September 4 | Brewers | 5–4 | **Iglesias** (3–2) | Hader (1–3) | — | 22,403 | 59–79 | | W1 |
| 139 | September 5 | Brewers | 9–3 | **Stephenson** (4–4) | Davies (16–8) | **Iglesias** (25) | 12,135 | 60–79 | | W2 |
| 140 | September 6 | Brewers | 7–1 | **Castillo** (3–7) | Garza (6–9) | — | 12,626 | 61–79 | | W3 |
| 141 | September 7 | @ Mets | 2–7 | Harvey (5–4) | **Mahle** (0–2) | — | 21,274 | 61–80 | | L1 |
| 142 | September 8 | @ Mets | 1–5 | Lugo (6–4) | **Garrett** (3–7) | Ramos (27) | 25,864 | 61–81 | | L2 |
| 143 | September 9 | @ Mets | 1–6 | Montero (5–9) | **Bailey** (4–8) | — | 30,661 | 61–82 | | L3 |
| 144 | September 10 | @ Mets | 10–5 | **Stephens** (2–0) | Familia (1–2) | **Iglesias** (26) | 27,590 | 62–82 | | W1 |
| 145 | September 12 | @ Cardinals | 4–13 | Lynn (11–7) | **Stephenson** (4–5) | — | 40,030 | 62–83 | | L1 |
| 146 | September 13 | @ Cardinals | 6–0 | **Mahle** (1–2) | Flaherty (0–1) | — | 40,124 | 63–83 | | W1 |
| 147 | September 14 | @ Cardinals | 2–5 | Weaver (6–1) | **Garrett** (3–8) | — | 40,230 | 63–84 | | L1 |
| 148 | September 15 | Pirates | 4–2 | **Bailey** (5–8) | Kuhl (7–11) | **Iglesias** (27) | 17,625 | 64–84 | | W1 |
| 149 | September 16 | Pirates | 2–1 | **Romano** (5–6) | Nova (11–14) | **Reed** (1) | 25,685 | 65–84 | | W2 |
| 150 | September 17 | Pirates | 5–2 | **Stephenson** (5–5) | Cole (11–11) | **Lorenzen** (2) | 22,228 | 66–84 | | W3 |
| 151 | September 19 | Cardinals | 7–8 (10) | Nicasio (4–5) | **Adleman** (5–11) | Lyons (3) | 17,165 | 66–85 | | L1 |
| 152 | September 20 | Cardinals | 2–9 | Weaver (7–1) | **Davis** (1–3) | — | 12,903 | 66–86 | | L2 |
| 153 | September 21 | Cardinals | 5–8 | Martinez (12–11) | **Bailey** (5–9) | — | 14,803 | 66–87 | | L3 |
| 154 | September 22 | Red Sox | 4–5 | Price (6–3) | **Romano** (5–7) | Kimbrel (34) | 23,463 | 66–88 | | L4 |
| 155 | September 23 | Red Sox | 0–5 | Rodriguez (6–6) | **Stephenson** (5–6) | — | 36,076 | 66–89 | | L5 |
| 156 | September 24 | Red Sox | 4–5 | Scott (2–1) | **Iglesias** (3–3) | Kimbrel (35) | 25,545 | 66–90 | | L6 |
| 157 | September 26 | @ Brewers | 6–7 | Hader (2–3) | **McGuire** (0–1) | Knebel (38) | 30,079 | 66–91 | | L7 |
| 158 | September 27 | @ Brewers | 6–0 | **Bailey** (6–9) | Woodruff (2–3) | — | 34,882 | 67–91 | | W1 |
| 159 | September 28 | @ Brewers | 3–4 | Hughes (5–3) | **Romano** (5–8) | Knebel (39) | 30,293 | 67–92 | | L1 |
| 160 | September 29 | @ Cubs | 4–5 | Duensing (1–1) | **Lorenzen** (8–4) | Grimm (1) | 36,258 | 67–93 | | L2 |
| 161 | September 30 | @ Cubs | 0–9 | Lester (13–8) | **Stephens** (2–1) | — | 41,493 | 67–94 | | L3 |
| 162 | October 1 | @ Cubs | 3–1 | **McGuire** (1–1) | Lackey (12–12 ) | **Iglesias** (28) | 40,971 | 68–94 | | W1 |

Legend: = Win = Loss = Postponement
Bold = Reds team member

== Roster ==
2017 Cincinnati Reds
Roster
| Pitchers: 46 Tim Adleman; 61 Bronson Arroyo; 48 Barrett Astin; 34 Homer Bailey; 51 Lisalverto Bonilla; 40 Austin Brice; 41 Jake Buchanan; 58 Luis Castillo; 67 Alejandro Chacin; 52 Tony Cingrani; 54 Rookie Davis; 52 Luke Farrell; 37 Scott Feldman; 29 Brandon Finnegan; 50 Amir Garrett; 63 Ariel Hernández; 26 Raisel Iglesias; 21 Michael Lorenzen; 30 Tyler Mahle; 68 Deck McGuire; 36 Keury Mella; 53 Wandy Peralta; 25 Cody Reed; 47 Sal Romano; 41 Kevin Shackelford; 62 Jackson Stephens; 55 Robert Stephenson; 31 Drew Storen; 65 Asher Wojciechowski; 36 Blake Wood | Catchers: 16 Tucker Barnhart; 39 Devin Mesoraco; 32 Stuart Turner; 49 Chad Wallach; Infielders: 30 Arismendy Alcántara; 2 Zack Cozart; 4 Scooter Gennett; 9 José Peraza; 7 Eugenio Suárez; 12 Zach Vincej; 19 Joey Votto | Outfielders: 23 Adam Duvall; 27 Phil Ervin; 6 Billy Hamilton; 3 Patrick Kivlehan; 43 Scott Schebler; 33 Jesse Winker | Manager: 38 Bryan Price; Coaches: 45 Freddie Benavides (first base/infield); 22 Billy Hatcher (third base/outfield); 87 Dustin Hughes (bullpen catcher); 64 Tony Jaramillo (assistant hitting); 57 Mack Jenkins (pitching); 59 Don Long (hitting); 56 Ted Power (assistant pitching/bullpen); 35 Jim Riggleman (bench); 72 Mike Stefanski (catching) |

== Statistics ==
Players in bold are on the active MLB roster as of the 2022 season.

Final batting and pitching stats as of October 1, 2017.

=== Batting ===
Note: G = Games played; AB = At bats; R = Runs scored; H = Hits; 2B = Doubles; 3B = Triples; HR = Home runs; RBI = Runs batted in; AVG = Batting average; SB = Stolen bases

| Player | G | AB | R | H | 2B | 3B | HR | RBI | AVG | SB |
|---|---|---|---|---|---|---|---|---|---|---|
| Tim Adleman | 27 | 29 | 0 | 3 | 1 | 0 | 0 | 2 | .103 | 0 |
| Arismendy Alcántara | 70 | 105 | 13 | 18 | 3 | 1 | 1 | 7 | .171 | 2 |
| Bronson Arroyo | 15 | 26 | 0 | 4 | 0 | 0 | 0 | 0 | .154 | 0 |
| Barrett Astin | 6 | 1 | 0 | 0 | 0 | 0 | 0 | 0 | .000 | 0 |
| Homer Bailey | 17 | 28 | 4 | 7 | 2 | 0 | 0 | 1 | .250 | 0 |
| **Tucker Barnhart** | 121 | 370 | 26 | 100 | 24 | 2 | 7 | 44 | .270 | 4 |
| Lisalverto Bonilla | 7 | 6 | 0 | 1 | 0 | 0 | 0 | 0 | .167 | 0 |
| **Austin Brice** | 21 | 4 | 0 | 0 | 0 | 0 | 0 | 0 | .000 | 0 |
| Jake Buchanan | 4 | 2 | 1 | 1 | 0 | 0 | 0 | 1 | .500 | 0 |
| **Luis Castillo** | 15 | 29 | 0 | 2 | 0 | 0 | 0 | 1 | .069 | 0 |
| Zack Cozart | 122 | 438 | 80 | 130 | 24 | 7 | 24 | 63 | .297 | 3 |
| Rookie Davis | 7 | 6 | 0 | 1 | 1 | 0 | 0 | 0 | .167 | 0 |
| **Adam Duvall** | 157 | 587 | 78 | 146 | 37 | 3 | 31 | 99 | .249 | 5 |
| Phillip Ervin | 28 | 58 | 8 | 15 | 2 | 0 | 3 | 10 | .259 | 4 |
| Scott Feldman | 20 | 34 | 0 | 1 | 0 | 0 | 0 | 0 | .029 | 0 |
| Brandon Finnegan | 5 | 5 | 0 | 0 | 0 | 0 | 0 | 0 | .000 | 0 |
| **Amir Garrett** | 15 | 19 | 1 | 1 | 1 | 0 | 0 | 1 | .053 | 0 |
| Scooter Gennett | 141 | 461 | 80 | 136 | 22 | 3 | 27 | 97 | .295 | 3 |
| **Billy Hamilton** | 139 | 582 | 85 | 144 | 17 | 11 | 4 | 38 | .247 | 59 |
| Ariel Hernández | 17 | 2 | 0 | 0 | 0 | 0 | 0 | 0 | .000 | 0 |
| **Raisel Iglesias** | 60 | 1 | 0 | 1 | 1 | 0 | 0 | 0 | 1.000 | 0 |
| Patrick Kivlehan | 115 | 178 | 23 | 37 | 5 | 1 | 9 | 26 | .208 | 1 |
| **Michael Lorenzen** | 70 | 12 | 1 | 2 | 0 | 0 | 1 | 1 | .167 | 0 |
| **Tyler Mahle** | 4 | 7 | 1 | 1 | 0 | 0 | 0 | 0 | .143 | 0 |
| Deck McGuire | 6 | 3 | 0 | 0 | 0 | 0 | 0 | 1 | .000 | 0 |
| Devin Mesoraco | 56 | 141 | 17 | 30 | 5 | 1 | 6 | 14 | .213 | 1 |
| José Peraza | 143 | 487 | 50 | 126 | 9 | 4 | 5 | 37 | .259 | 23 |
| Cody Reed | 12 | 2 | 0 | 0 | 0 | 0 | 0 | 0 | .000 | 0 |
| Sal Romano | 16 | 24 | 0 | 1 | 1 | 0 | 0 | 0 | .042 | 0 |
| Kevin Shackelford | 26 | 3 | 0 | 1 | 0 | 0 | 0 | 2 | .333 | 0 |
| Scott Schebler | 141 | 473 | 63 | 110 | 25 | 2 | 30 | 67 | .233 | 5 |
| **Jackson Stephens** | 7 | 6 | 1 | 2 | 0 | 0 | 0 | 2 | .333 | 0 |
| **Robert Stephenson** | 25 | 23 | 1 | 1 | 0 | 0 | 0 | 0 | .043 | 0 |
| Drew Storen | 55 | 1 | 0 | 0 | 0 | 0 | 0 | 0 | .000 | 0 |
| **Eugenio Suárez** | 156 | 534 | 87 | 139 | 25 | 2 | 26 | 82 | .260 | 4 |
| Stuart Turner | 37 | 82 | 4 | 11 | 3 | 0 | 2 | 7 | .134 | 0 |
| Zach Vincej | 9 | 9 | 2 | 1 | 0 | 0 | 0 | 0 | .111 | 0 |
| **Joey Votto** | 162 | 559 | 106 | 179 | 34 | 1 | 36 | 100 | .320 | 5 |
| **Chad Wallach** | 6 | 11 | 0 | 1 | 0 | 0 | 0 | 0 | .091 | 0 |
| **Jesse Winker** | 47 | 121 | 21 | 36 | 7 | 0 | 7 | 15 | .298 | 1 |
| Asher Wojciechowski | 23 | 14 | 0 | 1 | 0 | 0 | 0 | 0 | .071 | 0 |
| Blake Wood | 52 | 1 | 0 | 0 | 0 | 0 | 0 | 0 | .000 | 0 |
| **Team totals** | **162** | **5484** | **753** | **1390** | **249** | **38** | **219** | **715** | **.253** | **120** |

=== Pitching ===
Note: W = Wins; L = Losses; ERA = Earned run average; G = Games pitched; GS = Games started; SV = Saves; IP = Innings pitched; H = Hits allowed; R = Runs allowed; ER = Earned runs allowed; BB = Walks allowed; SO = Strikeouts

| Player | W | L | ERA | G | GS | SV | IP | H | R | ER | BB | K |
|---|---|---|---|---|---|---|---|---|---|---|---|---|
| Tim Adleman | 5 | 11 | 5.52 | 30 | 20 | 0 | 122.1 | 124 | 79 | 75 | 51 | 108 |
| Bronson Arroyo | 3 | 6 | 7.35 | 14 | 14 | 0 | 71.0 | 94 | 59 | 58 | 19 | 45 |
| Barrett Astin | 0 | 0 | 6.75 | 6 | 0 | 0 | 8.0 | 9 | 6 | 6 | 7 | 2 |
| Homer Bailey | 6 | 9 | 6.43 | 18 | 18 | 0 | 91.0 | 112 | 65 | 65 | 42 | 67 |
| Lisalverto Bonilla | 1 | 3 | 8.10 | 10 | 4 | 0 | 36.2 | 42 | 33 | 33 | 22 | 28 |
| **Austin Brice** | 0 | 0 | 4.96 | 22 | 0 | 0 | 32.2 | 33 | 18 | 18 | 7 | 26 |
| Jake Buchanan | 0 | 0 | 8.10 | 5 | 0 | 0 | 14.1 | 24 | 13 | 13 | 7 | 4 |
| **Luis Castillo** | 3 | 7 | 3.12 | 15 | 15 | 0 | 89.1 | 64 | 31 | 31 | 32 | 98 |
| Alejandro Chacin | 0 | 0 | 10.50 | 6 | 0 | 0 | 6.0 | 11 | 7 | 7 | 4 | 6 |
| Tony Cingrani | 0 | 0 | 5.40 | 25 | 0 | 0 | 23.1 | 25 | 14 | 14 | 6 | 24 |
| Rookie Davis | 1 | 3 | 8.63 | 7 | 6 | 0 | 24.0 | 38 | 25 | 23 | 14 | 20 |
| **Luke Farrell** | 0 | 0 | 2.61 | 9 | 0 | 0 | 10.1 | 5 | 3 | 3 | 7 | 7 |
| Scott Feldman | 7 | 7 | 4.77 | 21 | 21 | 0 | 111.1 | 116 | 62 | 59 | 35 | 93 |
| Brandon Finnegan | 1 | 1 | 4.15 | 4 | 4 | 0 | 13.0 | 9 | 6 | 6 | 13 | 16 |
| **Amir Garrett** | 3 | 8 | 7.39 | 16 | 14 | 0 | 70.2 | 74 | 60 | 58 | 40 | 63 |
| Scooter Gennett | 0 | 0 | 18.00 | 1 | 0 | 0 | 1.0 | 2 | 2 | 2 | 1 | 0 |
| Ariel Hernández | 0 | 0 | 5.18 | 19 | 0 | 0 | 24.1 | 14 | 14 | 14 | 22 | 29 |
| **Raisel Iglesias** | 3 | 3 | 2.49 | 63 | 0 | 28 | 76.0 | 57 | 22 | 21 | 27 | 92 |
| **Michael Lorenzen** | 8 | 4 | 4.45 | 70 | 0 | 2 | 83.0 | 78 | 41 | 41 | 34 | 80 |
| **Tyler Mahle** | 1 | 2 | 2.70 | 4 | 4 | 0 | 20.0 | 19 | 6 | 6 | 11 | 14 |
| Deck McGuire | 1 | 1 | 2.63 | 6 | 2 | 0 | 13.2 | 10 | 6 | 4 | 2 | 11 |
| Keury Mella | 0 | 0 | 6.75 | 2 | 0 | 0 | 4.0 | 5 | 3 | 3 | 2 | 1 |
| **Wandy Peralta** | 3 | 4 | 3.76 | 69 | 0 | 0 | 64.2 | 53 | 27 | 27 | 24 | 57 |
| Cody Reed | 1 | 1 | 5.09 | 12 | 1 | 1 | 17.2 | 11 | 10 | 10 | 19 | 17 |
| Sal Romano | 5 | 8 | 4.45 | 16 | 16 | 0 | 87.0 | 91 | 43 | 43 | 37 | 73 |
| Kevin Shackelford | 0 | 0 | 4.70 | 26 | 0 | 0 | 30.2 | 30 | 16 | 16 | 13 | 38 |
| **Jackson Stephens** | 2 | 1 | 4.68 | 7 | 4 | 0 | 25.0 | 19 | 13 | 13 | 9 | 21 |
| **Robert Stephenson** | 5 | 6 | 4.68 | 25 | 11 | 1 | 84.2 | 81 | 46 | 44 | 53 | 86 |
| Drew Storen | 4 | 2 | 4.45 | 58 | 0 | 1 | 54.2 | 57 | 29 | 27 | 23 | 48 |
| Asher Wojciechowski | 4 | 3 | 6.50 | 25 | 8 | 0 | 62.1 | 71 | 47 | 45 | 19 | 64 |
| Blake Wood | 1 | 4 | 5.65 | 55 | 0 | 0 | 57.1 | 64 | 40 | 36 | 29 | 62 |
| **Team totals** | **68** | **94** | **5.17** | **162** | **162** | **33** | **1430.0** | **1442** | **869** | **821** | **631** | **1300** |

== Farm system ==
| Level | Team | League | Manager |
|---|---|---|---|
| AAA | Louisville Bats | International League | Delino DeShields |
| AA | Pensacola Blue Wahoos | Southern League | Pat Kelly |
| A | Daytona Tortugas | Florida State League | Eli Marrero |
| A | Dayton Dragons | Midwest League | Luis Bolivar |
| A-Rookie Advanced | Billings Mustangs | Pioneer League | Ray Martínez |
| Rookie | AZL Reds | Arizona League | José Nieves |
| Rookie | DSL Reds | Dominican Summer League | |
| Rookie | DSL Rojos | Dominican Summer League | |

== See also ==
- List of Major League Baseball single-game home run leaders
- List of Major League Baseball single-game runs batted in leaders
