= Ariel Hernández =

Ariel Hernández may refer to:

- Ariel Hernández (boxer), Cuban boxer
- Ariel Hernández (singer), American singer in No Mercy
- Ariel Hernández (baseball), Baseball player
