= Amir Garrett =

American baseball player (born 1992)

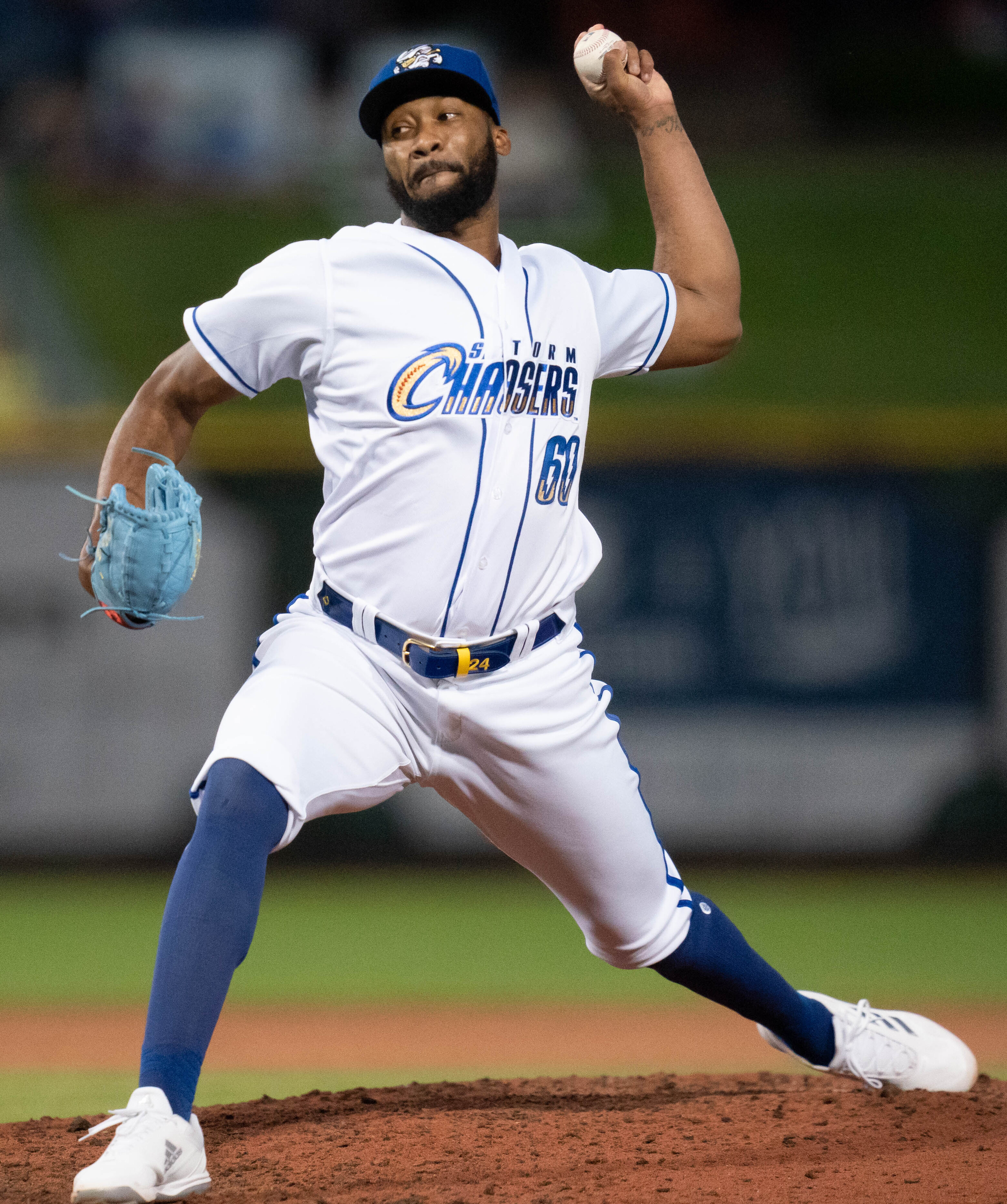
- Garrett with the Omaha Storm Chasers in 2022

Free agent
- Pitcher
- Born: May 3, 1992 (age 34); Victorville, California, U.S.
- Bats: Right Throws: Left

MLB debut
- April 7, 2017, for the Cincinnati Reds

MLB statistics (through 2024 season)
- Win–loss record: 13–19
- Earned run average: 4.96
- Strikeouts: 383
- Stats at Baseball Reference

Teams
- Cincinnati Reds (2017–2021); Kansas City Royals (2022–2023); Los Angeles Angels (2024)

Amir Jamal Garrett (born May 3, 1992) is an American professional baseball pitcher who is a free agent. He has previously played in Major League Baseball (MLB) for the Cincinnati Reds, Kansas City Royals, and Los Angeles Angels. Garrett played college basketball for the St. John's Red Storm before pursuing a baseball career fully. He was drafted by the Reds in 2011 and made his MLB debut in 2017.

== Early years ==
Garrett began his high school career at Sierra Vista High School in Spring Valley, Nevada, before he transferred to Leuzinger High School in Lawndale, California, for his junior year. For his senior year in 2010, he transferred to Findlay Prep in Henderson, Nevada to play basketball. His father convinced him to give baseball another chance, so he held a training session for Major League Baseball (MLB) scouts, in which he threw a fastball upwards of 96 miles per hour (154 km/h).

Eligible in the 2011 MLB draft, the Cincinnati Reds selected Garrett in the 22nd round. He signed with the Reds, receiving a $1 million signing bonus and permission to continue his basketball career. In the fall of 2011, Garrett enrolled at Bridgton Academy in Bridgton, Maine, where he played on the basketball team throughout the 2011–12 season.

== College career ==
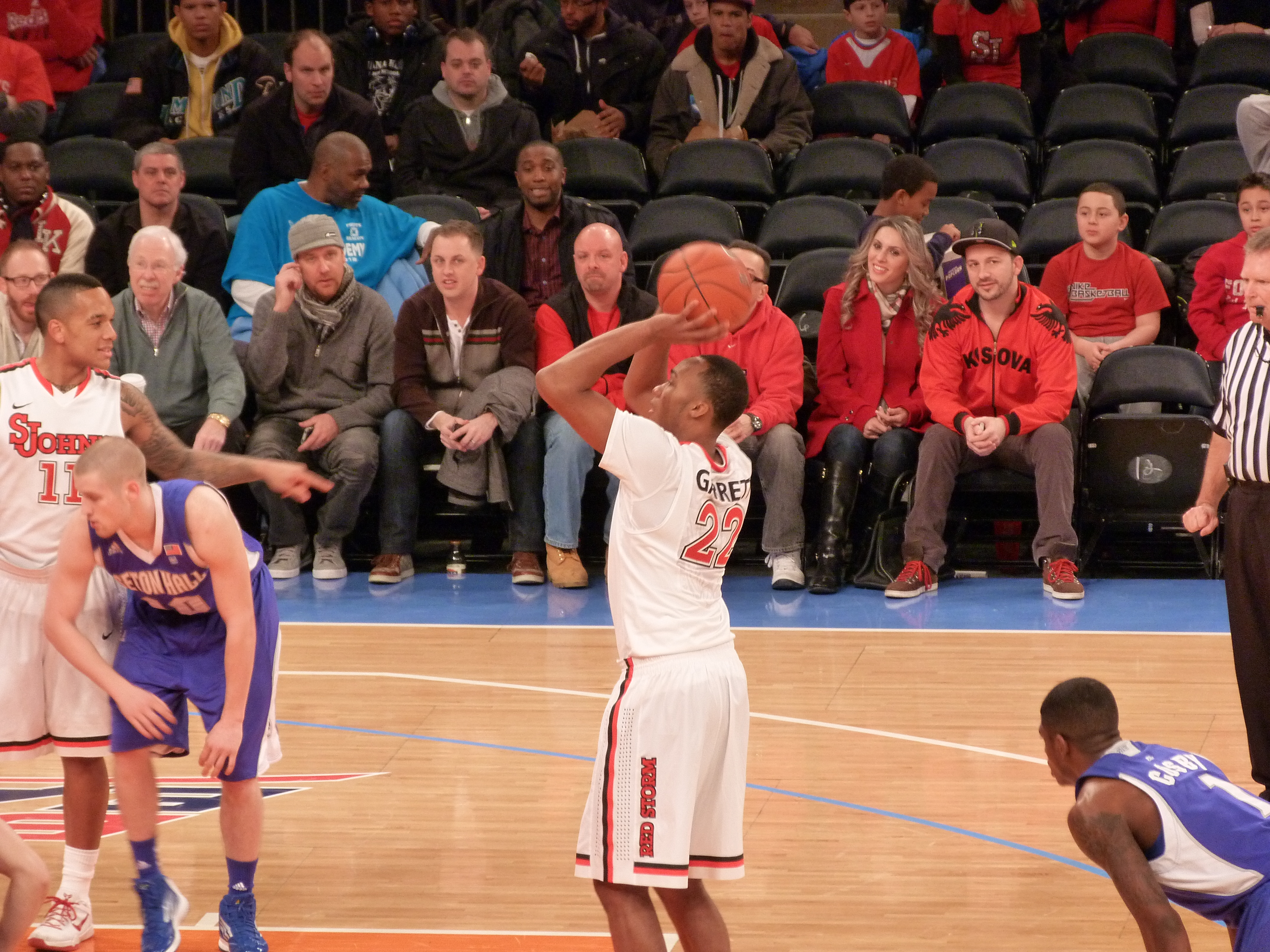
Garrett with St. John's in 2013

Heading into college, Garrett was a four-star basketball recruit, ranked 68th in the country, and the 21st best small forward. Garrett committed to attend St. John's University to play college basketball for the St. John's Red Storm men's basketball team.

College recruiting
Name	Hometown	School	Height	Weight	Commit date
Amir Garrett; SF	Los Angeles, CA	Bridgton Academy	6 ft 6 in (1.98 m)	190 lb (86 kg)	Nov 17, 2010
Amir Garrett; SF	Recruit ratings: Scout: Rivals: 247Sports: (92)				
Overall recruit ranking: Scout: 72nd Rivals: 68th ESPN: 99th
Note: In many cases, Scout, Rivals, 247Sports, On3, and ESPN may conflict in their listings of height and weight.; In these cases, the average was taken. ESPN grades are on a 100-point scale.; Sources: "2011 Team Ranking". Rivals.

Garrett was ruled ineligible to play for the college basketball team for the fall semester of his freshman year, in the 2011–12 season, due to academic reasons. He instead spent the fall semester at Bridgton Academy in Bridgton, Maine where he participated in the fall baseball program. He was declared eligible in December. As a freshman, Garrett played 26.9 minutes per game. After the basketball season, Garrett played baseball for the Arizona Reds of the Rookie-level Arizona League and the Billings Mustangs of the Rookie-level Pioneer League, pitching to a 4.05 earned run average (ERA) with 18 strikeouts and 13 walks in 20 innings pitched.

As a sophomore, Garrett started 11 games, averaging 5.4 points per game and 4.3 rebounds per game in 20.1 minutes per game. After the 2012–13 college basketball season, Garrett announced that he was leaving St. John's, with the intention of transferring to another college basketball team. He transferred to California State University, Northridge, and sat out the 2013–14 season due to NCAA transfer rules. After redshirting his first year, Garrett withdrew from the Matadors to pursue a pro baseball career.

== Professional career ==
=== Cincinnati Reds ===
Garrett began the 2013 baseball season with Billings, but was promoted to the Dayton Dragons of the Single–A Midwest League in July. He finished the season with a 5.15 ERA, 32 strikeouts, and 26 walks in 57 2/3 innings. He returned to Dayton for the start of the 2014 season. In August 2014, Garrett decided to quit basketball and withdraw from Cal-State Northridge in order to focus on baseball. He had a 7–8 record and a 3.65 ERA in 27 games started, and the Reds added him to their 40-man roster after the season. He began the 2015 season with the Daytona Tortugas of the High–A Florida State League (FSL), and was chosen to represent the Reds at the 2015 All-Star Futures Game. Garrett finished the 2015 season with a 2.44 ERA and 133 strikeouts for Daytona, and with Jacob Faria, was named the Co-FSL Pitcher of the Year.

Garrett opened the 2016 season with the Pensacola Blue Wahoos of the Double–A Southern League. The Reds promoted him to the Louisville Bats of the Triple–A International League in June. He was named to appear in the 2016 All-Star Futures Game. He finished 2016 with a 7–8 record and a 2.55 ERA.

Garrett made the Reds' Opening Day roster in 2017. In his major league debut on April 7 against the St. Louis Cardinals, Garrett went six shutout innings, giving up just two hits and earning the win in the Reds 2–0 victory over the Cardinals.

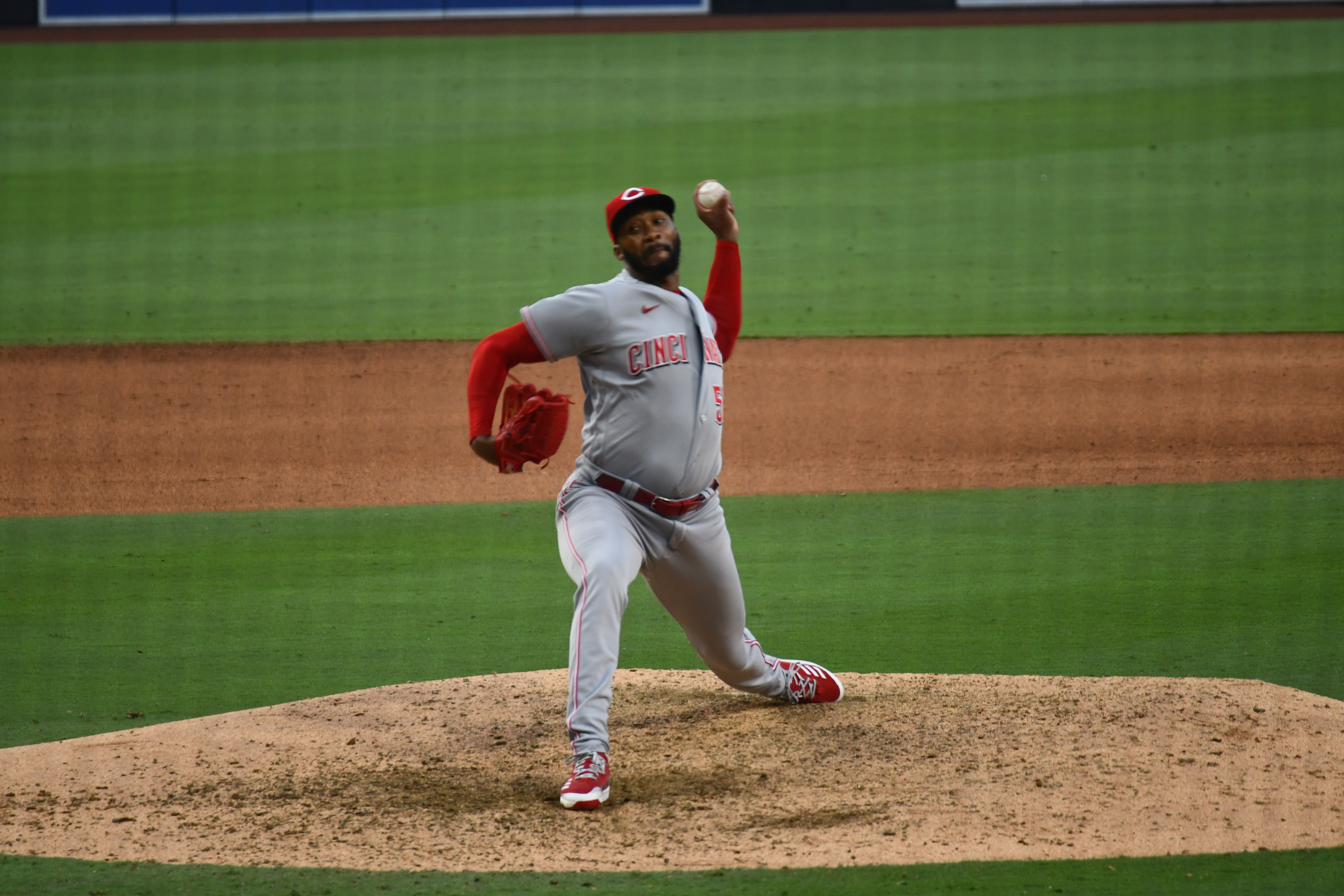
Garrett pitching for the Reds during the 2021 season

On May 7, Garrett was optioned down to the Reds' Triple–A affiliate, the Louisville Bats, after Barrett Astin was recalled. On May 25, Garrett was placed on the 10-day disabled list due to right hip inflammation. Garrett was optioned and recalled multiple times during the season. In 14 starts for Louisville he was 2–4 with a 5.72 ERA, and in 16 games (14 starts) for Cincinnati, he compiled a 3–8 record and 7.39 ERA.

Garrett began the 2018 season in the Cincinnati bullpen. In 66 games, he was 1–2 with a 4.29 ERA and 71 strikeouts in 63 innings.

In an April 7, 2019, game against the Pittsburgh Pirates, Garrett was ejected after his role in a bench clearing incident involving Chris Archer, Derek Dietrich, Yasiel Puig, David Bell, Keone Kela, and Felipe Vázquez. Garrett was involved in another bench clearing incident against the Pirates on July 30, charging the Pirates dugout and throwing punches at players in the dugout. Garrett was ejected along with Puig, Archer, Francisco Cervelli, Kyle Crick, and Trevor Williams. On August 1, 2019, Garrett was suspended for 8 games.

In 2020 for Cincinnati, Garrett appeared in 21 games, recording a 2.45 ERA with 26 strikeouts in 18 1/3 innings pitched. Garrett had a 6.04 ERA in 63 appearances in 2021.

=== Kansas City Royals ===
On March 16, 2022, the Reds traded Garrett to the Kansas City Royals in exchange for Mike Minor. The Royals placed Garrett on the injured list on May 31. He appeared in 16 contests for the team in 2022, recording a 4.96 ERA with 49 strikeouts in 45 1/3 innings of work.

On January 13, 2023, Garrett agreed to a one-year, $2.65 million contract with the Royals, avoiding salary arbitration. He pitched in 27 games out of the bullpen for Kansas City, registering a 3.33 ERA with 28 strikeouts in 24 1/3 innings pitched. On July 9, he was designated for assignment by Kansas City after Ryan Yarbrough was activated from the injured list. Garrett was released by the Royals on July 15.

=== Cleveland Guardians ===
On July 25, 2023, Garrett signed a minor league contract with the Cleveland Guardians organization. In 5 games for the Triple–A Columbus Clippers, he posted a 5.79 ERA with 4 strikeouts in 4 2/3 innings pitched. On August 24, Garrett requested and was granted his release by the Guardians.

=== Los Angeles Angels ===
On February 12, 2024, Garrett signed a minor league contract with the San Francisco Giants. He was released by the Giants on March 21 after being informed he would not make the Opening Day roster.

On March 27, 2024, Garrett signed a minor league contract with the Los Angeles Angels. In 8 games for the Triple–A Salt Lake Bees, he logged a 2.45 ERA with 10 strikeouts. On April 30, the Angels selected Garrett's contract, adding him to the major league roster. In 6 games for Los Angeles, he recorded a 5.06 ERA with 11 strikeouts across 5 1/3 innings pitched. On May 15, Garrett was designated for assignment by the Angels. He elected free agency on May 19. Garrett re–signed with the Angels on a minor league contract on May 22. He was released by the Angels organization on August 13.

=== Toronto Blue Jays ===
On February 16, 2025, Garrett signed a minor league contract with the Toronto Blue Jays. He made 10 appearances split between the rookie-level Florida Complex League Blue Jays, Single-A Dunedin Blue Jays, and Triple-A Buffalo Bisons, accumulating an 0–1 record and 7.36 ERA with 14 strikeouts and one save over 11 innings of work. Garrett was released by the Blue Jays organization on August 1.

=== Charros de Jalisco ===
On February 24, 2026, Garrett signed with the Charros de Jalisco of the Mexican League. In four relief appearances for the team, he allowed four earned runs in 2 1/3 innings pitched (15.43 ERA). On June 23, Garrett was released by Jalisco.

== Personal life ==
Garrett and his wife, Tausana, were engaged in 2018. They currently reside in Las Vegas, Nevada as of 2025.

== See also ==
- List of multi-sport athletes
