= Barrett Astin =

American baseball pitcher (born 1991)

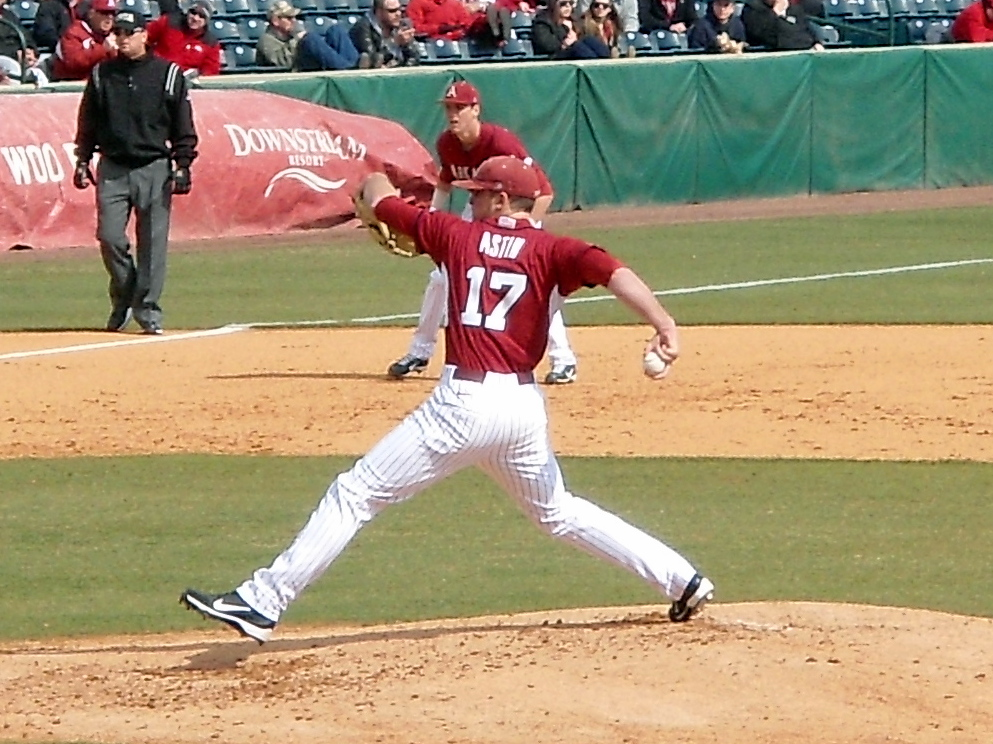
- Astin with the Arkansas Razorbacks
- Pitcher
- Born: October 22, 1991 (age 34); Forrest City, Arkansas, U.S.
- Batted: Right Threw: Right

MLB debut
- April 3, 2017, for the Cincinnati Reds

Last MLB appearance
- May 14, 2017, for the Cincinnati Reds

MLB statistics
- Win–loss record: 0-0
- Earned run average: 6.75
- Strikeouts: 2
- Stats at Baseball Reference

Teams
- Cincinnati Reds (2017)

Barrett Astin (born October 22, 1991) is an American former professional baseball pitcher. He played in Major League Baseball (MLB) for the Cincinnati Reds.

== Career ==
=== Amateur ===
Astin attended Forrest City High School in Forrest City, Arkansas, and played college baseball at the University of Arkansas. In 2011 and 2012, he played collegiate summer baseball with the Wareham Gatemen of the Cape Cod Baseball League.

=== Milwaukee Brewers ===
Astin was drafted by the Milwaukee Brewers in the third round, with the 90th overall selection, of the 2013 Major League Baseball draft and signed.

After signing, Astin made his professional debut with the rookie-level Helena Brewers and spent the whole season there, going 1–1 with a 4.30 ERA and 31 strikeouts in 37 2/3 innings pitched. In 2014, he played for the Single-A Wisconsin Timber Rattlers where he compiled an 8–7 record and 4.96 ERA with 81 strikeouts across 27 games (18 starts).

=== Cincinnati Reds ===
On September 10, 2014, the Brewers traded Astin and Kevin Shackelford to the Cincinnati Reds to complete an earlier trade for Jonathan Broxton. In 2015, he pitched with the Daytona Tortugas and Pensacola Blue Wahoos where he pitched to an 8–9 record with a 3.98 ERA and 1.35 WHIP in 30 games (25 starts), and in 2016, he played for Pensacola where he was 9–3 with a 2.26 ERA and a 0.96 WHIP in 37 games (11 starts).

On November 18, 2016, the Reds added Astin to their 40-man roster to protect him from the Rule 5 draft. Astin made the Reds' Opening Day roster for the 2017 season and he made his debut on Opening Day. He was optioned back and forth between Cincinnati and Louisville multiple times during April and May. He was optioned to Louisville on May 18 and he spent the remainder of the season there. In eight innings over six games for the Reds, Astin compiled a 6.75 ERA with two strikeouts, and in 26 games for Louisville, he was 3–4 with a 6.10 ERA. On September 12, Astin was designated for assignment following the promotions of Deck McGuire and Keury Mella. He cleared waivers and was sent outright to Triple-A Louisville on September 18.

Astin began the 2018 season with Triple-A Louisville, recording a 4.70 ERA with five strikeouts across five appearances. Astin was released by the Reds organization on April 20, 2018.

=== Kansas City T-Bones ===
On May 22, 2018, Astin signed with the Kansas City T-Bones of the independent American Association of Independent Professional Baseball. He made 19 appearances (18 starts) for the T-Bones during the year, registering a 10-3 record and 5.80 ERA with 69 strikeouts across 102 1/3 innings pitched. Astin was released by Kansas City on March 4, 2019.
