= Rookie Davis =

American baseball player (born 1993)

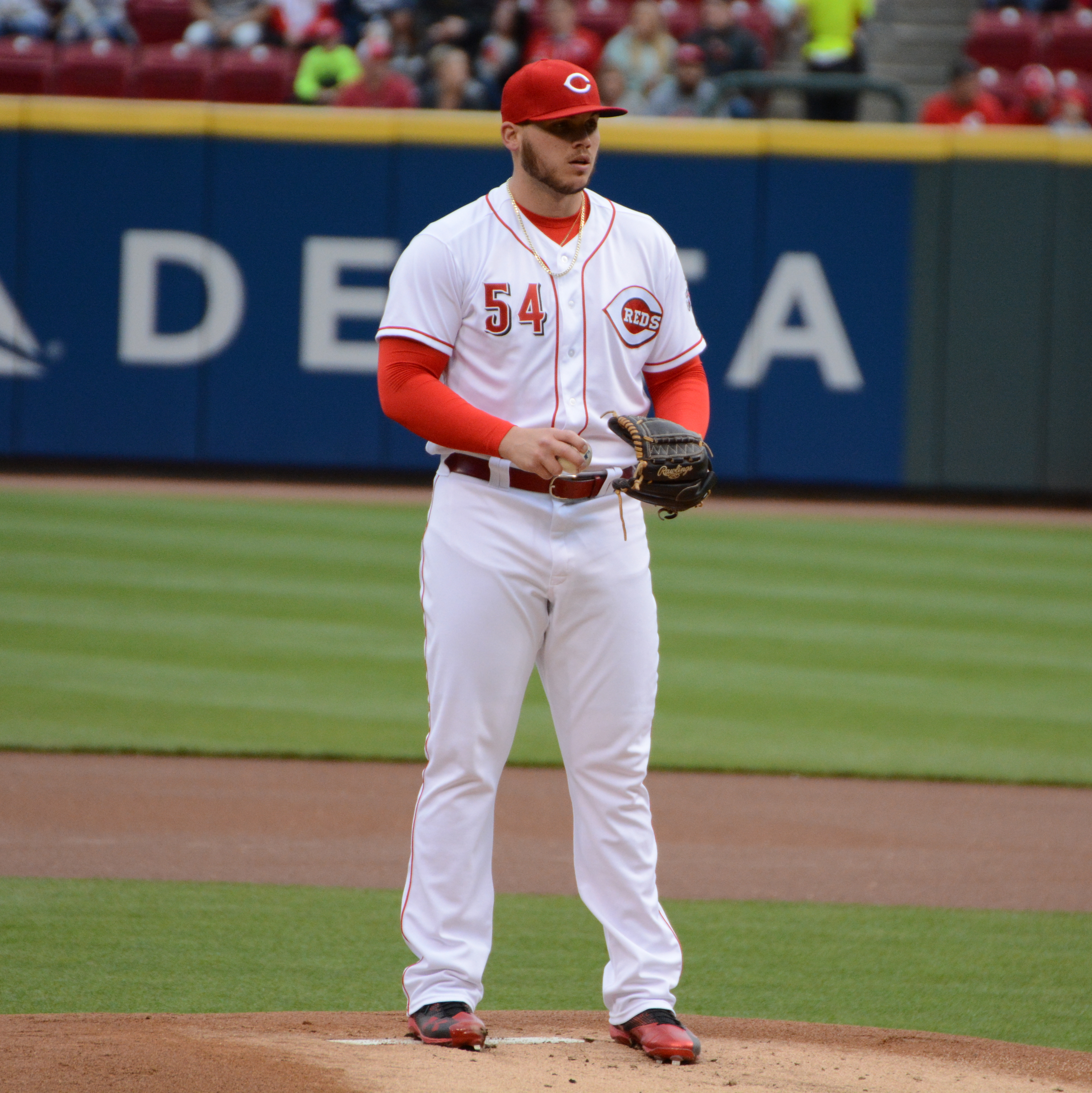
- Davis with the Cincinnati Reds
- Pitcher
- Born: April 29, 1993 (age 33); Sneads Ferry, North Carolina, U.S.
- Batted: Right Threw: Right

MLB debut
- April 6, 2017, for the Cincinnati Reds

Last appearance
- June 7, 2019, for the Pittsburgh Pirates

MLB statistics
- Win–loss record: 1–4
- Earned run average: 8.05
- Strikeouts: 30
- Stats at Baseball Reference

Teams
- Cincinnati Reds (2017); Pittsburgh Pirates (2019)

William "Rookie" Theron Davis (born April 29, 1993) is an American former professional baseball pitcher. He played in Major League Baseball (MLB) for the Cincinnati Reds and Pittsburgh Pirates.

== Career ==
=== New York Yankees ===
Davis attended Dixon High School in Holly Ridge, North Carolina. As a 15-year-old in early 2009, he committed to play college baseball at East Carolina University. Davis was drafted by the New York Yankees in the 14th round of the 2011 Major League Baseball draft. He signed with the Yankees instead of attending East Carolina. He made his professional debut in 2012 with the Gulf Coast Yankees. In 2013, he pitched for the Staten Island Yankees and Charleston RiverDogs and spent 2014 with Charleston. He started 2015 with the Tampa Yankees before reaching Double-A. Baseball America and MLB Pipeline both ranked him as the organization's 10th best prospect at mid-season. The Yankees added him to their 40-man roster after the season.

=== Cincinnati Reds ===
On December 28, 2015, Davis was traded to the Reds with Caleb Cotham, Tony Renda, and Eric Jagielo in exchange for Aroldis Chapman. He started the 2016 season with the Double-A Pensacola Blue Wahoos before getting a promotion to Triple-A in August. Davis made the Reds' Opening Day roster in 2017 and made his major league debut on April 6 against the Philadelphia Phillies, allowing four runs in three innings. Davis picked up his first major league win on May 3, pitching 5 scoreless innings over the Pirates in a 7–2 win. He was sent back down to Triple-A Louisville on May 10. He returned to the majors in September following the end of the minor league season.

After the season, Davis underwent hip surgery. He was outrighted to Triple–A on August 27, 2018, after completing his rehab stint. Davis became a free agent at the conclusion of the season on November 2.

=== Pittsburgh Pirates ===
On February 18, 2019, Davis signed a minor league deal with the Pittsburgh Pirates and was invited to spring training. He was reassigned to Triple-A on March 26. His contract was purchased on May 25. Davis appeared in five games before landing on the Injured List on June 8 with a blister. He suffered a forearm injury while on rehab assignment and was later transferred to the 60-day injured list. On September 1, Davis was outrighted off the Pirates' roster and he elected free agency following the season.

== Personal life ==
Rookie got engaged to Allison Fisher on September 28, 2019. Davis' father, Billy, also attended Dixon High School, and played college baseball for Louisburg College. His older sisters, Lauren and Ayrien, both played softball and basketball at Dixon.
