= Tim Adleman =

American baseball player (born 1987)

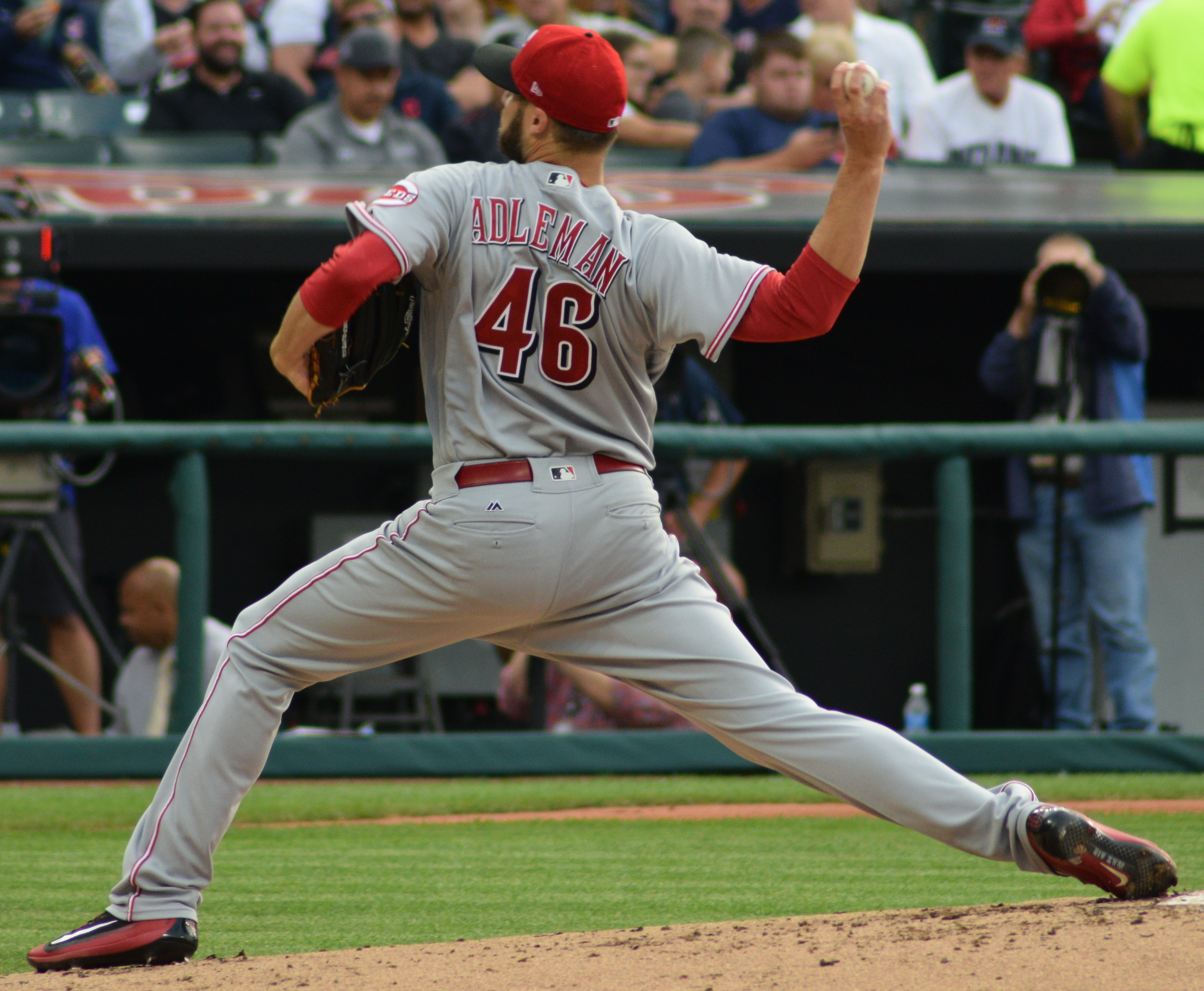
- Adleman with the Cincinnati Reds in 2017
- Pitcher
- Born: November 13, 1987 (age 38); Staten Island, New York, U.S.
- Batted: Right Threw: Right

Professional debut
- MLB: May 1, 2016, for the Cincinnati Reds
- KBO: March 25, 2018, for the Samsung Lions

Last appearance
- MLB: September 19, 2017, for the Cincinnati Reds
- KBO: October 13, 2018, for the Samsung Lions

MLB statistics
- Win–loss record: 9–15
- Earned run average: 4.97
- Strikeouts: 155

KBO statistics
- Win–loss record: 8–12
- Earned run average: 5.05
- Strikeouts: 137
- Stats at Baseball Reference

Teams
- Cincinnati Reds (2016–2017); Samsung Lions (2018)

Timothy Max Adleman (born November 13, 1987) is an American former professional baseball pitcher. He played in Major League Baseball (MLB) for the Cincinnati Reds and in the KBO League for the Samsung Lions.

== Career ==
=== Baltimore Orioles ===
Adleman played college baseball at Georgetown University. He was drafted by the Baltimore Orioles in the 24th round of the 2010 Major League Baseball draft. He made his professional debut for the Low–A Aberdeen IronBirds. In 2011, Adleman played for the Single-A Delmarva Shorebirds, pitching to a 5–7 record and 6.01 ERA with 72 strikeouts in 28 games. On March 27, 2012, Adleman was released by the Orioles organization.

=== Lincoln Saltdogs ===
After his release, Adleman signed with the Lincoln Saltdogs of the American Association of Independent Professional Baseball. He appeared in 5 games for Lincoln, allowing 3 runs in 7.0 innings of work.

=== El Paso Diablos ===
On June 18, 2012, Adleman was traded to the El Paso Diablos, also of the American Association. In 29 games for El Paso, Adleman registered a 5.94 ERA with 30 strikeouts.

=== New Jersey Jackals ===
In 2013, Adleman signed with the New Jersey Jackals of the Canadian-American Association of Professional Baseball. Adleman pitched to a 1.46 ERA in 40 games for the Jackals, also notching 62 strikeouts.

=== Cincinnati Reds ===
On October 14, 2013, Adleman signed a minor league contract with the Cincinnati Reds organization. In 2014, Adleman split the year between the Single-A Bakersfield Blaze and Double-A Pensacola Blue Wahoos, registering a cumulative 3–9 record and 3.72 ERA in 38 games. In 2015, he spent the season in Double-A with Pensacola, pitching to a 9–10 record and 2.64 ERA with 113.0 strikeouts in 150.0 innings of work. Adleman was assigned to the Triple-A Louisville Bats to begin the 2016 season.

After recording a 2.38 ERA in 10 Triple-A games, Adleman was called up to make his major league debut on May 1, 2016. He pitched 6 plus innings with 6 SOs and allowing only 3 hits and 2 runs against the Pittsburgh Pirates. On the year, Adleman registered a 4.00 ERA in 13 games. In 2017, Adleman spent the entire season in the majors, aside from 1 game in Louisville, pitching to a 5–11 record and 5.52 ERA in 30 appearances. On November 30, 2017, Adleman was released by the Reds to pursue an opportunity in Korea.

=== Samsung Lions ===
On November 30, 2017, Adleman signed a one-year, $1.05 million contract with the Samsung Lions of the KBO League. In 2018 for Samsung, Adleman pitched to an 8–12 record and 5.05 ERA across 31 appearances. He became a free agent after the season.

=== Long Island Ducks ===
On January 23, 2019, Adleman signed a minor league deal with the Cincinnati Reds organization that included an invitation to major league spring training. He was released by the Reds on March 22.

On April 11, 2019, Adleman signed with the Long Island Ducks of the Atlantic League of Professional Baseball. Adleman recorded a 1.64 ERA in 3 appearances for the Ducks.

=== Detroit Tigers ===
On May 11, 2019, Adleman's contract was purchased by the Detroit Tigers and he was assigned to the Triple-A Toledo Mud Hens. Adleman pitched to a 9–4 record with a 3.32 ERA, which would have been best in the International League had he qualified for the pitching statistic leaderboard. He struck out 119 batters and finished the season with a 1.15 WHIP. He became a minor league free agent on November 4.

On November 5, 2019, Adleman re–signed with the Tigers on a minor league contract. He was invited to spring training for the 2020 season. Adleman did not play in a game in 2020 due to the cancellation of the Minor League Baseball season because of the COVID-19 pandemic. He became a free agent on November 2, 2020.

=== Cincinnati Reds (second stint) ===
On April 30, 2021, Adleman signed a minor league contract with the Cincinnati Reds organization. He made 31 appearances for the Triple-A Louisville Bats, posting a 3.80 ERA with 41 strikeouts across 45 innings of work.

=== New York Mets ===
On March 16, 2022, Adleman signed a minor league contract with the New York Mets. In 17 games for the Triple–A Syracuse Mets, he struggled to a 6.04 ERA with 39 strikeouts across 44 2/3 innings of work. Adleman was released by the Mets organization on August 10.

In May 2023, Adleman joined Firebrand Sports Media as a sports streaming and sponsorship sales executive.
