= Lisalverto Bonilla =

Dominican baseball player (born 1990)

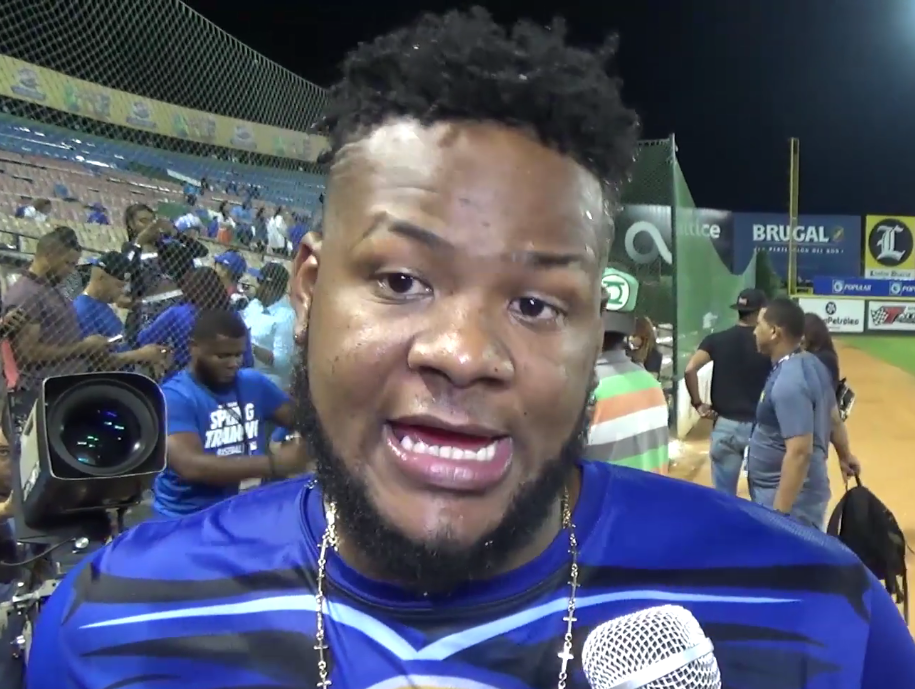
- Bonilla with Tigres del Licey in 2020

Free agent
- Pitcher
- Born: June 18, 1990 (age 36); Samaná, Dominican Republic
- Bats: Switch Throws: Right

Professional debut
- MLB: September 4, 2014, for the Texas Rangers
- KBO: March 27, 2018, for the Samsung Lions
- CPBL: April 15, 2020, for the Rakuten Monkeys

MLB statistics (through 2017 season)
- Win–loss record: 4–3
- Earned run average: 6.28
- Strikeouts: 45

KBO statistics (through 2018 season)
- Win–loss record: 7–10
- Earned run average: 5.30
- Strikeouts: 151

CPBL statistics (through 2021 season)
- Win–loss record: 12–11
- Earned run average: 5.00
- Strikeouts: 153
- Stats at Baseball Reference

Teams
- Texas Rangers (2014); Cincinnati Reds (2017); Samsung Lions (2018); Rakuten Monkeys (2020); Uni-President Lions (2021)

Lisalverto Bonilla (born June 18, 1990) is a Dominican professional baseball pitcher who is a free agent. He has previously played in Major League Baseball (MLB) for the Texas Rangers and Cincinnati Reds, in the KBO League for the Samsung Lions, and in the Chinese Professional Baseball League (CPBL) for the Rakuten Monkeys and Uni-President Lions.

== Career ==
=== Philadelphia Phillies ===
Bonilla signed as an international free agent with the Philadelphia Phillies in 2008. He was named to appear in the All-Star Futures Game in 2012, but was unable to play due to a thumb injury.

=== Texas Rangers ===
On December 9, 2012, the Phillies traded Bonilla to the Texas Rangers with Josh Lindblom for Michael Young.

The Rangers promoted Bonilla to the major leagues on September 2, 2014. He made his major league debut on September 4, pitching three innings against the Seattle Mariners, and allowing two hits. Bonilla started the 2015 season on the 15-day disabled list due to shoulder impingement. On April 11, it was announced Bonilla had also suffered an elbow injury. He was moved to the 60-day disabled list.

=== Los Angeles Dodgers ===
On October 21, 2015, Bonilla was claimed off waivers by the Los Angeles Dodgers. However, they chose to non-tender him on December 2, making him a free agent. The Dodgers later re-signed him to a minor league contract with a spring training invitation and he was assigned to the Triple-A Oklahoma City Dodgers to begin the season. He pitched in 24 games for Oklahoma City and seven for the Tulsa Drillers in 2016. He was 5–7 in the 31 games and made 13 starts. His combined ERA was 3.97. Bonilla elected free agency following the season on November 7, 2016.

=== Pittsburgh Pirates ===
On November 29, 2016, Bonilla signed with the Pittsburgh Pirates for one-year at the major league minimum $575,000. On February 9, 2017, with the Pirates looking to clear a spot on the 40-man roster, Bonilla was designated for assignment.

=== Cincinnati Reds ===
On February 13, 2017, Bonilla was claimed off waivers by the Cincinnati Reds. He was called up to the Reds on April 18 and made his Reds debut on April 22, pitching 5 innings in relief, surrendering 4 runs on 3 hits, 3 walks, and 6 strikeouts in a 12–8 loss to the Chicago Cubs. He and was optioned back to Triple-A Louisville the next day. Bonilla was released by the Reds on September 1.

=== Cleveland Indians ===
On December 18, 2017, Bonilla signed a minor league contract with the Cleveland Indians. The deal included an invitation to spring training.

=== Samsung Lions ===
On February 16, 2018, Bonilla was released by the Indians to sign with the Samsung Lions of the KBO. He became a free agent following the 2018 season.

=== Tigres de Quintana Roo ===
On April 21, 2019, Bonilla signed with the Tigres de Quintana Roo of the Mexican League. In 4 games (2 starts), he went 0–0 with a 4.09 ERA and 9 strikeouts in 11 innings.

=== Rakuten Monkeys ===
On February 17, 2020, Bonilla signed with the Rakuten Monkeys of the Chinese Professional Baseball League. He became a free agent following the season.

=== Uni-President Lions ===
On July 26, 2021, Bonilla signed with the Uni-President Lions of the Chinese Professional Baseball League (CPBL). He became a free agent following the season.

=== Pericos de Puebla ===
On February 1, 2022, Bonilla signed with the Pericos de Puebla of the Mexican League. In five starts for Puebla, he logged a 1–0 record and 8.14 ERQ with 14 strikeouts across 21 innings pitched. Bonilla was released by the Pericos on May 19.

=== El Águila de Veracruz ===
On June 22, 2022, Bonilla signed with El Águila de Veracruz of the Mexican League. He made 8 starts for Veracruz down the stretch, posting a 1–5 record and 4.91 ERA with 30 strikeouts in 33 innings pitched. Bonilla was released by the team on January 19, 2023.

=== Bravos de León ===
On March 13, 2025, after two years of inactivity, Bonilla signed with the Leones de Yucatán of the Mexican League. However, he did not appear in a game for Yucatán. On May 10, Bonilla signed with the Bravos de León. In four appearances for León, he struggled to an 11.00 ERA with four strikeouts over nine innings pitched. He was released on May 29.

=== Centauros de La Guaira ===
In June 2025, Bonilla signed with the Centauros de La Guaira of the Venezuelan Major League. He became a free agent following the season.
