= Alejandro Chacín =

Venezuelan baseball player (born 1993)

- Pitcher
- Born: June 24, 1993 (age 33); Maracay, Venezuela
- Batted: Right Threw: Right

MLB debut
- August 23, 2017, for the Cincinnati Reds

Last MLB appearance
- September 20, 2017, for the Cincinnati Reds

MLB statistics
- Win–loss record: 0–0
- Earned run average: 10.50
- Strikeouts: 6
- Stats at Baseball Reference

Teams
- Cincinnati Reds (2017)

Alejandro Chacín (born June 24, 1993) is a Venezuelan former professional baseball pitcher. He played in Major League Baseball (MLB) for the Cincinnati Reds.

== Career ==
=== Cincinnati Reds ===
On February 23, 2010, Chacín signed a minor league contract with the Cincinnati Reds organization. In 2011 and 2012, Chacín played for the rookie-level Arizona League Reds and Billings Mustangs. Chacín spent the 2013, 2014, and 2015 seasons with the Single-A Dayton Dragons, also spending part of 2015 with the Advanced Single-A Daytona Tortugas. He spent the 2016 season with the Double-A Pensacola Blue Wahoos, and was invited to spring training for the 2017 season.

Chacín was assigned to the Triple-A Louisville Bats to begin the season, and was called up to the majors for the first time on August 23, 2017. In six appearances for the Reds during his rookie campaign, Chacín struggled to a 10.50 ERA with six strikeouts over six innings of work. On October 4, 2017, Chacín was removed from the 40-man roster and sent outright to Triple-A Louisville. He elected free agency two days later.

Chacín signed with the Sugar Land Skeeters of the Atlantic League of Professional Baseball in early 2018. His contract was purchased by the Reds on May 23, 2018. In 27 relief outings for Double–A Pensacola, Chacín logged a 5.50 ERA with 50 strikeouts and 6 saves across 36 innings pitched. He elected free agency following the season on November 2.

=== Lancaster Barnstormers ===
On March 13, 2019, Chacín was traded to the Lancaster Barnstormers of the Atlantic League of Professional Baseball in exchange for Kevin Munson and Stephen Johnson. In 41 appearances for Lancaster, he compiled a 1-4 record and 5.50 ERA with 52 strikeouts and 38 walks across 55 2/3 innings pitched. Chacín became a free agent following the season.

=== Southern Illinois Miners ===
On March 11, 2020, Chacín signed with the Southern Illinois Miners of the Frontier League.

=== Wild Health Genomes ===
On June 2, 2022, Chacín signed with the Wild Health Genomes of the Atlantic League of Professional Baseball. In 31 appearances for the Genomes, he compiled a 2-1 record and 3.03 ERA with 38 strikeouts across 29 2/3 innings pitched. Chacín became a free agent after the season.

=== Charleston Dirty Birds ===
On February 24, 2025, Chacín signed with the Charleston Dirty Birds of the Atlantic League of Professional Baseball. He was released prior to the start of the season.

=== Guerreros de Lara ===
On May 11, 2025, Chacín signed with the Guerreros de Lara of the Venezuelan Major League.
