= Kevin Shackelford =

American baseball player (born 1989)

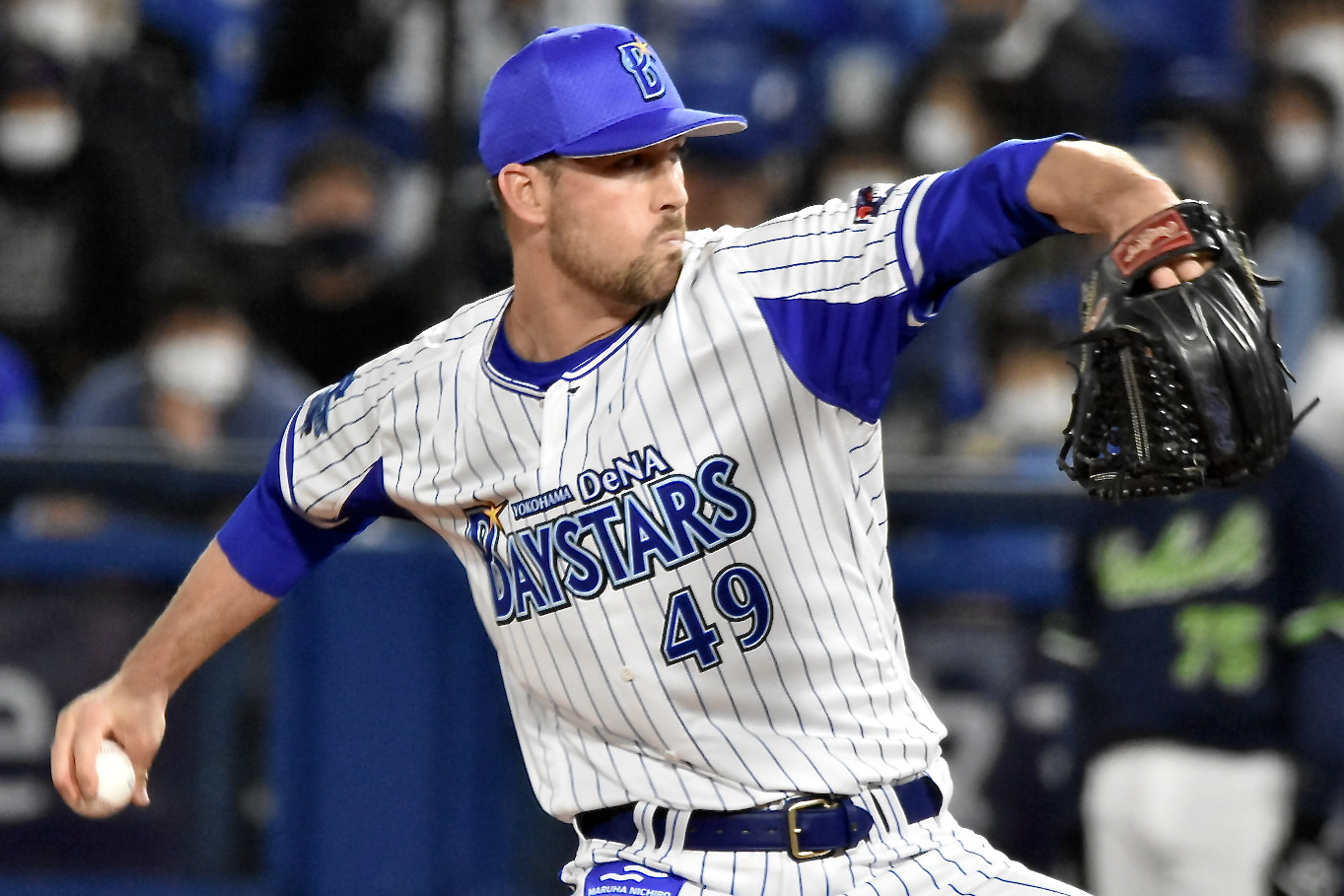
- Shackelford with the Yokohama DeNA Baystars
- Pitcher
- Born: April 7, 1989 (age 37); Charlotte, North Carolina, U.S.
- Batted: Right Threw: Right

Professional debut
- MLB: June 29, 2017, for the Cincinnati Reds
- NPB: April 23, 2021, for the Yokohama DeNA BayStars

Last appearance
- MLB: May 19, 2018, for the Cincinnati Reds
- NPB: October 28, 2021, for the Yokohama DeNA BayStars

MLB statistics
- Win–loss record: 0–1
- Earned run average: 5.35
- Strikeouts: 45

NPB statistics
- Win–loss record: 2-1
- Earned run average: 3.80
- Strikeouts: 47
- Stats at Baseball Reference

Teams
- Cincinnati Reds (2017–2018); Yokohama DeNA BayStars (2021)

Kevin Russell Shackelford (born April 7, 1989) is an American former professional baseball pitcher. He played in Major League Baseball (MLB) for the Cincinnati Reds, and in Nippon Professional Baseball (NPB) for the Yokohama DeNA BayStars.

== College ==
Shackelford attended Marshall University, where he played college baseball for the Marshall Thundering Herd. He played as a catcher for his first two seasons at Marshall, batting .095/.156/.119 in 2008, and hitting .226/.280/.321 in 2009. He then became a pitcher. In 2010 he was 1–1 with a 7.50 ERA in 19 games.

== Career ==
=== Milwaukee Brewers ===
The Milwaukee Brewers selected Shackelford in the 21st round of the 2010 MLB draft. He signed and made his professional debut with the AZL Brewers of the Arizona League in 2010, and went 1–2 with a 5.40 ERA. The next season for the Helena Brewers in the Advanced Rookie Pioneer League, he was 3–5 with a 4.15 ERA.

Playing for the Wisconsin Timber Rattlers of the Class A Midwest League in 2012, the Timber Rattlers won the Midwest League championship, with Shackelford logging a 4.06 ERA in 27 appearances. In 2013, Shackelford split the season between the High-A Brevard County Manatees of the Florida State League and the Double-A Huntsville Stars of the Southern League, posting a 2–4 record and 3.08 ERA in 44 games between the two teams. After the 2013 season, the Brewers assigned Shackelford to the Arizona Fall League, where he was a member of the championship-winning Surprise Saguaros. On November 20, 2013, the Brewers added Shackelford to their 40-man roster. Shackelford was assigned to Huntsville to begin the 2014 season. He was designated for assignment on July 17, 2014, to make room on the 40-man roster for Irving Falu, without having appeared in a major league game for Milwaukee. He was outrighted to Huntsville on July 19.

=== Cincinnati Reds ===
After the 2014 season, the Brewers traded Shackelford alongside Barrett Astin to the Cincinnati Reds to complete an August 31 trade for Jonathan Broxton. In 2015, Shackelford spent the year with the Double-A Pensacola Blue Wahoos, logging a 2–4 record and 3.72 ERA in 35 appearances. In 2016, he split the season between Pensacola and the Triple-A Louisville Bats, accumulating a 2–2 record and 2.03 ERA in 35 games between the two teams. Shackelford elected free agency following the season on November 7, 2016. On November 21, Shackelford re–signed with the Reds organization on a new minor league contract. He was assigned to Louisville to begin the 2017 season.

The Reds promoted Shackelford to the major leagues for the first time on June 27, 2017. He made his major league debut on June 29 allowing 4 earned runs in 2 2/3 innings against his former team, the Milwaukee Brewers. In 26 games in his rookie year for the Reds, Shackelford was 0–0 with a 4.70 ERA. Shackelford appeared in 5 games for Cincinnati in 2018, but struggled to a 7.88 ERA in 8 innings of work. The Reds released Shackelford on June 5, 2018.

=== Yokohama DeNA BayStars ===
On November 21, 2020, after spending two and a half years out of baseball, Shackelford a one-year contract with the Yokohama DeNA BayStars of Nippon Professional Baseball as a developmental squad player (ja:育成選手制度 (日本プロ野球)). On April 23, 2021, Shackelford signed a contract with the BayStars as a registered player under management. (Ja:支配下選手登録) On April 24, he made his NPB debut. He became a free agent following the season.
