= Keury Mella =

Dominican baseball player (born 1993)

Free agent
- Pitcher
- Born: August 2, 1993 (age 33); Bonao, Monseñor Nouel, Dominican Republic
- Bats: Right Throws: Right

Professional debut
- MLB: September 20, 2017, for the Cincinnati Reds
- CPBL: April 23, 2022, for the Uni-President Lions

MLB statistics (through 2021 season)
- Win–loss record: 2–0
- Earned run average: 7.22
- Strikeouts: 25

CPBL statistics (through 2022 season)
- Win–loss record: 2–8
- Earned run average: 4.26
- Strikeouts: 51
- Stats at Baseball Reference

Teams
- Cincinnati Reds (2017–2019); Arizona Diamondbacks (2020–2021); Uni-President Lions (2022)

Keury Mella (born August 2, 1993) is a Dominican professional baseball pitcher who is a free agent. He has previously played in Major League Baseball (MLB) for the Cincinnati Reds and Arizona Diamondbacks, and in the Chinese Professional Baseball League (CPBL) for the Uni-President Lions.

== Career ==
=== San Francisco Giants ===
Mella signed with the San Francisco Giants organization as an international free agent on May 31, 2012. He made his professional debut in 2012 with the Dominican Summer League Giants, recording a 3–3 record and 2.47 ERA in 14 appearances. Mella played the 2013 season with the rookie-level Arizona League Giants, logging a 3–2 record and 2.25 ERA in 10 games. He split the 2014 season between the Single-A Augusta GreenJackets and the Low-A Salem-Keizer Volcanoes, pitching to a cumulative 4–4 record and 3.45 ERA with 83 strikeouts in 86 innings of work. He was assigned to the High-A San Jose Giants to begin the 2015 season.

=== Cincinnati Reds ===
On July 30, 2015, the Giants traded Mella and Adam Duvall to the Cincinnati Reds in exchange for Mike Leake. He finished the year with the High-A Daytona Tortugas, logging a 3–1 record and 2.95 ERA in 4 games with the team. In 2016, Mella split the year between Daytona and the Triple-A Louisville Bats, posting a 9–9 record and 3.76 ERA with 101 strikeouts in 138 2/3 innings pitched.

On November 19, 2016, the Reds added Mella to their 40-man roster to protect him from the Rule 5 draft. He split the majority of the 2017 season between the Double-A Pensacola Blue Wahoos and Louisville, accumulating a 9–4 record and 3.00 ERA in 21 games. On September 12, 2017, Mella was promoted to the major leagues for the first time. He made his MLB debut on September 20, pitching 2 innings of 2-run ball against the St. Louis Cardinals. He finished his rookie season with a 6.75 ERA across 2 appearances for Cincinnati. In 2018, Mella spent the majority of the year in the minors, and pitched in four big league games for the Reds, stumbling to an 8.68 ERA in four games. Mella played in Louisville for the majority of the 2019 season, and allowed three runs in 3 2/3 innings of work in two major league games. On November 4, 2019, Mella was outrighted off of the 40-man roster and elected free agency.

=== Arizona Diamondbacks ===
On November 8, 2019, Mella signed a minor league contract with the Arizona Diamondbacks organization, and was invited to major league Spring Training. On September 1, 2020, the Diamondbacks selected Mella's contract to the active roster. In 11 games for the Diamondbacks in 2020, Mella pitched to a 1.80 ERA with 10 strikeouts over 10 innings pitched. On February 26, 2021, Mella was designated for assignment after the signing of Tyler Clippard was made official. On March 1, Mella was outrighted and invited to Spring Training as a non-roster invitee. After recording a 3.86 ERA in 11 games for the Triple-A Reno Aces to begin the year, Mella was selected to the active roster on June 15. In 2 games for Arizona, Mella struggled tremendously, allowing 6 earned runs in 1.2 innings to the tune of a 32.40 ERA. He was designated for assignment on June 18. On July 28, Mella was released by the Diamondbacks.

=== Pittsburgh Pirates ===
On August 3, Mella signed a minor league contract with the Pittsburgh Pirates. He was assigned to the Triple-A Indianapolis Indians. Mella made 16 appearances for the Triple-A Indianapolis Indians, going 2–0 with a 7.11 ERA and 23 strikeouts. On October 13, Mella elected free agency.

=== Uni-President Lions ===
On January 14, 2022, Mella signed with the Uni-President Lions of the Chinese Professional Baseball League. He posted a 2–8 record with a 4.26 ERA in 11 starts. Mella was not re-signed following the season and became a free agent.

=== Sultanes de Monterrey ===
On March 4, 2023, Mella signed with the Sultanes de Monterrey of the Mexican League. In 28 games for Monterrey, he posted a 1–1 record and 2.51 ERA with 16 strikeouts and 6 saves across 28 2/3 innings pitched.

In 2024, Mella returned for a second season with Monterrey. He compiled a 3–1 record and 4.55 ERA with more walks (17) than strikeouts (7) over 33 appearances. Mella was released on by the Sultanes on October 1, 2024.

=== Olmecas de Tabasco ===
On June 1, 2025, Mella signed with the Olmecas de Tabasco of the Mexican League. In 19 appearances for Tabasco, he struggled to an 0–4 record and 8.80 ERA with 12 strikeouts across 15 1/3 innings pitched. Mella was released by the Olmecas on July 25.
