= Deck McGuire =

American baseball player (born 1989)

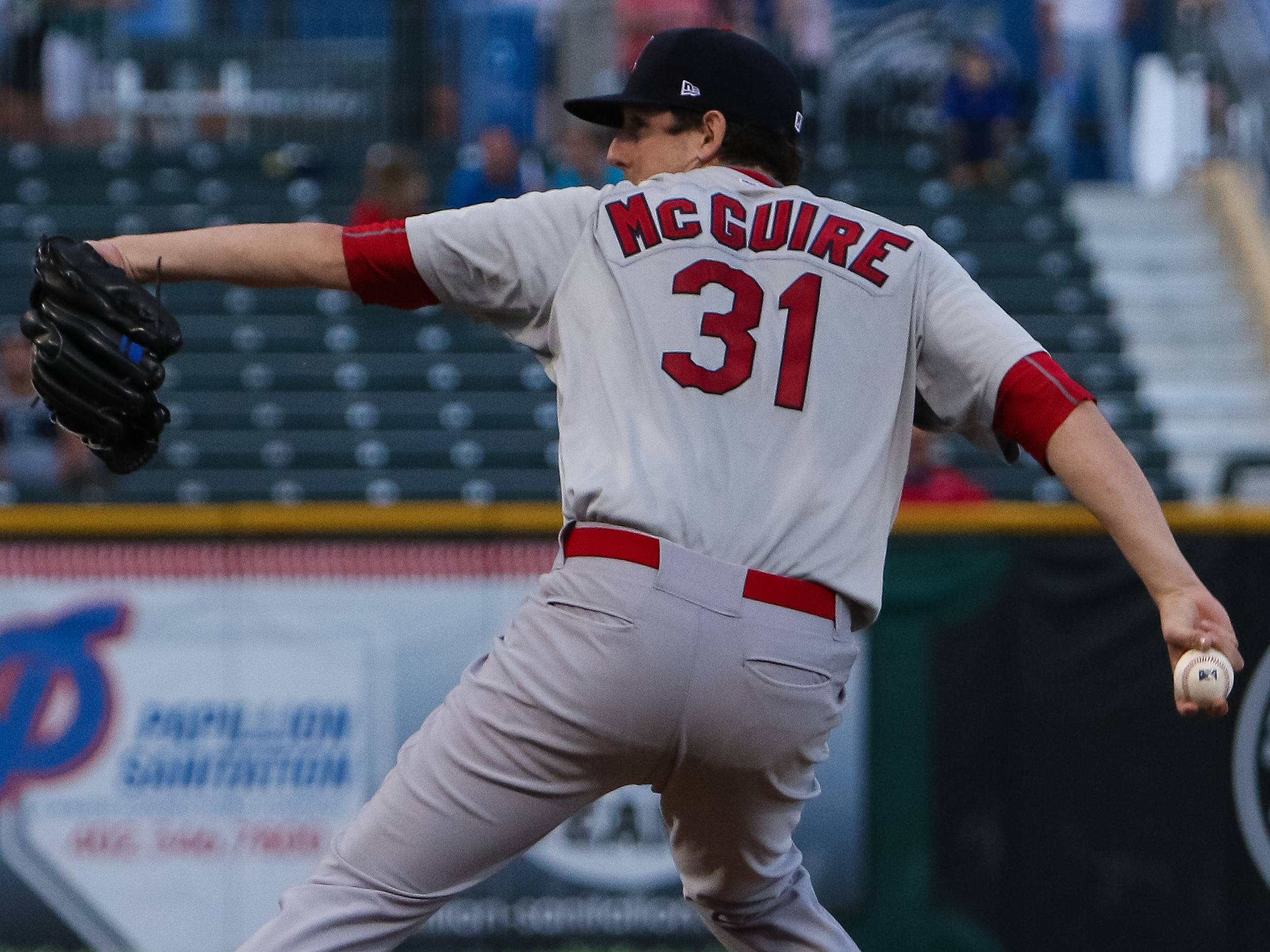
- McGuire with the Memphis Redbirds in 2016
- Pitcher
- Born: June 23, 1989 (age 37); Richmond, Virginia, U.S.
- Batted: Right Threw: Right

Professional debut
- MLB: September 12, 2017, for the Cincinnati Reds
- KBO: March 23, 2019, for the Samsung Lions
- CPBL: April 20, 2021, for the Rakuten Monkeys

Last appearance
- MLB: September 29, 2018, for the Los Angeles Angels
- KBO: August 1, 2019, for the Samsung Lions
- CPBL: August 25, 2021, for the Rakuten Monkeys

MLB statistics
- Win–loss record: 1–3
- Earned run average: 5.23
- Strikeouts: 44

KBO statistics
- Win–loss record: 4–8
- Earned run average: 5.05
- Strikeouts: 100

CPBL statistics
- Win–loss record: 1–3
- Earned run average: 6.00
- Strikeouts: 49
- Stats at Baseball Reference

Teams
- Cincinnati Reds (2017); Toronto Blue Jays (2018); Los Angeles Angels (2018); Samsung Lions (2019); Rakuten Monkeys (2021)

Career highlights and awards
- KBO: Pitched a no-hitter on April 21, 2019

William Deck McGuire (born June 23, 1989) is an American former professional baseball pitcher. He played college baseball for the Georgia Tech Yellow Jackets, and was named the Atlantic Coast Conference Baseball Pitcher of the Year in 2009. He played in Major League Baseball (MLB) for the Cincinnati Reds, Toronto Blue Jays, Los Angeles Angels, and Samsung Lions of the KBO League, and Rakuten Monkeys of the Chinese Professional Baseball League (CPBL).

== Playing career ==
=== Amateur career ===
McGuire graduated from Deep Run High School outside Richmond, Virginia. He attended the Georgia Institute of Technology and played college baseball for the Georgia Tech Yellow Jackets. While at Georgia Tech, McGuire was named to the 2009 All-America First Team by Collegiate Baseball, the 2009 All-America Second Team by Baseball America, the 2008 Freshman All-America First Team by Collegiate Baseball, and was the 2009 Atlantic Coast Conference's Pitcher of the Year.

=== Toronto Blue Jays ===
The Toronto Blue Jays selected McGuire in the first round of the 2010 Major League Baseball draft. He signed with the Jays for a $2 million signing bonus. He made his professional debut that season with the Dunedin Blue Jays of the Class A-Advanced Florida State League. In July 2011, he was promoted to the New Hampshire Fisher Cats of the Class AA Eastern League. McGuire was promoted from Dunedin, after posting a 7–4 record with 102 strikeouts and a 2.75 earned run average (ERA) over 19 appearances and 104 2/3 innings pitched.

On November 20, 2013, the Blue Jays added McGuire to their 40-man roster. On March 10, 2014, the Blue Jays optioned him to the Buffalo Bisons of the Class AAA International League. McGuire was designated for assignment on July 17, 2014, to make room for Brad Mills. He had posted a 5.56 ERA in his first trip to Triple-A.

=== Oakland Athletics ===
On July 24, 2014, the Blue Jays traded McGuire to the Oakland Athletics for cash considerations. He was optioned to the Sacramento River Cats of the Class AAA Pacific Coast League (PCL). When the Athletics acquired Adam Dunn on August 31, McGuire was designated for assignment and assigned outright to Sacramento. McGuire was released from the Athletics organization before the start of the 2015 season.

=== Los Angeles Dodgers ===
McGuire was subsequently signed to a minor league contract by the Los Angeles Dodgers and was assigned to the Tulsa Drillers of the Double-A Texas League to start the season. He pitched in 30 games (with 18 starts) between Tulsa and the Oklahoma City Dodgers of the PCL and was 9–6 with a 3.69 ERA.

=== St. Louis Cardinals ===
On November 26, 2015, McGuire signed a minor league contract with the St. Louis Cardinals. He began the 2016 season with the Triple–A Memphis Redbirds of the PCL, and also made one appearance for the Double–A Springfield Cardinals. In 26 starts for Memphis, McGuire registered a 7–11 record and 5.10 ERA with 111 strikeouts across 134 innings pitched. He elected free agency following the season on November 7, 2016.

=== Cincinnati Reds ===
On February 20, 2017, McGuire signed a minor league contract with the Cincinnati Reds. He pitched for the Pensacola Blue Wahoos of the Double–A Southern League. On September 12, the Reds promoted McGuire to the major leagues. He appeared in six games for the Reds in 2017, and pitched to a 1–1 record, 2.63 ERA, and 11 strikeouts in 13 2/3 innings. On November 3, McGuire was removed from the 40–man roster and sent outright to Triple-A. He elected free agency on November 6.

=== Toronto Blue Jays (second stint) ===
On November 16, 2017, McGuire signed a minor league contract with an invitation to spring training with the Toronto Blue Jays. On May 13, 2018, McGuire was brought up to the Blue Jays. He was designated for assignment on June 9.

=== Los Angeles Angels ===
On June 15, 2018, McGuire was claimed off waivers by the Texas Rangers and immediately optioned to Triple-A. Three days later, he was designated for assignment. On June 19, McGuire was traded to the Los Angeles Angels for cash considerations or a player to be named later. In 17 games, he collected an ERA of 6.07 in 29 2/3 innings. He elected free agency on November 2, 2018.

=== Samsung Lions ===
On November 29, 2018, McGuire signed a one-year, $950,000 contract with the Samsung Lions of the KBO League. On April 21, 2019, McGuire threw a no-hitter against the Hanwha Eagles, striking out 13 batters en route to a 16–0 win. McGuire was released by the Lions on August 7, 2019, following the signing of Ben Lively.

=== Tampa Bay Rays ===
On February 14, 2020, McGuire signed a minor league deal with the Tampa Bay Rays. He did not play in a game in 2020 due to the cancellation of the minor league season because of the COVID-19 pandemic. McGuire was released by the Rays organization on May 28.

=== Rakuten Monkeys ===
On December 30, 2020, McGuire signed with the Rakuten Monkeys of the Chinese Professional Baseball League. He made his CPBL debut on April 20, 2021. McGuire was released by the Monkeys on August 30, 2021.

=== Gastonia Honey Hunters ===
On March 31, 2022, McGuire signed with the Gastonia Honey Hunters of the Atlantic League of Professional Baseball. In 6 starts, McGuire posted a 5–0 record with a 1.91 ERA and 41 strikeouts over 37 2/3 innings.

=== Cincinnati Reds (second stint) ===
On May 25, 2022, McGuire's contract was purchased by the Cincinnati Reds organization. In 20 games (14 starts) for the Triple-A Louisville Bats, he posted a 4-5 record and 6.32 ERA with 60 strikeouts across 74 innings of work. McGuire elected free agency following the season on November 10.

McGuire announced his retirement from baseball on December 16, 2022.

== Coaching career ==
On October 11, 2023, McGuire was hired by the Georgia Institute of Technology to serve as an undergraduate assistant coach.
