= Ariel Hernández (baseball) =

Dominican baseball player (born 1992)

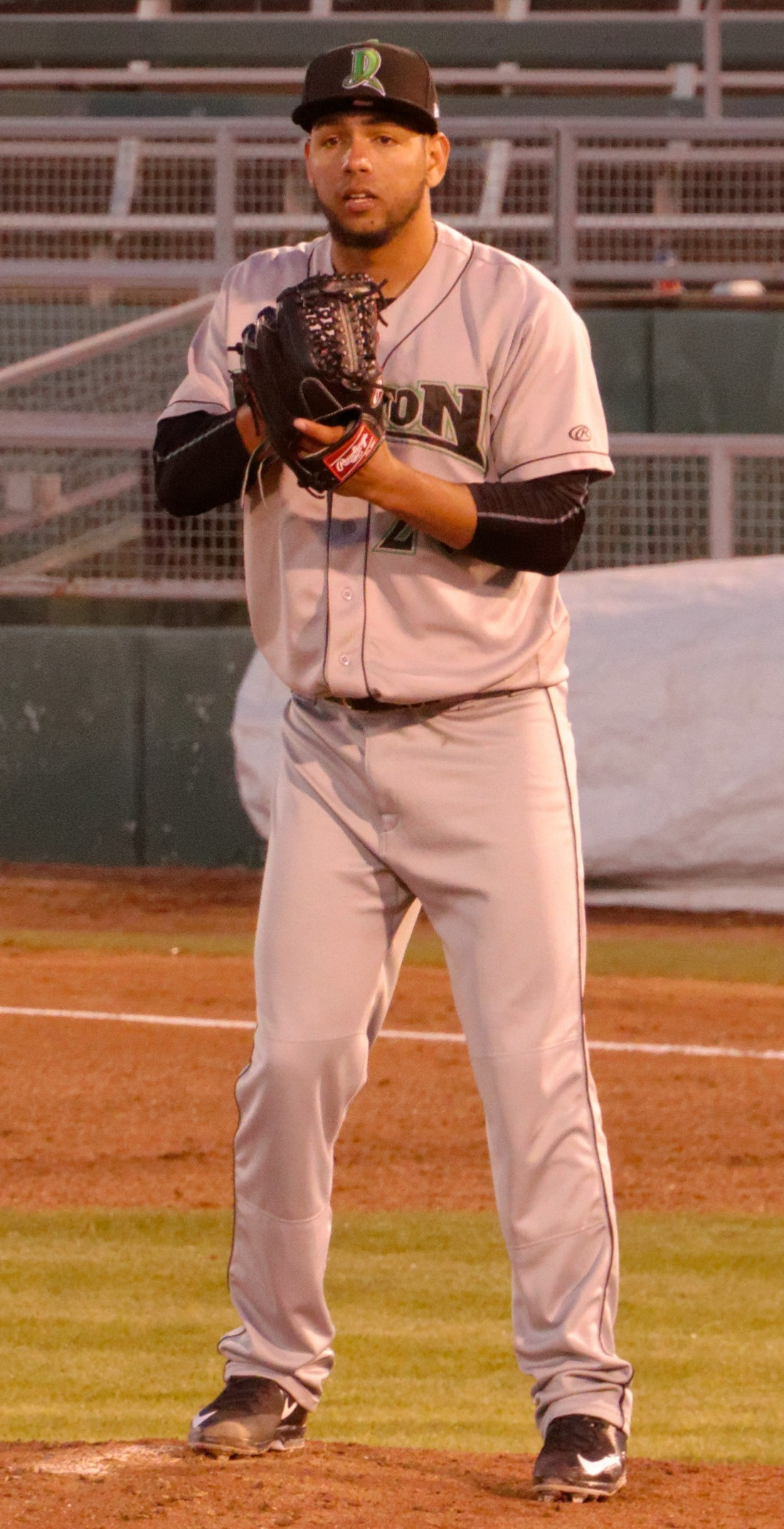
- Hernández with the Dayton Dragons in 2016

Free agent
- Pitcher
- Born: March 2, 1992 (age 34); Santo Domingo, Dominican Republic
- Bats: Right Throws: Right

MLB debut
- April 24, 2017, for the Cincinnati Reds

MLB statistics (through 2017 season)
- Win–loss record: 0–0
- Earned run average: 5.18
- Strikeouts: 29
- Stats at Baseball Reference

Teams
- Cincinnati Reds (2017)

Ariel Hernández (born March 2, 1992) is a Dominican professional baseball pitcher who is a free agent. He has previously played in Major League Baseball (MLB) for the Cincinnati Reds.

== Career ==
=== San Francisco Giants ===
Hernández signed with the San Francisco Giants as an international free agent on September 4, 2008. He made his professional debut in 2009 with the Dominican Summer League Giants, with whom he recorded a 6–1 record and 3.64 ERA in 13 games. He returned to the team in 2010, where he posted a 2.01 ERA in 9 appearances. For the 2011 season, Hernández played with the rookie-level Arizona League Giants, pitching to a 8.40 ERA with 15 strikeouts in as many innings pitched. The following year, Hernández returned to the team, logging a 4.50 ERA with 19 strikeouts in 11 appearances. In 2013, Hernández spent his third straight year with the AZL Giants, registering a n ugly 10.57 ERA in 10 appearances. Hernández missed the entire 2014 season due to a right shoulder strain and was released by the Giants organization on March 9, 2015.

=== Frontier Greys ===
On April 4, 2015, Hernández signed with the Frontier Greys of the independent Frontier League. Hernández made two appearances for the Greys in 2015, pitching two scoreless innings with five strikeouts.

=== Arizona Diamondbacks ===
On May 21, 2015, Hernández signed a minor league contract with the Arizona Diamondbacks organization. He was assigned to the Low-A Hillsboro Hops, where he recorded a 6.04 ERA with 32 strikeouts in 22 1/3 innings of work across 22 appearances.

=== Cincinnati Reds ===
On December 10, 2015, Hernández was selected with the 1st overall pick in the minor league phase of the Rule 5 draft by the Cincinnati Reds organization. He split the 2016 season between the Single-A Dayton Dragons and the High-A Daytona Tortugas, posting a cumulative 3–2 record and 2.18 ERA in 43 appearances. The Reds added Hernández to their 40-man roster after the 2016 season.

Hernández was promoted to the major leagues for the first time by the Reds on April 23, 2017. He made his major league debut the next day, pitching 2 2/3 perfect innings with five strikeouts in an 11–7 loss to the Milwaukee Brewers. He split his rookie season between the Double-A Pensacola Blue Wahoos, the Triple-A Louisville Bats, and the Reds, recording a 5.18 ERA in 19 big league games with Cincinnati. He was assigned to Double-A Pensacola to begin the 2018 season, and pitched 3 1/3 scoreless innings before he was designated for assignment on April 13, 2018.

=== Los Angeles Dodgers ===
On April 17, 2018, the Reds traded Hernández to the Los Angeles Dodgers in exchange for Zach Neal and Ibandel Isabel. He split time between the Double-A Tulsa Drillers and the Triple-A Oklahoma City Dodgers, posting a 4–2 record with 29 strikeouts between the two teams. On July 31, 2018, Hernández was designated for assignment by the Dodgers.

=== Milwaukee Brewers ===
On August 7, 2018, Hernández was claimed off waivers by the Milwaukee Brewers and assigned to the Triple-A Colorado Springs Sky Sox. On August 30, Hernández was designated for assignment by the Brewers. He finished the year with Colorado Springs, posting a 6.75 ERA in 5 games before becoming a free agent on November 2, 2018.

=== Texas Rangers ===
On December 18, 2018, Hernández signed a minor league contract with the Texas Rangers organization. He was assigned to the Triple-A Nashville Sounds to begin the 2019 season, but appeared in just four games due to injury. On October 11, 2019, Hernández was released by the Rangers organization.

=== Ishikawa Million Stars ===
On May 12, 2023, Hernández signed with the Ishikawa Million Stars of the Baseball Challenge League. On October 2, it was announced that he would be leaving the team as a free agent at the end of the season.

=== Charros de Jalisco ===
On February 23, 2024, Hernández signed with the Charros de Jalisco of the Mexican League. However, he was released prior to the season on April 10. On May 3, Hernández re–signed with the Charros. He struggled to a 13.50 ERA in 7 appearances with Jalisco and was released once more on May 22.

=== Gastonia Ghost Peppers ===
On June 3, 2025, Hernández signed with the Gastonia Ghost Peppers of the Atlantic League of Professional Baseball. In seven appearances for Gastonia, he struggled to an 0–2 record and 10.50 ERA with four strikeouts over six innings of work. On June 23, Hernández was released by the Ghost Peppers.

== See also ==
- Rule 5 draft results
