= 2018 Houston Astros season =

57th season in Major League Baseball for the Houston Astros

2018 Houston Astros
- American League West champions
- League: American League
- Division: West
- Ballpark: Minute Maid Park
- City: Houston, Texas
- Record: 103–59 (.636)
- Divisional place: 1st
- Owners: Jim Crane
- General managers: Jeff Luhnow
- Managers: A. J. Hinch
- Television: AT&T SportsNet Southwest (Todd Kalas, Geoff Blum)
- Radio: Sportstalk 790; Houston Astros Radio Network (Robert Ford, Steve Sparks, Geoff Blum); KLAT (Spanish) (Francisco Romero, Alex Treviño)
- Stats: ESPN.com; Baseball Reference

The 2018 Houston Astros season was the 57th season for the Major League Baseball (MLB) franchise located in Houston, Texas, their 54th as the Astros, sixth in both the American League (AL) and AL West division, and 19th at Minute Maid Park. The first-time-ever defending World Series champions with a four-games-to-three decision over the Los Angeles Dodgers, Houston also won their first AL pennant and AL West division title. Their 101–61 record was the second 100-win regular season in franchise history.

Houston began the season on March 29 against their in-state rivals, the Texas Rangers, as ace Justin Verlander made his first Opening Day start as a member of the Astros. George Springer recorded the first six-hit performance during a nine-inning game in franchise history on May 7. Verlander recorded his 2,500th career strikeout on May 16, becoming the 33rd pitcher in MLB history to achieve the feat. From May 25–27, Jose Altuve recorded a base hit in each of 10 consecutive at bats, breaking his own club record. In the amateur draft, the Astros' first round selection was first baseman Seth Beer at 28th overall, and in the third round, shortstop Jeremy Peña.

The Astros once again sent a league-high six players to the 2018 All-Star Game, including third baseman Alex Bregman, second baseman Altuve, outfielder Springer, and pitchers Verlander, Gerrit Cole and Charlie Morton. A. J. Hinch was manager for the American League. Bregman was recognized with the All-Star Game Most Valuable Player Award (MVP), the first Houston Astro so named. The Astros were recognized with the Best Team ESPY Award based on their play since the previous June. On August 19, Verlander became the 114th Major League pitcher—and second Astro—to record 200 career victories. The Astros drew 2,980,549 in home attendance, their highest figure since 2007.

The Astros concluded the regular season on September 30 against the Baltimore Orioles, capping off an unprecedented second consecutive 100-win season and AL West championship. With a 103–59 record, this surpassed the 1998 club for the most regular-season wins in franchise history, which was exceeded the following year. This was the 12th postseason qualification and ninth division title overall in franchise history. Houston pitching combined to establish new MLB records with 1,687 strikeouts, 96 games with 10 or more strikeouts, and became the first team in history to strike out 5 or more batters in each of 162 games.

Houston swept the Cleveland Indians in the American League Division Series (ALDS) to advance to the American League Championship Series (ALCS), where they lost in five games to the Boston Red Sox.

Following the season, Altuve won his fifth consecutive Silver Slugger Award, and pitcher Dallas Keuchel won his fourth Gold Glove Award. Additionally, Verlander, who led the league with 290 strikeouts, and also had a 16–9 W–L, and 2.52 earned run average (ERA), finished as runner-up for the AL Cy Young Award for the second time in three years, and built upon a late-career renaissance.

== Offseason ==
=== Summary ===
The Houston Astros entered the 2018 Major League Baseball season as defending World Series champions after defeating the Los Angeles Dodgers in seven games. In addition to achieving their first-ever World Series championship, they claimed both their first American League (AL) pennant and AL West division championship. Center fielder George Springer was named the World Series Most Valuable Player (MVP) and right-handed starting pitcher Justin Verlander was the American League Championship Series (ALCS) MVP. A number of regular season and multiple-sport awards went to second baseman Jose Altuve, including the AL MVP, Associated Press Male Athlete of the Year, Sports Illustrated Sportsperson of the Year, and The Sporting News Major League Player of the Year awards, among others.

To commemorate their World Series victory, on January 9, the Astros commenced a 100-day celebration at the State Capitol in Austin, displaying the Commissioner's Trophy. Governor Greg Abbott attended.

On January 23, 2018, first baseman Jon Singleton and pitcher Dean Deetz were suspended after testing positive for substances violating MLB's drug policy. Singleton, a former Astros' number-one prospect, had tested positive for the third time and was banned for 100 games.

=== Transactions ===
- November 2, 2017: The following players became free agents at the conclusion of the World Series:
  - Carlos Beltrán (DH): Announced retirement from playing career on November 13, 2017.
  - Tyler Clippard (RHP): Signed a minor league contract with the Toronto Blue Jays.
  - Luke Gregerson (RHP): Signed two-year, $11 million contract with the St. Louis Cardinals, with a vesting option for the 2020 season, on December 13, 2017.
  - Francisco Liriano (LHP): Signed one-year, $4 million contract with the Detroit Tigers.
  - Cameron Maybin (OF): Signed one-year, $3.25 million contract with the Miami Marlins
- December 13: Signed free agent right-handed relief pitcher Joe Smith to a two-year contract worth $14 million.

Arbitration-eligible players

Evan Gattis (C/DH)	Houston Astros December 1, 2017 Tendered contracts	Signed before arbitration date contract terms
Ken Giles (RHP)	Houston Astros December 1, 2017 Tendered contracts	Giles' figure of $4.6 million awarded February 3, 2018 Houston Astros proposed $4.2 million
Dallas Keuchel (LHP)	Houston Astros December 1, 2017 Tendered contracts	Signed before arbitration January 12, 2018 1 year, $13.2 million
Jake Marisnick (CF)	Houston Astros December 1, 2017 Tendered contracts	Signed before arbitration date contract terms
Lance McCullers Jr. (RHP)	Houston Astros December 1, 2017 Tendered contracts	Signed before arbitration date contract terms
Collin McHugh (RHP)	Houston Astros December 1, 2017 Tendered contracts	Signed before arbitration date contract terms
Brad Peacock (RHP)	Houston Astros December 1, 2017 Tendered contracts	Signed before arbitration date contract terms
George Springer (CF)	Houston Astros December 1, 2017 Tendered contracts	Signed before arbitration date contract terms
Mike Fiers (RHP)	Houston Astros December 1, 2017 Did not tender contract	Signed as free agent with Detroit Tigers December 8, 2017 1 year, $6 million

Trades

December 20, 2017	To Houston Astros Player to be named later or cash considerations	To Atlanta Braves Preston Tucker (LF)
January 13, 2018	To Houston Astros Gerrit Cole (RHSP)	To Pittsburgh Pirates Michael Feliz (RHRP), Jason Martin (OF), Colin Moran (3B), and Joe Musgrove (RHP)

== Regular season ==
=== Summary ===
==== March—April ====
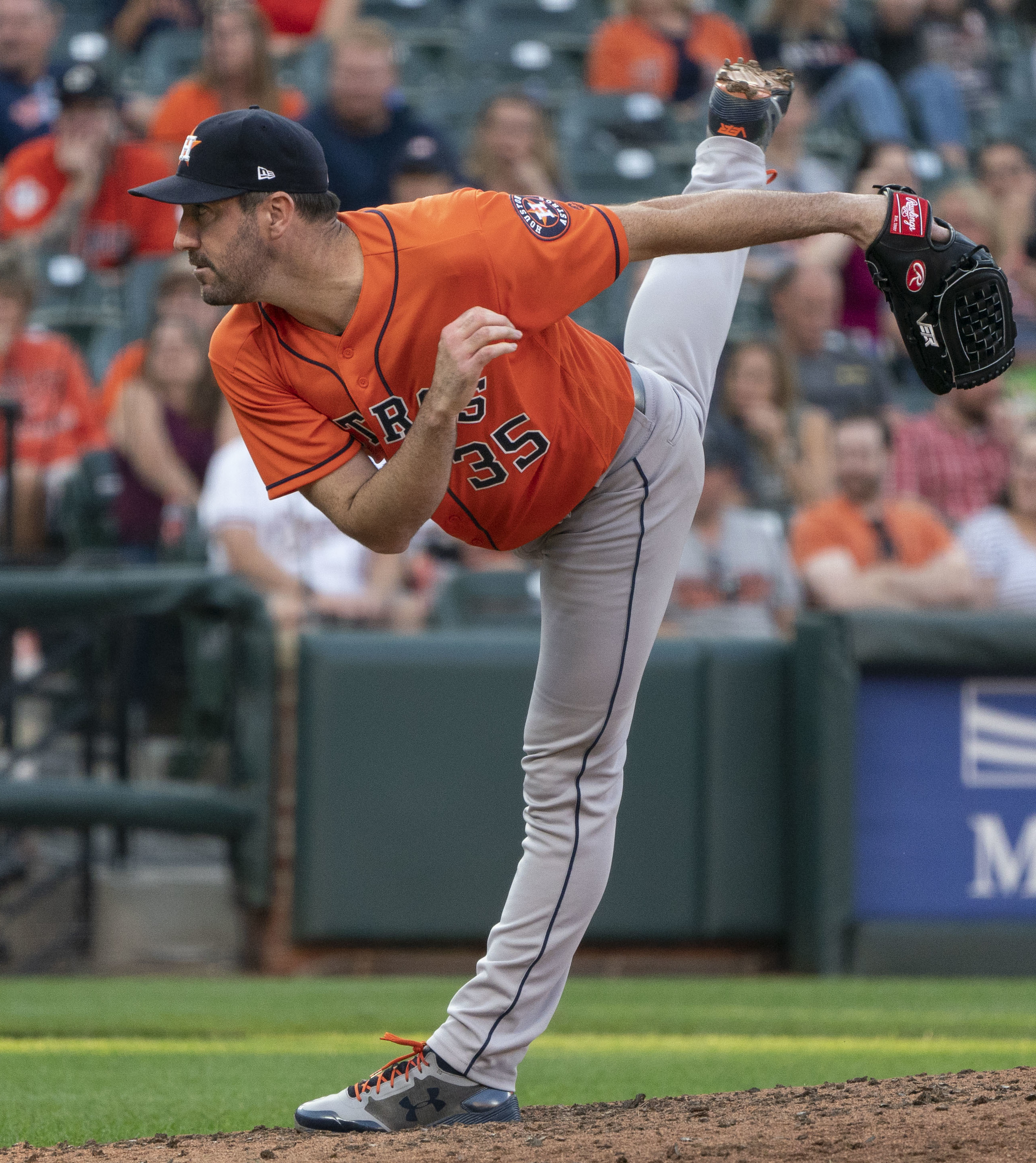
Justin Verlander, Opening Day starting pitcher for Houston.

Opening Day starting lineup
Uniform	Player	Position
4	George Springer	Right fielder
2	Alex Bregman	Third baseman
27	Jose Altuve	Second baseman
1	Carlos Correa	Shortstop
9	Marwin González	First baseman
22	Josh Reddick	Left fielder
11	Evan Gattis	Designated hitter
6	Jake Marisnick	Center fielder
16	Brian McCann	Catcher
35	Justin Verlander	Pitcher
Venue: Globe Life Park • Final: Houston 4, Texas 1 Sources:

Justin Verlander was the Opening Day starting pitcher for Houston at Globe Life Park in Arlington, versus Cole Hamels of the Texas Rangers. It was Verlander's tenth career Opening Day start and first with Houston, as all nine previous had come as a member of the Detroit Tigers. George Springer led the game off with a home run, becoming the first MLB player to lead off with a home run in consecutive Opening Days. He had homered off Felix Hernandez of the Seattle Mariners in the first inning of Opening Day 2017 at Minute Maid Park; the blast was the 100th home run of Springer's career. Verlander pitched six shutout innings and struck out five. The Astros won by a final score of 4–1. This victory was the sixth in catenation on Opening Day for Houston, topping the club record of five from 1972 to 1977. This winning streak extended to ten through 2022, also tying an all-time Major League record established by the Boston Beaneaters, from 1887 to 1896.

On April 3, the Astros conferred World Series rings to players and coaching staff during a pre-game ceremony, and, on April 5, to team employees, including one to groundskeeper Willie Berry, the team's longest tenured employee. The team awarded 1,332 totals rings and paid the associated taxes for those presented to the employees. Berry had started with the Astros in 1970 as a janitor. During the April 3 contest, Josh Reddick connected for his first two home runs of the season and six RBI, including his sixth career grand slam. Reddick tied his career high in RBI, first accomplished on May 16, 2014, as a member of the Oakland Athletics, and produced his first multi-homer game in an Astros uniform. Reddick's effort capped a 10–6 triumph over the Baltimore Orioles.

On April 13, Gerrit Cole struck out a then-career high 14. George Springer (3) homered twice off Cole Hamels of the Texas Rangers. During the top of the seventh inning, Gerrit Cole yielded home runs to Joey Gallo (4) and Robinson Chirinos (1), and departed to a 2-all tie. In the bottom of the eighth, Derek Fisher scored on Marwin González' base hit and error by center fielder Drew Robinson. Joe Smith (1–0) locked down the final out of the top of the eighth for the 3–2 victory, and Chris Devenski struck out the side in the top of the ninth to convert the save (1). Houston pitching totaled 17 whiffs.

On April 14, Charlie Morton tied his career-high with 12 strikeouts over 6 innings, having last done so April 28, 2017.

Second baseman Jose Altuve reached 1,000 games played in his career on April 17, 2018, versus the Mariners. He became the 20th player to appear in 1,000 games for the Astros.

Justin Verlander was named AL Player of the Week on April 15. In 15 innings over one start each versus the Rangers and Minnestota Twins, Verlander whiffed 20. allowed a .100 batting average against, and surrendered one earned run (0.60 earned run average (ERA)) and a 10.00 strikeout-to-walk ratio (K/BB). He garnered his first double-digit strikeout effort of the season (11 verses Texas). His seventh career weekly honor, Verlander had been recognized most recently on September 30, 2012, as a member of the Detroit Tigers.

On April 21, Josh Reddick connected for a second multi-homer game of the month, including a grand slam, to cap a 10–1 win over the Chicago White Sox. Dallas Keuchel (1–3) allowed four hits over six innings to earn his first win of the season. His second grand slam of the month, Reddick became the first Astro since Jeff Bagwell in May 2001 to hit two during the same month. It was also Reddick's seventh career game of five or more RBI.

==== Early May ====
On May 1, Justin Verlander tied his then-career high 14 strikeouts, yielding three hits and no walks over eight shutout innings. Verlander most recently had struck out 14 on August 6, 2012. (Note: On June 12, 2019, he recorded 15 strikeouts.) Verlander's effort included a game score of 90 but received a no-decision after having departed the game with a scoreless tie. During the top of the ninth inning, the New York Yankees scored four times off reliever Ken Giles (0–1), capped by Gary Sánchez' three-run home run.

==== Gerrit Cole's 16-strikeout game ====
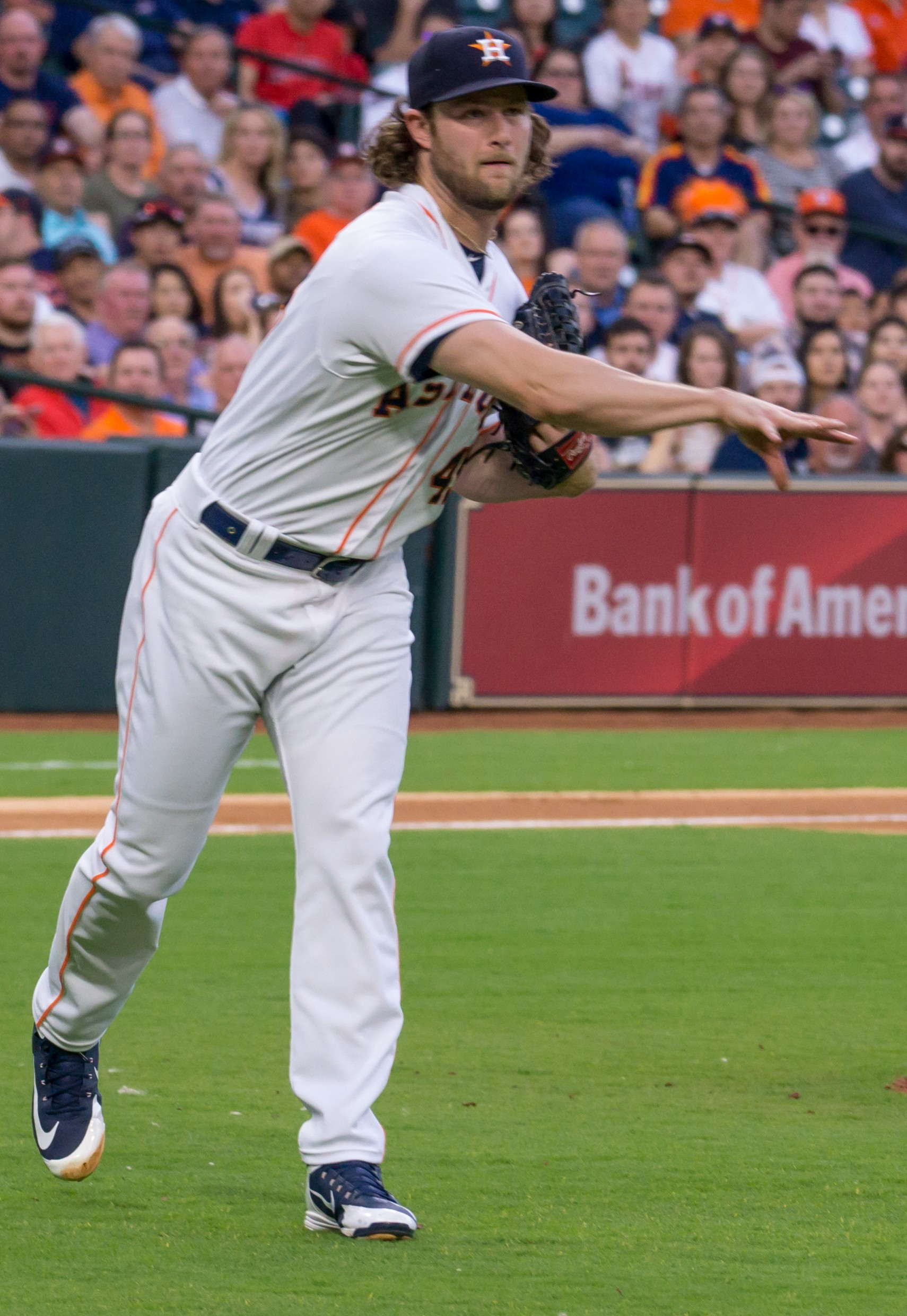
Right-handed pitcher Gerrit Cole on the infield.

Gerrit Cole whiffed a career-high 16 batters on May 4 to lead an 8–0, one-hit victory over the Arizona Diamondbacks. This was Cole's first career shutout, eleventh contest of double-figures in strikeouts, and fifth since joining the Astros. This was also the first one-hitter that Cole pitched. Cole's 16-strikeout performance was the first by an Astros pitcher since Randy Johnson fanned 16 on August 28, 1998, and just the fifth time in club history. (Note: Prior to Johnson, Don Wilson (twice, on July 14 and September 1, 1968), and Nolan Ryan (September 9, 1987) had whiffed 16 or more batters in a single game as an Astro. Criteria: For single games, playing for HOU, in the regular season, requiring strikeouts ≥ 15, sorted by ascending date.)

Moreover, Cole's shutout was the 15th game in major league history that featured a game score of 100 or higher in nine innings or fewer (all fitting these criteria have been either no-hit or one-hit shutout victories), and first in franchise history. On October 2, 2015, Max Scherzer's no-hitter preceded Cole's effort, which was succeeded by Verlander, during his no-hitter on September 1, 2019. (Note: For single games, Only 9-inning games or shortened, in the regular season, requiring game score ≥ 100, sorted by ascending date.)

==== George Springer's six-hit game ====
On May 7, 2018, Springer homered versus the Oakland Athletics during a dynamic offensive performance which saw him go 6-for-6, leading to a 16–2 annihilation of Oakland. He also belted a home run that traveled 462 feet (141 m). Springer became the first in Astros franchise history to collect six hits in a nine-inning game. Joe Morgan owned the first six-hit output by an Astro, culminating his effort in a twelve-inning contest on June 8, 1965.

This was also the fourth individual performance in club history to feature at least five hits and 10 total bases during one game, succeeding Morgan's six-hit game, Lee May (April 29, 1974), and Brandon Barnes (July 19, 2013). (Note: For single games, playing for HOU, in the regular season, requiring total bases ≥ 10, hits ≥ 5, sorted by descending date.)

==== Middle May ====
On May 12, Charlie Morton attained a career-high 14 strikeouts over 7 innings and earned the victory. This surpassed his career-high of 12 strikeouts on April 28, 2017, and on April 14 earlier in the season.

==== Justin Verlander's 2,500th strikeout ====
On May 16, 2018, Verlander threw a complete-game shutout against the Los Angeles Angels for his eighth career shutout and 24th complete game. He struck out Shohei Ohtani in the top of the ninth inning for his 2,500th career strikeout, becoming the 33rd pitcher in Major League history to cross that threshold. He was second among active leaders in strikeouts behind CC Sabathia.

==== Rest of May ====
Over three games versus the Cleveland Indians spanning May 25–27, Altuve recorded a base hit in each of 10 consecutive at bats, breaking his own club record of eight which he had set the year prior. The streak included three doubles, one triple, and one home run. In the finale on May 27, a pitching duel emerged between former UCLA teammates Cole and Trevor Bauer. However, each bullpen implodes in the eighth inning which results in a 10–9 decision for the Indians.

Verlander was named AL Pitcher of the Month for May, his fifth career award. In six starts, he produced a 0.86 ERA and .437 OPS against, allowed nine extra base hits, while striking out 50 over 41 2/3 innings. He started and ended the month by dominating the Yankees—the only lineup in baseball with an OPS over .800—with 20 strikeouts in 14 2/3 innings, eight hits, and one run allowed. Verlander succeeded Lance McCullers Jr. as the most recent Astro to win Pitcher of the Month, having done so for May 2017.

==== June ====
From June 6 to June 13, Evan Gattis became the third player in club history to aggregate 16 or more RBI over a seven-game span. (Note: Following Jeff Bagwell (twice, 19 RBI starting August 13, 2000, and 18 starting on July 6, 2001), and Lance Berkman (16 RBI starting June 28, 2002). Criteria: Unique, isolated periods. In a span of 7 games, playing for HOU, in the regular season, requiring runs batted in ≥ 10, sorted by descending runs ratted in.) For the week ended June 17, Gattis was named AL Player of the Week: Over six games, Gattis batted .417 with four home runs, 15 RBI, 24 total bases and 1.000 slugging percentage (SLG).

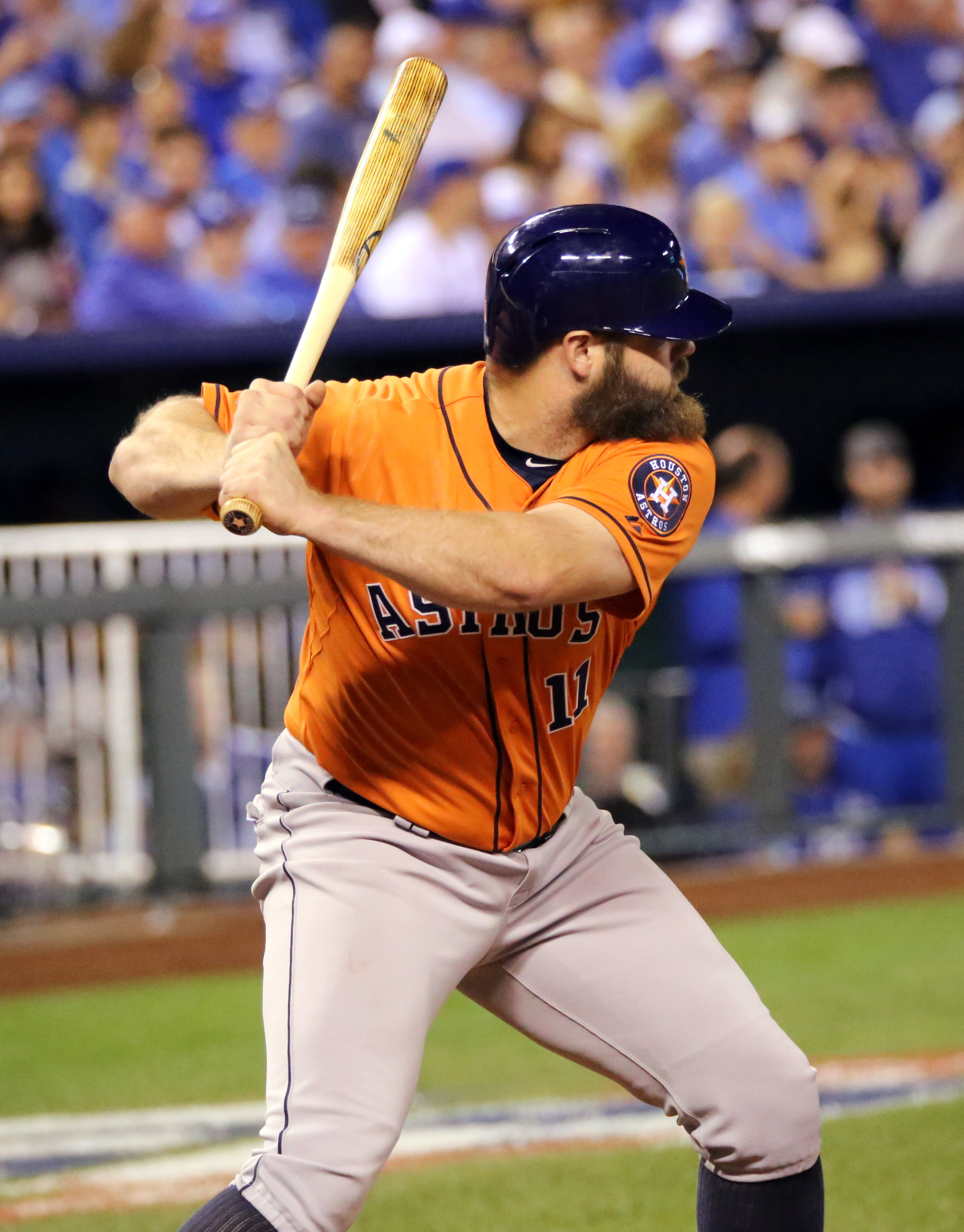
Evan Gattis waits for the pitch

Gattis and Alex Bregman accrued 30 RBI each during the month of June, tying with Didi Gregorius of the New York Yankees for most in a month in the American League during the season, and trailing Christian Yelich (34) of the Milwaukee Brewers in the National League (NL) for most in the Major Leagues. (Note: In the regular season, in 2018, for any choice in Months, requiring runs batted in ≥ 25, sorted by greatest runs batted in.) Bregman and Gattis also became the seventh and eighth hitters in club history to attain 30 or more RBI over a calendar month, with the most recent having been Carlos Lee in May 2008. (Note: Yuli Gurriel produced the next such month the following July 2019. Criteria: In the regular season, from 1898 to 2026, playing for HOU, for any choice in months, requiring runs batted in ≥ 28, sorted by greatest runs batted in.)

Along with 30 RBI, Bregman batted .306 / .372 on-base percentage (OBP) / .713 slugging percentage (SLG) / 1.085 on-base plus slugging (OPS) over 26 contests. The third baseman scored 24 runs, hit nine doubles, and 11 home runs. Hence, Bregman was named AL Player of the Month. Bregman won his first monthly award, while following teammate Jose Altuve in July 2017 as the most recent Astro to be named.

==== July, pre-All-Star break ====
Lance McCullers Jr. started on July 6 by holding the Chicago White Sox hitless for the first 5 1/3 innings on the way to setting a career-high with 12 strikeouts over 7 innings. He finished with 1 run allowed on 3 hits to lead an 11–4 win.

On July 7, Kyle Tucker made his major league debut versus Chicago, collecting a hit that day. Tucker started in left field, batting seventh, and in his first plate appearance, struck out looking against James Shields. Shields struck out Tucker in each first three at bats; however, Tucker singled off reliever Bruce Rondón for his first major league hit in the seventh. In the bottom of the eighth, Tucker drew a bases-loaded walk that scored Yuli Gurriel for his first major league RBI. Gurriel homered and drove in four to lead a 12–6 Astros victory. Alex Bregman homered and doubled. Charlie Morton (11–2) allowed five runs over 5 2/3 frames to earn the victory, struck out eight, and ended the game with a 2.83 earned run average.

On July 13, 2018, Charlie Morton was added to the American League (AL) roster for the 2018 MLB All-Star game making the Astros the only MLB team at the time to have all of their starting pitchers having at least one selection to participate in the MLB All-Star game.

==== MLB All-Star Game ====
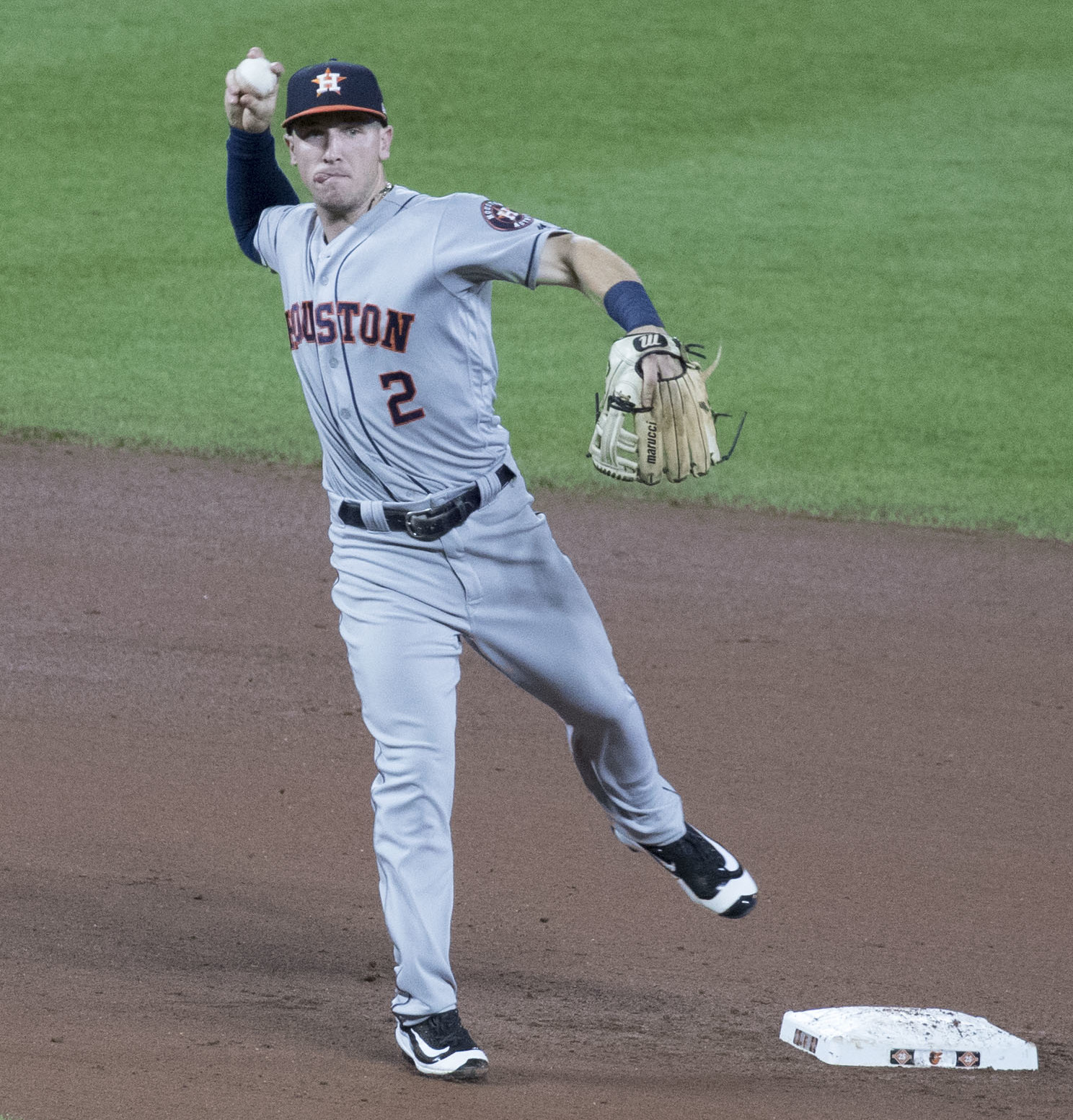
Alex Bregman playing shortstop

For the second consecutive season, the Astros sent a league-high six players to the All-Star Game, hosted at Nationals Park in Washington, D.C.. In addition, A. J. Hinch was manager for the American League squad.

Alex Bregman participated in the Home Run Derby. Bregman appeared in the first round only, in which he was eliminated by Kyle Schwarber, 16 to 15. Schwarber progressed to the final round, where he was defeated by Bryce Harper, 19 to 18.

During a Midsummer Classic featuring a record 10 home runs, Bregman hit the go-ahead run during the top of the tenth inning off Ross Stripling. George Springer golfed Stripling's next offering into the stands as well. as the American League maintained the edge for an 8–6 triumph. The 10 home runs pulverized the All-Star previous record of six. Thus, Bregman was recognized as the All-Star Game Most Valuable Player (MVP), the first Astro to win the award.

==== July, post-All-Star break ====
In late July, the Astros were recognized with the Best Team ESPY Award based on their play since the previous June.

==== August ====
On August 19, Justin Verlander won the 200th game of his career, leading a 9–4 triumph over Oakland, and gain a one-game lead in the division race. Verlander worked 5 1/3 innings, being charged all four runs on seven hits, while departing with a 6–4 lead. Astros hitters struck five home runs in support. Verlander's batterymate, Martín Maldonado, swatted a double, triple, and solo home run, becoming both the first Astros catcher and number-nine hitter to accrue each of the three extra-base hits during the same game. Verlander became the 19th hurler to win 200 games in 412 or fewer, the 114th Major Leaguer overall, the 40th to do so all in the American League, and joined Bartolo Colón (247) and CC Sabathia (244) as the third active pitcher. Verlander became the second player to reach the 200-win threshold in an Astros uniform, succeeding Nolan Ryan on July 27, 1982.

On August 21, southpaw Framber Valdez made his major league debut versus the Seattle Mariners, tossing 4 1/3 in relief. Valdez limited the Mariners to two hits and an unearned run, while striking out four, on the way to earning the decision as the winning pitcher. Valdez took over for opener Brad Peacock, and retired Dee Strange-Gordon on a flyball, Valdez hit three batters, including Strange-Gordon twice. Josh Reddick homered for the Astros, and Carlos Correa went 3-for-3 with an RBI.

==== September ====
Right-hander Josh James made his major league debut on September 1; in doing so, James became lowest-drafted pitcher in club history to start a game for the team (34th round, pick 1,006 in 2014). James tossed five innings, allowed three hits and three runs, and struck out nine, igniting Houston to a 7–3 victory over the Los Angeles Angels. The Astros scored the go-ahead run—five in all—during the bottom of the eighth. Carlos Correa singled in Tony Kemp to tie the game at 3–3, and Tyler White doubled home George Springer and Correa to pull the Astros ahead, 5–3. Joe Smith (5–1) earned the win by recording two outs in the top of the eighth inning.

On September 21, the Astros defeated the Angels, 11–3, clinching a second successive playoff berth, while maintaining a 3 1/2-game lead over second-place Oakland. Yuli Gurriel homered twice, including a grand slam, and amassed seven RBI. George Springer added a three-run home run for Houston, and starter Gerrit Cole (15–5) surrendered three runs and three hits in seven innings, fanning 12 to move to 1,006 for his career. Cole also tallied 272 strikeouts for the season to edge ahead of rotation-mate Justin Verlander (269) for the AL lead. Gurriel's 7 RBI were a career-high and the most in one game for an Astros player since J. R. Towles racked up a club-record 8 on September 20, 2007. Moreover, Gurriel's brother, Lourdes of the Toronto Blue Jays, also thumped a two-home run game, branding the first instance in the Major Leagues that two brothers connected for multi-homer games on the same day.

With a 4–1 triumph over the Blue Jays on September 25, Houston secured their 100th win of the season. Josh James (3–2) tossed five innings to earn the win, and combined with five relievers. Tony Sipp (10), Collin McHugh (11), Ryan Pressly (21), and Héctor Rondón (9) each registered a hold with a scoreless outing, while Roberto Osuna retired the Blue Jays in order in the ninth to convert the save (20). Alex Bregman hit his 31st home run in the first inning. Pinch hitter Evan Gattis swatted a sacrifice fly in the top of the sixth inning to score Yuli Gurriel.

On September 26, 2018, Houston won the AL West division title after the Oakland Athletics were defeated by the Seattle Mariners, following an Astros' 4–1 win against the Toronto Blue Jays.

Following a 21–6 (.778) performance for the month of September, Houston set a club record for highest winning percentage during a calendar month, surpassing a 20–6 (.769) showing during May 1969. The Astros pitched to a 2.99 earned run average (ERA) with 276 strikeouts and a 1.147 walks plus hits per inning pitched (WHIP) over 240 2/3 innings pitched.

==== Performance overview ====
Houston concluded the 2018 regular season with a record of 103–59, in first place in the AL West, and six games ahead of the Oakland Athletics. The 103 wins signaled a club record, surpassing their 102-win season of 1998, and another club record scoring to a plus-263 run differential, a figure which led Major League Baseball. Houston's 57–24 (.704) road record was the second-best in Major League Baseball since 1961. Further, the plus-264 run differential synopsized to a Pythagorean expectation of 109–53 (.673), another franchise record. The Astros drew 2,980,549 fans in attendance, their highest figure since 2007 when they aggregated 3,020,405.

Astros pitchers set a new MLB record by striking out 1,687 opposing batters during the season. The team had 96 games in which they struck out 10 or more batters, also a record. In addition, they were the first team to strike out 5 or more batters in each of 162 games. The 534 runs surrendered by the pitching staff was the second-fewest by an AL club in a non-strike season since the implementation of the DH in 1973.

Meanwhile, the Astros' 63 errors committed set a franchise-record low over an entire season.

With Verlander (290), Cole (276), and Morton (201) each infiltrating the 200-strikeout threshold, this Astros team joined the 1969 squad as the second in franchise history to produce three such hurlers. Moreover, the only other teams in major league history to have previously registered three such pitchers included the 1967 Minnesota Twins and 2013 Detroit Tigers (also with Verlander contributing). This year's Indians squad became the first to boast four such hurlers. (Note: Number of players that meet criteria in a season for a team, in the regular season, requiring strikeouts ≥ 200, sorted by ascending instances.) Further, each of the three aforementioned starting pitchers won at least 15 games and yielded an earned run average (ERA) under 3.50, making this Astros pitching staff the only one in Major League history to feature three pitchers whose output met all three thresholds. (Note: Number of players that meet criteria in a season for a team, in the regular season, requiring strikeouts ≥ 200 and wins ≥ 15 and earned run average ≤ 3.5, sorted by descending instances.)

The Astros, along with the Milwaukee Brewers, became the sixth and seventh Major League clubs to roster three relievers who each converted 12 or more saves (Ken Giles, Roberto Osuna, and Héctor Rondón), tying the major league record. The second time club history for the Astros, the two clubs succeeded the 2016 Astros as the most recent team to accomplish this feat.

Justin Verlander's 290 strikeouts led the American League and were a career-high. In addition, he produced a career-best 0.90 walks plus hits per inning pitched (WHIP), the third-lowest for an AL starter over the 50 prior seasons. (Note: Minimum 175 innings pitched.) Verlander became the fourth Astros pitcher to lead his assigned league in strikeouts, first since Nolan Ryan (228) in 1988, and sixth time overall. (Note: In 1998, Randy Johnson (329) also led the major leagues in strikeouts while splitting the season between the Mariners and Astros—then in the National League (NL)—but led neither the league individually.)

Alex Bregman became the first primary third baseman in league history to attain both 50 doubles and 30 home runs in the same season, while joining Lou Gehrig (1927) as the only major leaguers to assemble 50 doubles, 30 home runs, 90 base on balls, and 10 stolen bases in one season. Bregman's 51 doubles led all of baseball, the eighth time in franchise history by an Astros hitter, and the 11th time overall within the club's assigned league. It was the first occasion by an Astros hitter since moving to the American League, and first since Miguel Tejada in 2009. Bregman was the seventh individual Astro to lead the league, while Craig Biggio led the most times overall for Astros hitters, with three (1994, 1998, and 1999).

Jose Altuve won his fifth Silver Slugger Award in catenation, a club record, all at second base, also a club record. Altuve matched Craig Biggio, winner of five total Silver Sluggers, for most overall in club history; Biggio won four at second base and the other at catcher. Altuve also tied Robinson Canó for most at the position in the AL, while trailing Ryne Sandberg (seven) for most in Major League history.

Willie Berry, who had served for the Houston Astros for 47 of 57 seasons since the early 1970s, was recognized with the Fred Hartman Award for Long and Meritorious Service to Baseball. Berry started as a janitor and later began serving as a groundskeeper at the Astrodome and Minute Maid Park. Berry was the Astros' longest-tenured groundskeeper, known for meticulous preservation of the pitcher's mound.

=== League standings ===
==== American League West ====
AL West
Team	W	L	Pct.	GB	Home	Road
Houston Astros	103	59	.636	—	46‍–‍35	57‍–‍24
Oakland Athletics	97	65	.599	6	50‍–‍31	47‍–‍34
Seattle Mariners	89	73	.549	14	45‍–‍36	44‍–‍37
Los Angeles Angels	80	82	.494	23	42‍–‍39	38‍–‍43
Texas Rangers	67	95	.414	36	34‍–‍47	33‍–‍48

==== American League Wild Card ====
AL Wild Card standings

Division leaders
Team	W	L	Pct.
Boston Red Sox	108	54	.667
Houston Astros	103	59	.636
Cleveland Indians	91	71	.562

Wild Card teams (Top 2 teams qualify for postseason)
Team	W	L	Pct.	GB
New York Yankees	100	62	.617	+3
Oakland Athletics	97	65	.599	—
Tampa Bay Rays	90	72	.556	7
Seattle Mariners	89	73	.549	8
Los Angeles Angels	80	82	.494	17
Minnesota Twins	78	84	.481	19
Toronto Blue Jays	73	89	.451	24
Texas Rangers	67	95	.414	30
Detroit Tigers	64	98	.395	33
Chicago White Sox	62	100	.383	35
Kansas City Royals	58	104	.358	39
Baltimore Orioles	47	115	.290	50

==== Record versus opponents ====
American League

2018 American League record Source: MLB Standings Grid – 2018
Team	BAL	BOS	CWS	CLE	DET	HOU	KC	LAA	MIN	NYY	OAK	SEA	TB	TEX	TOR	NL
Baltimore	—	3–16	3–4	2–5	2–4	1–6	2–4	1–5	1–6	7–12	1–5	1–6	8–11	3–4	5–14	7–13
Boston	16–3	—	3–4	3–4	4–2	3–4	5–1	6–0	4–3	10–9	2–4	4–3	11–8	6–1	15–4	16–4
Chicago	4–3	4–3	—	5–14	7–12	0–7	11–8	2–5	7–12	2–4	2–5	2–4	4–2	4–3	2–4	6–14
Cleveland	5–2	4–3	14–5	—	13–6	3–4	12–7	3–3	10–9	2–5	2–4	2–5	2–4	4–2	3–4	12–8
Detroit	4–2	2–4	12–7	6–13	—	1–5	8–11	3–4	7–12	3–4	0–7	3–4	2–4	3–4	4–3	6–14
Houston	6–1	4–3	7–0	4–3	5–1	—	5–1	13–6	4–2	2–5	12–7	9–10	3–4	12–7	4–2	13–7
Kansas City	4–2	1–5	8–11	7–12	11–8	1–5	—	1–6	10–9	2–5	2–5	1–5	0–7	2–5	2–5	6–14
Los Angeles	5–1	0–6	5–2	3–3	4–3	6–13	6–1	—	4–3	1–5	10–9	8–11	1–6	13–6	4–3	10–10
Minnesota	6–1	3–4	12–7	9–10	12–7	2–4	9–10	3–4	—	2–5	2–5	1–5	3–4	2–4	4–2	8–12
New York	12–7	9–10	4–2	5–2	4–3	5–2	5–2	5–1	5–2	—	3–3	5–1	10–9	4–3	13–6	11–9
Oakland	5–1	4–2	5–2	4–2	7–0	7–12	5–2	9–10	5–2	3–3	—	9–10	2–5	13–6	7–0	12–8
Seattle	6–1	3–4	4–2	5–2	4–3	10–9	5–1	11–8	5–1	1–5	10–9	—	6–1	10–9	3–4	6–14
Tampa Bay	11–8	8–11	2–4	4–2	4–2	4–3	7–0	6–1	4–3	9–10	5–2	1–6	—	5–1	13–6	7–13
Texas	4–3	1–6	3–4	2–4	4–3	7–12	5–2	6–13	4–2	3–4	6–13	9–10	1–5	—	3–3	9–11
Toronto	14–5	4–15	4–2	4–3	3–4	2–4	5–2	3–4	2–4	6–13	0–7	4–3	6–13	3–3	—	13–7

== Game log ==
Past games legend
Astros Win (#bfb)	Astros Loss (#fcc)	Game postponed (#bbb)	Clinched Playoff Berth (#039)	Clinched Division (#090)
Bold denotes an Astros pitcher

Future Games Legend
Home Game	Away Game

=== Regular season ===
2018 Game Log: 103–59 (Home: 46–35; Away: 57–24)
March: 2–1 (Home: 0–0; Away: 2–1)

#	Date	Opponent	Score	Win	Loss	Save	Attendance	Record	Streak
1	March 29	@ Rangers	4–1	**Verlander** (1–0)	Hamels (0–1)	—	47,253	1–0	W1
2	March 30	@ Rangers	1–5	Fister (1–0)	**Keuchel** (0–1)	—	35,469	1–1	L1
3	March 31	@ Rangers	9–3	**McCullers** (1–0)	Moore (0–1)	—	36,892	2–1	W1

April: 18–9 (Home: 10–6; Away: 8–3)

#	Date	Opponent	Score	Win	Loss	Save	Attendance	Record	Streak
4	April 1	@ Rangers	8–2	**Cole** (1–0)	Minor (0–1)	—	26,758	3–1	W2
5	April 2	Orioles	6–1	**Morton** (1–0)	Tillman (0–1)	—	42,675	4–1	W3
6	April 3	Orioles	10–6	**Rondón** (1–0)	Araújo (0–1)	—	37,106	5–1	W4
7	April 4	Orioles	3–2	**Peacock** (1–0)	Castro (0–1)	—	27,698	6–1	W5
8	April 6	Padres	1–4	Perdomo (1–1)	**McCullers** (1–1)	Hand (2)	41,138	6–2	L1
9	April 7	Padres	1–0	**Devenski** (1–0)	Erlin (0–1)	—	42,306	7–2	W1
10	April 8	Padres	4–1	**Morton** (2–0)	Ross (1–1)	**Peacock** (1)	37,093	8–2	W2
11	April 9	@ Twins	2–0	**Verlander** (2–0)	Rogers (1–1)	**Giles** (1)	15,521	9–2	W3
12	April 10	@ Twins	1–4	Odorizzi (1–0)	**Keuchel** (0–2)	Rodney (2)	15,500	9–3	L1
13	April 11	@ Twins	8–9	Rodney (1–1)	**Peacock** (1–1)	—	15,438	9–4	L2
14	April 13	Rangers	3–2	**Smith** (1–0)	Jepsen (0–2)	**Devenski** (1)	32,129	10–4	W1
15	April 14	Rangers	5–6 (10)	Kela (1–0)	**Harris** (0–1)	Claudio (1)	40,679	10–5	L1
16	April 15	Rangers	1–3 (10)	Kela (2–0)	**Rondón** (1–1)	Diekman (1)	31,803	10–6	L2
17	April 16	@ Mariners	1–2	Paxton (1–1)	**Keuchel** (0–3)	Díaz (7)	12,923	10–7	L3
18	April 17	@ Mariners	4–1	**McCullers** (2–1)	Altavilla (1–2)	**Devenski** (2)	15,382	11–7	W1
19	April 18	@ Mariners	7–1	**Cole** (2–0)	Leake (2–1)	—	14,643	12–7	W2
20	April 19	@ Mariners	9–2	**Morton** (3–0)	Gonzales (1–2)	—	16,927	13–7	W3
21	April 20	@ White Sox	10–0	**Verlander** (3–0)	Shields (1–2)	—	14,211	14–7	W4
22	April 21	@ White Sox	10–1	**Keuchel** (1–3)	Giolito (0–3)	—	23,902	15–7	W5
23	April 22	@ White Sox	7–1	**McCullers** (3–1)	Bummer (0–1)	—	17,167	16–7	W6
24	April 23	Angels	0–2	Skaggs (3–1)	**Cole** (2–1)	Middleton (6)	29,606	16–8	L1
25	April 24	Angels	7–8	Johnson (2–0)	**Smith** (1–1)	Bedrosian (1)	36,457	16–9	L2
26	April 25	Angels	5–2	**Verlander** (4–0)	Tropeano (1–2)	**Giles** (2)	29,777	17–9	W1
27	April 27	Athletics	1–8	Manaea (4–2)	**Keuchel** (1–4)	—	32,636	17–10	L1
28	April 28	Athletics	11–0	**McCullers** (4–1)	Mengden (2–3)	—	41,493	18–10	W1
29	April 29	Athletics	8–4	**Harris** (1–1)	Cahill (1–1)	—	39,131	19–10	W2
30	April 30	Yankees	2–1	**Morton** (4–0)	Gray (1–2)	**Giles** (3)	30,061	20–10	W3

May: 16–12 (Home: 7–5; Away: 9–7)

#	Date	Opponent	Score	Win	Loss	Save	Attendance	Record	Streak
31	May 1	Yankees	0–4	Robertson (2–1)	**Giles** (0–1)	—	34,386	20–11	L1
32	May 2	Yankees	0–4	Severino (5–1)	**Keuchel** (1–5)	—	31,617	20–12	L2
33	May 3	Yankees	5–6	Shreve (1–0)	**Harris** (1–2)	Chapman (7)	34,838	20–13	L3
34	May 4	@ D-backs	8–0	**Cole** (3–1)	Medlen (0–1)	—	29,463	21–13	W1
35	May 5	@ D-backs	3–4	Boxberger (1–2)	**Devenski** (1–1)	—	39,154	21–14	L1
36	May 6	@ D-backs	1–3	Koch (2–0)	**Verlander** (4–1)	Boxberger (11)	35,632	21–15	L2
37	May 7	@ Athletics	16–2	**Keuchel** (2–5)	Anderson (0–1)	—	7,360	22–15	W1
38	May 8	@ Athletics	4–2	**McCullers** (5–1)	Manaea (4–4)	**Giles** (4)	9,675	23–15	W2
39	May 9	@ Athletics	4–1	**Cole** (4–1)	Mengden (2–4)	**Giles** (5)	18,044	24–15	W3
40	May 11	Rangers	0–1	Hamels (2–4)	**Verlander** (4–2)	Kela (8)	34,297	24–16	L1
41	May 12	Rangers	6–1	**Morton** (5–0)	Fister (1–4)	—	36,482	25–16	W1
42	May 13	Rangers	6–1	**Keuchel** (3–5)	Moore (1–5)	—	39,405	26–16	W2
43	May 14	@ Angels	1–2	Heaney (2-2)	**McCullers** (5-2)	Anderson (1)	28,229	26–17	L1
44	May 15	@ Angels	5–3	**McHugh** (1–0)	Álvarez (2–1)	**Giles** (6)	28,358	27–17	W1
45	May 16	@ Angels	2–0	**Verlander** (5–2)	Richards (4–2)	—	28,078	28–17	W2
46	May 18	Indians	4–1	**Morton** (6–0)	Clevinger (3–1)	**Giles** (7)	35,959	29–17	W3
47	May 19	Indians	4–5	Kluber (7–2)	**Keuchel** (3–6)	Allen (6)	39,926	29–18	L1
48	May 20	Indians	3–1	**McCullers** (6–2)	Carrasco (5–3)	**Giles** (8)	30,770	30–18	W1
49	May 22	Giants	11–2	**Cole** (5–1)	Suárez (1–4)	—	35,638	31–18	W2
50	May 23	Giants	4–1	**Verlander** (6–2)	Samardzija (1–3)	**Giles** (9)	31,929	32–18	W3
51	May 24	@ Indians	8–2	**Morton** (7–0)	Clevinger (3–2)	—	19,660	33–18	W4
52	May 25	@ Indians	11–2	**Smith** (2–1)	Miller (1–3)	—	29,431	34–18	W5
53	May 26	@ Indians	6–8	Carrasco (6–3)	**McCullers** (6–3)	Allen (8)	30,639	34–19	L1
54	May 27	@ Indians	9–10 (14)	Otero (1–1)	**Peacock** (1–2)	—	27,765	34–20	L2
55	May 28	@ Yankees	5–1	**Verlander** (7–2)	Germán (0–3)	—	46,583	35–20	W1
56	May 29	@ Yankees	5–6 (10)	Chapman (2–0)	**Peacock** (1–3)	—	45,458	35–21	L1
57	May 30	@ Yankees	3–5	Severino (8–1)	**Keuchel** (3–7)	Chapman (12)	45,229	35–22	L2
58	May 31	Red Sox	4–2	**McCullers** (7–3)	Pomeranz (1–3)	**Giles** (10)	30,658	36–22	W1

June: 19–8 (Home: 8–6; Away: 11–2)

#	Date	Opponent	Score	Win	Loss	Save	Attendance	Record	Streak
59	June 1	Red Sox	7–3	**Cole** (6–1)	Sale (5–3)	—	37,244	37–22	W2
60	June 2	Red Sox	3–5	Price (6–4)	**Harris** (1–3)	Kimbrel (19)	38,640	37–23	L1
61	June 3	Red Sox	3–9	Porcello (8–2)	**Morton** (7–1)	—	33,431	37–24	L2
62	June 5	Mariners	1–7	Paxton (5–1)	**Keuchel** (3–8)	—	35,646	37–25	L3
63	June 6	Mariners	7–5	**Devenski** (2–1)	Nicasio (1–3)	**Rondón** (1)	30,361	38–25	W1
64	June 7	@ Rangers	5–2	**Cole** (7–1)	Hamels (3–6)	—	30,236	39–25	W2
65	June 8	@ Rangers	7–3	**Verlander** (8–2)	Fister (1–7)	—	31,722	40–25	W3
66	June 9	@ Rangers	4–3	**Sipp** (1–0)	Leclerc (1–2)	**Rondón** (2)	38,068	41–25	W4
67	June 10	@ Rangers	8–7	**Harris** (2–3)	Kela (3–3)	**Rondón** (3)	30,251	42–25	W5
68	June 12	@ Athletics	6–3	**McCullers** (8–3)	Mengden (6–6)	**Giles** (11)	11,742	43–25	W6
69	June 13	@ Athletics	13–5	**Cole** (8–1)	Blackburn (1–1)	—	9,164	44–25	W7
70	June 14	@ Athletics	7–3	**Verlander** (9–2)	Montas (3–1)	—	13,009	45–25	W8
71	June 15	@ Royals	7–3	**Morton** (8–1)	Junis (5–7)	—	27,603	46–25	W9
72	June 16	@ Royals	10–2	**Keuchel** (4–8)	Duffy (3–7)	—	20,657	47–25	W10
73	June 17	@ Royals	7–4	**Sipp** (2–0)	Maurer (0–3)	**Rondón** (4)	22,326	48–25	W11
74	June 18	Rays	5–4	**McHugh** (2–0)	Romo (1–2)	—	34,151	49–25	W12
75	June 19	Rays	1–2	Snell (9–4)	**Rondón** (1–2)	Romo (4)	37,414	49–26	L1
76	June 20	Rays	5–1	**Morton** (9–1)	Eovaldi (1–3)	—	43,409	50–26	W1
77	June 22	Royals	0–1	Grimm (1–2)	**Giles** (0–2)	Hill (1)	39,357	50–27	L1
78	June 23	Royals	4–3 (12)	**McHugh** (3–0)	Grimm (1–3)	—	40,028	51–27	W1
79	June 24	Royals	11–3	**Cole** (9–1)	Hammel (2–9)	—	41,823	52–27	W2
80	June 25	Blue Jays	3–6	Happ (10–3)	**Verlander** (9–3)	Oh (2)	28,791	52–28	L1
81	June 26	Blue Jays	7–0	**Morton** (10–1)	Borucki (0–1)	—	38,700	53–28	W1
82	June 27	Blue Jays	7–6	**Harris** (3–3)	Tepera (5–3)	—	39,191	54–28	W2
83	June 28	@ Rays	1–0	**McCullers** (9–3)	Yarbrough (7–4)	**Rondón** (5)	12,305	55–28	W3
84	June 29	@ Rays	2–3	**Font** (2–3)	Cole (9–2)	**Alvarado** (2)	15,797	55–29	L1
85	June 30	@ Rays	2–5	Nuño (2–0)	**Verlander** (9–4)	Romo (7)	18,378	55–30	L2

July: 13–11 (Home: 7–7; Away: 6–4)

#	Date	Opponent	Score	Win	Loss	Save	Attendance	Record	Streak
86	July 1	@ Rays	2–3	Snell (11–4)	**Morton** (10–2)	Romo (8)	19,334	55–31	L3
87	July 3	@ Rangers	5–3	**Keuchel** (5–8)	Bibens-Dirkx (1–2)	**Rondón** (6)	40,165	56–31	W1
88	July 4	@ Rangers	5–4 (10)	**McHugh** (4–0)	Martin (1–2)	**Giles** (12)	43,592	57–31	W2
89	July 5	White Sox	4–3	**Smith** (3–1)	Soria (0–3)	—	34,955	58–31	W3
90	July 6	White Sox	11–4	**McCullers** (10–3)	López (4–6)	**Peacock** (2)	38,153	59–31	W4
91	July 7	White Sox	12–6	**Morton** (11–2)	Shields (3–10)	—	39,568	60–31	W5
92	July 8	White Sox	2–1	**Keuchel** (6–8)	Giolito (5–8)	**Rondón** (7)	41,654	61–31	W6
93	July 9	Athletics	0–2	Montas (5–2)	**Peacock** (1–4)	Treinen (23)	28,301	61–32	L1
94	July 10	Athletics	6–5 (11)	**McHugh** (5–0)	Treinen (5–2)	—	34,585	62–32	W1
95	July 11	Athletics	3–8	Bassitt (2–3)	**McCullers** (10–4)	—	41,119	62–33	L1
96	July 12	Athletics	4–6	Petit (3–2)	**Devenski** (2–2)	Trivino (4)	38,900	62–34	L2
97	July 13	Tigers	3–0	**Keuchel** (7–8)	Fiers (6–6)	**Rondón** (8)	38,843	63–34	W1
98	July 14	Tigers	9–1	**Cole** (10–2)	Fulmer (3–9)	—	40,405	64–34	W2
99	July 15	Tigers	3–6	VerHagen (1–2)	**Verlander** (9–5)	—	39,455	64–35	L1
**89th All-Star Game in Washington, D.C.**
100	July 20	@ Angels	3–1	**Keuchel** (8–8)	Skaggs (7–6)	**Rondón** (9)	42,422	65–35	W1
101	July 21	@ Angels	7–0	**Verlander** (10–5)	Tropeano (3–5)	—	44,264	66–35	W2
102	July 22	@ Angels	5–14	Heaney (6–6)	**McCullers** (10–5)	—	35,298	66–36	L1
103	July 24	@ Rockies	8–2 (10)	**Rondón** (2–2)	Davis (0–3)	—	43,184	67–36	W1
104	July 25	@ Rockies	2–3	Davis (1–3)	**McHugh** (5–1)	—	40,948	67–37	L1
105	July 27	Rangers	2–11	Gallardo (5–1)	**Keuchel** (8–9)	—	42,592	67–38	L2
106	July 28	Rangers	3–7	Jurado (1–1)	**Verlander** (10–6)	—	43,093	67–39	L3
107	July 29	Rangers	3–4	Minor (7–6)	**McCullers** (10–6)	Kela (24)	40,560	67–40	L4
108	July 30	@ Mariners	0–2	Paxton (9–4)	**Cole** (10–3)	Díaz (40)	35,198	67–41	L5
109	July 31	@ Mariners	5–2	**Morton** (12–2)	Leake (8–7)	**Rondón** (10)	28,478	68–41	W1

August: 14–12 (Home: 3–6; Away: 11–6)

#	Date	Opponent	Score	Win	Loss	Save	Attendance	Record	Streak
110	August 1	@ Mariners	8–3	**Keuchel** (9–9)	LeBlanc (6–2)	—	34,575	69–41	W2
111	August 3	@ Dodgers	2–1	**Verlander** (11–6)	Wood (7–6)	**Rondón** (11)	53,598	70–41	W3
112	August 4	@ Dodgers	14–0	**Peacock** (2–4)	Maeda (7–7)	—	53,119	71–41	W4
113	August 5	@ Dodgers	2–3	Buehler (5–4)	**Cole** (10–4)	Jansen (31)	50,628	71–42	L1
114	August 6	@ Giants	3–1	**Osuna** (1–0)	Smith (1–2)	**Rondón** (12)	40,251	72–42	W1
115	August 7	@ Giants	2–1	**Smith** (4–1)	Black (1–1)	**Rondón** (13)	41,613	73–42	W2
116	August 9	Mariners	6–8	Paxton (10–5)	**Verlander** (11–7)	Díaz (43)	34,976	73–43	L1
117	August 10	Mariners	2–5	Warren (1–1)	**Cole** (10–5)	Díaz (44)	41,236	73–44	L2
118	August 11	Mariners	2–3	LeBlanc (7–2)	**Morton** (12–3)	Díaz (45)	38,888	73–45	L3
119	August 12	Mariners	3–4 (10)	Duke (5–4)	**Osuna** (1–1)	Díaz (46)	40,048	73–46	L4
120	August 14	Rockies	1–5	Márquez (10–9)	**Verlander** (11–8)	—	35,813	73–47	L5
121	August 15	Rockies	12–1	**Cole** (11–5)	Anderson (6–5)	—	29,967	74–47	W1
122	August 17	@ Athletics	3–4 (10)	Treinen (6–2)	**Sipp** (2–1)	—	23,535	74–48	L1
123	August 18	@ Athletics	1–7	Cahill (5–2)	**Keuchel** (9–10)	—	32,204	74–49	L2
124	August 19	@ Athletics	9–4	**Verlander** (12–8)	Manaea 11–9)	—	29,143	75–49	W1
125	August 20	@ Mariners	4–7	Colomé (4–5)	**McHugh** (5–2)	Díaz (48)	27,072	75–50	L1
126	August 21	@ Mariners	3–2	**Valdez** (1–0)	Detwiler (0–1)	**Rondón** (14)	25,415	76–50	W1
127	August 22	@ Mariners	10–7	**Morton** (13–3)	Gonzales (12–9)	**Osuna** (10)	31,062	77–50	W2
128	August 24	@ Angels	9–3	**Keuchel** (10–10)	Heaney (7–8)	—	42,788	78–50	W3
129	August 25	@ Angels	8–3	**Verlander** (13–8)	Barría (8–8)	—	41,654	79–50	W4
130	August 26	@ Angels	3–1	**Valdez** (2–0)	Peña (1–4)	**Osuna** (11)	37,530	80–50	W5
131	August 27	Athletics	11–4	**Cole** (12–5)	Anderson (3–4)	—	43,171	81–50	W6
132	August 28	Athletics	3–4	Familia (8–4)	**Osuna** (1–2)	Treinen (33)	33,136	81–51	L1
133	August 29	Athletics	5–4	**Osuna** (2–2)	Familia (8–5)	—	32,926	82–51	W1
134	August 30	Angels	2–5	Heaney (8–8)	**Verlander** (13–9)	—	30,371	82–52	L1
135	August 31	Angels	0–3	Barría (9–8)	**Valdez** (2–1)	Parker (13)	35,675	82–53	L2

September: 21–6 (Home: 11–3; Away: 10–3)

#	Date	Opponent	Score	Win	Loss	Save	Attendance	Record	Streak
136	September 1	Angels	7–3	**Smith** (5–1)	Bedrosian (5–4)	—	41,622	83–53	W1
137	September 2	Angels	4–2	**Cole** (13–5)	Ohtani (4–2)	**Osuna** (12)	41,506	84–53	W2
138	September 3	Twins	4–1	**Keuchel** (11–10)	Gibson (7–12)	**Peacock** (3)	39,559	85–53	W3
139	September 4	Twins	5–2	**Verlander** (14–9)	May (3–1)	**Osuna** (13)	31,315	86–53	W4
140	September 5	Twins	9–1	**Valdez** (3–1)	Odorizzi (5–10)	—	31,011	87–53	W5
141	September 7	@ Red Sox	6–3	**Pressly** (2–1)	Kelly (4–2)	**Osuna** (14)	36,930	88–53	W6
142	September 8	@ Red Sox	5–3	**Morton** (14–3)	Rodríguez (12–4)	**Osuna** (15)	36,684	89–53	W7
143	September 9	@ Red Sox	5–6	Kimbrel (5–1)	**Rondón** (2–3)	—	32,787	89–54	L1
144	September 10	@ Tigers	3–2	**Verlander** (15–9)	Liriano (4–10)	**Osuna** (16)	19,711	90–54	W1
145	September 11	@ Tigers	5–4	**Harris** (4–3)	Zimmermann (7–7)	**Osuna** (17)	19,432	91–54	W2
146	September 12	@ Tigers	5–4	**Cole** (14–5)	Norris (0–4)	**Pressly** (1)	22,666	92–54	W3
147	September 14	D-backs	2–4	Ziegler (2–6)	**Rondón** (2–4)	Hirano (2)	36,924	92–55	L1
148	September 15	D-backs	10–4	**Morton** (15–3)	Godley (14–10)	—	38,345	93–55	W1
149	September 16	D-backs	5–4	**Verlander** (16–9)	Greinke (14–10)	**Osuna** (18)	37,889	94–55	W2
150	September 17	Mariners	1–4	Cook (2–1)	**Rondón** (2–5)	**Díaz** (56)	43,145	94–56	L1
151	September 18	Mariners	7–0	**James** (1–0)	Leake (10–10)	–	35,715	95–56	W1
152	September 19	Mariners	0–9	Lawrence (1–0)	**Keuchel** (11–11)	–	31,229	95–57	L1
153	September 21	Angels	11–3	**Cole** (15–5)	Heaney (9–10)	—	39,977	96–57	W1
154	September 22	Angels	10–5	**McHugh** (6–2)	Buttrey (0–1)	—	41,822	97–57	W2
155	September 23	Angels	6–2	**Valdez** (4–1)	Skaggs (8–9)	—	43,247	98–57	W3
156	September 24	@ Blue Jays	5–3	**Keuchel** (12–11)	Estrada (7–14)	**Osuna** (19)	23,463	99–57	W4
157	September 25	@ Blue Jays	4–1	**James** (2–0)	Gaviglio (3–9)	**Osuna** (20)	28,440	100–57	W5
158	September 26	@ Blue Jays	1–3	Biagini (4–7)	**Devenski** (2–3)	**Giles** (25)	22,828	100–58	L1
—	September 27	@ Orioles	Postponed (rain). Makeup date: September 29.						
159	September 28	@ Orioles	2–1	**Sipp** (3–1)	Scott (3–3)	**Osuna** (21)	18,434	101–58	W1
160	September 29 (1)	@ Orioles	4–3	**Harris** (5–3)	Gilmartin (1–1)	**Rondón** (15)	26,020	102–58	W2
161	September 29 (2)	@ Orioles	5–2	**Peacock** (3–4)	Ramírez (1–8)	**Pressly** (2)	26,020	103–58	W3
162	September 30	@ Orioles	0–4	Fry (1–2)	**Peacock** (3–5)	—	24,916	103–59	L1

== Player statistics ==
Table legend
*	Left-handed batter or pitcher	League leader (Bold: MLB leader)	League leader (multiple teams)
#	Switch hitter	League top ten	League top ten (multiple teams)
	Leader in appearances at position	Team leader	

=== Batting ===
Statistics legend
⌖	Position	AB	At bats	2B	Doubles	RBI	Runs batted in	SB	Stolen bases	SLG	Slugging percentage
G	Games played	R	Runs scored	3B	Triples	BB	Bases on balls	AVG	Batting average	OPS	On-base plus slugging percentage
PA	Plate appearances	H	Hits	HR	Home runs	SO	Strikeouts	OBP	On-base percentage

⌖	Player	G	AB	R	H	2B	3B	HR	RBI	SB	BB	AVG	SLG
C	Max Stassi	88	221	28	50	13	0	8	27	0	23	.226	.394
1B	Yuli Gurriel	136	537	70	156	33	1	13	85	5	23	.291	.428
2B	Jose Altuve	137	534	84	169	29	2	13	61	17	55	.316	.451
3B	Alex Bregman	157	594	105	170	**51**	1	31	103	10	96	.286	.532
SS	Carlos Correa	110	402	60	96	20	1	15	65	3	53	.239	.405
LF	Marwin González^{#}	145	489	61	121	25	3	16	68	2	53	.247	.409
CF	Jake Marisnick	103	213	34	45	8	1	10	28	6	15	.211	.399
RF	Josh Reddick*	134	433	63	105	13	2	17	47	7	49	.242	.400
DH	Evan Gattis	128	407	49	92	17	0	25	78	1	33	.226	.452
OF	George Springer	140	544	102	144	26	0	22	71	6	64	.265	.434
OF	Tony Kemp	97	255	37	67	15	0	6	30	9	32	.263	.392
1B	Tyler White	66	210	27	58	12	3	12	42	0	24	.276	.533
C	Brian McCann*	63	189	22	40	3	0	7	23	0	19	.212	.339
C	Martín Maldonado	41	108	15	25	4	1	4	12	0	3	.231	.398
CI	J. D. Davis	42	103	9	18	2	0	1	5	0	10	.175	.223
LF	Derek Fisher*	42	79	13	13	2	2	4	11	2	5	.165	.392
LF	Kyle Tucker*	28	64	10	9	2	1	0	4	1	6	.141	.203
C	Tim Federowicz	10	34	4	7	3	0	0	2	0	1	.206	.294
OF	Myles Straw	9	9	4	3	0	0	1	1	2	1	.333	.667
1B	A. J. Reed*	1	3	0	0	0	0	0	0	0	0	.000	.000
Pitcher totals			25	0	2	0	0	0	0	0	0	.080	.080
**Team totals**		**162**	**5453**	**797**	**1390**	**291**	**29**	**205**	**763**	**71**	**565**	**.255**	**.425**

=== Pitching ===
Statistics legend
⌖	Pitching role	ERA	Earned run average	GF	Games finished	IP	Innings pitched	ER	Earned runs allowed	WHIP	Walks plus hits per inning pitched
W	Wins	G	Games pitched	SV	Saves	H	Hits allowed	BB	Base on balls	K/BB	Strikeout-to-walk ratio
L	Losses	GS	Games started	HD	Holds	R	Runs allowed	SO	Strikeouts

⌖	Player	W	L	ERA	G	GS	SV	IP	H	R	ER	BB	SO
SP	Justin Verlander	16	9	2.52	34	34	0	214.0	156	63	60	37	290
SP	Dallas Keuchel*	12	11	3.74	34	34	0	204.2	**211**	92	85	58	153
SP	Gerrit Cole	15	5	2.88	32	32	0	200.1	143	68	64	64	276
SP	Charlie Morton	15	3	3.13	30	30	0	167.0	130	63	58	64	201
SP	Lance McCullers Jr.	10	6	3.86	25	22	0	128.1	100	60	55	50	112
RP	Collin McHugh	6	2	1.99	58	0	0	72.1	45	18	16	21	94
RP	Brad Peacock	3	5	3.46	61	1	3	65.0	56	26	25	20	96
RP	Héctor Rondón	2	5	3.20	63	0	15	59.0	58	22	21	20	67
RP	Will Harris	5	3	3.49	61	0	0	56.2	48	22	22	14	64
RP	Chris Devenski	2	3	4.18	50	1	2	47.1	42	23	22	13	51
RP	Joe Smith	5	1	3.74	56	0	0	45.2	34	20	19	12	46
RP	Tony Sipp*	3	1	1.86	54	0	0	38.2	27	8	8	13	42
SP	Framber Valdez*	4	1	2.19	8	5	0	37.0	22	10	9	24	34
RP	Ken Giles (Note: League leaders include totals with Toronto and Houston)	0	2	4.99	34	0	12	30.2	36	17	17	3	31
RP	Ryan Pressly	1	0	0.77	26	0	2	23.1	11	2	2	3	32
SP	Josh James	2	0	2.35	6	3	0	23.0	15	6	6	7	29
RP	Roberto Osuna	2	2	1.99	23	0	12	22.2	17	5	5	3	19
RP	Cionel Pérez*	0	0	3.97	8	0	0	11.1	6	5	5	7	12
RP	Reymin Guduan*	0	0	2.70	3	0	0	3.1	1	1	1	0	4
RP	Dean Deetz	0	0	5.40	4	0	0	3.1	4	2	2	1	3
PO	J. D. Davis	0	0	9.00	1	0	0	1.0	1	1	1	0	1
RP	James Hoyt	0	0	0.00	1	0	0	0.1	1	0	0	1	0
**Team totals**		**103**	**59**	**3.11**	**162**	**162**	**46**	**1455.0**	**1164**	**534**	**503**	**435**	**1687**

=== Postseason ===
2018 Postseason Game Log (4–4)
AL Division Series (3–0)

#	Date	Opponent	Score	Win	Loss	Save	Attendance	Series
1	October 5	Indians	7–2	**Verlander** (1–0)	Kluber (0–1)	—	43,514	1–0
2	October 6	Indians	3–1	**Cole** (1–0)	Carrasco (0–1)	**Osuna** (1)	43,520	2–0
3	October 8	@ Indians	11–3	**McHugh** (1–0)	Bauer (0–1)	—	37,252	3–0

AL Championship Series (1–4)

#	Date	Opponent	Score	Win	Loss	Save	Attendance	Series
1	October 13	@ Red Sox	7–2	**Verlander** (1–0)	Kelly (0–1)	—	38,007	1–0
2	October 14	@ Red Sox	5–7	Barnes (1–0)	**Cole** (0–1)	Kimbrel (1)	37,960	1–1
3	October 16	Red Sox	2–8	Eovaldi (1–0)	**Smith** (0–1)	—	43,102	1–2
4	October 17	Red Sox	6–8	Kelly (1–1)	**James** (0–1)	Kimbrel (2)	43,277	1–3
5	October 18	Red Sox	1–4	Price (1–0)	**Verlander** (1–1)	Kimbrel (3)	43,210	1–4

== Postseason rosters ==
Playoff rosters
American League Division Series

- Pitchers: 29 Tony Sipp 31 Collin McHugh 35 Justin Verlander 36 Will Harris 43 Lance McCullers Jr. 45 Gerrit Cole 50 Charlie Morton 54 Roberto Osuna 55 Ryan Pressly 60 Dallas Keuchel 63 Josh James
- Catchers: 11 Evan Gattis 15 Martín Maldonado 16 Brian McCann
- Infielders: 1 Carlos Correa 2 Alex Bregman 9 Marwin González 10 Yuli Gurriel 13 Tyler White 27 Jose Altuve
- Outfielders: 4 George Springer 18 Tony Kemp 22 Josh Reddick 26 Myles Straw

American League Championship Series

- Pitchers: 29 Tony Sipp 30 Héctor Rondón 31 Collin McHugh 35 Justin Verlander 38 Joe Smith 43 Lance McCullers Jr. 45 Gerrit Cole 50 Charlie Morton 54 Roberto Osuna 55 Ryan Pressly 60 Dallas Keuchel 63 Josh James
- Catchers: 11 Evan Gattis 15 Martín Maldonado 16 Brian McCann
- Infielders: 1 Carlos Correa 2 Alex Bregman 9 Marwin González 10 Yuli Gurriel 13 Tyler White 27 Jose Altuve
- Outfielders: 4 George Springer 6 Jake Marisnick 18 Tony Kemp 22 Josh Reddick

== Roster ==
2018 Houston Astros
Roster
Pitchers: 45 Gerrit Cole; 67 Dean Deetz; 47 Chris Devenski; 53 Ken Giles; 64 Reymin Guduan; 36 Will Harris; 51 James Hoyt; 63 Josh James; 60 Dallas Keuchel; 43 Lance McCullers Jr.; 31 Collin McHugh; 50 Charlie Morton; 54 Roberto Osuna; 41 Brad Peacock; 59 Cionel Pérez; 55 Ryan Pressly; 30 Héctor Rondón; 29 Tony Sipp; 38 Joe Smith; 65 Framber Valdez; 35 Justin Verlander	Catchers: 19 Tim Federowicz; 11 Evan Gattis; 15 Martín Maldonado; 16 Brian McCann; 12 Max Stassi; Infielders: 27 Jose Altuve; 2 Alex Bregman; 1 Carlos Correa; 28 J. D. Davis; 10 Yuli Gurriel; 23 A. J. Reed; 13 Tyler White	Outfielders: 21 Derek Fisher; 9 Marwin González; 18 Tony Kemp; 6 Jake Marisnick; 22 Josh Reddick; 4 George Springer; 26 Myles Straw; 3 Kyle Tucker	Manager: 14 A. J. Hinch; Coaches: 46 Jeff Albert (assistant hitting); 85 Javier Bracamonte (bullpen catcher); 37 Alex Cintrón (first base); 20 Joe Espada (bench); 39 Dave Hudgens (hitting); 8 Gary Pettis (third base); 56 Brent Strom (pitching); 55 Doug White (bullpen)

== Awards and achievements ==
=== Grand slams ===
No.	Date	Astros batter	Venue	Inning	Pitcher	Opposing team	Box
1	April 3	Josh Reddick	Minute Maid Park	7	Nestor Cortes	Baltimore Orioles	
2	April 21	Josh Reddick	Guaranteed Rate Field	2	Lucas Giolito	Chicago White Sox	
3	June 15	Evan Gattis	Kauffman Stadium	6 (Note: Tied score or took lead)	Jakob Junis	Kansas City Royals	
4	June 24	Yuli Gurriel	Minute Maid Park	2	Jason Hammel	Kansas City Royals	
5	July 21	George Springer	Angel Stadium	6	Noé Ramirez	Los Angeles Angels	
6	August 24	Marwin González	Angel Stadium	5	Andrew Heaney	Los Angeles Angels	
7	September 21	Yuli Gurriel	Minute Maid Park	1	Andrew Heaney	Los Angeles Angels	

=== Awards ===
2018 Houston Astros award winners
Name of award		Recipient	Ref.
American League (AL) Pitcher of the Month	May	Justin Verlander	
American League (AL) Player of the Month	June	Alex Bregman	
American League (AL) Player of the Week	April 15	Justin Verlander	
American League (AL) Player of the Week	June 17	Evan Gattis	
American League (AL) Player of the Week	July 1	Alex Bregman	
American League (AL) Player of the Week	September 16	Justin Verlander	
American League (AL) Player of the Week	September 23	Yuli Gurriel	
Darryl Kile Good Guy Award		Charlie Morton	
ESPY Award Best Team		2017–18 Houston Astros	
Fred Hartman Award for Long and Meritorious Service to Baseball		Willie Berry	
Gold Glove Award	Pitcher	Dallas Keuchel	
Houston-Area Major League Player of the Year	ARI	Paul Goldschmidt	
Houston Astros	Most Valuable Player (MVP)	Alex Bregman	
Houston Astros	Pitcher of the Year	Justin Verlander	
Houston Astros	Rookie of the Year	Max Stassi	
MLB All-Star Game	Starting second baseman	Jose Altuve	
MLB All-Star Game	Reserve third baseman	Alex Bregman	
MLB All-Star Game	Home Run Derby contestant	Alex Bregman	
MLB All-Star Game	Reserve outfielder	George Springer	
MLB All-Star Game	Reserve pitcher	Justin Verlander	
MLB All-Star Game	Reserve pitcher	Gerrit Cole	
MLB All-Star Game	Reserve pitcher	Charlie Morton	
MLB All-Star Game	Manager	A. J. Hinch	
MLB All-Star Game Most Valuable Player Award (ASG MVP)		Alex Bregman	
Silver Slugger Award	Second baseman	Jose Altuve	

Other awards results

Name of award	Voting recipient(s) (Team)	Ref.
AL Cy Young Award	1st—Snell (TBR) • 2nd—Verlander (HOU) • 5th—Cole (HOU)	
AL Manager of the Year	1st—Melvin (OAK) • 4th—Hinch (HOU)	
AL Most Valuable Player	1st—Betts (BOS) • 5th—Bregman (HOU) • 10th—Verlander (HOU); Other Astros: 13th—Altuve	
Heart & Hustle	Winner—Betts (BOS) • Nominee—Bregman (HOU)	
Roberto Clemente	Winner—Molina (STL) • Nominee—Morton (HOU)	

=== League leaders ===
AL batting leaders

- Double plays grounded into: Yuli Gurriel (22)
- Doubles: Alex Bregman (51—led MLB)
- Sacrifice flies: Carlos Correa (11—led MLB)

AL pitching leaders

- Batters faced: Dallas Keuchel (874—led MLB)
- Games played: Ryan Pressly (77—includes totals with Minnesota Twins)
- Games started: Dallas Keuchel & Justin Verlander (34—tied)
- Huts allowed: Dallas Keuchel (211—led MLB)
- Shutouts: Gerrit Cole & Justin Verlander {1—tied for MLB lead)
- Strikeout-to-walk ratio (K/BB): Justin Verlander (7.143)
- Strikeouts: Justin Verlander (290)
- Strikeouts per nine innings pitched (K/9): Gerrit Cole (13.818—led MLB)
- Walks plus hits per inning pitched (WHIP): Justin Verlander (0.902—led MLB)
- Winning percentage: Charlie Morton (.833—led MLB)

=== Milestones ===
==== Major League debuts ====
Player—Appeared at position

- Kyle Tucker, left fielder
- Framber Valdez, relief pitcher
- Josh James, starting pitcher
Date and opponent

- July 7 vs CHI
- August 21 vs SEA
- September 1 vs LAA
Box

Also:

== Minor league system ==
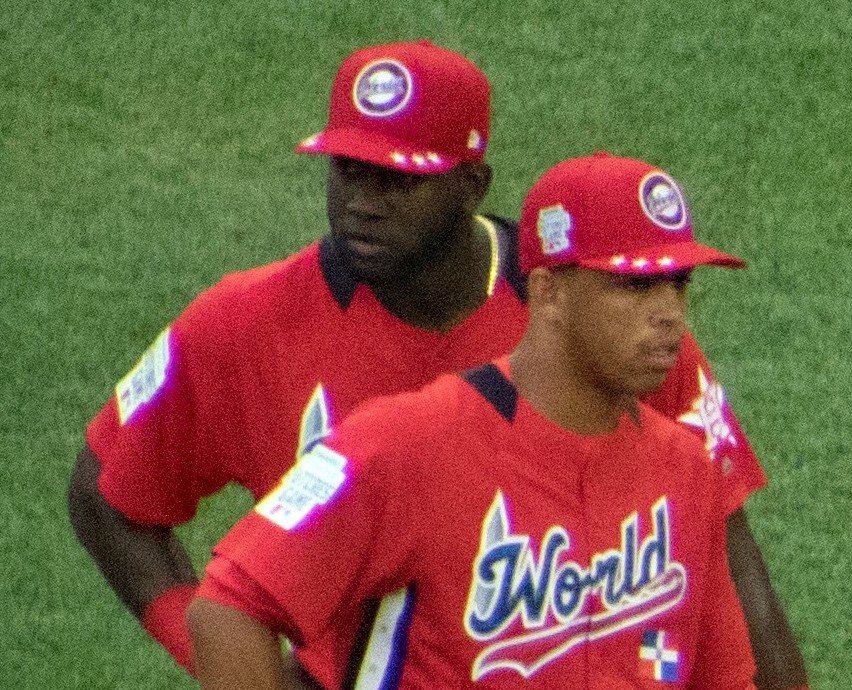
Yordan Alvarez (left) and Luis García at the 2018 All-Star Futures Game.

Level	Team	League	Manager
AAA	Fresno Grizzlies	Pacific Coast League	Rodney Linares
AA	Corpus Christi Hooks	Texas League	Omar López
A-Advanced	Buies Creek Astros	Carolina League	Morgan Ensberg
A	Quad Cities River Bandits	Midwest League	Mickey Storey
A-Short Season	Tri-City ValleyCats	New York–Penn League	Jason Bell
Rookie	GCL Astros	Gulf Coast League	Wladimir Sutil
Rookie	DSL Astros	Dominican Summer League	Charlie Romero (Blue); Carlos Lugo (Orange)

Awards

- All-Star Futures Game: Yordan Alvarez
- Pacific Coast League All-Star—First baseman: A. J. Reed
- Texas League Manager of the Year: Omar López
- Triple-A All-Star Team—Outfielder: Kyle Tucker
- Triple-A Player of the Year: Kyle Tucker

== See also ==
- Game scores of 100 in a 9-inning MLB game
- List of Major League Baseball 100 win seasons
- List of Major League Baseball All-Star Game managers
- List of Major League Baseball annual doubles leaders
- List of Major League Baseball annual shutout leaders
- List of Major League Baseball annual strikeout leaders
- List of Major League Baseball franchise postseason streaks
- List of Major League Baseball postseason sweeps
- List of Major League Baseball single-game hits leaders
- List of Major League Baseball titles leaders
