= Emily B. Smith =

Dean of Altus Junior College
- In office 1933–1940

Personal details
- Born: September 3, 1904 Murfreesboro, Tennessee, United States
- Died: August 21, 1975 (aged 70) Amarillo, Texas, United States
- Education: University of Science and Arts of Oklahoma; University of Oklahoma

Emily B. Smith (September 3, 1904 – August 21, 1975) was an American educator who served as the dean of Altus Junior College from 1933 to 1940.

== Biography ==
Emily B. Smith was born on September 3, 1904, near Murfreesboro, Tennessee, to Byron Frances and Anneta Duggin Smith. The family later moved to Oklahoma Territory where her father was a rancher. She had polio while young and was left with a lifelong limp. She graduated from the University of Science and Arts of Oklahoma and the University of Oklahoma. After graduation she worked as a teacher in Lincoln County, Eldorado, and Altus. In 1933, she was hired as dean for Altus Junior College. Between 1933 and 1940 she grew enrollment from 27 students to 600 students. She died on August 21, 1975, in Amarillo, Texas. She is buried in the Altus Cemetery.
