= Lance McCullers Jr. =

American baseball player (born 1993)

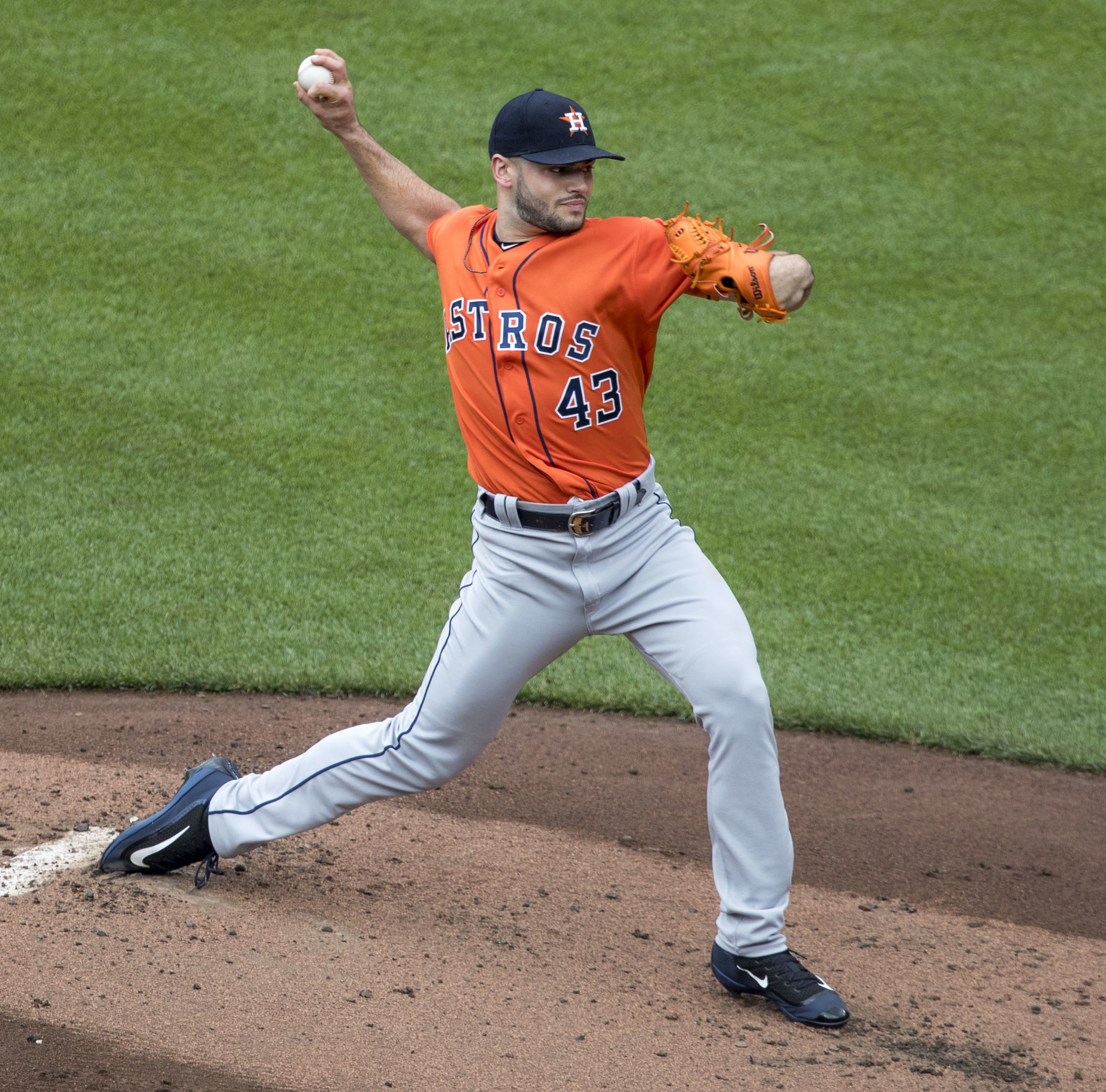
- McCullers with the Houston Astros in 2017

Free agent
- Pitcher
- Born: October 2, 1993 (age 33); Tampa, Florida, U.S.
- Bats: Left Throws: Right

MLB debut
- May 18, 2015, for the Houston Astros

MLB statistics (through 2026 season)
- Win–loss record: 53–40
- Earned run average: 3.85
- Strikeouts: 909
- Stats at Baseball Reference

Teams
- Houston Astros (2015–2018, 2020–2022, 2025–2026); Milwaukee Brewers (2026)

Career highlights and awards
- All-Star (2017); 2× World Series champion (2017, 2022)

Lance Graye McCullers Jr. (born October 2, 1993) is an American professional baseball pitcher who is a free agent. He has previously played in Major League Baseball (MLB) for the Houston Astros and Milwaukee Brewers. The Astros selected McCullers in the first round of the 2012 MLB draft. He made his MLB debut in 2015 and was an All-Star in 2017.

== High school ==
McCullers graduated from Jesuit High School in Tampa, Florida. He was named the Gatorade National Baseball Player of the Year in 2012.

== Professional career ==
=== Draft and minor leagues ===
The Houston Astros selected McCullers in the first round, with the 41st overall selection, of the 2012 MLB draft. He signed for a $2.5 million signing bonus. In eight games playing for the Astros’ rookie ball affiliates, McCuller Jr. had a 3.46 ERA with a 0-4 record.

McCullers pitched for the Quad Cities River Bandits of the Single-A Midwest League in 2013, for whom he was 6–5, as the team won the Midwest League championship. For the 2014 season, McCullers was 3–6 in the minor leagues, and was promoted to the Lancaster JetHawks of the High-A California League.

McCullers began the 2015 season with the Corpus Christi Hooks of the Double-A Texas League. The Astros promoted him to the Fresno Grizzlies of the Triple-A Pacific Coast League on May 14, and, on the following day, announced that he would make his major league debut on May 18.

=== Houston Astros ===
==== 2015–2016 ====
In his major league debut on May 18, 2015, McCullers allowed one run, three walks and three hits while striking out five batters in 4 2/3 innings and took a no-decision in the Astros' 2–1 loss to the Oakland Athletics. McCullers threw his first career complete game against the Baltimore Orioles on June 3, 2015, reaching 11 strikeouts for the first time. He remained in the Astros rotation and finished with 22 starts.

McCullers began the 2016 season on the disabled list with shoulder soreness. He finished the season 6–5 in 14 starts.

==== 2017 ====
The Astros assigned McCullers to the starting rotation at the outset of 2017 season. From May 6–23, he delivered 22 scoreless innings, which among Astros pitchers, was the longest scoreless inning streak since Roy Oswalt completed 32 from August 27 through September 11, 2008. In that same span, McCullers also became the first Astros pitcher since Nolan Ryan in 1984 to allow no earned runs over at least five innings pitched in each of four consecutive appearances.

For the month of May, McCullers won his first American League (AL) Pitcher of the Month Award. He was credited with a 4–0 record over six starts. He permitted an AL-leading 0.99 earned run average (ERA), 21 hits, and a .164 batting average against (BAA) with 37 strikeouts. He also ranked second in wins, third in BAA, and tied for fifth in strikeouts.

The Astros placed McCullers on the disabled list (DL) due to a back injury, and he returned on June 24. He was selected to the All-Star Game, finishing the first half of the season with a record of 7–2 and 106 strikeouts. With a recurring back injury, McCullers returned to the DL after July 30, after posting a 7.45 ERA and 1–5 record in between DL stints.

On October 21, 2017, McCullers pitched four scoreless innings in relief and earned his first career save in a 4–0 win over the New York Yankees in Game 7 of the ALCS, which notably saw him throw 24 straight curveballs. This sent the Astros to their first World Series since 2005 to face the Los Angeles Dodgers. In a key moment in this game, after losing command and walking a batter, he threw 24 consecutive curveballs to retire the last six Yankees in a row. In the World Series, McCullers drew the start in Game 3 and again in Game 7, producing an RBI groundout in the top 2nd. The Astros won the Series in the seventh game for the first title in franchise history.

==== 2018–2020 ====
McCullers began the 2018 season in the rotation. He started on July 6, 2018, by holding the Chicago White Sox hitless for the first 5 1/3 innings on the way to setting a career-high with 12 strikeouts over 7 innings. He finished with 1 run allowed on 3 hits. McCullers compiled a 10–6 W–L record through 22 starts before landing on the disabled list on August 5 with discomfort in his right elbow. After missing more than a month because of the injury, he returned towards the last two weeks of the regular season in a bullpen role, appearing in three games. He threw a curve 47.4% of the time, tops in MLB.

On November 6, 2018, McCullers underwent Tommy John surgery to repair a torn UCL in his right elbow and was ruled out for the entire 2019 baseball season. He completed his rehab from Tommy John surgery in early November 2019.

In 2020, McCullers was 3–3 with a 3.93 ERA. He pitched 55 innings with 56 strikeouts in 11 starts.

==== 2021 ====
On March 24, 2021, McCullers and the Astros agreed to a five-year, $85 million contract extension that included a $3.5 million signing bonus. McCullers finished the 2021 season with a 13–5 record, a 3.16 ERA, and 185 strikeouts in 162 1/3 innings over 28 starts. He led the major leagues with 76 walks and 4.21 walks per 9 innings. He established new career highs or career bests to that point in his career in numerous categories, including in ERA, games won, games started, strikeouts, innings pitched, batters faced (684), hits per nine innings allowed (H/9, 6.8), and home runs per nine innings (HR/9, 0.7). Among qualified pitchers, he led the AL in H/9 and HR/9, and ranked second in ERA.

Following the regular season, the Houston chapter of the Baseball Writers' Association of America (BBWAA) named McCullers the Astros' team Pitcher of the Year, his first such award.

During the 2021 ALDS versus the Chicago White Sox, McCullers was removed from Game 4 due to a right forearm injury. He was unable to participate in the remainder of the playoffs, in the which the Astros reached the World Series, and were defeated by the Atlanta Braves in six games.

==== 2022 ====
Still recovering from the forearm injury, McCullers was diagnosed with a right flexor tendon strain, and was unable to throw in spring training and missed the start of the 2022 season. On August 13, he made his season debut and earned the win after hurling six shutout innings versus the Oakland Athletics. He allowed two hits, walked four, and struck out five. McCullers went 5 2/3 innings on September 2, allowing two runs, six hits, four walks and striking out seven to earn the win in a 4–2 final versus Los Angeles. He hurled six innings on September 15, issuing four walks, two hits, and two runs as he struck out 11 Athletics, his most since July 29, 2018. On September 21, McCullers worked seven innings versus his hometown Tampa Bay Rays and was the winning pitcher, allowing two runs to lead the Astros in a 5–2 final score for the series sweep, their first-ever at Tropicana Field.

In 2022 for Houston, McCullers was 4–2 with a 2.27 ERA in 47 2/3 innings in which he struck out 50 batters in eight starts.

In Game 3 of the ALDS, McCullers hurled the first six innings of a major league postseason-record 18-inning shutout and series-clinching sweep of the Mariners. The game remained scoreless for an unprecedented 17 innings in postseason history—until rookie Jeremy Peña homered in the top of the 18th to eventually win it for the Astros, 1–0. In Game 4 of the ALCS, he tossed 5 innings and allowed 3 runs to receive a no-decision as the Astros rallied to defeat the Yankees, 6–5, for the clinching game and series sweep. In Game 3 of the World Series versus the Philadelphia Phillies, McCullers became the first pitcher in postseason history to allow five home runs in a game. However, the Astros claimed the championship in six games to give McCullers his second World Series title.

==== 2023–2026 ====
During spring training in 2023, McCullers developed a muscle strain in his right arm, and was shut down from throwing until fully recovered. As a result, he missed the start of the regular season. On June 14, 2023, he underwent season–ending surgery to repair the flexor tendon in his pitching arm and remove a bone spur. After he was shut down from throwing in July 2024 while rehabbing, the Astros announced that McCullers would also miss the entire 2024 season.

On January 25, 2025, it was announced that McCullers would likely not be ready for Opening Day. After a 915-day absence, he made his season debut on May 4, 2025, at Rate Field versus the White Sox, and tossed 3 2/3 scoreless innings with three hits, three walks allowed, and four strikeouts. However, he surrendered 7 first-inning runs to the Cincinnati Reds in his second start, which led to the eighth time in Astros franchise history that they had been scored upon at least 10 times in a single inning. McCullers rebounded on May 28, matched his career-high of 12 strikeouts against the Athletics, yielding 3 runs over 6 innings as the Astros eventually mounted a comeback and won, 5–3. He earned his 50th career win on June 3—and first since September 21, 2022—tossing six shutout innings while outdueling Paul Skenes in a 3–0 win versus the Pittsburgh Pirates.

=== Milwaukee Brewers ===
On July 15, 2026, the Astros traded McCullers, Colton Gordon, and cash to the Milwaukee Brewers in exchange for Jadyn Fielder. In two appearances for the team, he recorded a 3.86 ERA with five strikeouts across 4 2/3 innings pitched. McCullers was designated for assignment by the Brewers on July 26. He was released by Milwaukee the following day.

== Personal life ==
McCullers' father, Lance Sr., also pitched in Major League Baseball, for the San Diego Padres, New York Yankees, Detroit Tigers, and Texas Rangers, from 1985 to 1992. He is of Cuban descent through his mother.

McCullers is a Catholic and spoke about his faith in a video for the Astros' Faith and Family Night in 2015. McCullers married his longtime girlfriend in December 2015. Their first child was born in December 2019. In 2016, the Lance McCullers Jr. Foundation, a non-profit organization, was established by McCullers and his family to advocate for stray and homeless animals.

During the 2025 MLB season, McCullers and his family were the recipients of physical threats related to his play from an intoxicated gambler located outside the United States.

== See also ==
- Houston Astros award winners and league leaders
- List of Major League Baseball single-inning strikeout leaders
- List of second-generation Major League Baseball players
- List of World Series starting pitchers

Awards and achievements
Preceded by Dallas Keuchel	American League Pitcher of the Month; May 2017	Succeeded by Corey Kluber
