= Jake Marisnick =

American baseball player (born 1991)

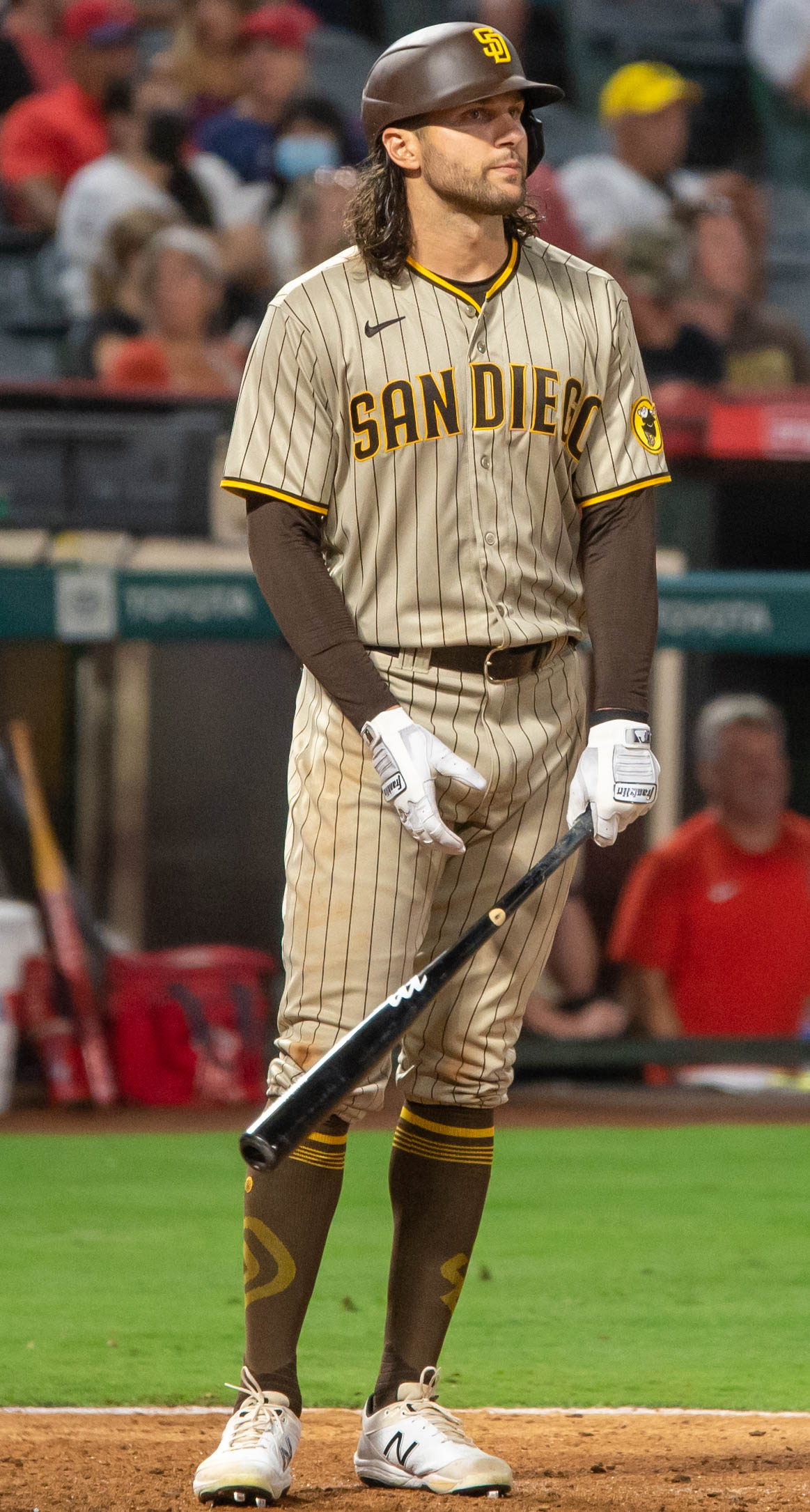
- Marisnick with the San Diego Padres in 2021
- Center fielder
- Born: March 30, 1991 (age 35); Riverside, California, U.S.
- Batted: Right Threw: Right

MLB debut
- July 23, 2013, for the Miami Marlins

Last MLB appearance
- July 18, 2023, for the Los Angeles Dodgers

MLB statistics
- Batting average: .228
- Home runs: 65
- Runs batted in: 223
- Stats at Baseball Reference

Teams
- Miami Marlins (2013–2014); Houston Astros (2014–2019); New York Mets (2020); Chicago Cubs (2021); San Diego Padres (2021); Pittsburgh Pirates (2022); Chicago White Sox (2023); Detroit Tigers (2023); Los Angeles Dodgers (2023)

Jacob Shawn Marisnick (born March 30, 1991) is an American former professional baseball center fielder. He played in Major League Baseball (MLB) for the Chicago Cubs, Miami Marlins, Houston Astros, New York Mets, San Diego Padres, Pittsburgh Pirates, Chicago White Sox, Detroit Tigers, and Los Angeles Dodgers. The Toronto Blue Jays drafted Marisnick in the third round of the 2009 MLB draft.

== Early career ==
Marisnick attended Riverside Polytechnic High School in Riverside, California. He excelled for the school's baseball team, and was initially expected to be a first-round choice in the upcoming Major League Baseball (MLB) Draft. However, he struggled during showcase events, and had a .406 batting average as a senior, lower than his batting average in his sophomore and junior years. He committed to attend the University of Oregon on a college baseball scholarship.

== Professional career ==
=== Toronto Blue Jays ===
==== Minor leagues ====
The Toronto Blue Jays drafted Marisnick in the third round, with the 104th overall selection, of the 2009 Major League Baseball draft. Rather than attend Oregon, Marisnick signed with the Blue Jays, receiving a $1 million signing bonus, more than double the suggested bonus for a player drafted at that position. He made his professional debut in 2010, splitting the season between the rookie-level Gulf Coast League Blue Jays and Single-A Lansing Lugnuts. In 69 games split between the two affiliates, Marisnick batted a cumulative .253/.336/.398 with four home runs, 26 RBI, and 23 stolen bases.

Marisnick returned to Lansing for the 2011 season, playing in 118 games and hitting .320/.392/.496 with career-highs in home runs (14), RBI (77), and stolen bases (37). Before the 2012 season, MLB.com rated Marisnick as the 58th-best prospect in baseball. He made 120 appearances split between the High-A Dunedin Blue Jays and Double-A New Hampshire Fisher Cats, slashing a combined .250/.321/.399 with eight home runs, 50 RBI, and 24 stolen bases.

=== Miami Marlins ===
On November 19, 2012, Marisnick was traded to the Miami Marlins along with Adeiny Hechavarria, Henderson Álvarez, Yunel Escobar, Jeff Mathis, Anthony DeSclafani, and Justin Nicolino, in exchange for Mark Buehrle, Josh Johnson, José Reyes, John Buck, and Emilio Bonifacio. On January 29, 2013, Marisnick was named number 70 on MLB's Top 100 Prospects list.

==== Major leagues ====
On July 23, 2013, the Marlins promoted Marisnick and Christian Yelich to the major leagues from the Double-A Jacksonville Suns. Marisnick recorded his first major league hit on July 26, off Pittsburgh Pirates pitcher Jeff Locke. Marisnick hit his first career home run in a game against Jenrry Mejía of the New York Mets on July 31.

The Marlins optioned Marisnick to the New Orleans Zephyrs of the Triple–A Pacific Coast League on March 27, 2014. He was recalled on June 16 when Yelich was added to the disabled list.

=== Houston Astros ===
On July 31, 2014, the Marlins traded Marisnick, Colin Moran, Francis Martes, and a compensatory draft pick to the Houston Astros for Jarred Cosart, Enrique Hernández, and Austin Wates. Marisnick played in 51 games for the Astros in 2014, compiling a batting average of .272 with 3 home runs, 19 RBI, and 6 stolen bases. He also displayed strong defense while playing the outfield, with a fielding percentage of .984 and a range factor of 2.57.

He made his first opening day MLB start for the Astros on April 6, 2015. He finished the 2015 season with an average of .236 and OPS of .665 over 133 games and 339 at bats.

After a slow start to the 2016 season he was optioned to the Triple-A affiliate of the Astros, the Fresno Grizzlies of the Pacific Coast League, on April 25, 2016. Marisnick was recalled by the Houston Astros on May 5. After former Astros center fielder Carlos Gómez was designated for assignment, Marisnick and Tony Kemp began sharing center field duties in his place.

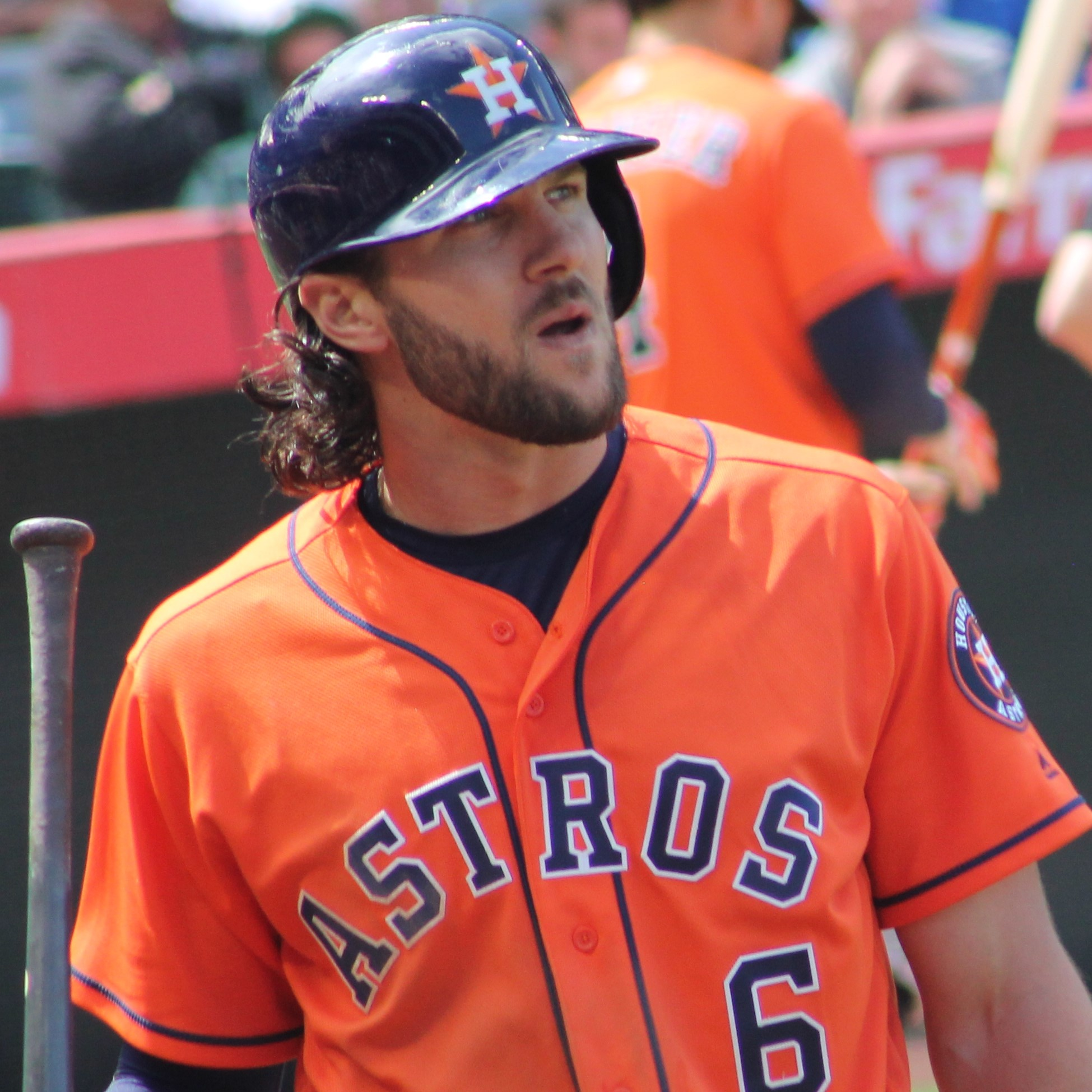
Marisnick with the Astros in 2017

In 106 games of 2017, Marisnick finished with a .243 batting average, 16 home runs, and 35 RBI. With the Astros finishing the year 101–61, the team clinched the AL West pennant, and eventually won the 2017 World Series, their first ever. Marisnick did not participate in any postseason action due to injury, but was still on the 40-man roster at the time, and won his first championship title.

On July 7, 2018, Marisnick was sent down to Triple–A for the second time in the season, after struggling at the plate. In 2018 with Houston he batted .211/.275/.399 with 10 home runs and 28 RBI.

On July 7, 2019, while attempting to score on a fly out, Marisnick collided with catcher Jonathan Lucroy of the Los Angeles Angels at home plate and was called out for violating Official Baseball Rule 6.01(i). Lucroy had a concussion and a broken nose as a result of the collision, and Marisnick was suspended for two games for the violation (pending appeal), although the collision was deemed unintentional. On July 18, at an away game against the Angels, Marisnick was hit by a pitch by Angels reliever Noé Ramirez in the high back, though the pitch was going for his head. Marisnick did not charge the mound or retaliate but went to 1st base. At first base first baseman Albert Pujols had an argument with the angered Astros dugout. Ramirez and Angels manager Brad Ausmus were suspended, Ramirez for three games and Ausmus for one. On July 29, it was announced that Marisnick had lost his appeal for his two-game suspension. In 2019 for Houston, he batted .233/.289/.411 with 10 home runs and 34 RBI in 292 at-bats. Marisnick was the Astros' 2019 nominee for the Heart & Hustle Award.

=== New York Mets ===
On December 5, 2019, Marisnick was traded to the New York Mets in exchange for left-handed pitcher Blake Taylor and outfielder Kenedy Corona. Marisnick played in 16 games for the Mets in 2020, hitting .333/.353/.606 with 2 home runs over 33 at-bats.

=== Chicago Cubs ===
On February 20, 2021, Marisnick agreed to a one-year, $1.5 million contract with the Chicago Cubs. In 65 games for Chicago, Marisnick slashed .227/.294/.438 with five home runs, 22 RBI, and three stolen bases.

=== San Diego Padres ===
On July 30, 2021, Marisnick was traded to the San Diego Padres in exchange for Anderson Espinoza. In 34 appearances for San Diego, Marisnick hit .188/.264/.208 with no home runs, two RBI, and one stolen base.

=== Pittsburgh Pirates ===
On March 14, 2022, Marisnick signed a minor league deal with the Texas Rangers. Marisnick was released by the Rangers organization on April 5.

On April 6, Marisnick signed a one year major league deal with the Pittsburgh Pirates. Marisnick underwent thumb surgery after suffering an injury while making diving catch in the outfield during a game on May 9 against the Los Angeles Dodgers. He was activated from the injured list on July 11, and slotted into the lineup as the starting center fielder against the Miami Marlins. On August 7, Marisnick was released by the Pirates.

=== Atlanta Braves ===
On August 31, 2022, Marisnick signed a minor league deal with the Atlanta Braves. In 17 games for the Triple-A Gwinnett Stripers down the stretch, Marisnick slashed .235/.297/.324 with one home run and 3 RBI. He elected free agency following the season on November 10.

=== Chicago White Sox ===
On January 10, 2023, Marisnick signed a minor league contract with the Chicago White Sox organization. He began the year with the Triple-A Charlotte Knights, where he played in 30 games and batted .264/.407/.391 with 1 home run, 9 RBI, and 8 stolen bases. On May 10, his contract was selected to the active roster. Marisnick played in 9 games for Chicago, but went hitless in two plate appearances and played mainly as a defensive replacement. On May 21, he was designated for assignment following the promotion of Clint Frazier. He cleared waivers and was sent outright to Triple-A Charlotte on May 26.

=== Detroit Tigers ===
On May 30, 2023, Marisnick was traded to the Detroit Tigers in exchange for cash considerations and was assigned to the Triple-A Toledo Mud Hens. The following day, Marisnick was selected to the active roster to replace an injured Riley Greene. In 33 games for Detroit, he batted .232/.270/.420 with 2 home runs and 10 RBI. On July 9, 2023, Marisnick was designated for assignment by the Tigers after Trey Wingenter was activated from the injured list. On July 13, he cleared waivers and elected free agency in lieu of an outright assignment.

=== Los Angeles Dodgers ===
On July 13, 2023, the same day as his departure from the Tigers organization, Marisnick signed a major league contract with the Los Angeles Dodgers. After going 2–for–5 in four games for the Dodgers, he departed a game against the Baltimore Orioles on July 18 with an apparent injury. The next day, he was placed on the injured list with a left hamstring strain, with manager Dave Roberts announcing that he would miss at least three weeks as a result. On August 15, Marisnick was transferred to the 60–day injured list. He became a free agent following the season.

=== Los Angeles Angels ===
On December 20, 2023, Marisnick signed a minor league contract with the Los Angeles Angels. In 59 games split between the rookie-level Arizona Complex League Angels and Triple-A Salt Lake Bees, he batted .286/.371/.549 with 12 home runs, 33 RBI, and eight stolen bases. Marisnick elected free agency following the season on November 4, 2024.

=== Atlanta Braves (second stint) ===
On February 13, 2025, Marisnick signed a minor league contract with the Atlanta Braves. In 12 games for the Triple-A Gwinnett Stripers, he went 4-for-41 (.098) with one home run, one RBI, and one stolen base. Marisnick was released by the Braves organization on April 28.
