= Marwin González =

Venezuelan baseball player (born 1989)

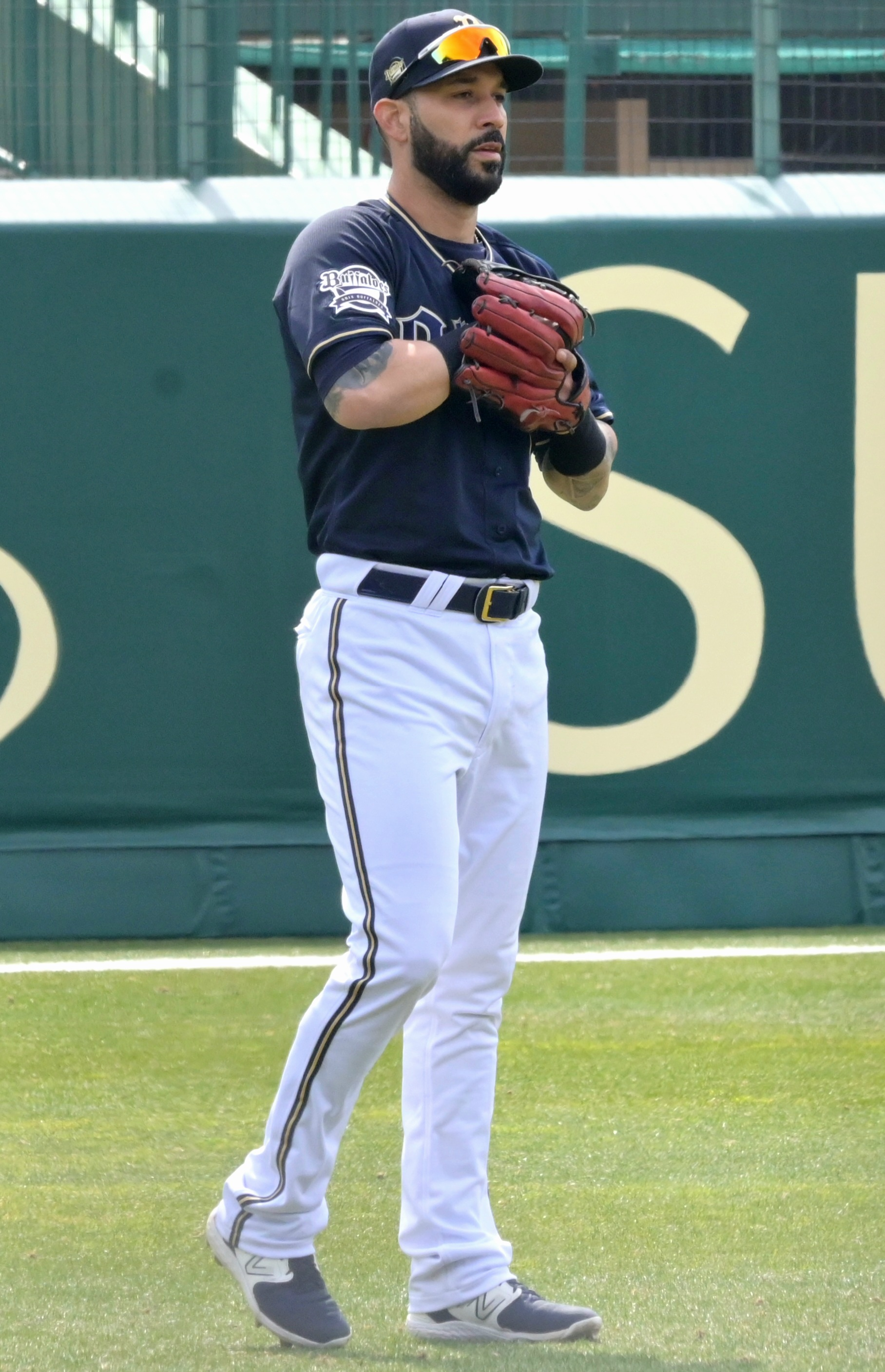
- González with the Orix Buffaloes in 2023
- Utility player
- Born: March 14, 1989 (age 37); Puerto Ordaz, Venezuela
- Batted: Switch Threw: Right

Professional debut
- MLB: April 6, 2012, for the Houston Astros
- NPB: March 31, 2023, for the Orix Buffaloes

Last appearance
- MLB: October 5, 2022, for the New York Yankees
- NPB: September 25, 2024, for the Orix Buffaloes

MLB statistics
- Batting average: .252
- Home runs: 107
- Runs batted in: 415

NPB statistics
- Batting average: .203
- Home runs: 13
- Runs batted in: 40
- Stats at Baseball Reference

Teams
- Houston Astros (2012–2018); Minnesota Twins (2019–2020); Boston Red Sox (2021); Houston Astros (2021); New York Yankees (2022); Orix Buffaloes (2023–2024)

Career highlights and awards
- World Series champion (2017)

Marwin Javier González (born March 14, 1989) is a Venezuelan former professional baseball utility player. He played in Major League Baseball (MLB) for the Houston Astros, Minnesota Twins, Boston Red Sox, and New York Yankees, and in Nippon Professional Baseball (NPB) for the Orix Buffaloes. González was signed as an international free agent by the Chicago Cubs in 2005. He made his MLB debut with the Astros in 2012, and won the World Series with the team in 2017. González has appeared at every position in MLB except for catcher.

== Professional career ==
=== Chicago Cubs ===
==== Minor leagues ====
González was signed as an international free agent by the Chicago Cubs on November 23, 2005. From 2006 through 2011, he played in the Cubs' farm system, reaching the Triple-A level in 2011 with the Iowa Cubs. He was an infielder through 2008, then also started to play as an outfielder in 2009.

=== Houston Astros ===
On December 8, 2011, the Boston Red Sox selected González from the Cubs in the Rule 5 draft, and then traded him to the Houston Astros in exchange for pitcher Marco Duarte.

==== Major leagues ====
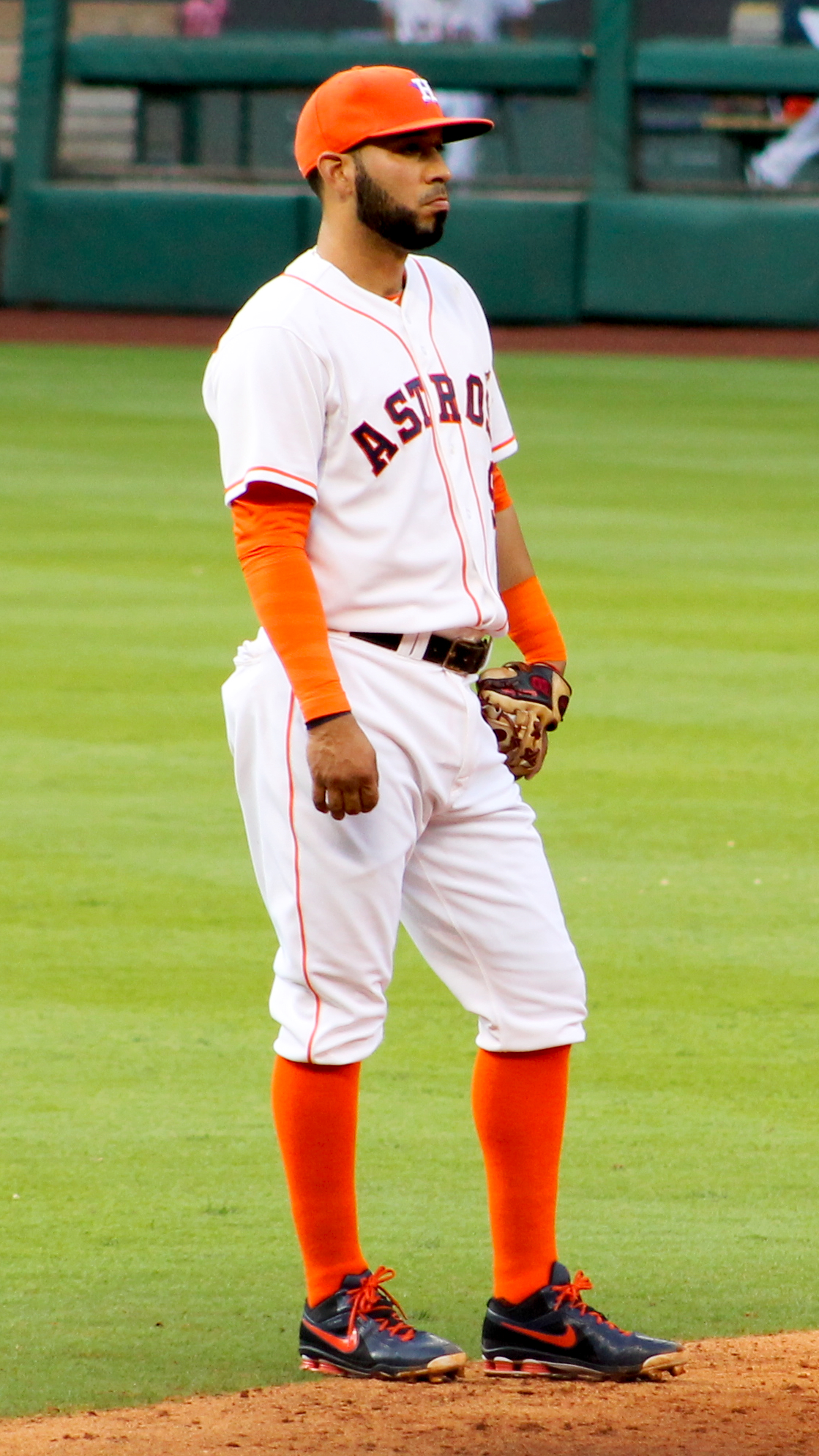
González with the Houston Astros in 2014

In 2012, González made the Astros' Opening Day roster. He played 80 games with the Astros and 13 games in Triple-A with the Oklahoma City RedHawks. With Houston, he batted .234 with two home runs and 12 runs batted in (RBIs). During 2013, González again split time between MLB (72 games) and Triple-A (44 games). With the Astros on April 2, González broke up a perfect game bid by Yu Darvish of the Texas Rangers with two outs in the bottom of the ninth inning. For the season with Houston, he batted .221 with four home runs and 14 RBIs.

González spent all of the next five seasons in MLB, with Houston. From 2014 through 2016, he batted a combined .268 with 31 home runs and 108 RBIs in 364 games. On August 18, 2015, González went 3-for-4 with a doubled and belted his first career walk-off home run in the bottom of the tenth off All-Star closer Brad Boxberger, giving the Astros a 3–2 win over the Tampa Bay Rays. He set a major league record by hitting his first 25 MLB home runs with no one on base. That streak was broken when he hit a home run on May 6, 2016, with Evan Gattis on second base.

In 2017, González had a slash line of .303/.377/.530, while seeing the lowest percentage of fastballs of all MLB hitters (45.7%). He received six votes in AL MVP balloting, finishing 19th. In Game 2 of the 2017 World Series, González hit a home run in the ninth inning off of Los Angeles Dodgers closer Kenley Jansen to tie the score at 3–3, as the Astros went on to win in 11 innings, 7–6. The World Series lasted seven games, and the Astros became MLB champions for the first time in franchise history. In 2020, it was revealed during the Houston Astros sign stealing scandal that the Astros broke MLB rules during the 2017 season. Analysis of videos during the season found that González received more “bangs” than any other player on the team, and received bangs on the second highest percentage of pitches seen. Note that, since bangs indicated an off-speed or breaking pitch, this is to some extent expected for a player who sees fewer fastballs. González subsequently apologized for his role in the scandal.

In 2018, González slashed .247/.324/.409, and saw the highest percentage of curveballs (14.9%) of all MLB hitters. He decided not to re-sign with the Astros and became a free agent after the season.

Overall, in parts of seven seasons with Houston, González hit 76 home runs and 292 RBIs in 795 games, with a .264 batting average. Defensively, he played as an infielder during 2012 and 2013, and as both an infielder and outfielder thereafter. By the end of the 2016 season, he had appeared at every position for Houston except for pitcher and catcher. He played a career-high 92 games at one position—first base—in 2016.

=== Minnesota Twins ===
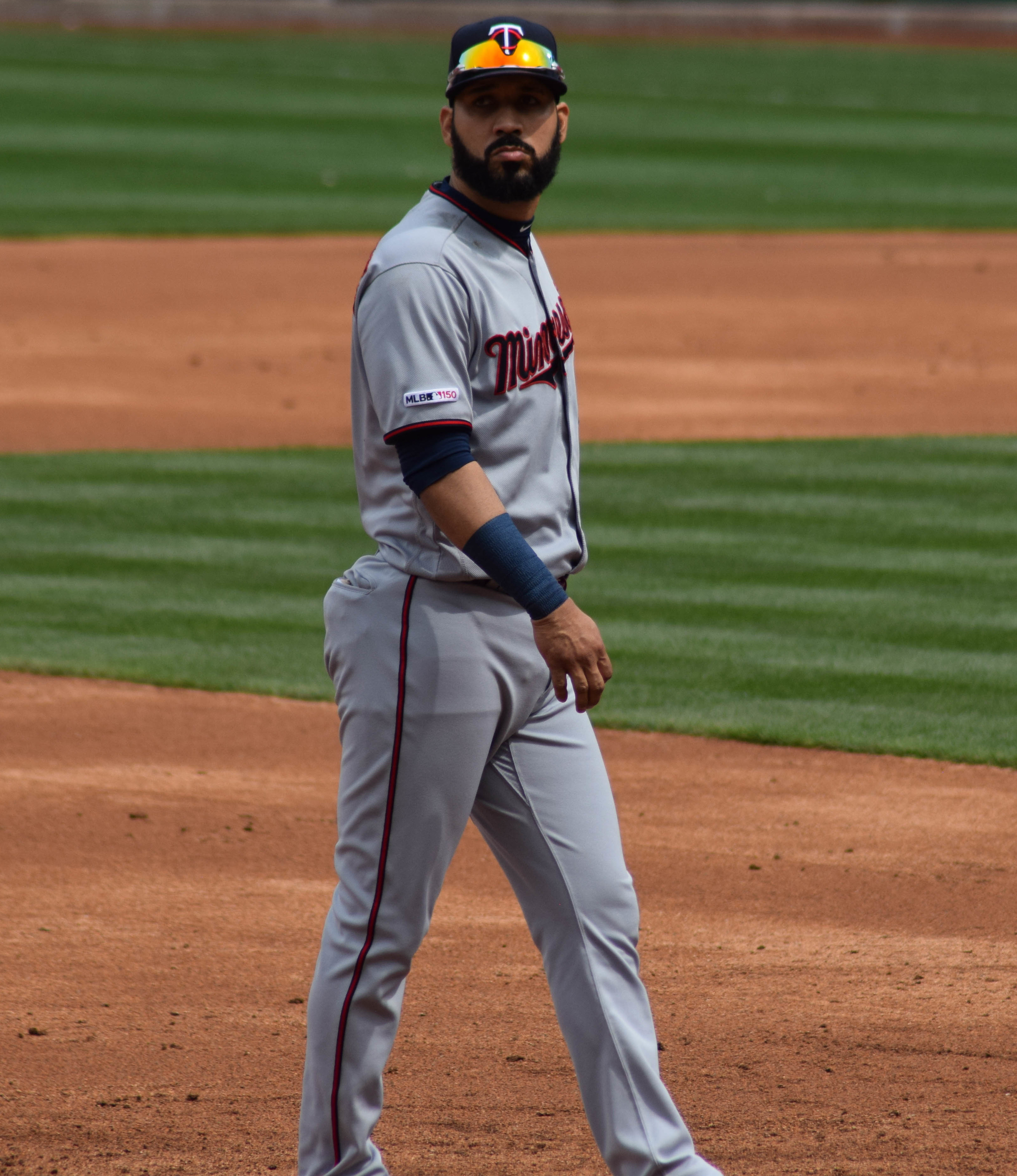
González with the Minnesota Twins in 2019

On February 25, 2019, González signed a two-year contract worth $21 million with the Minnesota Twins. During the 2019 season, he batted .264 with 15 home runs and 55 RBIs in 114 games.

In the shortened 2020 season, he appeared in 53 games while batting .211/.286/.320 with 5 home runs and 22 RBIs in 175 at bats. He became a free agent in late October 2020.

=== Boston Red Sox ===
On February 24, 2021, González signed a one-year, $3 million contract with the Boston Red Sox. González became the first player in modern major league history to start at four different positions in the field through his team's first four games of the season—he played left field on 2021 Opening Day for Boston before manning second base, third base, and first base in the ensuing contests, respectively. He made his first-ever pitching appearance in the eighth inning of a game against the Toronto Blue Jays on June 13, in which he allowed no runs to score. On July 16, he was placed on the injured list due to a right hamstring strain; he was activated on August 2. On August 13, González was designated for assignment by the Red Sox, and he was released by the team three days later. In 2021 with the Red Sox, he batted .202/.281/.285 in 242 at bats.

=== Houston Astros (second stint) ===
On August 27, 2021, González signed a minor league contract with the Astros. The Astros added him to their major league roster on September 5. In 2021 with the Astros, he batted .176/.222/.441 in 34 regular-season at bats. He also pinch hit four times, collecting one hit, during the World Series. On November 3, 2021, he was declared a free agent.

=== New York Yankees ===
On March 20, 2022, González signed a minor league contract with the New York Yankees. He made the Yankees Opening Day roster for the 2022 season.

In 2022 he batted .185/.255/.321 in 184 at bats, with six home runs and 18 RBIs. He slumped especially in the second half of the season, batting .110/.185/.233, and against power pitchers, batting .094/.186/.170.

=== Orix Buffaloes ===
On December 29, 2022, González signed with the Orix Buffaloes of Nippon Professional Baseball. He played in 84 games for Orix in 2023, hitting .217/.266/.385 with 12 home runs and 38 RBI. In Game 5 of the Japan Series, González hit a home run off of Hanshin Tigers starter Kotaro Otake. In doing so, he became the fifth player in baseball history to homer in the World Series and Japan Series, joining Johnny Logan, Roy White, Hideki Matsui, and Andruw Jones.

On September 26, 2024, the team announced he would retire at the end of the season.

== Personal life ==
González married his wife Noel in 2010. The couple have four children, Eliana, Brooks, Dallas and Isabella together and reside in Houston in the off season.

== See also ==
- List of Major League Baseball players from Venezuela
