= Western Oklahoma State College =

Community college in Altus, Oklahoma, U.S.

Coordinates: 34°40′08″N 99°20′14″W

- Motto: A Smart Start
- Type: Public community college
- Established: 1926
- President: Dr. Chad Wiginton
- Undergraduates: 1,151 (fall 2023)
- Location: Altus, Oklahoma, United States
- Colors: Green and Gold
- Nickname: Western
- Mascot: Pioneers
- Website: wosc.edu

Western Oklahoma State College is a public community college in Altus, Oklahoma.

== History ==
Western Oklahoma State College was founded in 1926 under the name Altus Junior College. In 1974 state legislature changed its name to the present Western Oklahoma State College, also known as WOSC.

In 2012, the Chronicle of Higher Education reported that NCAA athletes had allegedly been taking 10-day online courses from Western Oklahoma when they don't meet academic standards at their own institutions. Western Oklahoma former president Phil Birdine defended the program, saying the school was "not a course mill." The college ceased offering the courses in early 2013 after the Oklahoma State Regents for Higher Education recommended the courses be immediately discontinued. Nevertheless, the college's regional accreditor placed the college on probation in April after they "found the college's 10-day accelerated online courses don't meet quality and rigor standards required of compressed-format courses."

== Athletics ==
WOSC is involved in intercollegiate sports such as men's basketball, women's basketball, softball, baseball, rodeo, and cheerleading.

Under coach Kurt Russell, WOSC has recently built a highly successful baseball program. The school is especially noted for its success in recruiting Latino players from northeastern cities such as New York City and Philadelphia, and from Latin American countries. The team has made it to the national junior college Division II World Series in each of the last four seasons, and in 2011 WOSC defeated Mississippi's Jones County Junior College to win the national championship. Notably, multiple alumni have gone on to play professionally in MLB, including Andrelton Simmons, Josh James, Juan Perez, Casey Sadler, and Angel Castro.
