= Doug White (baseball) =

American baseball coach

- Coach

Teams
- As Coach: Houston Astros (2016–2018); Los Angeles Angels (2019)

Career highlights and awards
- World Series champion (2017)

Doug White is an American professional baseball coach. He has coached for the Houston Astros and Los Angeles Angels of Major League Baseball.

== Career ==
White worked for the St. Louis Cardinals organization as a minor league pitching coach for five years. In 2013, White joined the Astros' organization as the pitching coach for the Tri-City ValleyCats of the Class A-Short Season New York-Penn League. White spent the 2014 and 2015 seasons as a roving pitching instructor in the Astros' minor league system. In 2016, the Astros promoted White to minor league pitching coordinator. After the 2017 season, the Astros named White their major league bullpen coach.
