= Josh James (baseball) =

American baseball player (born 1993)

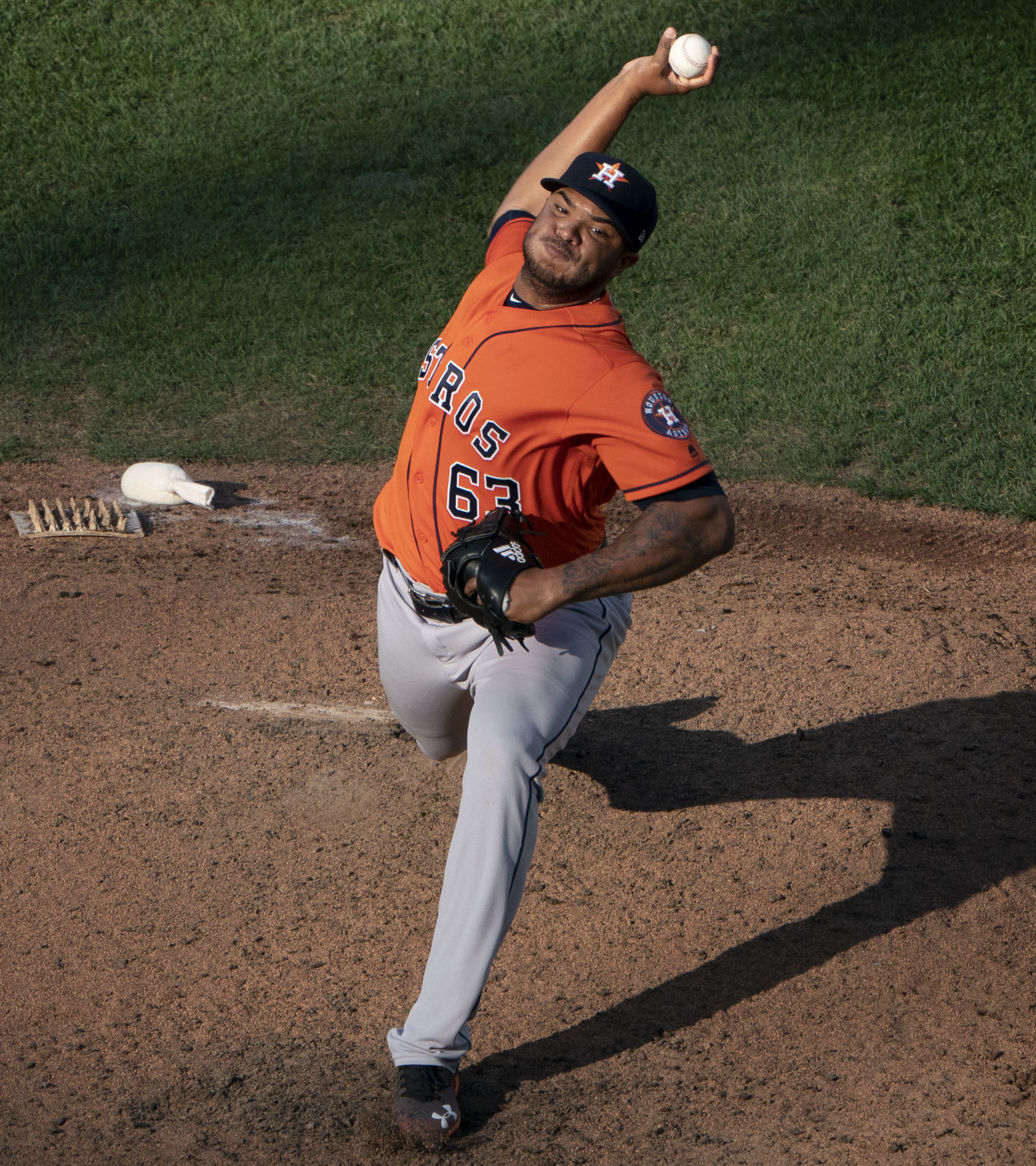
- James with the Houston Astros
- Pitcher
- Born: March 8, 1993 (age 33); Hollywood, Florida, U.S.
- Batted: Right Threw: Right

MLB debut
- September 1, 2018, for the Houston Astros

Last MLB appearance
- September 22, 2021, for the Houston Astros

MLB statistics
- Win–loss record: 8–1
- Earned run average: 4.64
- Strikeouts: 158
- Stats at Baseball Reference

Teams
- Houston Astros (2018–2021)

Joshua James (born March 8, 1993) is an American former professional baseball pitcher. He played in Major League Baseball (MLB) for the Houston Astros. He played college baseball at Barry University and Western Oklahoma State College before being selected in the 34th round of the 2014 MLB draft, and is best known for his fastball, which reached 102 miles per hour.

== Early life ==
Joshua Edward James was born to Ivan and Tricia James on March 8, 1993, in Hollywood, Florida. James' father, Ivan, is Puerto Rican and grew up on the island of St. Croix. James' mother, Tricia, was born on St. Thomas. James spent part of his childhood in the U.S. Virgin Islands along with his sister Joy.

James attended South Broward High School in Hollywood, Florida, a marine science magnet school, where he was a three-year letterman. There, he was primarily an infielder and did not begin pitching until the age of 16. One of his teammates at South Broward was Jose Marmolejos, who would also go on to play Major League Baseball for the Washington Nationals and Seattle Mariners. In addition to baseball, James was a member of the basketball, golf, and track teams at South Broward. He also briefly played tennis.

At Barry University in Miami Shores, Florida, James' coaches converted him to a pitcher exclusively, but he only pitched five innings in 2012. He majored in Sport Management while at Barry. After his freshman year, James decided to pursue another collegiate opportunity, citing a lack of playing time and an inability to secure a scholarship at Barry. Though he initially was seeking a program in his home state of Florida, James eventually transferred to Western Oklahoma State College, a NJCAA DII college in Altus, Oklahoma. He was put into contact with Western Oklahoma coach Kurt Russel through one of his former coaches in the Virgin Islands, Darren Canton. Prior to James' arrival at Western Oklahoma, the Pioneers had qualified for five straight NCJAA DII World Series, winning a national championship in 2011 and losing in the championship game in 2012. Other WOSC alumni who played in MLB include Andrelton Simmons, Casey Sadler, Juan Perez, and Angel Castro. While at Western Oklahoma, James attempted to switch back to the infielder position but was informed by his coaches that he would find more success as a pitcher. He redshirted the 2013 season and returned as a member of the Pioneers' starting rotation in 2014, posting a 3.21 ERA and gathering 56 strikeouts in 61.2 innings. Following the 2014 season, James committed to transferring to Lynn University, a Division II school in Boca Raton, Florida.

== Career ==
=== Houston Astros ===
==== Minor leagues ====
The Houston Astros selected James in the 34th round of the 2014 Major League Baseball draft, with the 1,006th overall pick. James made his professional debut in 2014 with the rookie–level Greeneville Astros and spent the whole season there, going 1–3 with a 2.72 ERA in 39 2/3 innings pitched. In 2015, he pitched with the Single–A Quad Cities River Bandits where he was 7–4 with a 2.63 ERA in 24 games (18 starts). In 2016 he was promoted to the High–A Lancaster JetHawks where he posted a 9–5 record and a 4.81 ERA in 23 games (19 starts), and in 2017, he went 4–8 with a 4.38 ERA in 21 games, 11 which were starts, with the Double-A Corpus Christi Hooks.

After starting the 2018 season with Corpus Christi, James was promoted to the Triple–A Fresno Grizzlies during the season. With the two teams he was 6–4 with a 3.23 ERA, and 171 strikeouts in 114 1/3 innings (13.5 per 9 innings). James was named the Astros' Minor League Pitcher of the Year for 2018.

During the 2018 season, James saw a jump in his velocity, which he credited to a recent sleep apnea diagnosis. His roommate in rookie ball in 2014, Ryan Thompson, complained often about James' incessant snoring, saying, "He was like a chainsaw taking down a national forest." James consulted a sleep specialist in December 2016 and was diagnosed with sleep apnea.

After he began using a CPAP machine, James said he felt "just a little bit more refreshed in the morning, a little bit more refreshed about the day, and slowly I started feeling a little bit better every day." This translated into a gradual increase in his fastball velocity, growing from 94 to 95 miles per hour to 100 miles per hour.

==== Major leagues ====
James was promoted to the major leagues for the first time on September 1, 2018, becoming the lowest drafted pitcher in Houston Astros history to make a start for the team. In 2018 with the Astros, he was 2–0 with a 2.35 ERA, in six games (three starts) in which he pitched 23 innings and struck out 29 batters. (11.3 strikeouts per 9 innings). James was on the American League Division Series roster but did not see any playing time against the Cleveland Indians. In the 2018 American League Championship Series, James pitched 4 1/3 innings, giving up 6 hits and 4 runs and striking out 7.

In game 4 of the 2018 ALCS, James recorded his highest velocity fastball, clocking in at 102.4 miles per hour and striking out Rafael Devers.

In 2019 with the Astros, he transitioned from the starting rotation to the bullpen. On July 15, James served in an opener role, pitching a 1-2-3 first inning and recording one strikeout. On September 3, 2019, he recorded his first career save against the Milwaukee Brewers. He ended the 2019 season 5–1 with a 4.70 ERA in 49 games in which he pitched 61 1/3 innings and struck out 100 batters (14.7 per 9 innings). James was also a part of the ALDS, ALCS, and World Series rosters and is formally credited with the win in game 3 of the World Series, making him one of only 10 pitchers in Astros history to record a World Series win as of November 2022.

During spring training in 2020, James was part of a battle for the fifth spot in the starting rotation, a role he eventually won. After arriving to the pre-season camp late due to the birth of his daughter, James made two starts at the beginning of the delayed 2020 season before transitioning back to the bullpen. On August 20, he left a game against the Colorado Rockies with left hip discomfort and was placed on the 10-day injured list on August 22. James was activated on September 9 and posted a 1.35 ERA and 0.90 WHIP over his 6 2/3 innings of work in the month of September. He was placed on the COVID-19 injured list due to health and safety protocols on September 25. On the year, he went 1–0 with a 7.27 ERA with 21 strikeouts in 17 1/3 innings (10.9 strikeouts per 9 innings), over 13 games. In his 4 innings of work in the 2020 postseason, he allowed 5 hits and 4 runs. Notably, James gave up a game-tying home run to Ji-man Choi in Game 5 of the 2020 American League Championship Series.

On October 24, 2020, it was announced that James had undergone surgery to repair a labral tear in his left hip and would be out for 6–8 months. In a spring training broadcast in March 2022, it would be revealed that James had also received a PRP injection in his right elbow at this time. Originally set to return between late May and early June, he was retroactively placed on the 60-day injured list on May 26, 2021, as he continued to recover from the surgery. After completing rehab assignments with the Fayetteville Woodpeckers and Sugar Land Skeeters in the month of July, James was activated off the injured list on August 1 and optioned to Triple-A Sugar Land. In his 20 2/3 innings in the minors in 2021, he allowed 7 earned runs and struck out 28. James was recalled on August 31 and was optioned back to Triple-A on September 5. He was optioned and recalled two more times in the month of September. James had a 5.40 ERA in his 5 major league innings in 2021. In his final appearance of the year for Sugar Land on October 3, he gave up 3 runs and left the game with an injury after hitting a 20 pitch limit.

James avoided arbitration with the Astros on March 22, 2022, agreeing to a $800,000 contract for the season. On March 30, James was optioned to Triple-A Sugar Land, now called the Space Cowboys, after two major league spring training appearances. On April 10, he closed out the team's first win since rebranding, simultaneously picking up his first save of the year. On June 15, James left a Sugar Land game with an injury and was placed on the 7-day injured list with a right lat strain on June 21 before being placed on the 60-day injured list on the June 23. He began a rehab assignment with the Fayetteville Woodpeckers on August 25, striking out the side in one inning of work. After making 7 rehab appearances (2 in Fayetteville and 5 in Sugar Land), James left the September 13 Sugar Land game with an apparent injury, indicated by a dropoff in his fastball velocity. On October 1, it was announced that James had undergone surgery on his right flexor tendon.

On November 18, 2022, the Astros non-tendered James, making him a free agent.

=== St. Louis Cardinals ===
On January 26, 2024, James signed a minor league contract with the St. Louis Cardinals. In 9 appearances for the Triple–A Memphis Redbirds, he struggled to a 19.96 ERA with 5 strikeouts across 7 2/3 innings of work. On May 13, James was released by the Cardinals organization.

=== Long Island Ducks ===
On May 21, 2024, James signed with the Long Island Ducks of the Atlantic League of Professional Baseball. In 23 games for Long Island, he struggled to an 8.10 ERA with 28 strikeouts across 20 innings of work. James was released by the Ducks on August 4.

=== Staten Island FerryHawks ===
On August 6, 2024, James signed with the Staten Island FerryHawks of the Atlantic League of Professional Baseball. In 17 games for Staten Island, he recorded a 3.78 ERA with 29 strikeouts and 1 save across 16 2/3 innings of relief. James became a free agent following the season.

== Personal life ==
James has many tattoos, including a partial sleeve on his left arm. The bible verse Psalms 119:105 is tattooed on his right forearm. The verse reads, "Thy Word Is a Lamp Unto My Feet and Light Unto My Path." Several other tattoos honor his roots in Puerto Rico and the U.S. Virgin Islands, and the date of his Major League debut (9.1.18) is inked on his right tricep. James is a devoted Miami Heat fan and has a tattoo of the team's logo. James also has a bicep tattoo of the Florida Marlins logo, though he has stated that he was a fan of the New York Yankees growing up, citing Derek Jeter and Alex Rodriguez as his favorite players.

In the offseason, James resides in Southwest Florida with his wife, Gabrielle (née Lopez), and their children. James and Lopez began dating in November 2013 while both were enrolled at Western Oklahoma State College and playing on the baseball and softball teams respectively. They eventually married in January 2022 in Beaver Creek, Colorado. The couple has four children, Noah (born November 2018), Sophia (born July 2020), and fraternal twins Avery and Jace (born October 2022). In November 2022, the family announced that Jace had died at 23 days old.
