= 2017 Houston Astros season =

56th season in Major League Baseball for the Houston Astros

2017 Houston Astros
- World Series champions American League champions American League West champions
- League: American League
- Division: West
- Ballpark: Minute Maid Park
- City: Houston, Texas
- Record: 101–61 (.623)
- Divisional place: 1st
- Owners: Jim Crane
- General managers: Jeff Luhnow
- Managers: A. J. Hinch
- Television: Root Sports Southwest (April–July); AT&T SportsNet Southwest (July–October) (Todd Kalas, Geoff Blum)
- Radio: Sportstalk 790 (Robert Ford, Steve Sparks, Geoff Blum); KLAT (Spanish) (Francisco Romero, Alex Treviño)
- Stats: ESPN.com; Baseball Reference

The 2017 Houston Astros season was the 56th season for the Major League Baseball (MLB) franchise located in Houston, Texas, their 53rd as the Astros, fifth in both the American League (AL) and AL West division, and 18th at Minute Maid Park. They entered the season as having posted an 84–78 record, in third place and 11 games behind the division-champion Texas Rangers.

Dallas Keuchel made his third consecutive Opening Day start on April 3 for Houston, who hosted the Seattle Mariners and won, 3–0. On June 11, Nori Aoki recorded his 2,000th hit combined in MLB and Nippon Professional Baseball (NPB). The Astros' first-round draft pick in the amateur draft was pitcher J. B. Bukauskas; they also chose outfielders Jake Meyers and Chas McCormick in the 13th and 21st rounds, respectively.

The Astros sent six players to the 88th All-Star Game, including second baseman Jose Altuve, center fielder George Springer, shortstop Carlos Correa, and pitchers Keuchel, Lance McCullers Jr., and Chris Devenski. First baseman Jeff Bagwell, who had spent his entire 15-year major league career with Houston, became the second inductee into the Baseball Hall of Fame as an Astro.

Near the end of August, the Astros acquired pitcher Justin Verlander at the trade deadline, who won his first five starts. Meanwhile, as Hurricane Harvey impacted Greater Houston, the Astros relocated their August 29–31 series with the Rangers from Minute Maid Park to Tropicana Field in St. Petersburg, Florida. Following the storm, Astros personnel assisted with rebuilding and charitable efforts around Houston.

On September 17, the Astros clinched the AL West with a 7–1 victory over the Seattle, for their first AL West division title, eighth division title overall, and 11th postseason qualification. The Astros defeated the Boston Red Sox, 3–2, on September 29 to claim their 100th win of the season for their first 100-win season since 1998.

Following the regular season, the Astros met the Red Sox at home in the American League Division Series (ALDS), and defeated them in four games. Houston then advanced to the American League Championship Series (ALCS) and defeated the New York Yankees in seven games for their first AL pennant. After going 2–0 with a 0.56 earned run average (ERA) and 21 strikeouts, Verlander was named ALCS Most Valuable Player (MVP). The pennant was Houston's first since winning the National League (NL) pennant in 2005. The Astros' season culminated with the first World Series championship in franchise history, winning in seven games over the Los Angeles Dodgers. Springer, who tied a World Series record with five home runs, was named World Series MVP.

The 2017 Astros featured the highest-scoring offense in the major leagues (896 runs), the highest batting average (.282), on-base percentage (.346), and slugging percentage (.478). Altuve, the AL batting champion (.346) for the third time, was recognized with a number of both baseball and at-large athletics distinctions, including AL Most Valuable Player (AL MVP), Sports Illustrated Sportsperson of the Year, (Note: Co-winner with J. J. Watt of the NFL's Houston Texans.) Associated Press Male Athlete of the Year, and Hickok Belt annual prize.

Due to their record-setting numbers and individual accolades, this Astros batting lineup is often cited as one of the highest-performing in history.

The season was later marred by a sign stealing scandal that ultimately led to significant backlash from baseball fans, the loss of draft picks and a record setting fine from the MLB, and the dismissal of employees in the organization that were directly linked to the scandal.

== Offseason ==
=== Summary ===
The Astros concluded the 2016 season with an 84–78 (.519) record, in third place in the AL West division, and 11 games behind the division-champion Texas Rangers. In the Wild Card standings, Houston trailed the Baltimore Orioles and Toronto Blue Jays by five games, thus missing a playoff entrance. With an 86–76 (.531) regular-season record in 2015, Houston registered 84 or more victories over consecutive seasons for the first time since 2001 to 2005, when they were still members of the National League. The 2016 season was the final in which Houston would miss the playoffs until 2025.

Second baseman Jose Altuve extended his own club record by leading the American League in hits (216) for a third successive campaign, also his second time leading the Major Leagues (2014).

=== Transactions ===
==== November 2016 ====
November 3, 2016	Claimed OF Nori Aoki off waivers from Seattle.
November 4, 2016	Traded RHP Pat Neshek to Philadelphia for a player to be named or cash. Exercised the 2017 option on C Evan Gattis.
November 6, 2016	Selected the contract of LHP Reymin Guduan from Fresno (PCL).
November 15, 2016	Named Alex Cora bench coach.
November 16, 2016	Agreed to terms with RHP Charlie Morton on a two-year contract.
November 17, 2016	Traded RHP Albert Abreu and RHP Jorge Guzman to New York for C Brian McCann.
November 19, 2016	Announced Buies Creek (Carolina) will serve as a temporary Class A-Advanced affiliate through the 2018 season.
November 23, 2016	Agreed to terms with OF Josh Reddick on a four-year contract.

==== December ====
December 5, 2016	Agreed to terms with Carlos Beltrán on a one-year contract.
December 6, 2016	Claimed LHP Ashur Tolliver off waivers from the L.A. Angels.
December 9, 2016	Agreed to terms with LHP Cionel Perez on a minor league contract.
December 13, 2016	Signed a 30-year lease agreement with Fayetteville, N.C. to relocate their Class A Advanced affiliate to Fayetteville beginning with the 2019 season.

==== January 2017 ====
January 9, 2017	Agreed to terms with C Luis Barajas on a minor league contract.
January 10, 2017	Named Darryl Robinson hitting coach, Aaron DelGiudice development coach and Lee Meyer trainer of Fresno (PCL); Omar Lopez manager, Chris Holt pitching coach, Troy Snitker hitting coach, Mickey Storey development coach, John Gregorich trainer and Mark Spadavecchia strength coach of Buies Creek (Carolina), Russ Steinhorn manager, Drew French pitching coach, Ben Rosenthal hitting coach, Jason Bell development coach, Elliot Diehl trainer and Hazael Wessin strength coach of Quad Cities (MWL); Morgan Ensberg manager, Bill Murphy pitching coach, Jeremy Barnes hitting coach and Daniel Cerquera trainer of Tri-City (NY-P); Erick Abreu pitching coach and Jacob Behara strength coach of Greeneville
January 14, 2017	Agreed to terms with LHP Dallas Keuchel and OFs Jake Marisnick and George Springer on one-year contracts and with INF Reid Brignac, C Juan Centeno and LHP C.J. Riefenhauser on minor league contracts.
January 19, 2017	Agreed to terms with RHP Mike Fiers on a one-year contract.

==== February ====
February 2, 2017	Agreed to terms with RHP Dayan Diaz on a minor league contract.
February 7, 2017	Agreed to terms with RHP Will Harris on a two-year contract.
February 17, 2017	Agreed to terms with INF Marwin Gonzalez on a one-year contract.

==== March ====
March 14, 2017	Reassigned RHPs Edison Frias, Cy Sneed and Aaron West, LHP Brian Holmes and C Garrett Stubbs to their minor league camp.
March 16, 2017	Reassigned OF Andrew Aplin, RHP Brady Rodgers and LHPs Reymin Guduan and Ashur Tolliver to minor league camp.
March 16, 2017	Optioned OF Andrew Aplin, RHP Brady Rodgers and LHPs Reymin Guduan and Ashur Tolliver to Fresno (PCL).
March 18, 2017	Reassigned OF Ramon Laureano and RHP Francis Martes to their minor league camp.
March 22, 2017	Assigned C Max Stassi outright to Fresno (PCL). Optioned INF/OF Tony Kemp, OF Teoscar Hernandez, 3B Colin Moran and 1B A.J. Reed and Tyler White to Fresno. Reassigned C Tyler Heineman and 1B Jonathan Singleton to minor league camp.
March 25, 2017	Reassigned OF Alejandro Garcia, RHP Jordan Jankowski, OF Jon Kemmer and RHP Tyson Perez to their minor league camp. Granted LHP C.J. Riefenhauser his unconditional release.
March 29, 2017	Optioned OF Preston Tucker to minor league camp.

==== April ====
April 1, 2017	Optioned RHP James Hoyt to Fresno (PCL).

=== World Baseball Classic ===
Astros selected to represent their respective home countries in the World Baseball Classic (WBC)—held from March 6 to 22, 2017—included:

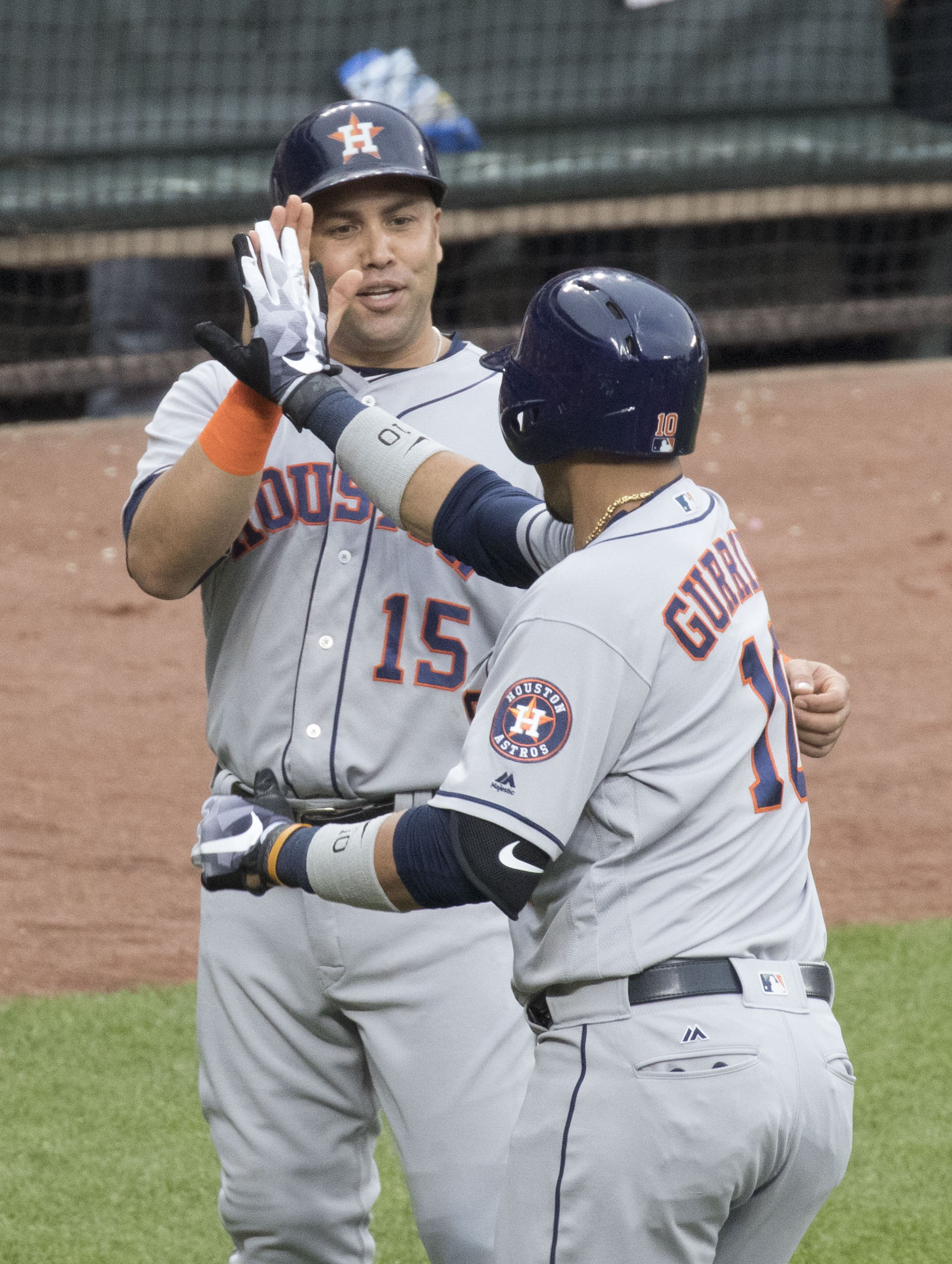
Carlos Beltrán (15) and Yuli Gurriel.

Houston Astros in the 2017 WBC
Player	Position	National team	Stats
Kevin Chapman	Pitcher	Canada	
Dayan Díaz	Pitcher	Colombia	
Nori Aoki	Center fielder	Japan (bronze)	
Carlos Beltrán (Note: Selected to All-WBC Team)	Designated hitter	Puerto Rico (silver)	
Carlos Correa	Third baseman	Puerto Rico (silver)	
Luke Gregerson	Pitcher	United States (gold)	
Alex Bregman	Third baseman	United States (gold)	
Jose Altuve	Second baseman	Venezuela	
Omar López	Coach	Venezuela	

Puerto Rican teammates Carlos Beltrán and Carlos Correa each led Puerto Rico to a tournament-high seven wins while garnering selection to the All-WBC Team. Correa batted .333 / .500 on-base percentage (OBP) / .750 slugging percentage (SLG) / 1.250 on-base plus slugging (OPS), three home runs, nine runs batted in (RBI), 10 base on balls (BB), and four strikeouts. Correa tied with Wladimir Balentien (Netherlands) for runs scored in the WBC with 10, while finishing second to Balentien in home runs and RBI. Beltrán hit .435 (10-for-23).

In the semifinal round held at Dodger Stadium, Puerto Rico defeated the Netherlands, 4 to 3, started by Correa's home run in the first inning. In the bottom of the eleventh inning, Correa scored the game-winning run on a sacrifice fly hit by Eddie Rosario.

== Regular season ==
=== Summary ===
==== April ====
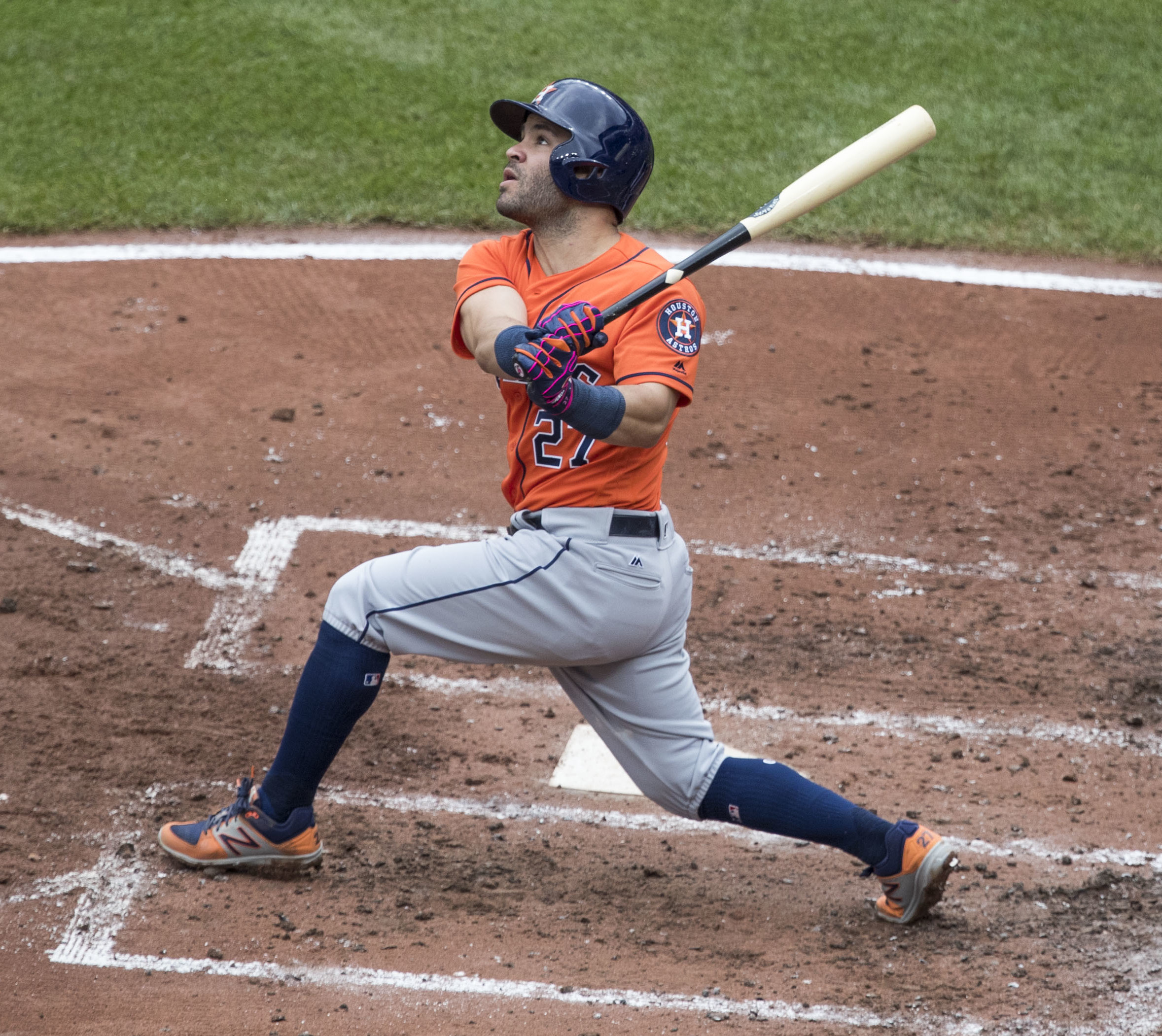
AL MVP Jose Altuve (left) and Opening Day starting pitcher Dallas Keuchel (right).

Opening Day starting lineup
Uniform	Player	Position
4	George Springer	Center fielder
2	Alex Bregman	Third baseman
27	Jose Altuve	Second baseman
1	Carlos Correa	Shortstop
15	Carlos Beltrán	Designated hitter
22	Josh Reddick	Right fielder
10	Yuli Gurriel	First baseman
16	Brian McCann	Catcher
3	Nori Aoki	Left fielder
60	Dallas Keuchel	Pitcher
Venue: Minute Maid Park • Final: Houston 3, Seattle 0 Sources:

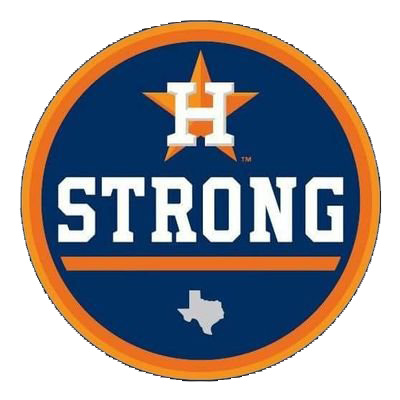
The Astros wore a patch during the 2017 season in support of Hurricane Harvey victims in Houston

The Astros commenced the 2017 regular season on April 3 on Opening Day, at home hosting the Seattle Mariners. Dallas Keuchel made his third consecutive Opening Day start for the Astros, with Félix Hernández as his counterpart. George Springer led off the Astros' offensive season with a home run. During the fourth inning, Carlos Correa homered. In the bottom of the sixth, Alex Bregman drew a leadoff base on balls, advanced to third on Jose Altuve's line drive single, and scored on Correa's sacrifice fly. Bregman also had a stolen base. Meanwhile, Keuchel remained in complete control, tossing seven two-hit shutout frames, two walks, and earned a game score of 75. Keuchel also earned the win while leading the Astros to a 3–0 decision. Luke Gregerson pitched the eighth inning to receive credit for the hold, and Ken Giles closed out the ninth to convert the save. Correa's home run on Opening Day was his second consecutive,. while Springer's home run was the first of his career on Opening Day, and tenth leadoff. The triumph was the fifth in succession on Opening Day for Houston, tying the club record set in 1977, and continuing into a winning streak of ten through 2022.

One of the most memorable and debated manifestations to hallmark the 2017 season was Jose Altuve's height and style of play contrasts with that of New York Yankees right fielder Aaron Judge. At 6 feet 7 inches (2.01 m) and 280 pounds (130 kg), Judge was a rookie who emerged as his chief rival in the 2017 American League (AL) Most Valuable Player (MVP) race, eventually breaking the record for both home runs hit (52) and walks drawn (127) by a rookie while leading the AL. In July, a photo emerged of the pair standing side by side in game versus the Yankees that displayed their drastic size difference and became a viral phenomenon.

Two Astros pitchers were awarded the AL Pitcher of the Month Award in the first two months of the season. In April, left-handed starting pitcher Dallas Keuchel posted a 5–0 win–loss record (W–L), allowing six runs in six games started and 1.21 earned run average (ERA) over 44 2/3 innings pitched (IP). It was his fourth career monthly award, making him the first Astros pitcher to win four; J. R. Richard was the other Astros pitcher who had won three. Keuchel joined Bartolo Colón, Félix Hernández, Justin Verlander as active pitchers who had won at least four.

==== May ====
During a two week span commencing May 2, Marwin González became the first of three Astros to hit his first career grand slam. His grand slam was also part of his second switch-hit, multi-home run game, and first since July 26, 2016. Moreover, González became the second Astro to home from both sides of plate in which one was a grand slam, succeeding Kevin Bass on August 20, 1989. González' first homer was leading off the fifth inning, batting right-handed versus Texas Rangers' starter Alex Claudio. Batting left-handed during the bottom of the eighth inning verssus Keone Kela, he connected for the grand slam to cap a rally that flipped a 3–5 deficit into a 7–5 lead. The Astros held on for an 8–7 triumph.

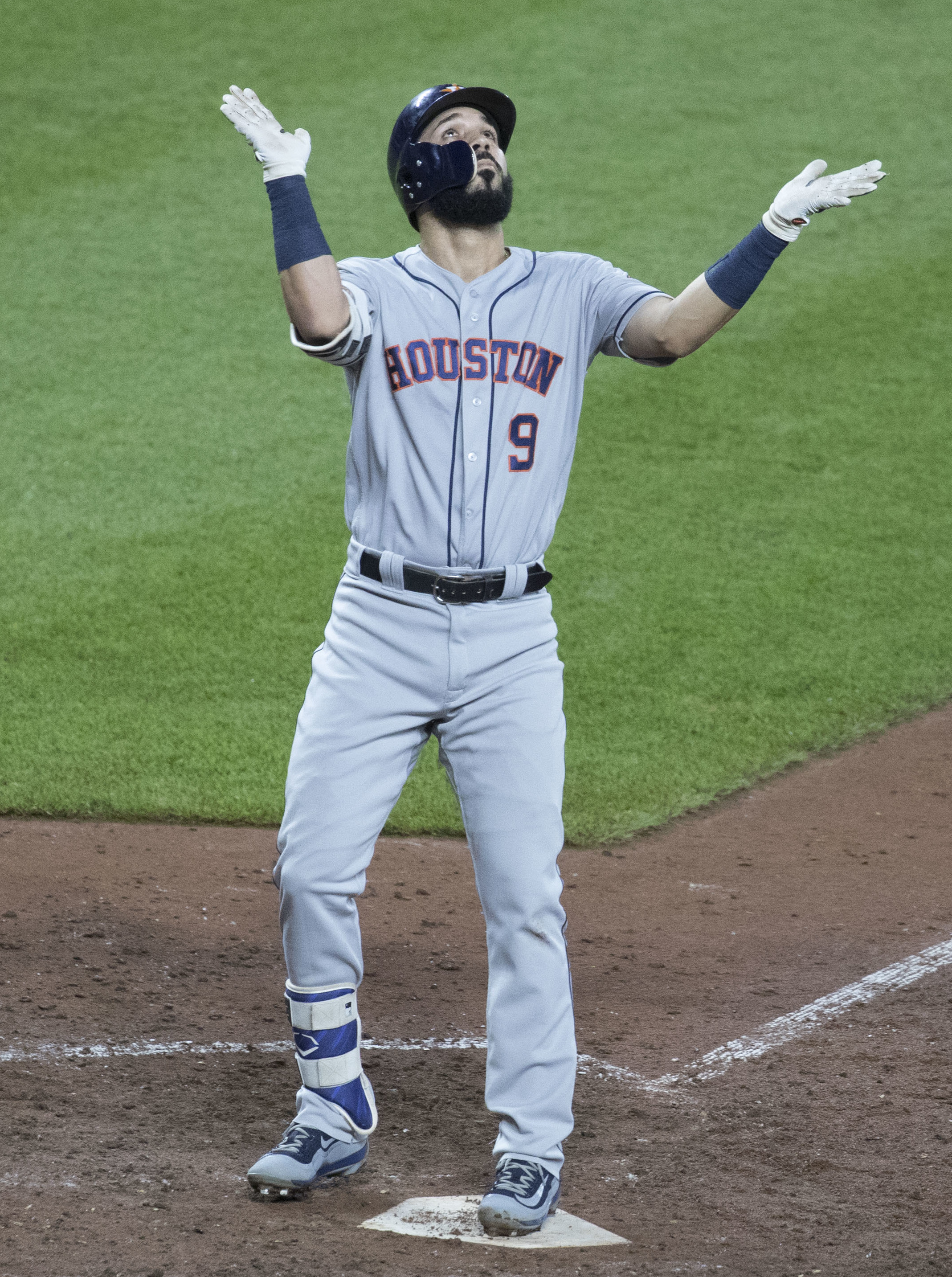
infielder Marwin González steps on home plate during a game in 2017.

On May 4, the Astros tied a then-club record for a nine-inning game with 16 runners left on base (LOB) during a 10–4 defeat to the versus Texas Rangers. (Note: Previously accomplished three times: on August 4, 1979 (game 1), August 7, 1987, and April 6, 2004. Remained the club record until April 4, 2026. Criteria: For single games, from 1962 to 2026, for HOU, in the regular season, sorted by descending runners left on base.) This was the 24th game in club history played in 9 innings or fewer in which the Astros collected at least 10 hits and 10 walks each, and just the third that ended in a loss. (Note: Most recent game of this type for the Astros (including wins and losses) occurred on August 20, 2016, and the next occurred on August 26, 2021. Criteria: For single games, from 1962 to 2026, only 9-inning games or shortened, for HOU, in the regular season, requiring bases on balls ≥ 10 and hits ≥ 10, sorted by ascending date.)

From May 6−23, starting pitcher Lance McCullers Jr. completed a scoreless innings streak of 22, which among Astros pitchers, was the longest scoreless inning streak since Roy Oswalt delivered 32 from August 27 through September 11, 2008. In that same span, McCullers also became the first Astros pitcher since Nolan Ryan in May 1984 to allow no earned runs over at least five innings pitched in each of four consecutive appearances.

During the May 14 game versus New York at Yankee Stadium, third baseman Alex Bregman hit his first major league grand slam off Masahiro Tanaka in a 10–7 Astros win. On May 20, Keuchel was placed on the 10-day disabled list due to a pinched nerve in his neck.

Facing an 8–2 deficit on May 29, the Astros engineered an epic comeback by exploding for 11 runs in the eighth and ninth innings to outlast the Minnesota Twins, 16 to 8. Carlos Beltrán led the way, slugging a home run, and collecting four of Houston's 18 hits. Jose Altuve, Carlos Correa, and Marwin González each tallied three safeties. This was Beltrán's third four-hit bout as a member of the Astros, and first since October 11, 2004, during Game 5 of the National League Division Series (NLDS).

Shortstop Carlos Correa delivered a career-best five consecutive multiple-hit games from May 25−29, and totaled 14 such games on the month. In May, he was selected for his first AL Player of the Month Award, and McCullers his first AL Pitcher of the Month Award. In 26 games, Correa batted .386, eight doubles, seven home runs, 26 RBI and a 1.130 OPS. His batting average and RBI total led the AL, on-base percentage ranked third, hits and OPS fifth, and slugging tied for sixth.

McCullers was credited with a 4−0 record in six starts during the month of May. He permitted an AL-leading 0.99 earned run average (ERA), 21 hits, and a .164 batting average against (BAA) with 37 strikeouts. He also ranked second in wins, third in BAA, and tied for fifth in strikeouts.

==== June ====
With persistent neck problems, the Astros placed Dallas Keuchel back on the disabled list on June 8.

Nori Aoki makes a play in the outfield.

On June 11, Nori Aoki recorded three hits, the second of which denoted number 2,000 combined between MLB (716) and Nippon Professional Baseball (1,284 NPB). The milestone hit was a single in the sixth inning. The event signified automatic induction into the Meikyukai (Golden Players Club, one of Japanese baseball Halls of Fame and an equivalent to the Baseball Hall of Fame). Aoki joined Kazuo Matsui on August 15, 2009, as the second player to achieve 2,000 hits combined through both leagues.

On June 14, Derek Fisher homered and collected an RBI single for his first hits, both as part of an Astros' 9-run sixth inning to lead a defeat the Texas Rangers, 13–2. Fisher became the first major leaguer to get his first two hits in the same inning since Adam LaRoche did so on June 7, 2004, for the Atlanta Braves. Jake Marisnick also homered for the Astros, whose hitting gave Francis Martes (1–0) his first major league win, also making his first major league start.

==== July: Pre-All Star break ====
In the July 9 game versus the Toronto Blue Jays, the Astros won 19–1 as Correa homered twice, collected four hits, and drove in a career-best five runs. He reached the 20-home run mark and saw a 15-game hitting streak snapped the previous day. It was the Astros' 60th win of the season, making them the fifth team within the previous 40 years to reach that many wins before the All-Star break. The Astros entered the All-Star break with the best record in the AL, at 60–29, marking the best 89-game start in franchise history. Their 16 1/2-game lead in the AL West marked the largest divisional lead the club had ever attained all-time.

==== MLB All-Star Game ====
For the first time in franchise history, three Astros players were elected by fans as starters for the All-Star Game, held at Marlins Park in Miami. The starters were Altuve, Correa, and center fielder George Springer. As was former Astros manager Brad Mills' selection, Altuve, who typically hit third for the Astros, batted leadoff for the American League. Springer, the Astros leadoff hitter, batted cleanup. Two others Astros made the team, including Keuchel and McCullers.

==== July: Post-All Star break ====
On July 18, Correa sustained a torn ligament in the left thumb, and the Astros placed him on the DL.

Rookie third baseman Colin Moran sustained fractures of the facial bones during a game versus the Baltimore Orioles on July 22. The injury occurred as he fouled off a pitch, and the batted ball struck him directly in the face. He underwent surgery to repair the fractures on July 31.

George Springer was placed on the diabled list (DL) on July 28 due to left quadriceps discomfort.

On July 30, 2017, former Astros first baseman Jeff Bagwell was inducted into the Baseball Hall of Fame in Cooperstown, New York.

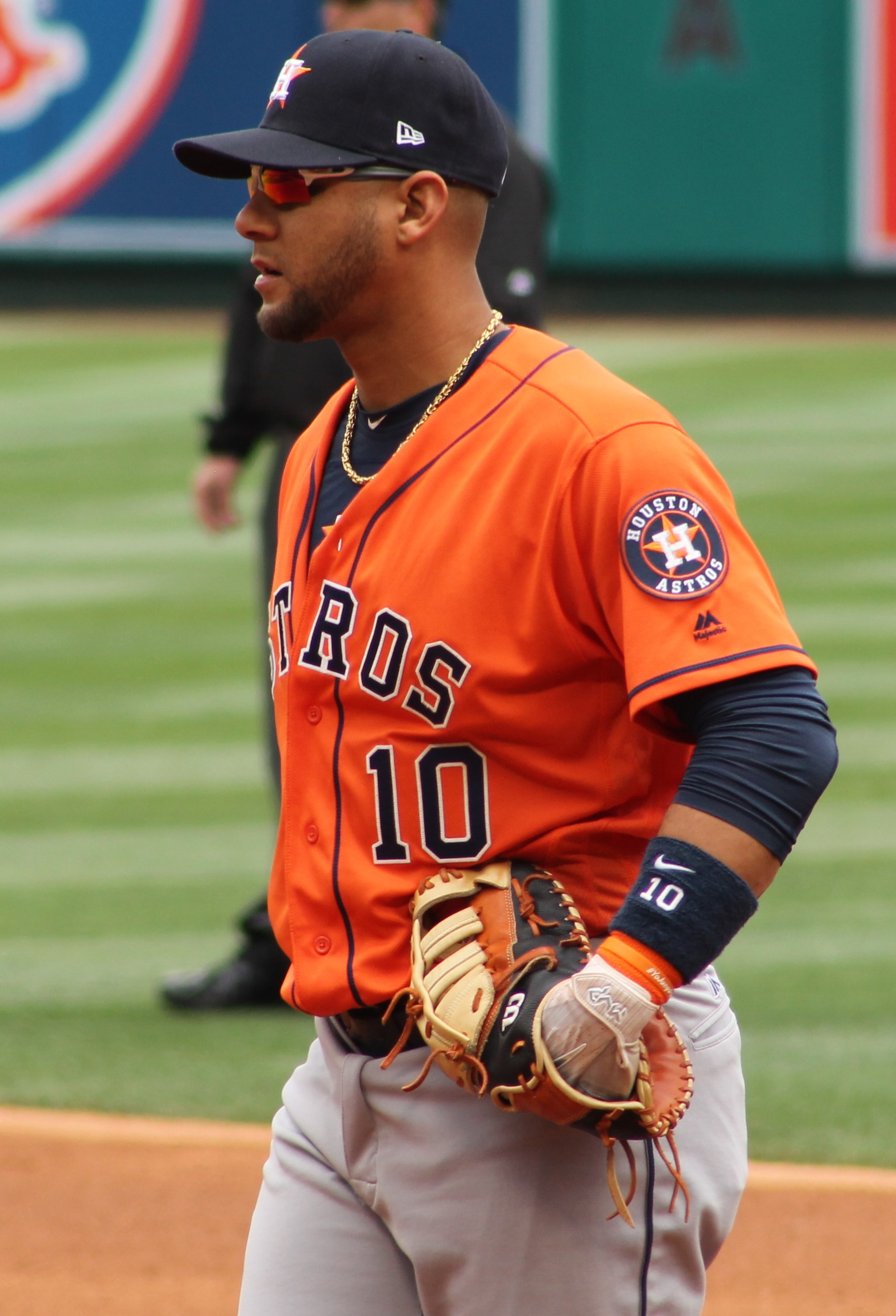
Yuli Gurriel was AL Rookie of the Month in July.

In July, Jose Altuve batted .485 for the fifth-highest average in one month since 1961. Over 23 games, he accumulated 48 hits, 10 doubles, one triple, four home runs, 21 RBI and 1.251 OPS. He carried a 19-game hitting streak from July 2–23. He also recorded five consecutive multi-hit games during the week of July 3–9, becoming the ninth player in MLB history to do so. His average set the Astros record for one calendar month—surpassing Richard Hidalgo's .476 average in September of 2000—and he won his second AL Player of the Month Award. Yuli Gurriel won the AL Rookie of the Month Award in July, and he led all AL rookies with .565 slugging percentage, .899 OPS, 28 hits, nine doubles, and 20 RBI. The nine doubles tied Lance Berkman's club record for rookies in a single month. Additionally, Altuve received the monthly Hickok Belt prize for July, succeeding Kevin Durant of the NBA's Golden State Warriors, the winner for June. It was the first of the two monthly iterations Altuve would receive in 2017.

==== August ====
Carlos Beltrán, who served primarily as the designated hitter for Houston this season, made his final career appearance on defense on August 5. He played left field for the first nine innings of 10-inning loss to the Toronto Blue Jays.

On August 10, Bregman tied the Astros' record for extra-base hits in consecutive games at 10 games, first accomplished by Hidalgo. In a 27-game stretch following the All-Star break, the Astros slumped, going 11–16 (.407).

On August 13, 2017, the Chicago White Sox traded reliever Tyler Clippard to the Astros for a player to be named later or cash considerations.

On August 19, Gurriel tied an American League record for first basemen, becoming the seventh to participate in six double plays. (Note: Though Gurriel tied the AL record, this is not the club record. Due to Houston formerly being situated in the National League (NL), Astros players hold this record in two leagues. Curt Blefary, who lassoed seven double plays on May 4, 1969, established each of the Major League, NL, and club records.)

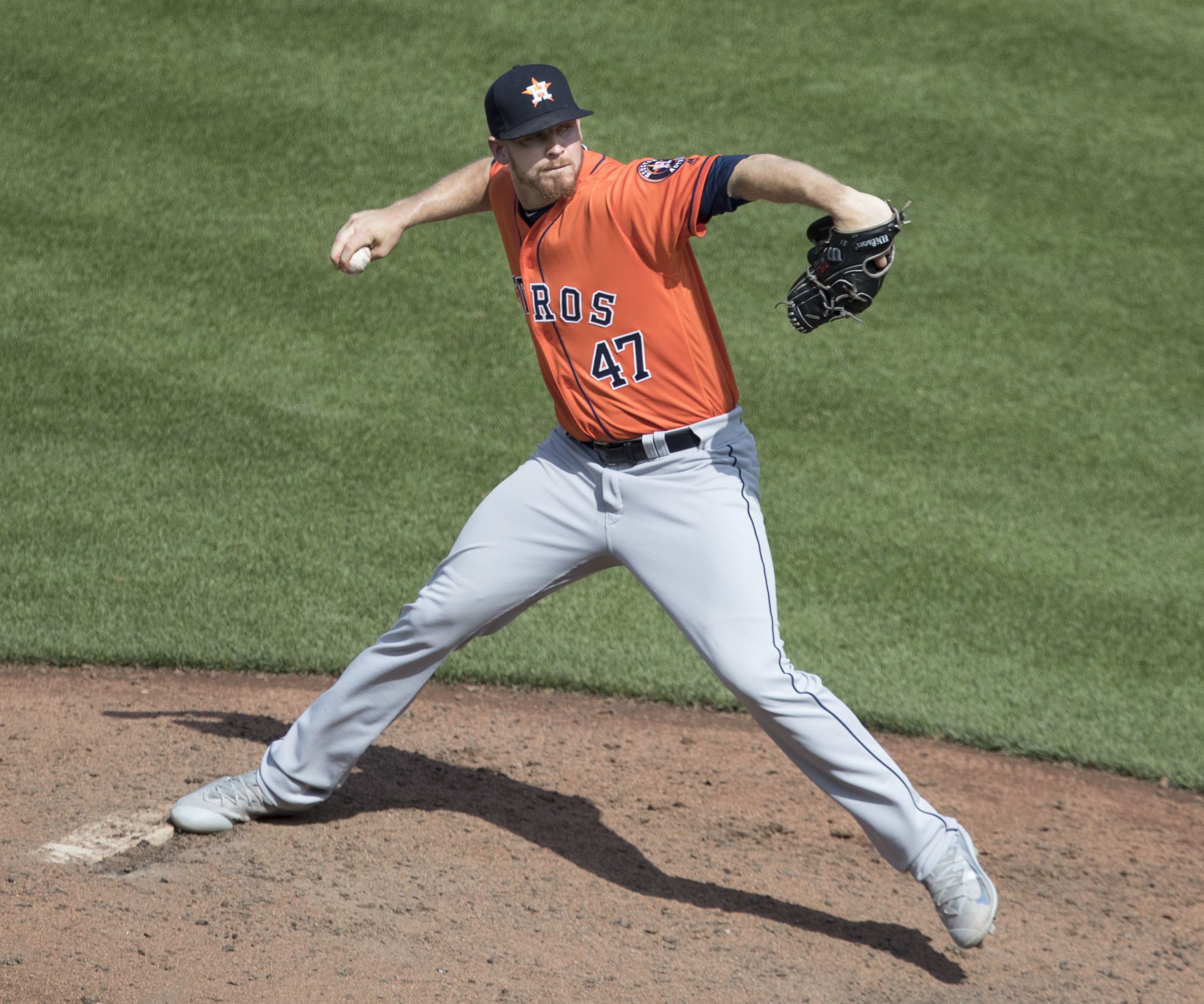
All-Star reliever Chris Devenski delivers the pitch.

On Saturday, August 26, Hurricane Harvey reached Houston. The Astros were playing a series on the read versus the Los Angeles Angels at the time, and were scheduled to return home to host the Texas Rangers. The games versus the Rangers were relocated to Tropicana Field in St. Petersburg, Florida, as more than 50 inches of rain inundated parts of Greater Houston and flooded more than one-third. Team officials planned for the next series versus the New York Mets also to be played at Tropicana Field, but mayor Sylvester Turner encouraged Astros president Reid Ryan to return the team to Houston to play the Mets. "You guys come home and play baseball," said Turner to Ryan. "This will be the beginning of our rebuild."

Having lost 17 of 27 games as of August 31 (.370 winning percentage), the Astros acquired right-handed ace and former Cy Young Award winner Justin Verlander from the Detroit Tigers just moments before the trade deadline. Detroit received prospects Franklin Pérez, Jake Rogers, and Daz Cameron. The Astros also claimed outfielder Cameron Maybin off waivers from the Angels on August 31. Correa and McCullers returned from the disabled list at that time. Verlander won all five regular season starts in an Astros uniform to help lead them to a 22–8 record over their final month and an overall registry of 101–61, clinching the AL West division title.

==== September—October ====
After the Astros returned to Houston and the New York Mets and MLB agreed to do a Saturday day–night doubleheader, the Astros spent the first Friday of the month surveying the aftermath and visiting with hurricane evacuees. This portended an emotional return to Minute Maid Park, with many evacuees in attendance for the doubleheader. Manager A. J. Hinch addressed the crowd, "Hello, Houston. It's good to be home," adding that it was "a very special day for us to start the rebuild process of our great city." The Mets starter, coincidentally named Matt Harvey, surrendered seven runs in two innings in the first game as the Astros swept the doubleheader, 12–8, and 4–1. Springer also hit a two run home run in the second inning of Game 1. Between games, the Astros and fans received a preview of Verlander's pitching while he tossed a bullpen session.

In the aftermath of Hurricane Harvey, the Astros continue to assist in the rebuild of various parts of the city during their off-time. One establishment included the Houston chapter of the Boys & Girls Clubs of America. Individual members of the team delivered meals, cleaned up damaged homes, and rescued pets. They visited the George R. Brown Convention Center, which housed more than 7,000 people displaced from their homes.

Verlander's debut as an Astro occurred on September 5 in a 3–1 victory versus the Mariners. The only run he allowed was a home run to Kyle Seager and he struck out seven over six innings. Maybin homered in the seventh inning to break a 1–1 tie, giving the Astros their sixth consecutive win.

Moran returned to the Astros on September 19, having completed a rehabilitation assignment at Class-A Quad Cities River Bandits. He had sustained a fracture below the left eye in a game on July 22.

On September 19, Altuve was announced as the recipient of MLB's Lou Gehrig Memorial Award for 2017, as the player "who best exemplifies the giving character" of Gehrig.

In the last series of the regular season, the Astros defeated the Red Sox 3–2 on September 29 for their 100th win of the season. Charlie Morton (14–7) pitched six innings to earn the win and Bregman hit a tie-breaking home run. The Astros joined the Los Angeles Dodgers and Cleveland Indians as 100-game winners in 2017, marking the first time since 2003 that three or more teams reached the milestone, and the sixth time overall in major league history. It was Houston's first 100-win season since 1998, when they won a club-record 102 games. The Astros defeated the Boston Red Sox on the final day of the regular season, Sunday, Oct. 1, 2017, to finish the season with a record of 101–61.

==== Performance overview ====
Overall, Houston finished the 2017 regular season with a 101–61 record, at the time the second-highest win total in franchise history, for a .623 winning percentage, trailing the 1998 team by one win. The 1998 and 2017 campaigns represented the first two having attained 100 victories for the Astros.

Having achieved 200 hits on the season, Jose Altuve became just the fifth hitter since integration in 1947 to record four straight 200-hit seasons, following Wade Boggs (1983−89), Kirby Puckett (1986−89), Ichiro Suzuki (2001−2010), and Michael Young (2003−07). He also became the first hitter in Major League history to solely lead his respective league in hits for four years in a row while also collecting his third career batting title. Suzuki technically led the AL in hits from 2006 to 2010, but tied with Dustin Pedroia in 2008.

Jose Altuve signs autographs in Baltimore.

Altuve won a number of season- and year-ending baseball and multi-sport athletics accolades. He was named AL American League Most Valuable Player (MVP), becoming the second winner in club history, following Jeff Bagwell in 1994. He was AP Athlete of the Year. Altuve, along with the NFL's J. J. Watt of the Houston Texans, were recognized as Sports Illustrated Sportsperson of the Year, following Watt's fundraiser imitated that received more than $37 million in donations in the aftermath of Hurricane Harvey, while Altuve and other Astros personnel directly assisted with relief efforts throughout Houston between games. Altuve also received the annual Hickok Belt prize, succeeding Olympic swimmer Michael Phelps. Altuve became the Astros' first winner of the Hank Aaron Award, and received Major League Player of the Year honors from Baseball America,' Baseball Digest,

Manager A. J. Hinch, who succeed Larry Dierker in 1998 as managers to have guided the club to 100 or more wins, was likewise recognized as Major League Manager of the Year by Baseball America. (Note: Recognizes one manager in the major leagues.)

Following his effort which helped raise more than $4 million in relief of Hurricane Maria which devastated his native Puerto Rico, Carlos Beltrán received Sports Illustrated's Hope Award. |-

=== League standings ===
==== American League West ====
AL West
Team	W	L	Pct.	GB	Home	Road
Houston Astros	101	61	.623	—	48‍–‍33	53‍–‍28
Los Angeles Angels	80	82	.494	21	43‍–‍38	37‍–‍44
Seattle Mariners	78	84	.481	23	40‍–‍41	38‍–‍43
Texas Rangers	78	84	.481	23	41‍–‍40	37‍–‍44
Oakland Athletics	75	87	.463	26	46‍–‍35	29‍–‍52

==== American League division leaders ====
AL Wild Card standings

Division leaders
Team	W	L	Pct.
Cleveland Indians	102	60	.630
Houston Astros	101	61	.623
Boston Red Sox	93	69	.574

Wild Card teams (Top 2 teams qualify for postseason)
Team	W	L	Pct.	GB
New York Yankees	91	71	.562	+6
Minnesota Twins	85	77	.525	—
Kansas City Royals	80	82	.494	5
Los Angeles Angels	80	82	.494	5
Tampa Bay Rays	80	82	.494	5
Seattle Mariners	78	84	.481	7
Texas Rangers	78	84	.481	7
Toronto Blue Jays	76	86	.469	9
Baltimore Orioles	75	87	.463	10
Oakland Athletics	75	87	.463	10
Chicago White Sox	67	95	.414	18
Detroit Tigers	64	98	.395	21

==== Record against opponents ====
American League

2017 American League record Source: MLB Standings Grid – 2017
Team	BAL	BOS	CWS	CLE	DET	HOU	KC	LAA	MIN	NYY	OAK	SEA	TB	TEX	TOR	NL
Baltimore	—	10–9	4–3	1–6	3–4	1–5	3–3	2–4	2–5	7–12	4–3	4–2	8–11	6–1	12–7	8–12
Boston	9–10	—	6–1	4–3	3–4	3–4	2–4	2–4	5–2	8–11	3–4	3–3	11–8	5–1	13–6	16–4
Chicago	3–4	1–6	—	6–13	10–9	4–2	10–9	3–4	7–12	3–4	1–5	3–4	3–3	4–3	3–3	6–14
Cleveland	6–1	3–4	13–6	—	13–6	5–1	12–7	6–0	12–7	5–2	3–4	4–2	4–3	6–1	4–2	6–14
Detroit	4–3	4–3	9–10	6–13	—	3–4	8–11	3–4	8–11	3–3	1–5	1–6	2–5	1–5	3–3	8–12
Houston	5–1	4–3	2–4	1–5	4–3	—	3–4	12–7	5–1	5–2	12–7	14–5	3–4	12–7	4–3	15–5
Kansas City	3–3	4–2	9–10	7–12	11–8	4–3	—	6–1	8–11	2–5	3–3	5–2	4–3	1–6	3–3	9–11
Los Angeles	4–2	4–2	4–3	0–6	4–3	7–12	1–6	—	2–5	4–2	12–7	12–7	3–4	8–11	4–3	11–9
Minnesota	5–2	2–5	12–7	7–12	11–8	1–5	11–8	5–2	—	2–4	3–3	3–4	2–4	4–3	4–3	13–7
New York	12–7	11–8	4–3	2–5	3–3	2–5	5–2	2–4	4–2	—	2–5	5–2	12–7	3–3	9–10	15–5
Oakland	3–4	4–3	5–1	4–3	5–1	7–12	3–3	7–12	3–3	5–2	—	7–12	2–5	10–9	2–5	7–13
Seattle	2–4	3–3	4–3	2–4	6–1	5–14	2–5	7–12	4–3	2–5	12–7	—	5–1	11–8	1–6	12–8
Tampa Bay	11–8	8–11	3–3	3–4	5–2	4–3	3–4	4–3	4–2	7–12	5–2	1–5	—	2–4	9–10	11–9
Texas	1–6	1–5	3–4	1–6	5–1	7–12	6–1	11–8	3–4	3–3	9–10	8–11	4–2	—	3–4	14–6
Toronto	7–12	6–13	3–3	2–4	3–3	3–4	3–3	3–4	3–4	10–9	5–2	6–1	10–9	4–3	—	9–11

=== Bating orders ===
No.	Most common (4×)	Most appearances
1	Springer	Springer (127)
2	Reddick	Reddick (60) • Altuve (42) • Bregman (42)
3	Altuve	Altuve (104)
4	Correa	Correa (84)
5	Beltrán	Beltrán (48) • González (42)
6	McCann	Gurriel (33) • Beltrán (31) • González (30)
7	Gurriel	Gurriel (35) • González (27)
8	Bregman	Bregman (48)
9	Aoki	Marisnick (57) • Aoki (42)

== Postseason ==
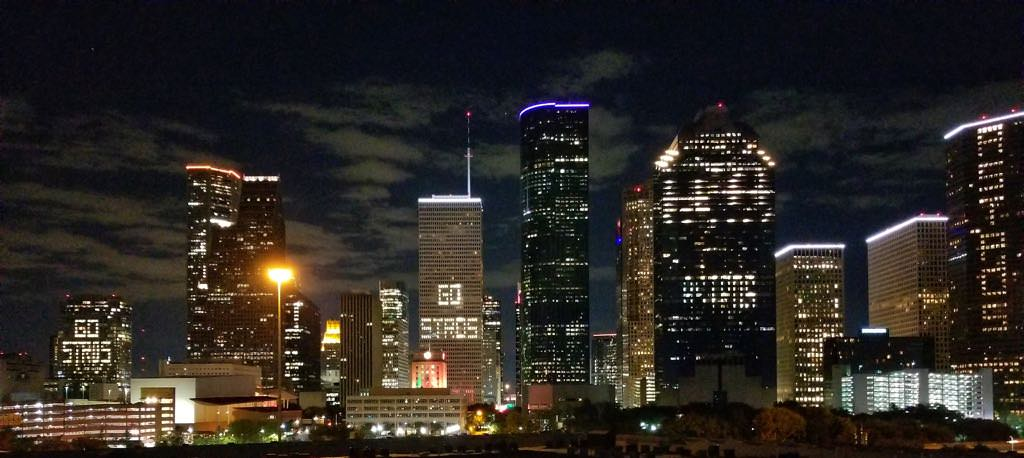
Many buildings in the skyline of Downtown Houston participated in cheering for the Astros during the 2017 World Series.

As winners of their respective division, the Astros received a bye during the procession of the AL Wild Card Game, played between the wild card winners, New York Yankees and Minnesota Twins. The Astros were seeded #2 in the AL, the result of attaining the second-most wins in the league. Their first playoff game of 2017 was in the American League Division Series, versus the Boston Red Sox. It was the first time the Astros had faced the Red Sox in the postseason.

=== American League Division Series (ALDS) ===
The Astros played American League East division champion Boston Red Sox in the ALDS. In Game 1, Altuve hit three home runs in a single game for the first time of his career while becoming the tenth player to hit three home runs in a single postseason game. Verlander won two games in the Astros' 3-games-to-1 triumph over the Red Sox. He started and won Game 1, and picked up the second win with 2 2/3 innings of relief in the clinching Game 4.

=== American League Championship Series (ALCS) ===
ALCS MVP Justin Verlander delivers the pitch.

The Astros faced the wild-card game winning Yankees in the ALCS. The Astros selected Keuchel to start Game 1 versus the Yankees' Masahiro Tanaka. In a pitcher's duel, Tanaka allowed no runs through the first three innings before the Astros scored in the bottom of the fourth. Altuve hit an infield single and stole second base before Carlos Correa drove him in with an RBI single. Yuli Gurriel drove in Correa to give the Astros a 2–0 lead. Keuchel recorded ten strikeouts, allowing four hits and no runs in seven innings. Tanaka pitched six innings with three strikeouts and allowed two earned runs. The Yankees scored their only run of the game in the ninth, when closer Ken Giles allowed a solo home run to Greg Bird before striking out Jacoby Ellsbury swinging to end the game. Giles struck out four of six batters faced for his first save of the ALCS and second of the postseason.

On October 14, Verlander started Game 2, throwing a 13-strikeout, 2–1 complete game victory. The Astros won the game on a ninth-inning walk-off double by Carlos Correa that drove home Altuve. Facing elimination in Game 6 of the ALCS, Verlander pitched seven shutout innings in a 7−1 victory over the Yankees.

The Astros also defeated the Yankees 4−0 in Game 7, on October 21, 2017, allowing them to advance to the World Series for the second time in franchise history, and first as a member of the American League. McCullers pitched four scoreless innings in relief to earn his first career save.

Verlander's totals in the ALCS included a 2−0 W−L, 0.56 ERA and 21 strikeouts in 16 innings pitched. As a result, he was named the ALCS Most Valuable Player (MVP).

=== World Series ===
In Game 2, Springer, Correa, Altuve—and two Dodgers players–Charlie Culberson and Yasiel Puig—all homered in extra innings as the Astros prevailed, 7−6. The five home runs accounted for the most hit in extra innings of any single game in major league history.

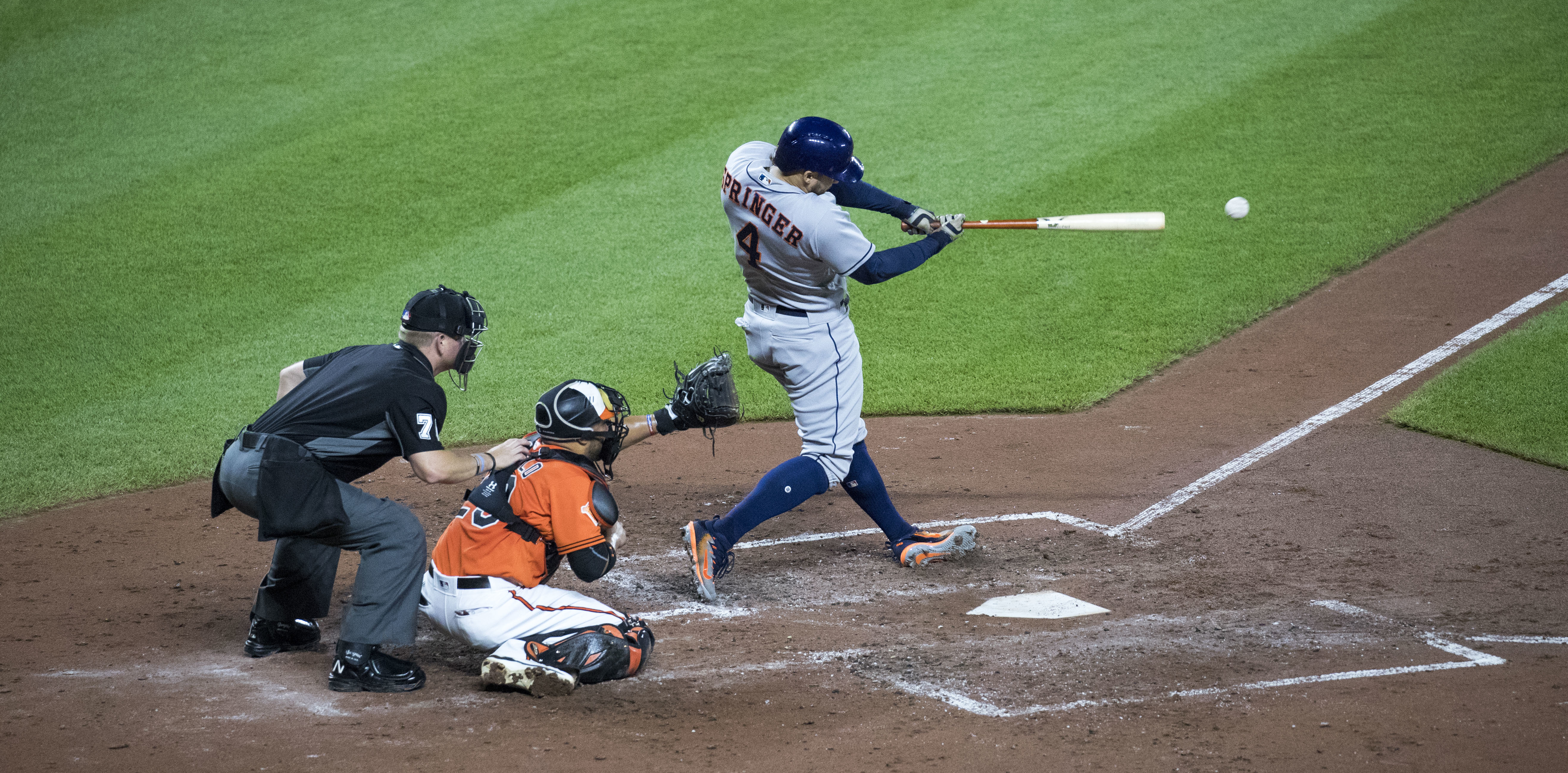
George Springer connected for five home runs on the way to being named World Series MVP.

In Game 3, Yu Darvish started for the Dodgers against Lance McCullers Jr. for the Astros. The Astros scored four runs in the bottom of the second inning on a home run by Yuli Gurriel and RBIs by González, Brian McCann, and Alex Bregman. Darvish left the game after 1 2/3 innings, which is the shortest outing of his career (he would tie that feat in Game 7, that time giving up five runs). In the top of the third, McCullers loaded the bases with three consecutive walks. The Dodgers managed to score one run when Corey Seager grounded into a double play. The Astros added another run in the fifth on an RBI single by Evan Gattis and the Dodgers added two in the sixth on an RBI groundout by Puig and a wild pitch. McCullers wound up pitching 5 1/3 innings and allowed three runs on four hits. Brad Peacock replaced McCullers, completing the final 3 2/3 innings with no hits allowed and four strikeouts to earn his first major league save. It was the longest hitless World Series relief outing since Ron Taylor's four innings in Game 4 of the 1964 Series, and tied Ken Clay for the longest hitless postseason save, first accomplished in the 1978 ALCS.

Game 5 featured a "roller coaster" of momentum changes induced by key home runs. The Astros fell behind by scores of 4–0, 7–4, and 8–7, but hit a game-tying home run to reduce each deficit. They eventually led 12–9 in the ninth inning, but the Dodgers made their own comeback to tie the game at 12 with a home run from Puig and an RBI single from Chris Taylor. In the bottom of the 10th, Alex Bregman singled to left field off Dodgers closer Kenley Jansen to score pinch runner Derek Fisher for the walk-off hit. That single concluded the second-longest game in World Series history, running at five hours, 17 minutes. Doug Miller of MLB.com ranked World Series Game 5 as the top game of 2017.

Springer homered and doubled in Game 7, finishing with two runs and two RBI. He hit five home runs, tying the World Series record shared by Reggie Jackson and Dodgers second baseman Chase Utley. He also homered in each of the final four games, setting a World Series record for consecutive games with a home run. Springer was named the World Series Most Valuable Player (MVP), hitting 11 of 29 at bats and driving in seven as the Astros' leadoff hitter.

Three years earlier, Springer had been featured on a 2014 cover of Sports Illustrated magazine that heralded a World Series win for the Astros in 2017.

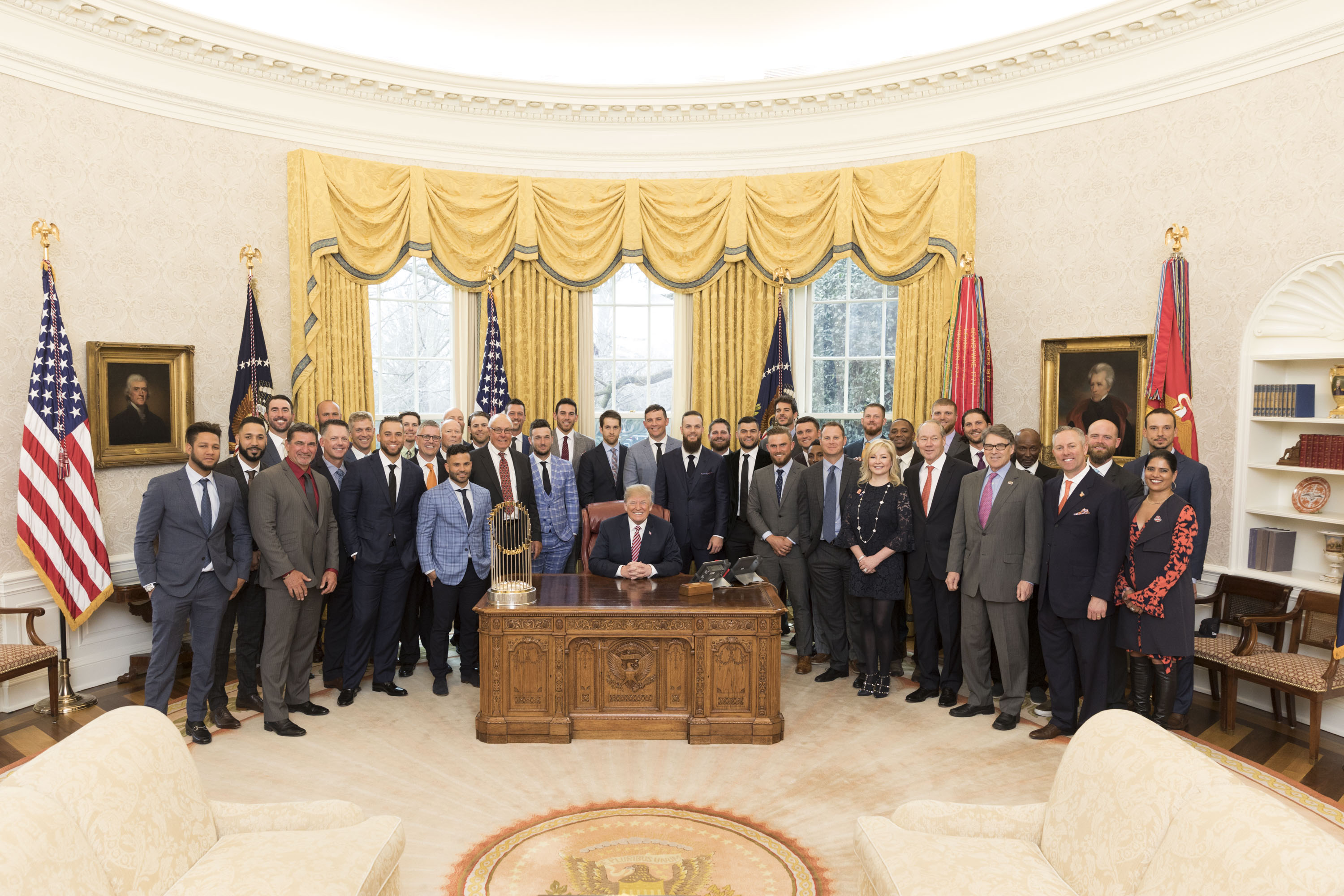
President Trump poses with the Astros at the White House following their World Series win.

Altuve and Verlander were named co-winners of the Babe Ruth Award as MVPs of the Astros' postseason. In the Astros' 18-game championship run, Altuve batted .310/.388/.634, 22 hits, 14 runs scored, seven home runs, 14 RBI, and nine extra-base hits. Altuve established a franchise record for total hits in a postseason. Further, he tied the record for home runs by a second baseman in a single postseason, and hit the fourth-most among all players. Verlander made six appearances and five starts, being credited with a 4–1 record, and gaining a 2.21 ERA, .177 batting average against, eight walks, and 38 strikeouts in 36 2/3 innings.

Weeks after the end of the World Series, an unidentified Astros player revealed that Darvish was tipping his pitches. He cycled through 3 1/3 IP in two World Series starts and allowed a 21.60 ERA, while striking out no Houston batters. He was much more successful in the NLDS and NLCS, allowing two earned runs over 11 1/3 IP with 14 strikeouts.

Altuve, along with Houston Texans defensive end J. J. Watt, were named co-winners of the Sports Illustrated Sportsperson of the Year Award for his efforts in leading the Astros to their first World Series title and aiding in the recovery of the Greater Houston area in the aftermath of Hurricane Harvey.

By winning the World Series following their World Baseball Classic championship as members of Team USA prior to the start of the season, Alex Bregman and Luke Gregerson became the first players to claim both titles during the same calendar year.

Following the conclusion of the World Series, Beltrán announced his retirement from his professional baseball.

=== Postseason rosters ===
Playoff rosters
American League Division Series

- Pitchers: 35 Justin Verlander 36 Will Harris 41 Brad Peacock 43 Lance McCullers Jr. 44 Luke Gregerson 46 Francisco Liriano 47 Chris Devenski 50 Charlie Morton 53 Ken Giles 59 Joe Musgrove 60 Dallas Keuchel
- Catchers: 11 Evan Gattis 16 Brian McCann 30 Juan Centeno
- Infielders: 1 Carlos Correa 2 Alex Bregman 10 Yuli Gurriel 13 Tyler White 27 Jose Altuve
- Outfielders: 3 Cameron Maybin 4 George Springer 9 Marwin González 21 Derek Fisher 22 Josh Reddick
- Designated hitters: 15 Carlos Beltrán

American League Championship Series

- Pitchers: 31 Collin McHugh 35 Justin Verlander 36 Will Harris 41 Brad Peacock 43 Lance McCullers Jr. 44 Luke Gregerson 46 Francisco Liriano 47 Chris Devenski 50 Charlie Morton 53 Ken Giles 59 Joe Musgrove 60 Dallas Keuchel
- Catchers: 11 Evan Gattis 16 Brian McCann 30 Juan Centeno
- Infielders: 1 Carlos Correa 2 Alex Bregman 10 Yuli Gurriel 27 Jose Altuve
- Outfielders: 3 Cameron Maybin 4 George Springer 9 Marwin González 21 Derek Fisher 22 Josh Reddick
- Designated hitters: 15 Carlos Beltrán

World Series

- Pitchers: 31 Collin McHugh 35 Justin Verlander 36 Will Harris 41 Brad Peacock 43 Lance McCullers Jr. 44 Luke Gregerson 46 Francisco Liriano 47 Chris Devenski 50 Charlie Morton 53 Ken Giles 59 Joe Musgrove 60 Dallas Keuchel
- Catchers: 11 Evan Gattis 16 Brian McCann 30 Juan Centeno
- Infielders: 1 Carlos Correa 2 Alex Bregman 10 Yuli Gurriel 27 Jose Altuve
- Outfielders: 3 Cameron Maybin 4 George Springer 9 Marwin González 21 Derek Fisher 22 Josh Reddick
- Designated hitters: 15 Carlos Beltrán

== Game log ==
=== Regular season ===
2017 Game Log: 101–61 (Home: 48–33; Away: 53–28)
April: 16–9 (Home: 9–5; Away: 7–4)

#	Date	Opponent	Score	Win	Loss	Save	Attendance	Record	Streak
1	April 3	Mariners	3–0	**Keuchel** (1–0)	Hernández (0–1)	**Giles** (1)	41,678	1–0	W1
2	April 4	Mariners	2–1	**McCullers** (1–0)	Iwakuma (0–1)	**Giles** (2)	21,406	2–0	W2
3	April 5	Mariners	5–3 (13)	**Peacock** (1–0)	De Jong (0–1)	—	20,303	3–0	W3
4	April 6	Mariners	2–4	Altavilla (1–0)	**Giles** (0–1)	Diaz (1)	18,362	3–1	L1
5	April 7	Royals	1–5	Vargas (1–0)	**Fiers** (0–1)	—	30,491	3–2	L2
6	April 8	Royals	3–7	Duffy (1–0)	**Gregerson** (0–1)	—	35,373	3–3	L3
7	April 9	Royals	5–4 (12)	**Devenski** (1–0)	Strahm (0–2)	—	32,411	4–3	W1
8	April 10	@ Mariners	0–6	Paxton (1–0)	**Morton** (0–1)	—	44,856	4–4	L1
9	April 11	@ Mariners	7–5	**Musgrove** (1–0)	Miranda (0–1)	—	18,527	5–4	W1
10	April 12	@ Mariners	10–5	**Peacock** (2–0)	Altavilla (1–1)	—	14,479	6–4	W2
11	April 14	@ Athletics	7–2	**Keuchel** (2–0)	Madson (0–1)	—	15,385	7–4	W3
12	April 15	@ Athletics	10–6	**Harris** (1-0)	Casilla (0-1)		20,140	8–4	W4
—	April 16	@ Athletics	Postponed (rain). Makeup date: September 9.						
13	April 17	Angels	3–0	**Morton** (1–1)	Chavez (1–2)	**Giles** (3)	23,501	9–4	W5
14	April 18	Angels	2–5	Nolasco (1–2)	**Musgrove** (1–1)	Bedrosian (3)	21,760	9–5	L1
15	April 19	Angels	5–1	**Kechuel** (3–0)	Ramírez (2–2)	—	24,028	10–5	W1
16	April 20	Angels	2–1	**McCullers** (2–0)	Shoemaker (0–1)	**Devenski** (1)	23,173	11–5	W2
17	April 21	@ Rays	6–3	**Feliz** (1-0)	Cobb (1-2)	**Giles** (4)	17,683	12–5	W3
18	April 22	@ Rays	3–6	Pruitt (2–0)	**Morton** (1–2)	Colomé (4)	17,008	12–6	L1
19	April 23	@ Rays	6–4 (10)	**Gregerson** (1–1)	Garton (0–1)	**Giles** (5)	15,548	13–6	W1
20	April 25	@ Indians	4–2	**Keuchel** (4–0)	Tomlin (1–3)	—	14,581	14–6	W2
21	April 26	@ Indians	6–7	Bauer (2–2)	**McCullers** (2–1)	Allen (4)	16,052	14–7	L1
22	April 27	@ Indians	3–4	Kluber (3–1)	**Devenski** (1–1)	Allen (5)	14,452	14–8	L2
23	April 28	Athletics	9–4	**Morton** (2–2)	Cotton (2–3)	—	28,472	15–8	W1
24	April 29	Athletics	1–2	Triggs (4–1)	**Musgrove** (1–2)	Casilla (4)	32,147	15–9	L1
25	April 30	Athletics	7–2	**Keuchel** (5–0)	Hahn (1–2)	**Giles** (6)	34,880	16–9	W1

May: 22–7 (Home: 11–5; Away: 11–2)

#	Date	Opponent	Score	Win	Loss	Save	Attendance	Record	Streak
26	May 1	Rangers	6–2	**Devenski** (2–1)	Cashner (0–3)	**Giles** (7)	22,556	17–9	W2
27	May 2	Rangers	8–7	**Hoyt** (1–0)	Kela (0–1)	**Harris** (1)	26,208	18–9	W3
28	May 3	Rangers	10–1	**Morton** (3–2)	Martinez (0–1)	—	27,439	19–9	W4
29	May 4	Rangers	4–10	Griffin (3–0)	**Musgrove** (1–3)	—	27,391	19–10	L1
30	May 5	@ Angels	7–6 (10)	**Giles** (1–1)	Norris (0–1)	**Devenski** (2)	34,556	20–10	W1
31	May 6	@ Angels	1–2	Norris (1–1)	**Devenski** (2–2)	—	41,097	20–11	L1
32	May 7	@ Angels	5–3	**Fiers** (1–1)	Shoemaker (1–2)	**Giles** (8)	38,383	21–11	W1
33	May 9	Braves	8–3	**Morton** (4–2)	Colón (1–4)	—	28,724	22–11	W2
34	May 10	Braves	4–2	**Musgrove** (2–3)	García (1–2)	**Giles** (9)	23,676	23–11	W3
35	May 11	@ Yankees	3–2	**Keuchel** (6–0)	Pineda (3–2)	**Giles** (10)	39,050	24–11	W4
36	May 12	@ Yankees	5–1	**McCullers** (3–1)	Montgomery (2–2)	—	41,150	25–11	W5
—	May 13	@ Yankees	Postponed (inclement weather). Makeup date: May 14.						
37	May 14 (1)	@ Yankees	6–11	Warren (1–0)	**Harris** (1–1)	—	47,883	25–12	L1
38	May 14 (2)	@ Yankees	10–7	**Morton** (5–2)	Tanaka (5–2)	—	47,883	26–12	W1
39	May 15	@ Marlins	7–2	**Musgrove** (3–3)	Tazawa (1–1)	—	16,448	27–12	W2
40	May 16	@ Marlins	12–2	**Keuchel** (7–0)	Koehler (1–2)	—	18,056	28–12	W3
41	May 17	@ Marlins	3–0	**McCullers** (4–1)	Ureña (1–2)	**Giles** (11)	24,699	29–12	W4
42	May 19	Indians	3–5	Bauer (4–4)	**Morton** (5–3)	Allen (11)	36,446	29–13	L1
43	May 20	Indians	0–3	Clevinger (2–1)	**Fiers** (1–2)	Allen (12)	34,698	29–14	L2
44	May 21	Indians	6–8	Salazar (3–4)	**Musgrove** (3–4)	—	33,476	29–15	L3
45	May 22	Tigers	1–0	**Devenski** (3–2)	Fulmer (5–2)	**Giles** (12)	22,146	30–15	W1
46	May 23	Tigers	6–2	**McCullers** (5–1)	Zimmermann (4–3)	—	23,179	31–15	W2
47	May 24	Tigers	3–6	Greene (1–0)	**Devenski** (3–3)	—	26,481	31–16	L1
48	May 25	Tigers	7–6	**Gregerson** (2–1)	Wilson (1–2)	**Giles** (13)	25,046	32–16	W1
49	May 26	Orioles	2–0	**Musgrove** (4–4)	Gausman (2–4)	**Giles** (14)	31,380	33–16	W2
50	May 27	Orioles	5–2	**Keuchel** (8–0)	Miley (1–3)	**Harris** (2)	32,761	34–16	W3
51	May 28	Orioles	8–4	**McCullers** (6–1)	Asher (1–3)	—	34,720	35–16	W4
52	May 29	@ Twins	16–8	**Jankowski** (1–0)	Breslow (1–1)	—	24,272	36–16	W5
53	May 30	@ Twins	7–2	**Fiers** (2–2)	Berríos (3–1)	—	22,616	37–16	W6
54	May 31	@ Twins	17–6	**Feliz** (2–0)	Santiago (4–5)	—	25,593	38–16	W7

June: 16–11 (Home: 5–8; Away: 11–3)

#	Date	Opponent	Score	Win	Loss	Save	Attendance	Record	Streak
55	June 2	@ Rangers	7–1	**Keuchel** (9–0)	Darvish (5–4)	—	39,729	39–16	W8
56	June 3	@ Rangers	6–5	**Devenski** (4–3)	Cashner (2–5)	**Giles** (15)	44,168	40–16	W9
57	June 4	@ Rangers	7–2	**Peacock** (3–0)	Pérez (2–6)	—	39,204	41–16	W10
58	June 5	@ Royals	7–3	**Fiers** (3–2)	Kennedy (0–6)	—	21,892	42–16	W11
59	June 6	@ Royals	7–9	Minor (3–1)	**Giles** (1–2)	—	20,974	42–17	L1
60	June 7	@ Royals	5–7	Vargas (8–3)	**Díaz** (0–1)	Herrera (13)	25,628	42–18	L2
61	June 8	@ Royals	6–1	**Harris** (2–1)	Herrera (1–2)	—	32,747	43–18	W1
62	June 9	Angels	4–9	Shoemaker (6–3)	**Peacock** (3–1)	—	40,786	43–19	L1
63	June 10	Angels	3–1	**Fiers** (4–2)	Nolasco (2–7)	**Giles** (16)	41,296	44–19	W1
64	June 11	Angels	6–12	Middleton (1–0)	**Feliz** (2–1)	—	32,425	44–20	L1
65	June 12	Rangers	1–6	Darvish (6–4)	**Musgrove** (4–5)	—	25,698	44–21	L2
66	June 13	Rangers	2–4	Leclerc (1–1)	**Gregerson** (2–2)	Bush (8)	27,615	44–22	L3
67	June 14	Rangers	13–2	**Martes** (1–0)	Cashner (3–6)	—	37,221	45–22	W1
68	June 16	Red Sox	1–2	Kelly (3–0)	**Harris** (2–2)	Kimbrel (19)	36,189	45–23	L1
69	June 17	Red Sox	7–1	**Paulino** (1–0)	Porcello (3–9)	—	41,017	46–23	W1
70	June 18	Red Sox	5–6	Price (2–1)	**Musgrove** (4–6)	Kimbrel (20)	38,389	46–24	L1
71	June 19	@ Athletics	4–1	**Peacock** (4–1)	Gossett (0–2)	**Giles** (17)	10,482	47–24	W1
72	June 20	@ Athletics	8–4	**Martes** (2–0)	Gray (2–3)	—	15,362	48–24	W2
73	June 21	@ Athletics	5–1	**Fiers** (5–2)	Manaea (6–4)	—	12,277	49–24	W3
74	June 22	@ Athletics	12–9	**Paulino** (2–0)	Hahn (3–5)	**Devenski** (3)	18,747	50–24	W4
75	June 23	@ Mariners	3–13	Hernández (3–2)	**Musgrove** (4–7)	Gallardo (1)	31,783	50–25	L1
76	June 24	@ Mariners	5–2	**McCullers** (7–1)	Gaviglio (3–2)	—	29,820	51–25	W1
77	June 25	@ Mariners	8–2	**Feliz** (3–1)	Miranda (6–4)	—	33,010	52–25	W2
78	June 27	Athletics	4–6	Manaea (7–4)	**Fiers** (5–3)	Casilla (14)	28,312	52–26	L1
79	June 28	Athletics	11–8	**Feliz** (4–1)	Hahn (3–6)	**Giles** (18)	34,075	53–26	W1
80	June 29	Athletics	6–1	**Peacock** (5–1)	Gossett (1–3)	—	29,509	54–26	W2
81	June 30	Yankees	4–13	Pineda (8–4)	**Feliz** (4–2)	Mitchell (1)	40,024	54–27	L1

July: 15–9 (Home: 6–3; Away: 9–6)

#	Date	Opponent	Score	Win	Loss	Save	Attendance	Record	Streak
82	July 1	Yankees	7–6	**Diaz** (1–1)	Betances (3–3)	**Giles** (19)	41,010	55–27	W1
83	July 2	Yankees	8–1	**Devenski** (5–3)	Severino (5–4)	—	41,761	56–27	W2
84	July 4	@ Braves	16–4	**Peacock** (6–1)	Newcomb (1–3)	—	41,456	57–27	W3
85	July 5	@ Braves	10–4	**Devenski** (6–3)	García (2–7)	—	37,278	58–27	W4
86	July 6	@ Blue Jays	4–7	Liriano (5–4)	**McCullers** (7–2)	Osuna (22)	40,949	58–28	L1
87	July 7	@ Blue Jays	12–2	**Morton** (6–3)	Sanchez (0–2)	—	37,332	59–28	W1
88	July 8	@ Blue Jays	2–7	Stroman (9–5)	**Fiers** (5–4)	—	46,659	59–29	L1
89	July 9	@ Blue Jays	19–1	**Peacock** (7–1)	Happ (3–6)	—	46,622	60–29	W1
**88th All-Star Game in Miami, Florida**
90	July 14	Twins	10–5	**Morton** (7–3)	Berríos (8–3)	—	38,006	61–29	W2
91	July 15	Twins	2–4	Santana (11–6)	**Musgrove** (4–8)	Kintzler (25)	41,038	61–30	L1
92	July 16	Twins	5–2	**Fiers** (6–4)	Gibson (5–8)	**Giles** (20)	38,253	62–30	W1
93	July 17	Mariners	7–9 (10)	Gallardo (4–7)	**Sipp** (0–1)	Díaz (17)	24,701	62–31	L1
94	July 18	Mariners	6–2	**Peacock** (8–1)	Gaviglio (3–5)	**Gregerson** (1)	27,111	63–31	W1
95	July 19	Mariners	1–4	Paxton (9–3)	**Morton** (7–4)	Díaz (18)	35,191	63–32	L1
96	July 21	@ Orioles	8–7	**Fiers** (7–4)	Jiménez (4–6)	**Giles** (21)	25,784	64–32	W1
97	July 22	@ Orioles	8–4	**Martes** (3–0)	O'Day (1–3)	—	32,524	65–32	W2
98	July 23	@ Orioles	7–9	Givens (7–0)	**Gregerson** (2–3)	Britton (6)	21,533	65–33	L1
99	July 24	@ Phillies	13–4	**Musgrove** (5–8)	Velasquez (2–6)	—	17,567	66–33	W1
100	July 25	@ Phillies	5–0	**Morton** (8–4)	Pivetta (3–6)	—	17,176	67–33	W2
101	July 26	@ Phillies	0–9	Nola (8–6)	**Fiers** (7–5)	—	19,718	67–34	L1
102	July 28	@ Tigers	6–5	**Peacock** (9–1)	Rondón (1–2)	**Giles** (22)	30,358	68–34	W1
103	July 29	@ Tigers	3–5	Boyd (5–5)	**Martes** (3–1)	J. Wilson (13)	33,766	68–35	L1
104	July 30	@ Tigers	1–13	Verlander (6–7)	**McCullers** (7–3)	—	31,970	68–36	L2
105	July 31	Rays	14–7	**Morton** (9–4)	Cobb (9–7)	—	24,154	69–36	W1

August: 11–17 (Home: 7–10; Away: 4–7)

#	Date	Opponent	Score	Win	Loss	Save	Attendance	Record	Streak
106	August 1	Rays	4–6	Archer (8–6)	**Fiers** (7–6)	Colomé (31)	22,985	69–37	L1
107	August 2	Rays	0–3	Pruitt (6–2)	**Keuchel** (9–1)	Colomé (32)	26,722	69–38	L2
108	August 3	Rays	3–5	Boxberger (3–3)	**Liriano** (6–6)	Colomé (33)	23,404	69–39	L3
109	August 4	Blue Jays	16–7	**Peacock** (10–1)	Valdez (1–1)	—	39,287	70–39	W1
110	August 5	Blue Jays	5–6 (10)	Tepera (6–1)	**Liriano** (6–7)	Osuna (28)	41,950	70–40	L1
111	August 6	Blue Jays	7–6	**Martes** (4–1)	Osuna (3–3)	—	36,300	71–40	W1
112	August 8	@ White Sox	5–8	Holland (6–11)	**Keuchel** (9–2)	Clippard (2)	13,974	71–41	L1
113	August 9	@ White Sox	1–7	González (6–10)	**McHugh** (0–1)	—	14,824	71–42	L2
114	August 10	@ White Sox	2–3 (11)	Holmberg (2–3)	**Martes** (4–2)	—	18,034	71–43	L3
115	August 11	@ Rangers	4–6	Hamels (7–1)	**Morton** (9–5)	—	33,897	71–44	L4
116	August 12	@ Rangers	3–8	Ross (3–2)	**Fiers** (7–7)	—	47,306	71–45	L5
117	August 13	@ Rangers	2–1	**Keuchel** (10–2)	Cashner (7–9)	**Giles** (26)	31,517	72–45	W1
118	August 14	@ D-backs	0–2	Greinke (14–5)	**McHugh** (0–2)	Rodney (27)	20,405	72–46	L1
119	August 15	@ D-backs	9–4	**Martes** (5–2)	Banda (1–3)	—	16,935	73–46	W1
120	August 16	D-backs	9–5	**Morton** (10–5)	Walker (6–7)	—	27,278	74–46	W2
121	August 17	D-backs	0–4	Corbin (10–11)	**Fiers** (7–8)	—	27,949	74–47	L1
122	August 18	Athletics	3–1	**Keuchel** (11–2)	Manaea (8–8)	**Giles** (24)	30,908	75–47	W1
123	August 19	Athletics	3–0	**McHugh** (1–2)	Graveman (3–4)	**Clippard** (4)	32,796	76–47	W2
124	August 20	Athletics	2–3	Cotton (6–10)	**Peacock** (10–2)	Treinen (7)	34,011	76–48	L1
125	August 22	Nationals	3–4	Roark (10–8)	**Morton** (10–6)	Doolittle (15)	23,798	76–49	L2
126	August 23	Nationals	6–1	**Fiers** (8–8)	Jackson (4–3)	—	23,434	77–49	W1
127	August 24	Nationals	4–5 (11)	Albers (7–2)	**Clippard** (2–7)	Solis (1)	24,761	77–50	L1
128	August 25	@ Angels	2–1	**McHugh** (2–2)	Bridwell (7–2)	**Giles** (25)	42,333	78–50	W1
129	August 26	@ Angels	6–7	**Wood** (2–4)	Clippard (2–8)	**Parker** (2)	41,101	78–51	L1
130	August 27	@ Angels	7–5	**Musgrove** (6–8)	Bedrosian (3–3)	**Giles** (26)	37,606	79–51	W1
131	August 29	Rangers (Note: Games moved to Tropicana Field for flooding concerns due to Hurricane Harvey.)	2–12	Pérez (10–10)	**Fiers** (8–9)	—	3,485	79–52	L1
132	August 30	Rangers	1–8	Cashner (8–9)	**Keuchel** (11–3)	—	6,123	79–53	L2
133	August 31	Rangers	5–1	**Devenski** (7–3)	Martinez (3–6)	**Giles** (27)	3,385	80–53	W1

September: 20–8 (Home: 10–2; Away: 10–6)

#	Date	Opponent	Score	Win	Loss	Save	Attendance	Record	Streak
134	September 2 (1)	Mets	12–8	**Morton** (11–6)	Harvey (4–4)	—	30,319	81–53	W2
135	September 2 (2)	Mets	4–1	**Musgrove** (7–8)	Lugo (5–4)	**Giles** (28)	34,904	82–53	W3
136	September 3	Mets	8–6	**Harris** (3–2)	Flexen (3–4)	**Devenski** (4)	32,065	83–53	W4
137	September 4	@ Mariners	6–2	**Keuchel** (12–3)	Rzepczynski (2–1)	—	20,108	84–53	W5
138	September 5	@ Mariners	3–1	**Verlander** (11–8)	Pazos (4–5)	**Giles** (29)	14,568	85–53	W6
139	September 6	@ Mariners	5–3	**Devenski** (8–3)	Díaz (3–6)	—	15,104	86–53	W7
140	September 8	@ Athletics	8–9	Treinen (2–6)	**Giles** (1–3)	—	12,288	86–54	L1
141	September 9 (1)	@ Athletics	1–11	Gossett (4–8)	**Morton** (11–7)	—		86–55	L2
142	September 9 (2)	@ Athletics	4–11	Hatcher (1–2)	**Devenski** (8–4)	—	19,244	86–56	L3
143	September 10	@ Athletics	2–10	Graveman (5–4)	**Keuchel** (12–4)	—	15,892	86–57	L4
144	September 12	@ Angels	1–0	**Verlander** (12–8)	Richards (0–1)	**Giles** (30)	36,088	87–57	W1
145	September 13	@ Angels	1–9	Skaggs (2–5)	**Fiers** (8–10)	—	33,899	87–58	L1
146	September 14	@ Angels	5–2	**Peacock** (11–2)	Nolasco (6–14)	—	35,715	88–58	W1
147	September 15	Mariners	5–2	**Morton** (12–7)	Paxton (12–4)	**Giles** (31)	28,328	89–58	W2
148	September 16	Mariners	8–6	**Keuchel** (13–4)	Ramírez (5–6)	**Musgrove** (1)	33,650	90–58	W3
149	September 17	Mariners	7–1	**Verlander** (13–8)	Moore (1–4)	—	30,247	91–58	W4
150	September 19	White Sox	3–1	**McHugh** (3–2)	Giolito (2–3)	**Giles** (32)	23,293	92–58	W5
151	September 20	White Sox	4–3	**Peacock** (12–2)	Shields (4–7)	**Musgrove** (2)	24,995	93–58	W6
152	September 21	White Sox	1–3	Volstad (1–0)	**Keuchel** (13–5)	Minaya (5)	24,283	93–59	L1
153	September 22	Angels	3–0	**Verlander** (14–8)	Petit (5–2)	**Giles** (33)	34,127	94–59	W1
154	September 23	Angels	6–2	**Morton** (13–7)	Norris (2–6)	—	34,035	95–59	W2
155	September 24	Angels	5–7	Middleton (6–1)	**Devenski** (8–5)	Parker (7)	36,756	95–60	L1
156	September 25	@ Rangers	11–2	**McHugh** (4–2)	Cashner (10–11)	—	30,390	96–60	W1
157	September 26	@ Rangers	14–3	**Keuchel** (14–5)	Hamels (11–5)	—	28,976	97–60	W2
158	September 27	@ Rangers	12–2	**Verlander** (15–8)	Martinez (3–8)	—	26,053	98–60	W3
159	September 28	@ Red Sox	12–2	**Peacock** (13–2)	Rodriguez (6–7)	—	34,222	99–60	W4
160	September 29	@ Red Sox	3–2	**Morton** (14–7)	Fister (5–9)	**Giles** (34)	36,623	100–60	W5
161	September 30	@ Red Sox	3–6	Pomeranz (17–6)	**McCullers** (7–4)	—	35,722	100–61	L1

October: 1–0 (Home: 0–0; Away: 1–0)

#	Date	Opponent	Score	Win	Loss	Save	Attendance	Record	Streak
162	October 1	@ Red Sox	4–3	**McHugh** (5–2)	Abad (2–1)	**Clippard** (5)	34,517	101–61	W1

Legend: = Win = Loss = Postponement
Bold = Astros team member

=== Postseason ===
2017 Postseason Game Log (11–7)
AL Division Series (3–1)

#	Date	Opponent	Score	Win	Loss	Save	Attendance	Series
1	October 5	Red Sox	8–2	**Verlander** (1–0)	Sale (0–1)	—	43,102	1–0
2	October 6	Red Sox	8–2	**Keuchel** (1–0)	Pomeranz (0–1)	—	43,410	2–0
3	October 8	@ Red Sox	3–10	Kelly (1–0)	**Liriano** (0–1)	—	38,010	2–1
4	October 9	@ Red Sox	5–4	**Verlander** (2–0)	Sale (0–2)	**Giles** (1)	37,305	3–1

AL Championship Series (4–3)

#	Date	Opponent	Score	Win	Loss	Save	Attendance	Series
1	October 13	Yankees	2–1	**Keuchel** (1–0)	Tanaka (0–1)	**Giles** (1)	43,116	1–0
2	October 14	Yankees	2–1	**Verlander** (1–0)	Chapman (0–1)	—	43,193	2–0
3	October 16	@ Yankees	1–8	Sabathia (1–0)	**Morton** (0–1)	—	49,373	2–1
4	October 17	@ Yankees	4–6	Green (1–0)	**Giles** (0–1)	Chapman (1)	48,804	2–2
5	October 18	@ Yankees	0–5	Tanaka (1–1)	**Keuchel** (1–1)	—	49,647	2–3
6	October 20	Yankees	7–1	**Verlander** (2–0)	Severino (0–1)	—	43,179	3–3
7	October 21	Yankees	4–0	**Morton** (1–1)	Sabathia (1–1)	**McCullers** (1)	43,201	4–3

World Series (4–3)

#	Date	Opponent	Score	Win	Loss	Save	Attendance	Series
1	October 24	@ Dodgers	1–3	Kershaw (1–0)	**Keuchel** (0–1)	Jansen (1)	54,253	0–1
2	October 25	@ Dodgers	7–6 (11)	**Devenski** (1–0)	McCarthy (0–1)	—	54,293	1–1
3	October 27	Dodgers	5–3	**McCullers** (1–0)	Darvish (0–1)	**Peacock** (1)	43,282	2–1
4	October 28	Dodgers	2–6	Watson (1–0)	**Giles** (0–1)	—	43,322	2–2
5	October 29	Dodgers	13–12 (10)	**Musgrove** (1–0)	Jansen (0–1)	—	43,300	3–2
6	October 31	@ Dodgers	1–3	Watson (2–0)	**Verlander** (0–1)	Jansen (2)	54,128	3–3
7	November 1	@ Dodgers	5–1	**Morton** (1–0)	Darvish (0–2)	—	54,124	4–3

== Roster ==
2017 Houston Astros
Roster
Pitchers: 19 Tyler Clippard; 47 Chris Devenski; 38 Dayán Díaz; 45 Michael Feliz; 54 Mike Fiers; 53 Ken Giles; 44 Luke Gregerson; 64 Reymin Guduan; 61 Jandel Gustave; 36 Will Harris; 51 James Hoyt; 65 Jordan Jankowski; 60 Dallas Keuchel; 35,46 Francisco Liriano; 58 Francis Martes; 43 Lance McCullers Jr.; 31 Collin McHugh; 50 Charlie Morton; 59 Joe Musgrove; 63 David Paulino; 41 Brad Peacock; 29 Tony Sipp; 46 Ashur Tolliver; 35 Justin Verlander	Catchers: 30 Juan Centeno; 11 Evan Gattis; 16 Brian McCann; 12 Max Stassi; Infielders: 27 Jose Altuve; 2 Alex Bregman; 1 Carlos Correa; 28 J. D. Davis; 9 Marwin González; 10 Yuli Gurriel; 8,19,38 Colin Moran; 23 A. J. Reed; 13 Tyler White	Outfielders: 3 Nori Aoki; 15 Carlos Beltrán; 21 Derek Fisher; 35 Teoscar Hernández; 18 Tony Kemp; 6 Jake Marisnick; 3 Cameron Maybin; 22 Josh Reddick; 4 George Springer	Manager: 14 A. J. Hinch; Coaches: 52 Craig Bjornson (bullpen); 85 Javier Bracamonte (bullpen catcher); 26 Alex Cora (bench); 48 Rich Dauer (first base); 39 Dave Hudgens (hitting); 96 Carlos Muñoz (bullpen catcher); 8 Gary Pettis (third base); 55 Alonzo Powell (assistant hitting); 56 Brent Strom (pitching)

== Player statistics ==
Table legend
League leader (Bold: MLB leader)	League top ten	*	Left-handed batter or pitcher	Leader in appearances at position
League top ten (multiple teams)	Team leader	#	Switch hitter	

=== Batting ===
Abbreviations key

- G — games played
- AB — at bats
- R — runs
- H — hits
- 2B — doubles
- 3B — triples
- HR — home runs
- RBI — runs batted in
- SB — stolen bases
- BB — bases on balls
- AVG — batting average
- OBP — on-base percentage
- SLG — slugging percentage
- TB — total bases

Regular season batting results
Player	G	AB	R	H	2B	3B	HR	RBI	SB	BB	SO	AVG	OBP	SLG	TB
Jose Altuve	153	590	112	204	39	4	24	81	32	58	84	**.346**	.410	.547	323
Norichika Aoki*	71	202	28	55	12	1	2	19	5	15	29	.272	.323	.371	75
Carlos Beltrán^{#}	129	467	60	108	29	0	14	51	0	33	102	.231	.283	.383	179
Alex Bregman	155	556	88	158	39	5	19	71	17	55	97	.284	.352	.475	264
Juan Centeno*	22	52	5	12	0	0	2	4	0	4	12	.231	.286	.346	18
Carlos Correa	109	422	82	133	25	1	24	84	2	53	92	.315	.391	.550	232
J. D. Davis	25	62	8	14	4	0	4	7	1	4	20	.226	.279	.484	30
Chris Devenski	3	1	0	0	0	0	0	0	0	0	1	.000	.000	.000	0
Michael Feliz	46	1	0	0	0	0	0	0	0	0	1	.000	.000	.000	0
Mike Fiers	30	1	1	0	0	0	0	0	0	0	1	.000	.000	.000	0
Derek Fisher*	53	146	21	31	4	1	5	17	3	17	54	.212	.307	.356	52
Evan Gattis	84	300	41	79	22	0	12	55	0	18	50	.263	.311	.457	137
Marwin González^{#}	134	455	67	138	34	0	23	90	8	49	99	.303	.377	.530	241
Yuli Gurriel	139	529	69	158	43	1	18	75	3	22	62	.299	.332	.486	257
Teoscar Hernández	1	0	0	0	0	0	0	0	0	0	0	—	—	—	—
James Hoyt	3	1	0	0	0	0	0	0	0	0	1	.000	.000	.000	0
Tony Kemp*	17	37	6	8	1	0	0	4	1	1	5	.216	.256	.243	9
Dallas Keuchel*	23	3	0	0	0	0	0	0	0	0	2	.000	.000	.000	0
Jake Marisnick	106	230	50	56	10	0	16	35	9	20	90	.243	.319	.496	114
Cameron Maybin*	21	59	6	11	1	1	4	13	4	3	16	.186	.226	.441	26
Brian McCann*	97	349	47	84	12	1	18	62	1	38	58	.241	.323	.436	152
Collin McHugh	1	2	0	0	0	0	0	0	0	0	2	.000	.000	.000	0
Lance McCullers Jr.*	22	3	0	0	0	0	0	0	0	0	0	.000	.000	.000	0
Colin Moran*	7	11	3	4	0	1	1	3	0	1	1	.364	.417	.818	9
Charlie Morton	1	3	0	0	0	0	0	0	0	0	0	.000	.000	.000	0
Joe Musgrove	4	5	0	0	0	0	0	0	0	0	1	.000	.000	.000	0
Brad Peacock	4	7	1	2	1	0	0	2	0	1	3	.286	.375	.409	3
Josh Reddick*	134	477	77	150	34	4	13	82	7	43	72	.314	.363	.484	231
A.J. Reed*	2	6	0	0	0	0	0	0	0	0	1	.000	.000	.000	0
Tony Sipp	46	1	0	0	0	0	0	0	0	0	0	.000	.000	.000	0
George Springer	140	548	112	155	29	0	34	85	5	64	111	.283	.367	.522	286
Max Stassi	14	24	5	4	1	0	2	4	0	6	4	.167	.323	.458	11
Tyler White	22	61	7	17	6	0	3	10	0	4	16	.279	.328	.525	32
**Team totals**	**162**	**5611**	**896**	**1581**	**346**	**20**	**238**	**854**	**98**	**509**	**1087**	**.282**	**.346**	**.478**	**2681**

=== Pitching ===
Abbreviations key

- W — wins
- L — losses
- ERA — earned run average
- G — games pitched
- GS — games started
- SV — saves
- IP — innings pitched
- H — hits allowed
- R — runs allowed
- ER — earned runs allowed
- BB — base on balls allowed
- SO — strikeouts
- WHIP — walks plus hits per inning pitched

Regular season pitching results
Player	W	L	ERA	G	GS	SV	IP	H	R	ER	BB	SO
Norichika Aoki*	0	0	27.00	1	0	0	1.0	1	3	3	2	0
Tyler Clippard*	0	2	6.43	16	0	2	14.0	11	10	10	7	18
J. D. Davis	0	0	0.00	2	0	0	1.2	1	0	0	1	3
Chris Devenski	8	5	2.68	62	0	4	80.2	50	24	24	26	100
Dayan Diaz	1	1	9.00	10	1	0	13.0	17	14	13	4	20
Michael Feliz	4	2	5.63	46	0	0	48.0	53	30	30	22	70
Mike Fiers	8	10	5.22	29	28	0	153.1	157	92	89	62	146
Ken Giles	1	3	2.30	63	0	34	62.2	44	16	16	21	83
Luke Gregerson	2	3	4.57	65	0	1	61.0	62	31	31	20	70
Reymin Guduan	0	0	7.88	22	0	0	16.0	24	14	14	12	16
Jandel Gustave	0	0	5.40	6	0	0	5.0	5	4	3	7	2
Will Harris	3	2	2.98	46	0	2	45.1	37	15	15	7	52
James Hoyt	1	0	4.38	43	0	0	49.1	51	24	24	14	66
Jordan Jankowski	1	0	12.46	3	0	0	4.1	7	6	6	2	5
Dallas Keuchel	14	5	2.90	23	23	0	145.2	116	48	47	47	125
Francisco Liriano*	0	2	4.40	20	0	0	14.1	14	7	7	10	11
Francis Martes	5	2	5.80	32	4	0	54.1	51	40	35	31	69
Lance McCullers Jr.	7	4	4.25	22	22	0	118.2	114	58	56	40	132
Collin McHugh	5	2	3.55	12	12	0	63.1	62	27	25	20	62
Charlie Morton	14	7	3.62	25	25	0	146.2	125	61	59	50	163
Joe Musgrove	7	8	4.77	38	15	2	109.1	117	59	58	28	98
David Paulino	2	0	6.52	6	6	0	29.0	36	21	21	7	34
Brad Peacock	13	2	3.00	34	21	0	132.0	100	44	44	57	161
Tony Sipp	0	1	5.79	46	0	0	37.1	36	25	24	16	39
Ashur Tolliver	0	0	3.60	3	0	0	5.0	4	2	2	4	5
Justin Verlander	5	0	1.06	5	5	0	34.0	17	4	4	5	43
Tyler White	0	0	18.00	1	0	0	1.0	2	2	2	0	2
**Team totals**	**101**	**61**	**4.12**	**162**	**162**	**45**	**1446.0**	**1314**	**700**	**662**	**522**	**1593**
Other: Complete games—Keuchel (1) • 50 IP minimum team qualifier. (Note: Only Verlander qualified for league leaders in rate statistics for pitchers on this team (206 total innings with Detroit and Houston).) • Sources:

== Major League Baseball draft ==
Houston Astros 2017 MLB draft selections
Rd.	Slot	Draftee	Position	School	Origin	Signed	Notes	Bio
1	15	J. B. Bukauskas	Right-handed pitcher	North Carolina	(Virginia)	Y	(Note: MLB debut on April 20, 2021, for the Arizona Diamondbacks)	
2	53	Joe Perez	Third baseman	Archbishop Edward A. McCarthy High	(Florida)	Y	(Note: MLB debut on April 8, 2022, for Houston)	
2	56	Corbin Martin	Right-handed pitcher	Texas A&M • 2017	(Texas)	Y	(Note: MLB debut on May 12, 2019, for Houston)	
2	75	J. J. Matijevic	Second baseman	Arizona • 2017	(Pennsylvania)	Y	(Note: MLB debut on April 22, 2022, for Houston)	
3	91	Tyler Ivey	Right-handed pitcher	Grayson	(Texas)	Y	(Note: MLB debut on May 21, 2021, for Houston)	
4	121	Peter Solomon	Right-handed pitcher	Notre Dame	(Washington, D.C.)	Y	(Note: MLB debut on April 18, 2021, for Houston)	
5	151	Nathan Perry	Catcher	Bassett High	(Virginia)	Y		
6	181	Jake Adams	First baseman	Iowa	(South Dakota)	Y		
7	211	Parker Mushinski	Left-handed pitcher	Texas Tech • 2017	(Texas)	Y	(Note: MLB debut on April 17, 2022, for Houston)	
8	241	Corey Julks	Center fielder	Houston	(Texas)	Y	(Note: MLB debut on March 31, 2023, for Houston)	
9	271	Michael Papierski	Catcher	Louisiana State • 2017	(Illinois)	Y	(Note: MLB debut on May 21, 2022, for the San Francisco Giants)	
10	271	Kyle Serrano	Right-handed pitcher	Tennessee • 2017	(Tennessee)	Y		
11	301	Brandon Bielak	Right-handed pitcher	Notre Dame	(New Jersey)	Y	(Note: MLB debut on July 27, 2020, for Houston)	
13	391	Jake Meyers	Center fielder	Nebraska	(Nebraska)	Y	(Note: MLB debut on August 1, 2021, for Houston)	
21	631	Chas McCormick	Right fielder	Millersville	(Pennsylvania)	Y	(Note: MLB debut on April 1, 2021, for Houston)	
26	781	Josh Rojas	Second baseman	Hawaii	(Arizona)	Y	(Note: MLB debut on August 12, 2019, for the Arizona Diamondbacks)	
35	1051	Trei Cruz	Shortstop	Episcopal High	(Ontario)	N	(Note: Signed with the Detroit Tigers from the 2020 draft.) (Note: MLB debut on June 21, 2026, for Detroit)	

== Awards and achievements ==
=== Grand slams ===
No.	Date	Astros batter	Venue	Inning	Pitcher	Opposing team	Box
1	May 2	Marwin González (Note: 1st MLB grand slam) (Note: Switch-hit, multi-home run game)	Minute Maid Park	8 (Note: Tied score or took lead)	Keone Kela	Texas Rangers	
2	May 14 (Note: Game 2 of doubleheader)	Alex Bregman	Yankee Stadium	1	Masahiro Tanaka	New York Yankees	
3	May 15	Yuli Gurriel	Marlins Park	6	Junichi Tazawa	Miami Marlins	
4	July 4	Josh Reddick	SunTrust Park	9	Jason Motte	Atlanta Braves	
5	September 27	George Springer	Globe Life Park in Arlington	6	Tony Barnette	Texas Rangers	

=== Career honors ===
Astros elected to Baseball Hall of Fame
Individual	Position	Houston Astros career					Induction	
Individual	Position	Uni.	Seasons	Games	Start	Finish	Induction	
Jeff Bagwell	First baseman	5 (Note: Uniform number retired during 2007 season.)	15	2,150	1991	2005	Class	Inducted as an Astro
Iván Rodríguez	Catcher	77	1	93	2009		Class	Plaque
See also: Members of the Baseball Hall of Fame • Sources:

=== Annual awards ===
88th All-Star Game at Marlins Park
Player	Position	Sel.	Ref.
Jose Altuve	Starting second baseman	5th	
Carlos Correa	Starting shortstop	1st	
George Springer	Starting center fielder	1st	
Chris Devenski	Reserve right-handed pitcher	1st	
Dallas Keuchel	Reserve left-handed pitcher	2nd	
Lance McCullers	Reserve right-handed pitcher	1st	

2017 Houston Astros award winners
Name of award		Recipient	Ref.
American League Championship Series Most Valuable Player (ALCS MVP)		Justin Verlander	
American League Most Valuable Player (AL MVP)		Jose Altuve	
American League (AL) Pitcher of the Month	April	Dallas Keuchel	
American League (AL) Pitcher of the Month	May	Lance McCullers Jr.	
American League (AL) Player of the Month	May	Carlos Correa	
American League (AL) Player of the Month	July	Jose Altuve	
American League (AL) Rookie of the Month	July	Yuli Gurriel	
Associated Press Male Athlete of the Year		Jose Altuve	
Babe Ruth Award		Jose Altuve	
Babe Ruth Award		Justin Verlander	
Baseball America	Manager of the Year	A. J. Hinch	
Baseball America	Major League Player of the Year	Jose Altuve	
Baseball Digest Player of the Year		Jose Altuve	
Darryl Kile Good Guy Award		Carlos Correa	
Fred Hartman Award for Long and Meritorious Service to Baseball		Bob Watson	
Hank Aaron Award		Jose Altuve	
Hickok Belt	Annual	Jose Altuve	
Hickok Belt	July	Jose Altuve	
Hickok Belt	October	Jose Altuve	
Hickok Belt	November	George Springer	
Houston-Area (non-Astros) Player of the Year		Paul Goldschmidt	
Houston Astros	Most Valuable Player (MVP)	Jose Altuve	
Houston Astros	Pitcher of the Year	Dallas Keuchel	
Houston Astros	Pitcher of the Year	Brad Peacock	
Houston Astros	Rookie of the Year	Yuli Gurriel	
Lou Gehrig Memorial Award		Jose Altuve	
Silver Slugger Award	Second baseman	Jose Altuve	
Silver Slugger Award	Outfielder	George Springer	
The Sporting News Major League Player of the Year		Jose Altuve	
Sports Illustrated	Hope Award	Carlos Beltrán	
Sports Illustrated	Sportsperson of the Year	Jose Altuve	
World Series Most Valuable Player (WS MVP)		George Springer	

Other awards results

Name of award	Voting recipient(s) (Team)	Ref.
AL Cy Young	1st—Kluber (CLE) • 5th—Verlander (DET/HOU)	
AL Manager of the Year	1st—Molitor (MIN) • 3rd—Hinch (HOU)	
AL Most Valuable Player	1st—Altuve (HOU) • 13th—Springer (HOU); Other Astros:17th—Correa • 19th—González	
AL Rookie of the Year	1st—Judge (NYY) • 4th—Gurriel (HOU)	
Heart & Hustle	Winner—Gardner (NYY) • Nominee—Reddick (HOU)	
Roberto Clemente	Winner—Rizzo (CHC) • Nominee—Altuve (HOU)	

=== League leaders ===
American League leaders
Category	Player	Total
Batting champion	Jose Altuve	.346^{†}
Hits leader	Jose Altuve	204
Power–speed number	Jose Altuve	27.4^{†}
Sacrifice flies	Josh Reddick	12^{†}
Singles	Jose Altuve	137
Wins Above Replacement—all	Jose Altuve	8.3^{†}
Wins Above Replacement—offense	Jose Altuve	8.1^{†}
†—Led MLB; Sources:

== Minor league system ==
Level	Team	League	Manager
AAA	Sugar Land Space Cowboys	Pacific Coast League	Mickey Storey
AA	Corpus Christi Hooks	Texas League	Rodney Linares
A-Advanced	Fayetteville Woodpeckers	Carolina League	Carlos Lugo
A	Quad Cities River Bandits	Midwest League	Russ Steinhorn
A-Short Season	Tri-City ValleyCats	New York–Penn League	Morgan Ensberg
Rookie	Greeneville Astros	Appalachian League	Danny Ortega
Rookie	GCL Astros	Gulf Coast League	Wladimir Sutil
Rookie	DSL Astros	Dominican Summer League	

Awards

- All-Star Futures Game
  - Yordan Alvarez
  - Kyle Tucker
- Joe Bauman Home Run Award: A. J. Reed
- Triple-A All-Star Team—Outfielder: Derek Fisher

== Illegal electronic sign stealing and punishment ==
Two years later in November 2019, allegations were made that the Astros used a sophisticated electronic sign stealing system. The Athletic published a report which stated that Mike Fiers, who left the Astros after 2017 and later played for the Detroit Tigers and Oakland Athletics, warned his new teams about the practice. The Athletic article heavily stressed that the illegal sign stealing was hardly exclusive to the Astros, but was in fact rampant across Major League Baseball. An MLB investigation into the allegations was launched following the report. Baseball YouTuber Jomboy Media was also one of the first to bring this to public attention, adding that a banging sound could be heard before each pitch. The number of bangs indicated to Astros batters what pitches were expected to be thrown from opposing pitchers.

Emails reveal that Astros management asked their employees who were scouting upcoming opponents: “One thing in specific we are looking for is picking up signs coming out of the dugout, . . . if we need cameras/binoculars, etc . . . ” The Athletic stated that MLB rules allow binoculars (but not to relay signs the same game), but do not seem to allow cameras.

On January 13, 2020, Major League Baseball handed down punishments for the Astros ballclub in reference to the sign stealing allegations. Both general manager Jeff Luhnow and manager A. J. Hinch were suspended for the entirety of the 2020 season, and the club was fined $5 million and forced to forfeit first and second round draft picks of the 2020 and 2021 drafts. This punishment is a record for such an infringement. The $5 million fine is the highest allowed by the MLB Constitution. As a consequence of MLB's announcement, Luhnow and Hinch were promptly fired by Astros' owner Jim Crane the same day.

== See also ==
- List of baseball players who are Olympic gold medalists and World Series champions
- List of Major League Baseball 100 win seasons
- List of Major League Baseball batting champions
- List of Major League Baseball franchise postseason streaks
- List of Major League Baseball game sevens
- List of Major League Baseball league leaders in hits 3 or more consecutive seasons
- List of Major League Baseball titles leaders
- List of neutral site regular season Major League Baseball games played in the United States and Canada
