= Carlos Lugo =

Carlos Lugo may refer to:

- Carlos Lugo (Paraguayan footballer) (born 1976), Paraguayan football defender
- Carlos Lugo (baseball) (born 1985), baseball shortstop
- Carlos Lugo (Colombian footballer) (born 1953), Colombian former footballer
- Carlos José Lugo, baseball analyst in the Dominican Republic
- Carlos Lugo (Mexican footballer) (born 1993), Mexican footballer
