= Reymin Guduan =

Dominican baseball player (born 1992)

Reymín Guduán
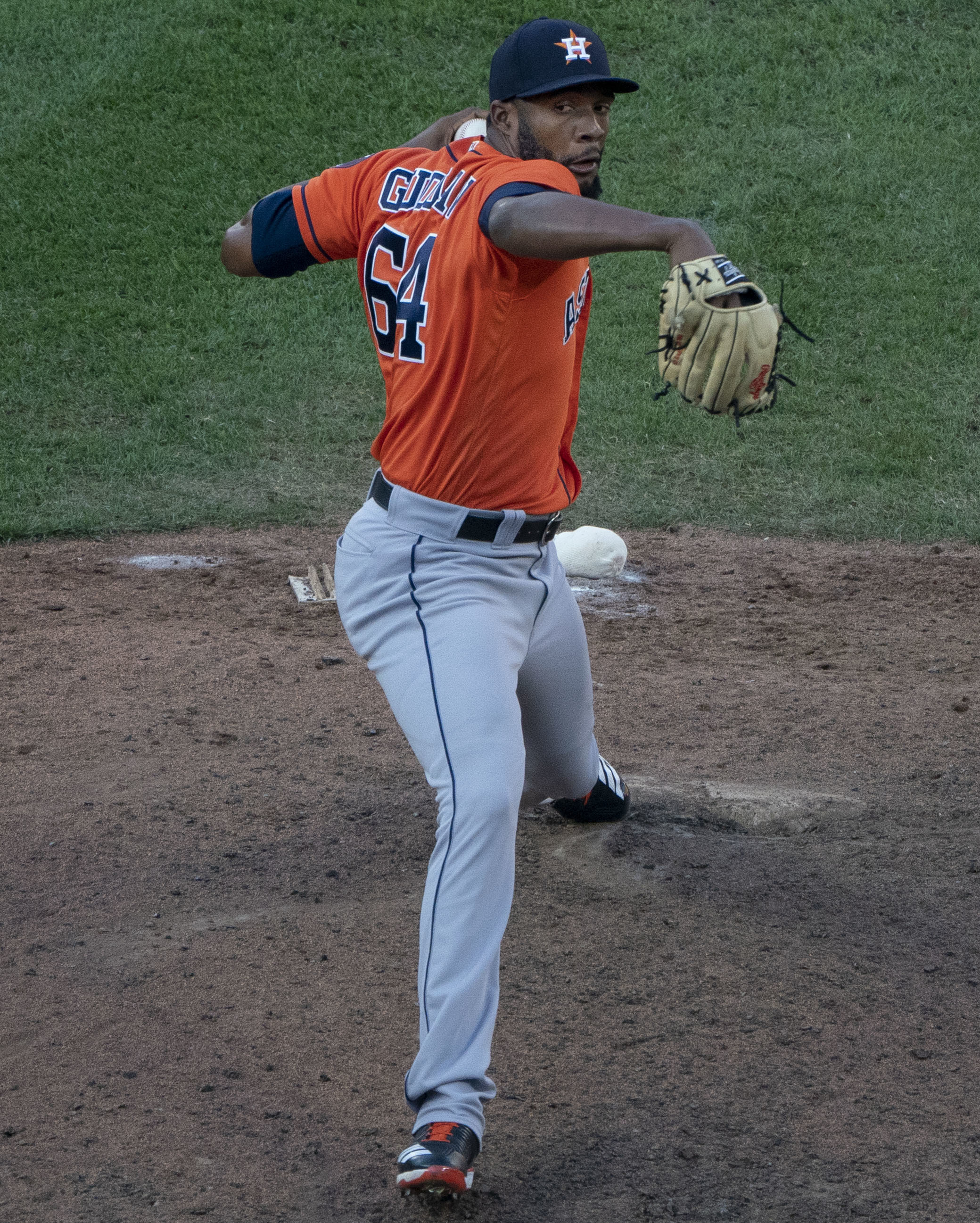
- Guduan with the Houston Astros

Charros de Jalisco – No. 89
- Pitcher
- Born: March 16, 1992 (age 34); San Pedro de Macorís, Dominican Republic
- Bats: Left Throws: Left

Professional debut
- MLB: May 31, 2017, for the Houston Astros
- CPBL: April 3, 2024, for the TSG Hawks

MLB statistics (through 2021 season)
- Win–loss record: 1–0
- Earned run average: 7.38
- Strikeouts: 31

CPBL statistics (through 2024 season)
- Win–loss record: 0–2
- Earned run average: 5.58
- Strikeouts: 28
- Stats at Baseball Reference

Teams
- Houston Astros (2017–2019); Oakland Athletics (2021); TSG Hawks (2024)

Reymín Yojairo Guduán (born March 16, 1992) is a Dominican professional baseball pitcher for the Charros de Jalisco of the Mexican League. He has previously played in Major League Baseball (MLB) for the Houston Astros and Oakland Athletics, and in the Chinese Professional Baseball League (CPBL) for the TSG Hawks.

== Career ==
=== Houston Astros ===
Guduan signed with the Houston Astros as an international free agent on May 29, 2010. He made his professional debut in 2010 with the Dominican Summer League Astros. He remained with the DSL Astros in 2011, recording a 1–3 record and 2.17 ERA in 13 appearances. In 2012, he played for the GCL Astros, registering a 1–1 record and 5.40 ERA. The next year, he split the season between the GCL Astros and the Triple-A Oklahoma City RedHawks, logging a 4.30 ERA with 32 strikeouts in 23.0 innings of work. In 2014, Guduan played for the rookie ball Greeneville Astros, posting a 2–5 record and 4.47 ERA in 13 games. He split the 2015 season between the Single-A Quad Cities River Bandits, the High-A Lancaster JetHawks, and the Double-A Corpus Christi Hooks, accumulating a 4–6 record and 5.52 ERA in 45.2 innings pitched between the three teams. He split the 2016 season between the Triple-A Fresno Grizzlies and Corpus Christi, pitching to a cumulative 3–3 record a 4.18 ERA in 43 appearances.

The Astros added him to their 40-man roster after the 2016 season. Guduan started 2017 with the Fresno Grizzlies, and was called up to the Astros on May 31, making his MLB debut the same day. In his debut against the Minnesota Twins, Guduan pitched two innings in relief, allowing one run on two hits, along with two strikeouts and walks. He appeared in 22 games for the Astros, but had a 7.88 ERA to finish 2017. The Astros had a 101–61 record in 2017, and eventually won the 2017 World Series. Guduan won his first championship, despite not playing in the playoffs.

He spent the majority of the 2018 season in Fresno, logging a 3–3 record and 3.74 ERA in 43 appearances for Fresno, and also pitched 3.1 innings of 1-run ball for the Astros. He split the 2019 season between Houston and the Triple-A Round Rock Express, and struggled to an 11.81 ERA in 7 games for the big league club. On August 4, 2019, Guduan was suspended for the remainder of that season by the Astros for non-specified, “violations of team policy”. On September 3, Guduan was activated from the restricted list and designated for assignment. On September 7, he cleared waivers and was released by the Astros.

=== Los Angeles Dodgers ===
On December 6, 2019, Guduan signed a minor league contract with the Los Angeles Dodgers. Guduan did not play in a game in 2020 due to the cancellation of the minor league season because of the COVID-19 pandemic. He became a free agent on November 2, 2020.

=== Oakland Athletics ===
On December 14, 2020, Guduan signed a minor league contract with the Oakland Athletics organization. On April 1, 2021, Guduan was selected to the 40-man roster. He was placed on the injured list on May 28 with a strained right groin. When he was activated on June 8, he was promptly designated for assignment. In 11 appearances for Oakland, he had struggled to a 6.28 ERA in 11 appearances. He was outrighted to the Triple-A Las Vegas Aviators on June 10.

=== Leones de Yucatán ===
On April 14, 2022, Guduan signed with the Leones de Yucatán of the Mexican League. In 31 relief appearances, he posted a 1–3 record with a 3.90 ERA and 33 strikeouts over 27.2 innings. Guduan was released on July 14, 2022.

=== Toros de Tijuana ===
On August 1, 2022, Guduan signed with the Toros de Tijuana of the Mexican League. He made 2 appearances for Tijuana, posting a 4.50 ERA with one strikeout in 2.0 innings of work. Guduan was released by the team on January 19, 2023.

=== Tri-City ValleyCats ===
On May 5, 2023, Guduan signed with the Tri-City ValleyCats of the Frontier League. In 21 games for the ValleyCats, he registered a 2.25 ERA with 44 strikeouts and 4 saves across 24 innings of work.

=== TSG Hawks ===
On November 30, 2023, Guduan signed with the Piratas de Campeche of the Mexican League. However, on January 26, 2024, Guduan signed with the TSG Hawks of the Chinese Professional Baseball League. In 31 appearances out of the bullpen for TSG, he compiled a 5.58 ERA with 28 strikeouts and 10 saves across 30 2/3 innings pitched. Guduan was released by the Hawks on August 19.

=== Conspiradores de Querétaro ===
On April 14, 2025, Guduan signed with the Conspiradores de Querétaro of the Mexican League. In 50 relief appearances, he posted a 7–1 record with a 5.70 ERA, 38 strikeouts, and 24 walks across 47 1/3 innings pitched.

Guduan made 15 relief appearances for Querétaro in 2026, going 2–1 with a 3.63 ERA, 15 strikeouts, and nine walks in 17 1/3 innings.

=== Charros de Jalisco ===
On June 8, 2026, Guduan was traded to the Charros de Jalisco of the Mexican League in exchange for Stephen Gonsalves and Aaron McGarity.
