= Jordan Jankowski =

American baseball player (born 1989)

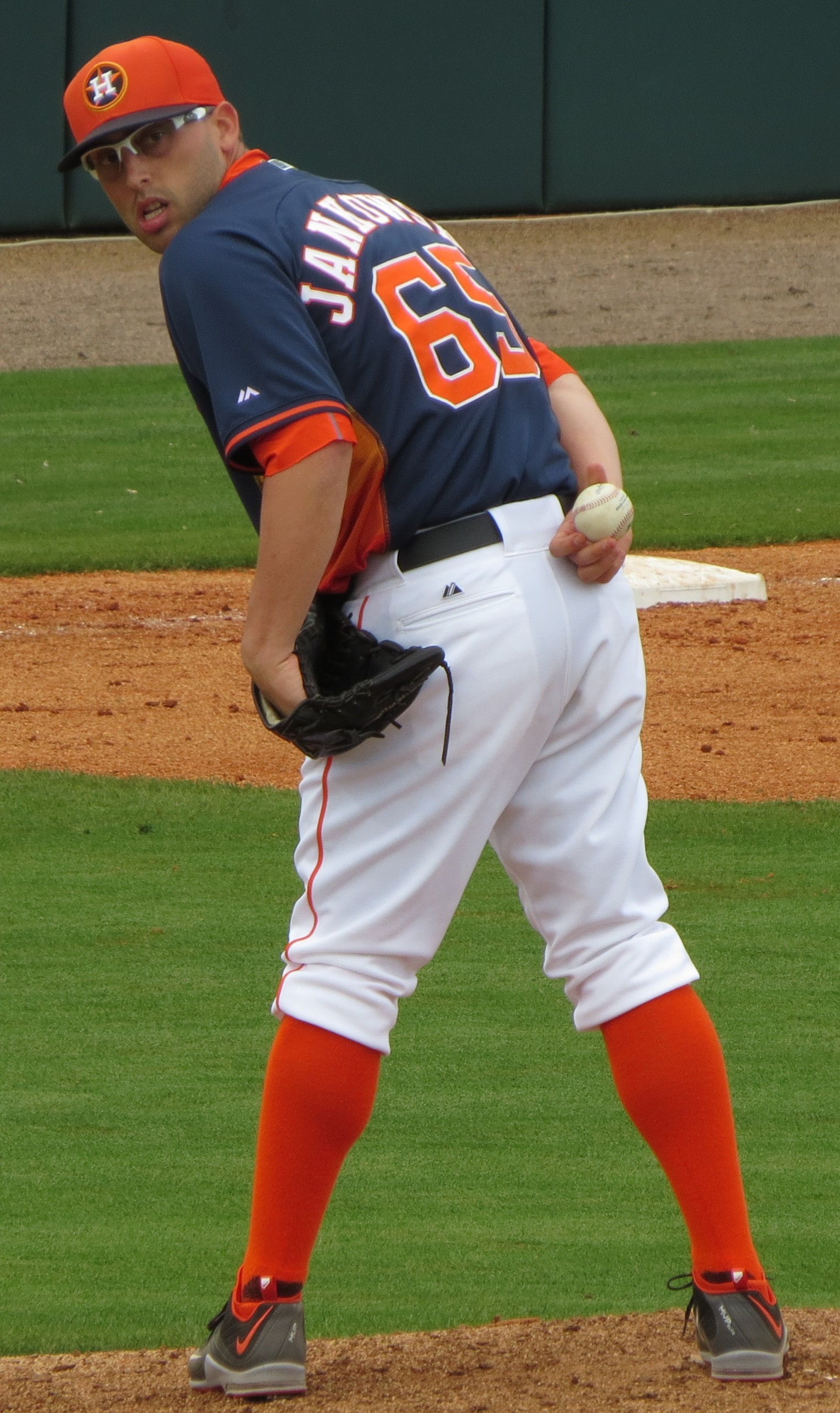
- Jankowski pitching for the Houston Astros in 2015 Spring Training
- Pitcher
- Born: May 17, 1989 (age 37); McMurray, Pennsylvania, U.S.
- Batted: Right Threw: Right

MLB debut
- May 24, 2017, for the Houston Astros

Last MLB appearance
- August 2, 2017, for the Houston Astros

MLB statistics
- Win–loss record: 1–0
- Earned run average: 12.46
- Strikeouts: 5
- Stats at Baseball Reference

Teams
- Houston Astros (2017)

Jordan Jacob Jankowski (born May 17, 1989) is an American former professional baseball pitcher. He played in Major League Baseball (MLB) for the Houston Astros.

== Career ==
=== Houston Astros ===
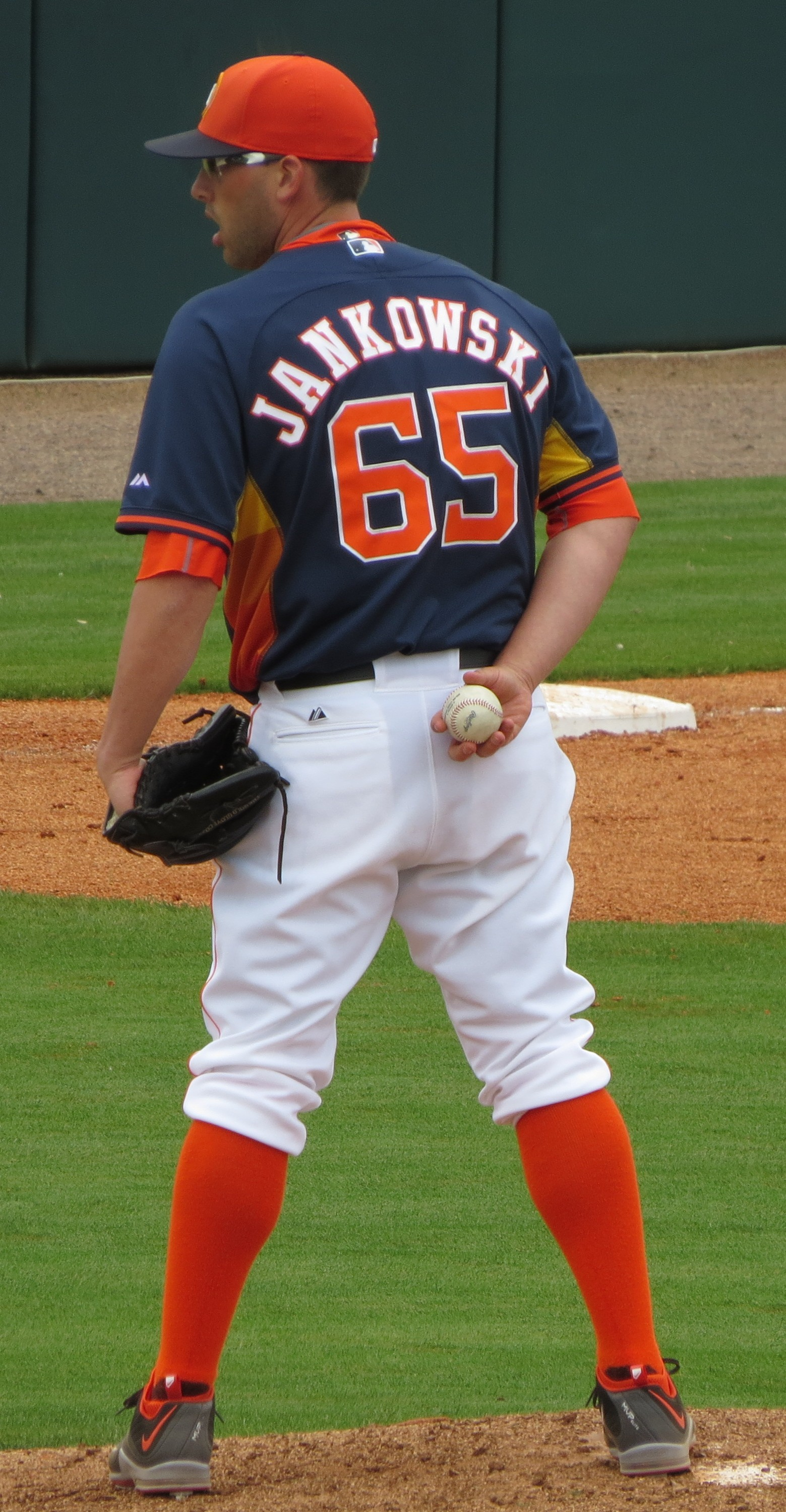
Jankowski pitching for the Houston Astros in 2015 Spring Training

Jankowski was drafted twice by the Houston Astros, in the 34th round of the 2008 MLB draft from Peters Township High School and again in the 34th round of the 2012 MLB draft out of Catawba College. He signed on June 12, 2012. Jankowski began his professional career with the rookie league Greeneville Astros in 2012 and then played in Single-A with the Quad Cities River Bandits and Lancaster JetHawks in 2013. He spent all of 2014 with the Corpus Christi Hooks of the Texas League and spent 2015 and 2016 with the Fresno Grizzlies of the Triple-A Pacific Coast League.

After beginning the 2017 season back in Fresno, Jankowski was called up to the majors for the first time on May 22, 2017. He made his MLB debut for the Astros on May 24 against the Detroit Tigers, allowing two runs in one inning of work. In his second appearance, on May 29 against the Minnesota Twins, Jankowski allowed four runs in 2 1/3 innings but was credited with his first win. On August 2, he made a third appearance, pitching a scoreless inning against the Tampa Bay Rays.

=== Los Angeles Dodgers ===
On August 20, 2017, Jankowski was claimed off waivers by the Los Angeles Dodgers. He was designated for assignment on September 2 after just a few games with the Triple-A Oklahoma City Dodgers. Jankowski was released by the Dodgers prior to the 2018 season.

=== Los Angeles Angels ===
On April 9, 2018, Jankowski signed a minor league contract with the Los Angeles Angels. He was released on May 25.

=== Steel City Slammin' Sammies ===
In 2020, Jankowski signed with the Steel City Slammin' Sammies of the Washington League. In 3 games for the team, he struggled to an 0-1 record and 6.75 ERA with 4 strikeouts, 6 walks, and a saves.
