= Francis Martes =

Dominican baseball player (born 1995)

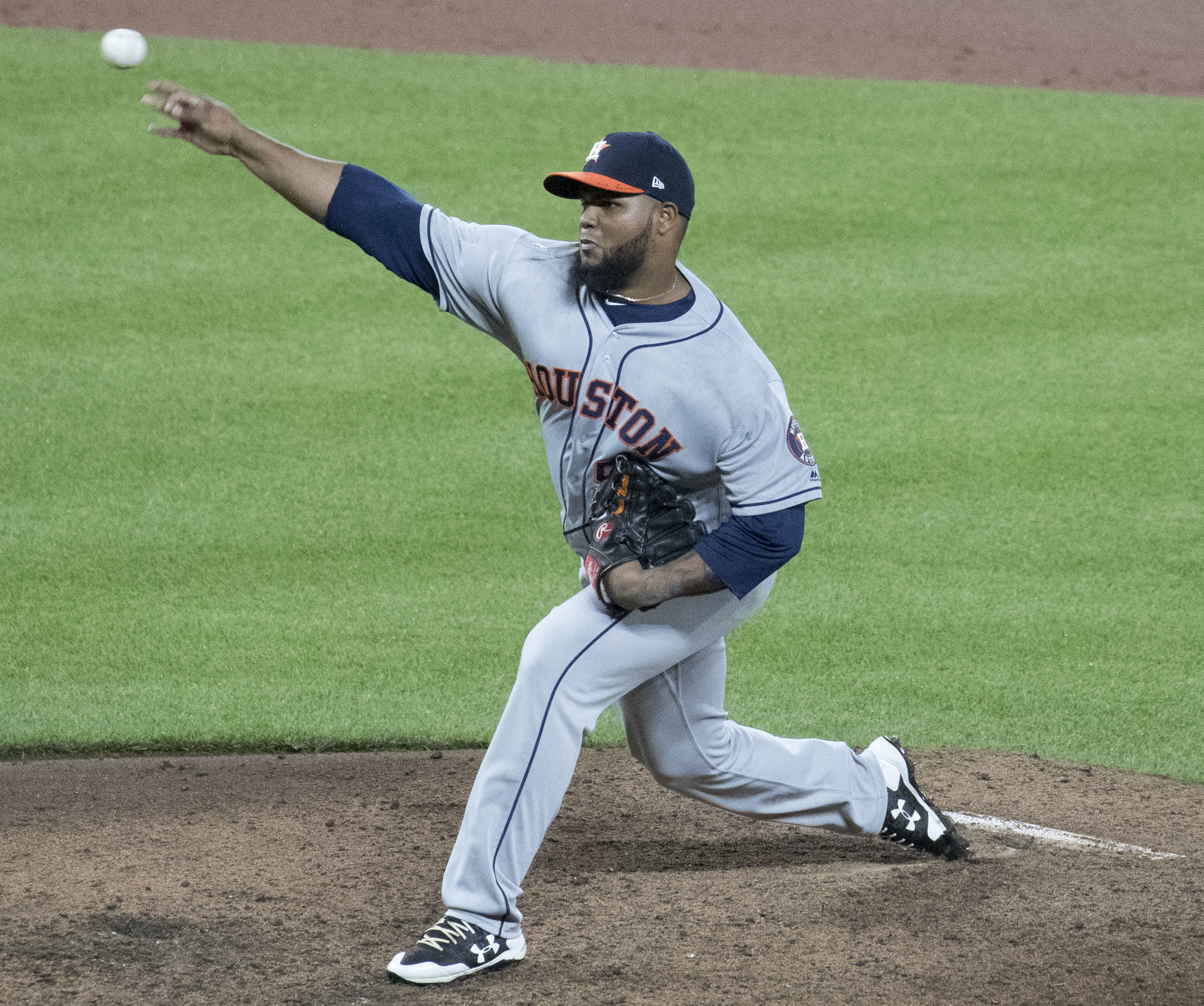
- Martes with the Houston Astros
- Pitcher
- Born: November 24, 1995 (age 30); Santo Domingo, Dominican Republic
- Batted: Right Threw: Right

MLB debut
- June 9, 2017, for the Houston Astros

Last MLB appearance
- October 1, 2017, for the Houston Astros

MLB statistics
- Win–loss record: 5–2
- Earned run average: 5.80
- Strikeouts: 69
- Stats at Baseball Reference

Teams
- Houston Astros (2017)

Francis Euclides Martes Suazo (born November 24, 1995) is a Dominican former professional baseball pitcher. Martes was signed by the Miami Marlins as an international free agent in 2012. He made his Major League Baseball (MLB) debut in 2017 with the Houston Astros.

== Career ==
=== Miami Marlins ===
Martes was signed by the Miami Marlins as an international free agent in November 2012. He made his professional debut in 2013 with the Dominican Summer League Marlins, logging a 3–3 record and 3.04 ERA in 12 appearances. He began the 2014 season with the GCL Marlins, posting a 2–2 record and 5.18 ERA in 8 games.

=== Houston Astros ===
On July 31, 2014, Martes along with Colin Moran and Jake Marisnick were traded from the Marlins to the Houston Astros for Jarred Cosart, Enrique Hernández and Austin Wates. Martes started 2015 with the Quad Cities River Bandits. He was later that season promoted to the Lancaster JetHawks and Double-A Corpus Christi Hooks. He returned to Corpus Christi in 2016 and after the season played in the Arizona Fall League. The Astros invited Martes to spring training as a non-roster player in 2017. Martes began the 2017 season with the Fresno Grizzlies of the Class AAA Pacific Coast League.

The Astros promoted Martes to the MLB for the first time on June 8, 2017. He made his MLB debut the next day. In 32 appearances (4 starts) of 2017, Martes had a 5–2 record and a 5.80 ERA. He returned to Fresno in 2018. On August 15, 2018, Martes underwent Tommy John surgery. On March 12, 2019, Martes was suspended for 80 games for using clomiphene in a violation of the MLB Joint Drug Prevention & Treatment program. On February 17, 2020, Martes was suspended for 162 games for another violation of the MLB Joint Drug Prevention & Treatment program, this time for using boldenone.

On June 19, 2021, Martes was activated off of the restricted list and optioned to the Triple-A Sugar Land Skeeters. After struggling to an 0–3 record and 10.80 ERA in 7 appearances with Sugar Land, Martes was designated for assignment by Houston on June 30. He was outrighted to Sugar Land on July 4. He was released on August 17, 2021.

=== Mexican League ===
On April 18, 2022, Martes signed with the Diablos Rojos del México of the Mexican League. In 10 starts, he went 3–1 with a 6.33 ERA and 57 strikeouts in 42 2/3 innings. Martes was waived on June 29, 2022. On June 30, 2022, Martes was claimed off waivers by the Guerreros de Oaxaca. In 6 starts, he posted a 2–1 record with a 7.45 ERA and 32 strikeouts in 29 innings. On December 29, 2022, Martes was traded to the Toros de Tijuana in exchange for Fernando Rodney. On April 18, 2023, his rights were traded to the Bravos de León. In 2 starts, he registered a 0–2 record with a 10.24 ERA over 9 2/3 innings. Martes was released on April 29, 2023.

== See also ==
- List of Major League Baseball players suspended for performance-enhancing drugs
