= Dayan Díaz =

Colombian baseball player (born 1989)

- Pitcher
- Born: February 10, 1989 (age 37); Cartagena, Colombia
- Batted: Right Threw: Right

MLB debut
- May 22, 2016, for the Cincinnati Reds

Last MLB appearance
- July 6, 2017, for the Houston Astros

MLB statistics
- Win–loss record: 1–1
- Earned run average: 9.15
- Strikeouts: 23
- Stats at Baseball Reference

Teams
- Cincinnati Reds (2016); Houston Astros (2017)

Dayan Enrique Díaz (born February 10, 1989) is a Colombian former professional baseball pitcher. He played in Major League Baseball (MLB) for the Cincinnati Reds and Houston Astros.

== Career ==
=== Houston Astros ===
Díaz signed with the Houston Astros as an international free agent in 2005, and spent his first three professional seasons with the Venezuelan Summer League Astros. He underwent Tommy John surgery in 2009 and missed the entirety of the season as a result.

Díaz returned to action in 2010, making 2 appearances for the rookie–level Gulf Coast League Astros. He spent 2011 with the Low–A Tri-City ValleyCats, posting a 7–3 record and 1.98 ERA with 70 strikeouts across 50 innings pitched. Díaz spent the 2012 campaign with the Single–A Lexington Legends, registering a 5–4 record and 1.85 ERA with 64 strikeouts and 19 saves. He elected free agency following the season on November 2, 2012.

=== Chicago Cubs ===
On December 31, 2012, Díaz signed a minor league contract with the Chicago Cubs. In 13 appearances split between the rookie–level Arizona League Cubs, High–A Daytona Cubs, and Double–A Tennessee Smokies, he compiled a 3.00 ERA with 29 strikeouts over 21 innings pitched. Díaz was released by the Cubs organization on August 24, 2013.

=== Boston Red Sox ===
On December 5, 2013, Díaz signed a minor league contract with the Boston Red Sox organization. He split 2014 between the High–A Salem Red Sox and Double–A Portland Sea Dogs, posting a combined 1.80 ERA with 56 strikeouts and 7 saves across 50 innings.

Díaz split the 2015 season between Portland and the Triple–A Pawtucket Red Sox, compiling a 1.73 ERA with 66 strikeouts and 6 saves over 37 appearances out of the bullpen. He elected free agency following the season on November 6, 2015.

=== Cincinnati Reds ===
On November 25, 2015, Díaz signed a minor league contract with the Cincinnati Reds organization. On May 22, 2016, Díaz was selected to the 40-man roster and promoted to the major leagues for the first time. In 6 appearances for Cincinnati, he struggled to a 9.45 ERA with 3 strikeouts across 6 2/3 innings. On June 18, Díaz was removed from the 40–man roster and sent outright to the Triple–A Louisville Bats. He elected free agency following the season on November 7.

=== Houston Astros (second stint) ===
Díaz signed a minor league contract with the Houston Astros on January 21, 2017. On May 5, he was promoted to the major leagues to replace Michael Feliz, who went on Family Medical Emergency leave. Díaz was designated for assignment on August 31.

=== Los Angeles Angels ===
On September 4, 2017, Díaz was claimed off waivers by the Los Angeles Angels. On March 29, 2018, the Angels placed Díaz on the restricted list after he failed to report for spring training due to visa issues. On August 14, he was designated for assignment following the acquisition of Odrisamer Despaigne. Díaz elected free agency on October 11.
