= Carlos José Lugo =

Baseball analyst in the Dominican Republic

Carlos Jose Lugo is a baseball analyst in the Dominican Republic. Carlos Jose has more than 17 years of broadcasting experience in radio, television and print media. He is a field reporter for ESPN Deportes' telecasts of the Dominican Baseball League. Lugo launched his broadcasting career in 1987 as an MLB analyst on Radio Dial in San Pedro de Macoris, Dominican Republic. He is a familiar voice on radio, known for his work as a sports commentator and MLB analyst for FM-103, Radio Continental and Radio Clarin, and Rumba FM (98.5).

== Broadcast ==
On the Dominican baseball market, Carlos Jose started his TV career as a baseball analyst for the Estrellas Orientales telecast and has been doing the same duties for Tigres del Licey since 2006.

For the international markets, Carlos has been an analyst on Fox Sports En Espanol in the late 1990s and has been the field reporter for ESPN Deportes telecast since 2005. His professionalism and impartial analysis has made him a fan favorite.

== Printed media and internet ==
Carlos Jose's writings have been seen in Los Ultimos Innings, a baseball blog with in depth analysis of MLB and Dominican Winter League Baseball. He is also a contributor for the sports pages of Listin Diario.
