= David Paulino =

Dominican baseball player (born 1994)

- Pitcher
- Born: February 6, 1994 (age 32); Nizao, Peravia, Dominican Republic
- Batted: Right Threw: Right

MLB debut
- September 8, 2016, for the Houston Astros

Last MLB appearance
- August 13, 2021, for the Philadelphia Phillies

MLB statistics
- Win–loss record: 3–1
- Earned run average: 5.64
- Strikeouts: 42
- Stats at Baseball Reference

Teams
- Houston Astros (2016–2017); Toronto Blue Jays (2018); Philadelphia Phillies (2021)

David Confesor Paulino (born February 6, 1994) is a Dominican former professional baseball pitcher. He played in Major League Baseball (MLB) for the Houston Astros, Toronto Blue Jays, and Philadelphia Phillies.

== Career ==
=== Detroit Tigers ===
Paulino was signed by the Detroit Tigers as an international free agent in 2010. He made his professional debut in 2011 with the Dominican Summer League Tigers and spent 2012 and 2013 with the Gulf Coast Tigers. In 2013, he underwent Tommy John surgery which caused him to miss the 2014 season.

=== Houston Astros ===
On September 13, 2013, Paulino was acquired by the Houston Astros as a player to be named later in an earlier trade for José Veras. Paulino made his debut in the Astros organization in 2015 with the Tri-City ValleyCats and also played for the Quad Cities River Bandits and Lancaster JetHawks. The Astros added him to their 40-man roster after the season. Paulino was promoted to the major leagues on September 6, 2016.

On July 1, 2017, Paulino was suspended 80 games without pay for testing positive for a performance-enhancing substance. From that point on, he would not play again for the rest of 2017, but finished with a 2–0 record and a 6.52 ERA in six starts.

=== Toronto Blue Jays ===
On July 30, 2018, the Astros traded Paulino, Ken Giles, and Héctor Pérez to the Toronto Blue Jays for Roberto Osuna. The Blue Jays activated Paulino from the disabled list on September 5. Paulino was designated for assignment on August 7, 2019. He was released on August 10.

=== Philadelphia Phillies ===
On January 18, 2021, Paulino signed a minor league contract with the Philadelphia Phillies organization and was invited to spring training. He was assigned to the Triple-A Lehigh Valley IronPigs to start the season. After posting a 4.35 ERA with 58 strikeouts in 25 appearances with Triple-A Lehigh Valley, Paulino's contract was selected by the Phillies. He made his Phillies debut on August 13, pitching 2 innings and giving up 2 runs. The following day, Paulino was designated for assignment by Philadelphia. He cleared waivers and was sent outright to Lehigh Valley on August 16. Paulino elected free agency following the season on November 7.

== See also ==
- List of Major League Baseball players suspended for performance-enhancing drugs
