= Carlos Alvarez (baseball) =

Dominican baseball player, fraudster (born 1985)

Carlos David Alvarez Lugo (born November 25, 1985) is a Dominican former shortstop in the Washington Nationals organization. He was known as Esmailyn Gonzalez until February 2009, when Sports Illustrated published an investigation that proved he had used fraudulent documents making him four younger than his true age.

== Signing ==
On July 2, 2006, the Nationals signed 20-year-old Alvarez, then known as 16-year-old Esmailyn Gonzalez, as an international free agent. He was given a US$1.4 million (equivalent to $2.24 million in 2025) signing bonus. The Nationals were given information that Alvarez was born on September 21, 1989, a date which the MLB office confirmed for at least three interested teams, including Washington. He made his debut for the Gulf Coast League Nationals, playing in a summer rookie league (lower than the Class A minor leagues) in 2007.

== Name/birth date controversy ==
Soon after the player was signed by the Nationals, team officials asked MLB to do some further checking in response to concerns about irregularities in his signing. MLB initially determined there was nothing out of the ordinary.

However, on February 17, 2009, Sports Illustrated uncovered evidence that Gonzalez's real name was Carlos Alvarez Daniel Lugo, and he was born in 1985 rather than 1989. Even before then, a number of baseball insiders suspected that Gonzalez/Alvarez was significantly less than advertised. One of them told SI that despite the Nationals billing him as a five-tool player, "he doesn't run all that well, and has an average arm."

In a press conference later that day, Nationals president Stan Kasten confirmed that Gonzalez's real name was indeed Carlos Alvarez. A visibly angry Kasten said the Nationals had been victimized by "a deliberate, premeditated fraud" involving several people and a raft of falsified records. He added that he'd asked for a further inquiry in response to revelations that Chicago White Sox officials were skimming off the signing bonuses of Latino prospects. He vowed the Nationals would seek legal and financial recourse.

The Federal Bureau of Investigation soon began investigating Nationals general manager Jim Bowden, suspecting that he has skimmed bonus money from international signees since 1994, when he was with the Cincinnati Reds. Bowden was subsequently forced to resign as a result of the affair, though nothing ever came of that investigation.

With the news of Alvarez's real name and age, and his on field performance, he was far less valuable as a potential MLB player. Although he won the Gulf Coast League batting title in 2008 and compiled fairly good numbers in runs, RBIs and hits, one scout said that these numbers were to be expected considering that he was somewhat older than the other players in that summer rookie league (lower than the Class A minor leagues).

Despite the fraud, Alvarez continued to play in the Nationals minor league system through 2013. However, he never rose higher than Class A. He played for Tigres del Licey in the Dominican Professional Baseball League in 2014–15, and has not returned to baseball at any level since then.
