= History of the Atlanta Braves =

This article details the History of the Atlanta Braves, which concerns the evolution of the Major League Baseball team Atlanta Braves over time.

The Braves played in Boston from their inception in 1871 until 1953, when owner Lou Perini relocated the franchise to Milwaukee, Wisconsin. During the franchise's 13-year tenure in Milwaukee, aided by Hall of Famers Warren Spahn, Eddie Mathews, and Hank Aaron, the Braves reached the World Series in 1957 and 1958, winning in the former year. They also finished second in the National League five times from 1953 to 1960. In the early-to-mid-1960s, however, the Braves failed to play World Series-caliber baseball, and in 1962, Perini sold the team to William Bartholomay, who relocated the team to Atlanta, Georgia, in 1966.

With the exceptions of National League West division titles in 1969 and 1982, the Braves were a largely mediocre team from the late 1960s through the 1980s. In 1976, media magnate Ted Turner purchased the Braves from Bartholomay and pledged to keep the team in Atlanta. The team's fortunes had an abrupt turnaround in 1991, when they became the first team in National League history to reach the World Series one year after finishing last. 1991 was the start of 14 consecutive division titles for the Braves, who became known as the "Team of the 90s". During that decade they played in five World Series (1991, 1992, 1995, 1996, and 1999) and won one (1995), which made them the only team in Major League history to win the World Series three times in three different cities. Their success relied heavily on a legendary starting rotation which included Hall of Famers John Smoltz, Tom Glavine, and Greg Maddux.

In 2006, the Braves' streak of division titles ended and they trudged through four years of mediocrity before earning three postseason berths between 2010 and 2013. The team then had four consecutive losing seasons before beginning a new streak of NL East division titles in 2018. In 2021, the Braves won their fourth World Series title.

== Milwaukee years ==
After leaving Boston, the city of Milwaukee went wild over the Braves, who were welcomed as genuine heroes. The success of the team after the move was noted by many owners. Not coincidentally, the Philadelphia Athletics, St. Louis Browns, Brooklyn Dodgers, and New York Giants all relocated over the next five years.

The team drew over 2.2 million at home during the regular season, then went on to its first World Series win in over 40 years, defeating the New York Yankees.

=== The move to Atlanta ===
After the period of success was over, Lou Perini sold the Braves to a Chicago-based group led by William Bartholomay after the 1962 season. The ink had barely dried on the deal when Bartholomay started shopping the Braves to a larger television market. At the same time, the fast-growing city of Atlanta, led by Mayor Ivan Allen, Jr., constructed a new $18 million, 52,007–60,606 seat multi-purpose stadium in less than one year, Atlanta Stadium (later on known as Atlanta–Fulton County Stadium from 1976 until 1996 with its demolition in 1997), which was officially opened in 1965 in hopes of luring an existing major league and/or NFL/AFL team.

After the city failed to lure the Kansas City A's (who moved to Oakland in 1968), Allen courted the Braves, who announced their intention to move to Atlanta for the 1965 season. However, an injunction filed in Wisconsin forced the Braves to play a lame-duck season in Milwaukee, but the home attendance was less than 560,000. In the interim, Atlanta Stadium played host to the Braves' new Triple-A affiliate, the Atlanta Crackers of the International League. The Braves had bought the Crackers in order to secure the major-league rights to the Atlanta area; in those days, the owner of a minor-league team also owned the major league rights to that city.

The Braves completed the move to Atlanta prior to the 1966 season, and drew over 1.5 million in the new stadium that first year. Before that season, they moved the Crackers to Richmond, Virginia as the Richmond Braves.

== Atlanta ==
=== 1966–1975: Early years in Atlanta ===
The Braves were a .500 team in their first few years in Atlanta – 85–77 in 1966, 77–85 in 1967, and 81–81 in 1968. The 1967 season was the club's first losing campaign since 1952, its last year in Boston. In 1969, with the onset of divisional play, the Braves won the first-ever National League West pennant, but were swept in three games by the "Miracle Mets" in the inaugural National League Championship Series. Atlanta would not be a factor in the division in the next decade, posting only two winning seasons between 1970 and 1981 – in some cases fielding squads as bad as the worst Boston teams.

In the meantime, fans had to be satisfied with the achievements of Hank Aaron, who actually increased his offensive production in the relatively hitter-friendly confines of Atlanta Stadium (nicknamed "The Launching Pad"). By the end of the 1973 season, Aaron had hit 713 home runs, one short of Babe Ruth's career home run record. Throughout the winter he received racially motivated death threats, but stood up well under the pressure. The next season, it was only a matter of time before he set a new record. On April 4, he hit #714 in Cincinnati, and on April 8, in front of his home fans, he finally beat Ruth's mark, smashing #715 off Al Downing of the Los Angeles Dodgers. Aaron would eventually hit 755 home runs for his career (the major league record until 2007), with all but 22 coming in a Braves uniform. The team also produced batting champions in Rico Carty (in 1970) and Ralph Garr (in 1974) during this time period.

=== 1976–1989: Ted Turner buys the Braves ===
In 1976, media magnate Ted Turner, owner of superstation WTCG (later known as WTBS, now known as WPCH-TV), purchased the Braves as a means of keeping the team (and one of his main programming staples) in Atlanta. The financially strapped Turner used money already paid to the team for their broadcast rights as a down payment. Turner used the Braves as a major programming draw for his fledgling cable channel, a move that made the team one of the first Major League Baseball franchises to have a regular, nationwide audience and fanbase, along with the Chicago Cubs (who were also distributed nationally via another superstation, WGN). WTCG marketed the Braves as "America's Team", a nickname that still sticks in some areas of the country, especially the South, today.

Turner quickly gained a reputation as a quirky, hands-on baseball owner. Among other things, in 1976 he suggested the nickname "Channel" for his new free agent acquisition, pitcher Andy Messersmith, along with jersey number 17, in order to indirectly promote WTCG (which broadcast on Channel 17 in the local Atlanta market). Major League Baseball quickly vetoed the idea. On May 11, 1977, Turner appointed himself manager, but because MLB passed a rule in the 1950s barring managers from holding a financial stake in their team, he was ordered to relinquish that position after one game (the Braves lost 2–1 to the Pittsburgh Pirates to bring their losing streak to 17 games).

After three straight losing seasons, Bobby Cox was hired for his first stint as manager for the 1978 season, and he promoted a 22-year-old slugger named Dale Murphy into the starting lineup. Murphy hit 77 home runs over the next three seasons, but struggled on defense, positioned at either catcher or first base while being unable to adeptly play either. However, in 1980, Murphy was moved to center field and demonstrated excellent range and throwing ability, while the Braves earned their first winning season since 1974.

Cox was fired after the 1981 season and replaced with Joe Torre, under whose leadership the Braves saw the team win its first 13 games of the season (setting a since-equaled MLB record) and attained their first divisional title since 1969. However, they were swept by the eventual World Series champion St. Louis Cardinals in the NLCS. Strong performances from Bob Horner, Chris Chambliss, pitcher Phil Niekro, and short relief pitcher Gene Garber helped the club, but no Brave was more acclaimed than Murphy, who won both a Most Valuable Player and a Gold Glove award. Murphy also won a Most Valuable Player award the following season. Murphy, excelling in defense, hitting, and running, was consistently recognized as one of the league's best players. However, he was one of the few bright spots during the team's worst stretch since its days in Boston. The Braves averaged only 65 wins per season between 1985 and 1990, bottoming out in 1988 when they lost 106 games, the most in the Atlanta portion of franchise history and their most overall since 1935.

The 1986 season saw the return of Bobby Cox to the Braves organization as general manager. Also in 1986, the team stopped using their Native American-themed mascot, Chief Noc-A-Homa.

=== 1990–2004: Successes and stars ===
==== 1990–1994 ====
Cox returned to the dugout as manager in the middle of the 1990 season, replacing Russ Nixon. The Braves would finish the year with the worst record in baseball, at 65–97, and traded Dale Murphy to the Philadelphia Phillies after it was clear he was becoming a less dominant player. However, pitching coach Leo Mazzone began developing young pitchers Tom Glavine, Steve Avery, and John Smoltz into future stars. That same year, the Braves used the number one overall pick in the 1990 MLB draft to select Chipper Jones, who would go on to become one of the best hitters in team history. Perhaps the Braves' most important move, however, was not on the field, but in the front office. Immediately after the season, John Schuerholz was hired away from the Kansas City Royals as general manager.

The following season, Glavine, Avery, and Smoltz would be recognized as the best young pitchers in the league, winning 52 games among them. Meanwhile, behind position players Dave Justice, Ron Gant and unexpected league Most Valuable Player and batting champion Terry Pendleton, the Braves overcame a 39–40 start, winning 55 of their final 83 games over the last three months of the season and edging the Los Angeles Dodgers by one game. The "Worst to First" Braves, who had not won a divisional title since 1982, captivated the city of Atlanta (and, to a larger degree, the state of Georgia and the entire southeast) during their improbable run to the flag. They defeated the Pittsburgh Pirates in a very tightly contested seven-game NLCS only to lose the World Series, also in seven games, to the Minnesota Twins. The series was the first time a team that had finished last in its division one year went to the World Series the next; both the Twins and Braves accomplished the feat.

During the Braves' rise to prominence in the early 1990s, their long-standing ethnic nickname came under much closer scrutiny, even being protested in Minneapolis when the Braves visited the Twins for Game 1 of the 1991 World Series. The team was especially criticized for selling plastic and foam tomahawks, encouraging the so-called tomahawk chop and the accompanying war cry emitted by the fans. The war cry and tomahawk chop are similar, if not identical, to what Florida State University fans do at their games. Initially, the war chant music was played by the Braves' organist, but in recent years, a recording of the FSU band has been used instead. This tradition can be traced back to the arrival of former Seminole Deion Sanders, who also played for the NFL's Atlanta Falcons at the time (he would go on to play both sports simultaneously in San Francisco for one year).

Despite the World Series loss, the Braves' success would continue. In the 1992 season, the Braves returned to the NLCS and once again defeated the Pirates in seven games, only to lose in the World Series to a dominating Toronto Blue Jays team.

In 1993, the Braves signed Cy Young Award winning pitcher Greg Maddux from the Chicago Cubs, leading many baseball insiders to declare the team's pitching staff the best at that time. The 1993 team posted a franchise-best 104 wins after a dramatic pennant race with the San Francisco Giants, who won 103 games. The Braves needed a stunning 55–19 finish to edge out the Giants, who led the Braves by nine games in the standings as late as August 11. However, the Braves fell in the NLCS to the Philadelphia Phillies in a six-game upset.

In 1994, in a realignment of the National League's divisions following the 1993 expansion, the Braves moved to the Eastern Division. This realignment was the main cause of the team's heated rivalry with the New York Mets during the mid to late 1990s.

The player's strike cut short the 1994 season, prior to the division championships, with the Braves six games behind the Montreal Expos with 48 games left to play.

==== 1995–2004 ====
The Braves returned strong the following strike-shortened (teams played 144 games instead of the customary 162) year and beat the Cleveland Indians in the World Series. This squelched claims by many Braves critics that they were the "Buffalo Bills of baseball" (January 1996 issue of Beckett Baseball Card Monthly). With this World Series victory, the Braves became the first team in Major League Baseball to win world championships in three different cities. With their strong pitching being a constant, the Braves would also appear in the 1996 and 1999 World Series (they lost both series to the New York Yankees, however), and had a streak of division titles from 1991 to 2005 interrupted only in 1994 when the strike ended the season early. Pitching is not the only constant in the Braves organization – Schuerholz remained the team's GM until after the 2007 season when he was promoted to team president. Pendleton did not finish his playing career in Atlanta, but returned to the Braves system as a coach from 2002 to 2017.

A 95–67 record in 2000 produced a ninth consecutive division title. However, a sweep at the hands of the St. Louis Cardinals prevented the Braves from reaching the NLCS. In 2001, Atlanta won the National League East division yet again, swept the NLDS against the Houston Astros, then lost to the Arizona Diamondbacks in the National League Championship Series four games to one. One memorable game the Braves played that year came on September 21, when they played rival New York Mets in the first major professional sporting event held in New York City since 9/11.

In 2002, 2003 and 2004, the Braves won their division again, but lost in the NLDS in all three years; 3 games to 2 to the San Francisco Giants and Chicago Cubs, and 3 games to 1 to the Houston Astros.

==== Cy Young dominance ====
Six National League Cy Young Awards in the 1990s were awarded to three Braves pitchers:

- In 1991, left-handed pitcher Tom Glavine received his first award.
- Right-handed pitcher Greg Maddux won three in a row with the Braves, from 1993 through 1995. His first award came in 1992 with the Cubs.
- In 1996, right-handed pitcher John Smoltz received his only Cy Young Award.
- In 1998, Glavine won his second.

=== 2005: A new generation ===
In 2005, the Braves won the Division championship for the 14th consecutive time since from 1991. The fourteen consecutive division titles (not counting the interrupted 1994 season) stands as the record for all major league baseball. This particular team would be known as the "Baby Braves", referring to the vast presence of rookies on the roster such as Wilson Betemit, Brian McCann, Pete Orr, Ryan Langerhans, and Jeff Francoeur. Catcher Brian McCann, right fielder Jeff Francoeur, and pitcher Kyle Davies all grew up near the Atlanta area; as such, the team had a record of 90–72, two games better than the second place team in the Philadelphia Phillies.

However, the season would end on a sour note as the Braves lost the National League Division Series to the Astros in four games. In Game 4, with the Braves leading by five runs in the eighth inning, the Astros battled back with a Lance Berkman grand slam and a two-out, ninth-inning Brad Ausmus home run off of Braves closer Kyle Farnsworth. The game did not end until the 18th inning, becoming the longest game in playoff history at five hours and fifty minutes. Chris Burke ended the marathon with a home run off of Joey Devine.

After the 2005 season, the Braves lost their long-time pitching coach Leo Mazzone, who left to go to the Baltimore Orioles. Roger McDowell took his place in the Atlanta dugout. Unable to re-sign shortstop Rafael Furcal, the Braves acquired shortstop Édgar Rentería from the Boston Red Sox.

==== 2006: Struggles ====
In 2006, the Braves did not perform at the level they had grown accustomed to. Due to an offensive slump, injuries to their starting rotation, and subpar bullpen performances, the Braves compiled a 6–21 record during June, the worst month ever in Atlanta with a winning percentage of .222; this was only better than the woeful Boston Braves in May 1935 (4–20) with a .166 winning percentage.

After the break, the Braves came out with their bats swinging, setting many franchise records. They won five straight, sweeping the Padres and taking two from the Cardinals, tallying a total of 65 runs in that span. The 65 runs in five games is the best by the franchise since 1897, when the Boston Beaneaters totaled 78, including 25 in one game and 21 in another, from May 31 – June 3; the 2006 Braves also became the first team since the 1930 New York Yankees to score ten runs or more in five straight games. The Braves had a total of 81 hits during their five-game run and 98 hits in their last six games, going back to an 8–3 victory over Cincinnati on July 9, the last game before the All-Star break. Additionally, Chipper Jones was able to maintain a 20-game hitting streak and tie Paul Waner's 69-year-old Major League record with a 14-game extra-base hit streak.

However, on September 18, the New York Mets' win over the Florida Marlins mathematically eliminated the Braves from winning the NL East, ending the Atlanta Braves' 11-year reign over the NL East. On September 24, the Braves' loss to the Colorado Rockies mathematically eliminated the Braves from winning the NL Wild Card, making 2006 the first year that the Braves would not compete in the postseason since 1990, not counting the strike-shortened 1994 season. Also, a loss to the Mets on September 28 guaranteed the Braves their first losing season since 1990. Although the Braves won two of their last three games against the Astros, including rookie Chuck James besting Roger Clemens, Atlanta finished the season in third place, one game ahead of the Marlins, at 79–83.

==== Sale to Liberty Media ====
In December 2005, team owner Time Warner, which inherited the Braves after purchasing Turner Broadcasting System in 1996, announced it was placing the team for sale. Liberty Media began negotiations to purchase the team.

In February 2007, after more than a year of negotiations, Time Warner agreed to a deal to sell the Braves to Liberty Media, which owned a large amount of stock in Time Warner, pending approval by 75 percent of MLB owners and the Commissioner of Baseball, Bud Selig. The deal included the exchange of the Braves, valued in the deal at $450 million, a hobbyist magazine publishing company, and $980 million cash, for 68.5 million shares of Time Warner stock held by Liberty, worth approximately $1.48 billion. Team President Terry McGuirk anticipated no change in the front office structure, personnel, or day-to-day operations of the Braves, and Liberty did not participate in day-to-day operations. On May 16, 2007, Major League Baseball's owners approved the sale. The Braves are one of only two Major League Baseball teams under majority corporate ownership (and the only NL team with this distinction); the other team is the Toronto Blue Jays (owned by Canadian media conglomerate Rogers Communications).

==== 2007: More struggles ====
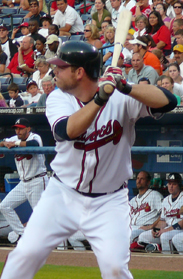
Brian McCann bats for Atlanta in July 2007

On July 5, Chipper Jones surpassed Dale Murphy for the Atlanta club record of 372 home runs by belting two against the Los Angeles Dodgers.

After struggling during the second half of the 2007 season, Atlanta finished over .500 and missed the postseason again. On October 12, 2007, John Schuerholz stepped down as general manager to take over as team president. Assistant GM Frank Wren took over as general manager.

==== 2009: Return of solid pitching ====
On December 4, 2008, the Braves received Javier Vázquez and Boone Logan, while the Chicago White Sox received prospects catcher Tyler Flowers, shortstop Brent Lillibridge, third baseman Jon Gilmore and pitcher Santos Rodriguez. On January 13, 2009, the Braves signed Japanese pitcher Kenshin Kawakami to a three-year deal, and two days later signed free agent pitcher Derek Lowe to a four-year contract. During the course of the offseason, the Braves signed veteran pitcher and former Brave Tom Glavine, while losing long-time Brave John Smoltz to the Boston Red Sox.

On February 25, 2009, just before the start of spring training, Atlanta agreed to terms on a one-year contract with free-agent outfielder Garret Anderson. The additional outfield depth allowed the Braves to trade Josh Anderson to the Detroit Tigers for minor league pitcher Rudy Darrow on March 30, 2009.

On June 3, 2009, the Braves acquired Nate McLouth from the Pittsburgh Pirates for prospects Jeff Locke, Charlie Morton and Gorkys Hernández. They also released veteran pitcher Tom Glavine. On July 10, 2009, the Braves traded outfielder Jeff Francoeur to the New York Mets for outfielder Ryan Church. On July 31, 2009, hours before the trade deadline, the Braves and Boston Red Sox swapped 1st basemen: Atlanta dealt Casey Kotchman to Boston and reacquired Adam LaRoche, whom the Braves had traded away during the 2006–07 off-season to Pittsburgh.

The Braves made a late-season surge, coming within 2 games of the wild card leading Colorado Rockies in late September. On October 1, 2009, with the Braves four games back, Colorado beat the Milwaukee Brewers 9–2 to clinch the wild card spot and end the Braves' 2009 postseason hopes.

==== 2010: Cox's final season ====
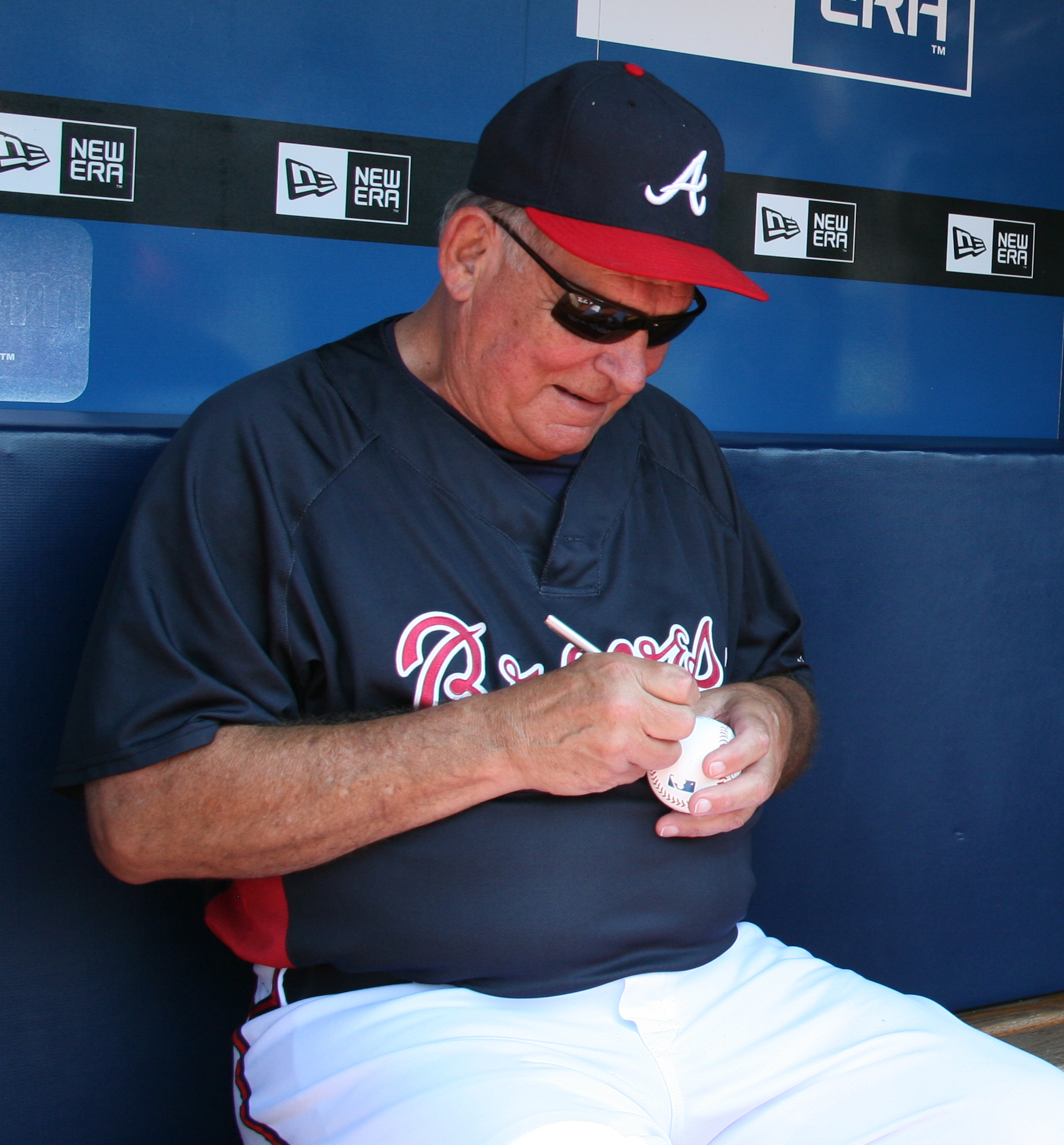
Braves manager Bobby Cox retired in 2010 after 25 years of management.

The 2010 Braves' season featured an attempt to reclaim a postseason berth for the first time since 2005. The Braves were once again skippered by Bobby Cox, in his 25th and final season managing the team. The Braves started the 2010 season slowly and had a nine-game losing streak in April. Then they had a nine-game winning streak from May 26 through June 3, the Braves longest since 2000 when they won 16 in a row. On May 31, the Atlanta Braves defeated the then-first place Philadelphia Phillies at Turner Field to take sole possession of first place in the National League East standings, a position they had maintained through the middle of August. The last time the Atlanta Braves led the NL East on August 1 was in 2005. On July 13, 2010, at the 2010 MLB All-Star Game in Anaheim, Braves catcher Brian McCann was awarded the All-Star Game MVP Award for his clutch two-out, three-run double in the seventh inning to give the National League its first win in the All-Star Game since 1996. He became the first Brave to win the All-Star Game MVP Award since Fred McGriff did so in 1994. The Braves made two deals before the trade deadline to acquire Álex González, Rick Ankiel and Kyle Farnsworth from the Toronto Blue Jays and Kansas City Royals, giving up shortstop Yunel Escobar, pitchers Jo-Jo Reyes and Jesse Chavez, outfielder Gregor Blanco and three minor leaguers. On August 18, 2010, they traded three pitching prospects for first baseman Derrek Lee from the Chicago Cubs. On August 22, 2010, against the Chicago Cubs, Mike Minor struck out 12 batters across 6 innings, an Atlanta Braves single game rookie strikeout record. The Braves dropped to second in the NL East in early September, but won the NL Wild Card. They lost to the San Francisco Giants in the National League Division Series in four games. Every game of the series was determined by one run. After the series-clinching victory for the Giants in Game 4, Bobby Cox was given a standing ovation by the fans, also by players and coaches of both the Braves and Giants.

==== 2011: Fredi González takes over ====
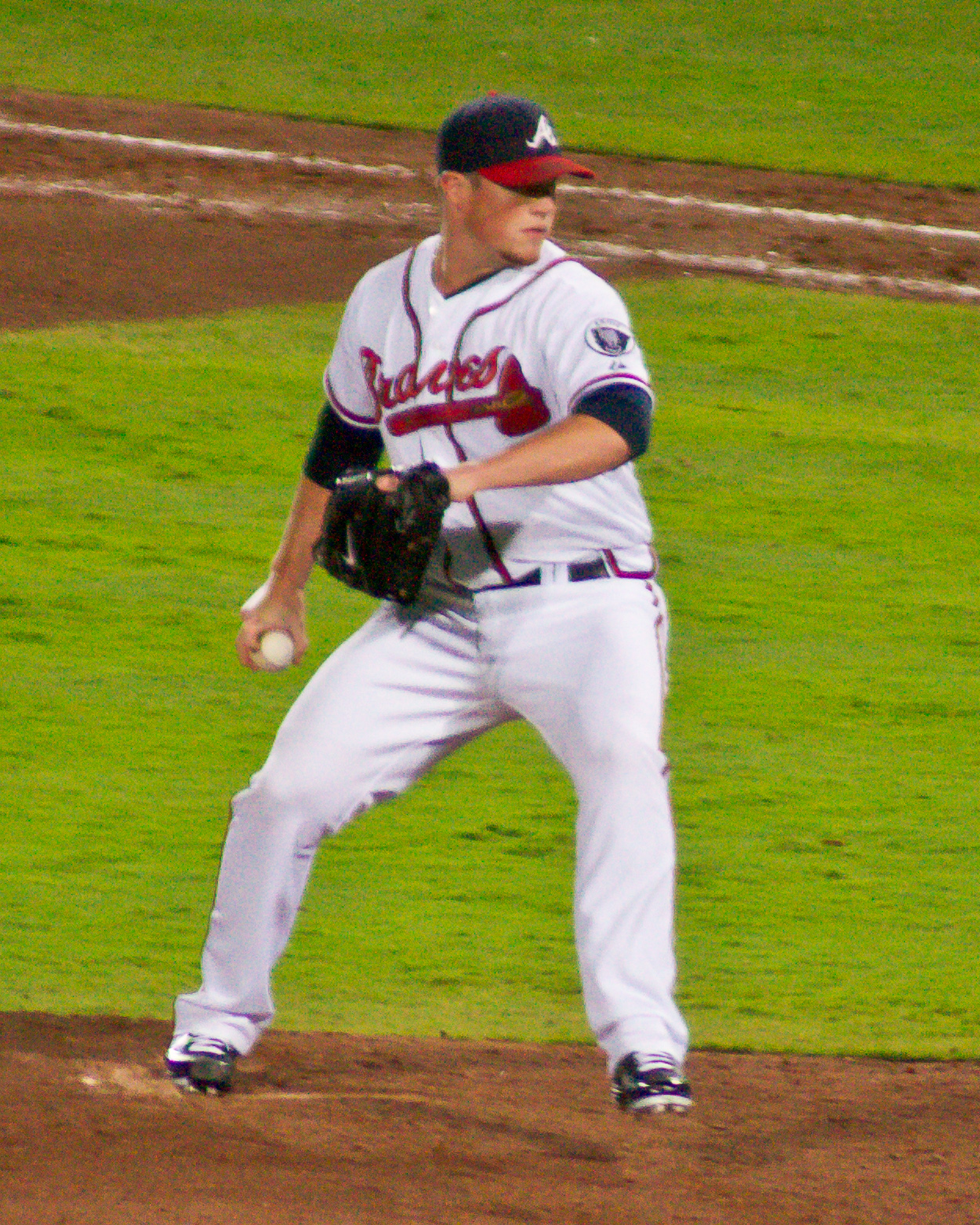
Braves closer Craig Kimbrel pitching in 2011

On October 13, 2010, the Braves announced that Fredi González would replace long-time Braves manager Bobby Cox as manager of the team in 2011. The announcement came just two days after the 2010 Braves were eliminated from the postseason. It was also announced that pitching coach Roger McDowell, third-base coach Brian Snitker, and bullpen coach Eddie Pérez would retain their current positions, while former hitting coach Terry Pendleton would replace Glenn Hubbard as the first-base coach and newcomer Carlos Tosca would become the new bench coach. Hubbard and former bench coach Chino Cadahia were not offered positions on the new coaching staff. Larry Parrish was hired as hitting coach on October 29, 2010.

On November 16, 2010, in an offseason trade, the Braves acquired Dan Uggla from the Florida Marlins in exchange for left-handed reliever Mike Dunn and infielder Omar Infante. According to Elias Sports Bureau, the Braves had an all-time franchise win–loss record over .500 for the first time since 1923 after their win over the Houston Astros on June 11, 2011. The Braves franchise became the third franchise in MLB history to reach 10,000 wins with their win over the Washington Nationals on July 15, 2011. On July 31, 2011, just sixteen days after registering their 10,000th win, the Florida Marlins defeated the Braves by a score of 3–1, handing the team the 10,000th loss in franchise history. The Braves become only the second team in big league history with 10,000 losses after the Philadelphia Phillies reached the plateau in 2007.

Players from the Braves' farm system, such as Freddie Freeman and Brandon Beachy, played regularly with the big league club, while Julio Teherán, Randall Delgado, and Mike Minor were called up for spot starts. With late season injuries to starters Jair Jurrjens and Tommy Hanson, these three young pitchers made their way into the starting rotation in their absence. Eight players made their major league debuts for the team in 2011.

===== September collapse =====
The Braves led the National League Wild Card standings for much of the 2011 season, with the division-rival Philadelphia Phillies firmly in control of first place in the National League East. The Braves entered the final month of the regular season 25 games above .500 with a record of 80–55 and an 8 1/2-game lead in the Wild Card standings. The nearest team trailing them, the St. Louis Cardinals, who also trailed the National League Central-leading Milwaukee Brewers by 8 1/2 games at the time, were considered a long-shot to gain a spot in the postseason. Just days prior on August 26, the Cardinals found themselves 10 1/2 games behind and in third place.

With 27 games to play, the Braves went 9–18 in September to finish the season with a record of 89–73 and missed the postseason. The Cardinals, meanwhile, went 18–8 to finish at 90–72. Braves closer Craig Kimbrel, who had not surrendered a single earned run in July or August, carried a 4.76 ERA in September with three blown saves. After being dominant in his role for much of the season, Braves setup man Jonny Venters posted a 5.11 September ERA. These sharp declines in both relievers led many critics to question the handling of the bullpen by Braves manager Fredi González. Veteran starter Derek Lowe posted a win–loss record of 0–5 in September with an ERA of 8.75. Shortly into the offseason, Lowe would be traded to the Cleveland Indians. The Braves starters lasted six or more innings only three times over the last 23 games. Over the last five games, all of which were losses for the Braves, the team managed to score only seven runs. Braves catcher Brian McCann, often regarded as the best offensive catcher in the Majors, hit only .183 with two home runs in September. The offense as a whole hit for only a .235 batting average and a .300 on-base percentage in September, both second-worst in the National League. The .195 RISP average by Braves hitters was second worst in the Majors. Hitting coach Larry Parrish was fired two days following the last game of the season.

==== 2012: Chipper's last season ====
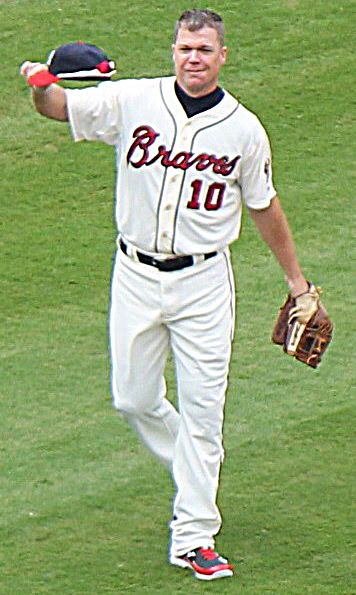
Chipper Jones salutes the crowd at Turner Field prior to his final regular-season game on September 30, 2012. Jones announced he would retire after 19 seasons with the Braves.

In 2012, the Braves began their 138th season after an upsetting end to the 2011 season. On March 22, the Braves announced that third baseman Chipper Jones would retire following the 2012 season after 19 Major League seasons with the team. The Braves also lost many key players through trades or free agency, including pitcher Derek Lowe, shortstop Alex González, and outfielder Nate McLouth. To compensate for this, the team went on to receive many key players such as outfielder Michael Bourn, along with shortstops Tyler Pastornicky and Andrelton Simmons. To fill the void of a quality starting pitcher left by Lowe (as well as a mid-season injury to Brandon Beachy), manager Fredi González elected relief pitcher Kris Medlen to the starting pitching rotation. The Braves went on to win every game Medlen started, setting the MLB record for most consecutive wins when a single pitcher starts (total of 23). Atlanta stayed close to the Washington Nationals in the race to win the National League East title. They also stayed on top of the National League Wild Card race. Washington ended up winning their first division title in franchise history, but the Braves remained in first place of the NL wild-card race. Keeping with a new MLB rule for the 2012 season, the top two wild card teams in each league must play each other in a playoff game before entering into the Division Series.

The Braves played the St. Louis Cardinals in the first-ever Wild Card Game. The Braves were behind 6–3 in the bottom of the eighth inning when Andrelton Simmons hit a fly ball to left field that dropped in between the Cardinals shortstop and left fielder. Umpire Sam Holbrook called Simmons out, citing the infield fly rule. Had an infield fly not been called, Simmons would have been credited with a single and Atlanta would have had the bases loaded with one out. Fans at Turner Field began to litter the field with debris, prompting the game to be delayed for 19 minutes. The Braves lost the game 6–3, ending their season.

==== 2013: Braves win the East ====
Following a gut-wrenching exit against the St. Louis Cardinals in the Wild Card Game, the Braves spent the 2012–2013 offseason revamping and retooling their offense. The Braves turned heads across baseball by acquiring B.J. Upton from the Tampa Bay Rays, signing him to a 5-year $75.25 million contract and making him their starting center fielder, and uniting him with his younger brother Justin Upton from the Arizona Diamondbacks in a seven-player trade that sent fan favorite utility man Martín Prado to the Diamondbacks, they also filled a need for a new Third Baseman in Chris Johnson after the retirement of Chipper Jones the previous year. The Braves began the 2013 season with a hot start in April by going 17–9 for the month, which saw the emergence of rookie sensation Evan Gattis, while taking hold of first place in the National League East division, a lead they would never relinquish for the rest of the season. The Braves suffered many injuries to key players throughout the season, including injuries to Jason Heyward, Brian McCann, Freddie Freeman, Eric O'Flaherty, Jonny Venters, Ramiro Pena and others, but found a way to win despite these blows to the team. Leading up to the All Star break, First Baseman Freddie Freeman was voted in to play for the 2013 National League All-Star Team, in the 2013 All Star Game, which he did not play. The Braves also witnessed the emergence of rookie pitcher Julio Teherán after much hype during Spring training. From July 26 to August 10, the Braves won 14 games in a row. The winning streak was the longest of its kind since April–May 2000.

On June 28, 2013, the Atlanta Braves retired former third baseman Chipper Jones' jersey, number 10, before the game against the Arizona Diamondbacks. He was honored before 51,300 fans at Turner Field in Atlanta. He served as a staple of the Braves franchise for 19 years before announcing his retirement at the beginning of the 2012 season. Chipper Jones played his last regular-season game for the Braves on September 30, 2012.

The Braves opened up a 15-game lead on the Washington Nationals in the National League East on September 3, 2013, riding that lead en route to its first division title since 2005, the last of 14 straight division titles. This was also Braves manager Fredi González's first division title since beginning his managerial career in 1990; including his first since becoming the manager of the Braves after the 2010 season. The Braves clinched the 18th division title in team history on September 22, 2013 after a Nationals loss to the Marlins in the first game of a double header; the Braves also won their game that day, beating the Chicago Cubs 5–2 at Wrigley Field.

After clinching the division title, they lost to the Dodgers 3–1 in the Division Series.

==== 2014: Losing season ====
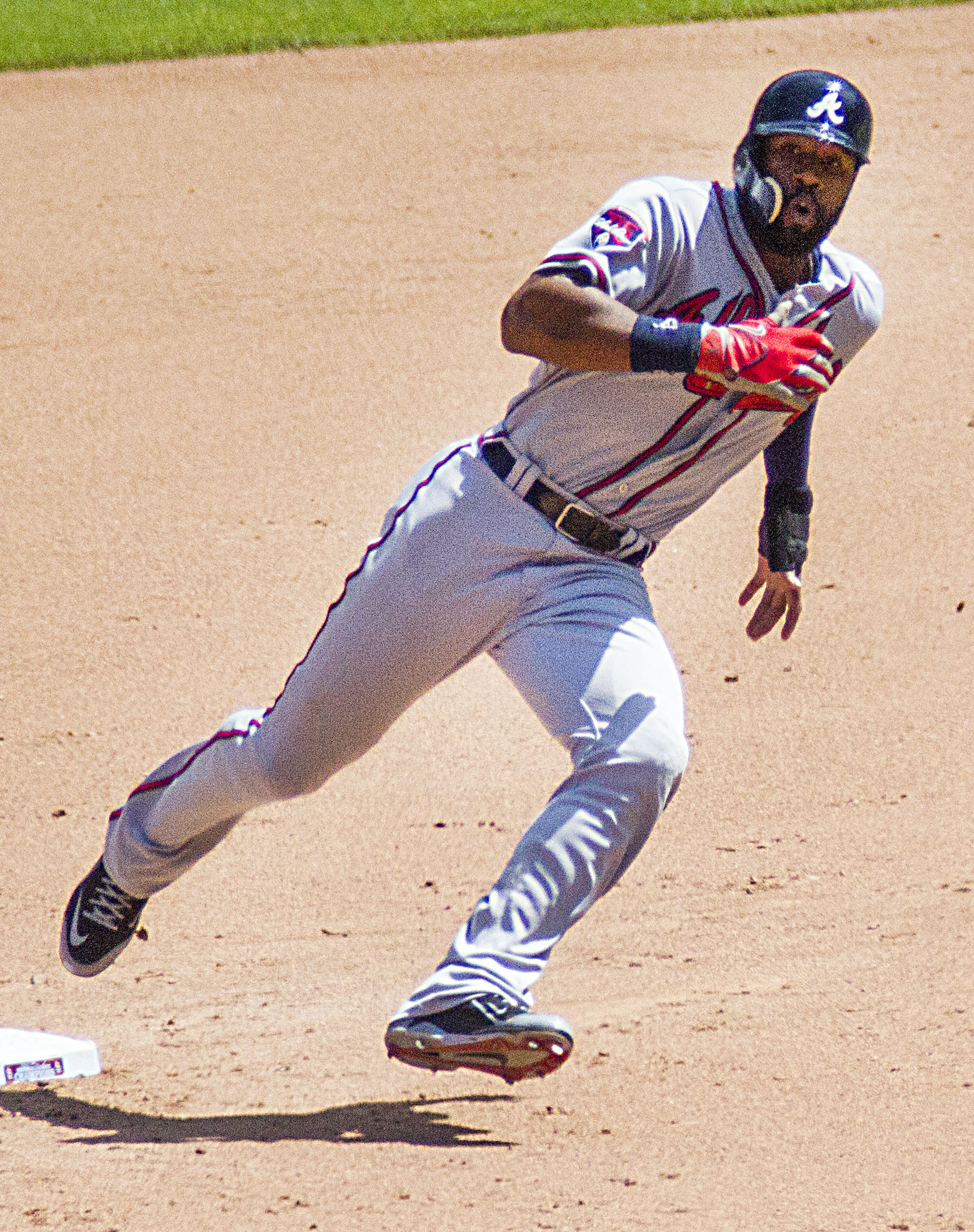
Jason Heyward runs the bases in 2014.

On November 11, 2013, the Braves announced that they would vacate Turner Field for a new stadium in Cobb County, in the northwest suburbs outside of Atlanta in 2017. The move is to follow the expiration of the Braves' 20-year lease on Turner Field in 2016. The new stadium is to be constructed in a public/private partnership. During the offseason the Braves signed few of their young talents to multi year contracts; Craig Kimbrel (4 years/$42 million), Freddie Freeman (8 years/$135M), Kris Medlen (1 year/$5.8M), Jason Heyward (2 years/$13.3M), Julio Teherán (6 years/$32.4M) and Andrelton Simmons (7 years/$58M).

The Braves finished the season in a distant second place with a 79–83 record, which was their first losing season since 2008 and only their third since 1990.

==== 2015–2016: Rebuilding ====
Prior to the 2015 season, the Braves fired general manager Frank Wren, and John Hart replaced him as interim general manager, choosing to only take the title of president of baseball operations. The Braves promptly traded Gold Glove Award winner Jason Heyward to the St. Louis Cardinals along with pitcher Jordan Walden for pitchers Shelby Miller and Tyrell Jenkins. Hart traded All-Star left fielder Justin Upton to the San Diego Padres for Max Fried, Jace Peterson, Dustin Peterson, and Mallex Smith. Catcher Evan Gattis and minor league prospect James Hoyt were traded to the Houston Astros for minor leaguers Mike Foltynewicz, Rio Ruiz, and Andrew Thurman. A day before the season began, the Braves made a final trade involving former All-Star Craig Kimbrel and outfielder Melvin Upton Jr. They were traded to the San Diego Padres for outfielders Cameron Maybin, Carlos Quentin, pitcher Matt Wisler, and the 41st overall pick in the 2015 Major League Baseball draft. By the beginning of the season, the Braves made 11 trades in all.

Prior to the start of the 2016 regular season, the Braves continued their offseason rebuilding by trading Andrelton Simmons to the Los Angeles Angels for Erick Aybar and pitching prospects Sean Newcomb and Chris Ellis and $2.5 million. They agreed to one-year contracts with Kelly Johnson, Chris Withrow, and Arodys Vizcaino, and agreed to terms on a minor league contract for Carlos Torres and Jeff Francoeur. The Braves purchased the major league contract of Francoeur.

On April 13, 2016, Hector Olivera was arrested and charged with the assault of a woman at the team hotel when the Braves were in Washington D.C. facing the Nationals. He was placed on administrative leave by MLB and was placed on the Braves restricted list.

The Braves began the season on a nine-game losing streak, which is the worst opening by the franchise since 1988, when they dropped the first 10 games of that season.

After a 9–28 start in 2016, Fredi González was fired on May 17 and replaced by Gwinnett Braves' manager Brian Snitker as interim manager. Snitker replaced González once before in the 2006–07 offseason as the Braves third base coach when González left the Braves to manage the Marlins. The Braves finished the season 68–93 and in last place in NL East.

During the 2016 offseason, the Braves signed pitchers R. A. Dickey and Bartolo Colón and promoted interim manager Brian Snitker to full-time manager.

==== 2017: New ballpark and front office changes ====
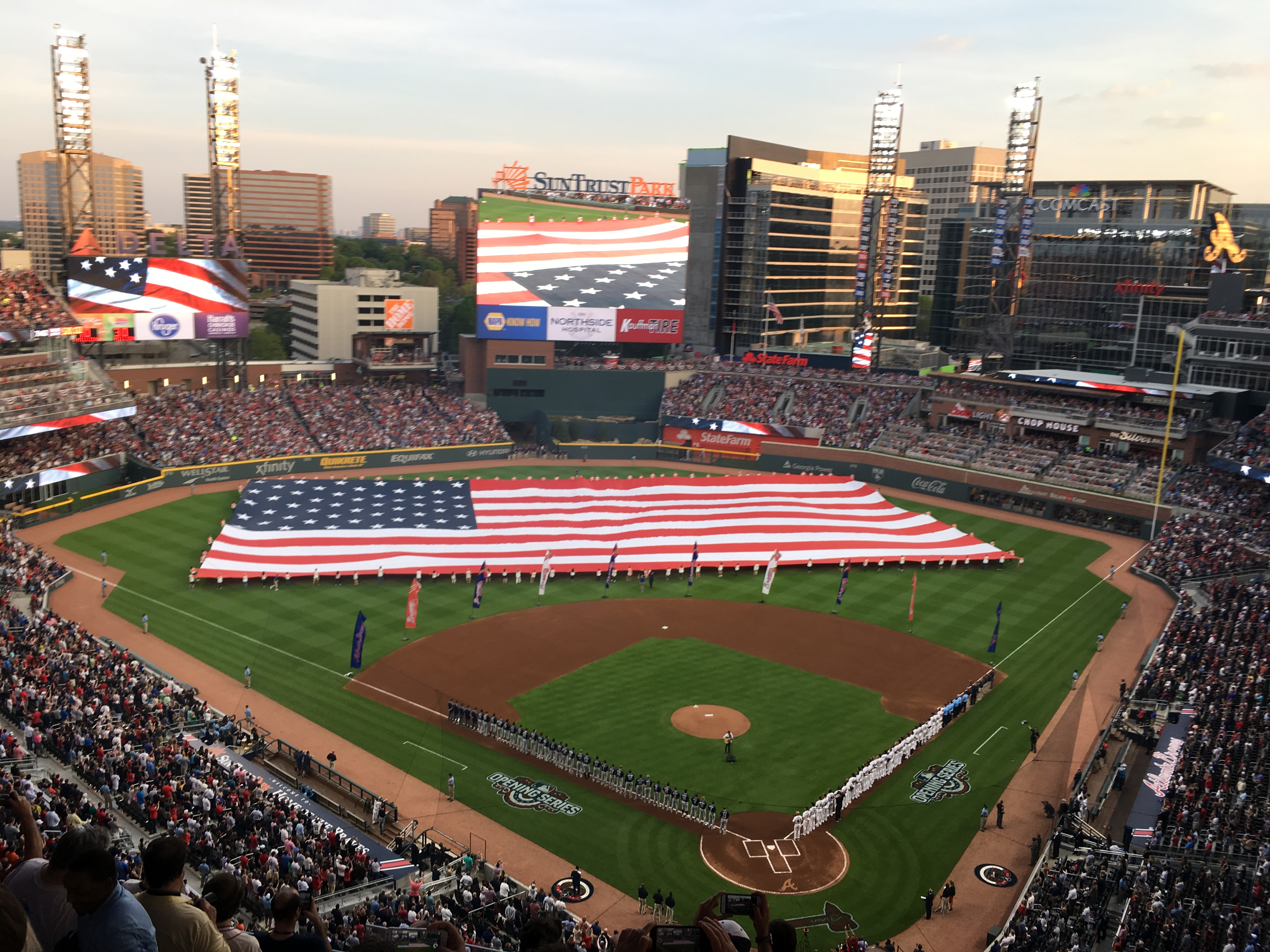
SunTrust Park (now Truist Park) prior to its first regular-season game

The Braves opened their new stadium, SunTrust Park (now Truist Park), on April 14, 2017, with a four-game sweep of the San Diego Padres. The park received positive reviews. Woody Studenmund of the Hardball Times called the park a "gem" saying that he was impressed with "the compact beauty of the stadium and its exciting approach to combining baseball, business and social activities." J.J. Cooper of Baseball America praised the "excellent sight lines for pretty much every seat." Cooper also noted that "the Wi-Fi works and it's very fast, even with a park full of smartphone users." The Braves also introduced "The Freeze" as between-innings entertainment—a former college sprinter, dressed in aqua spandex, has a footrace with a fan; The Freeze wins the majority of the races, despite the fan being given a significant head start.

On October 2, 2017, John Coppolella resigned as general manager of the Braves amid a Major League Baseball investigation into Atlanta's international signings, having committed what the Braves termed "a breach of MLB rules regarding the international player market". On November 13, 2017, the Braves announced Alex Anthopoulos as the new general manager and executive vice president. John Hart was removed as team president and assumed a senior adviser role with the organization. Braves chairman Terry McGuirk apologized to fans "on behalf of the entire Braves family" for the scandal. McGuirk described Anthopoulos as "a man of integrity" and that "he will operate in a way that will make all of our Braves fans proud." On November 17, 2017, the Braves announced that John Hart had stepped down as senior advisor for the organization. Hart said in a statement that "with the hiring of Alex Anthopoulos as general manager, this organization is in great hands."

===== MLB investigation and penalties =====
On November 21, 2017, Major League Baseball Commissioner Rob Manfred announced the findings of the MLB investigation into Atlanta's international signings. Manfred ruled that the Braves must forfeit 13 international prospects, including highly touted Kevin Maitan, an infielder from Venezuela who signed for $4.25 million in 2016. The team also forfeited a third-round draft pick in the 2018 draft. Former Braves general manager John Coppolella was placed on baseball's permanently ineligible list.

Additionally, the Braves shall be prohibited from signing any international player for more than $10,000 during the 2019–20 signing period and their international signing bonus pool for the 2020–21 signing period will be reduced by 50%.

==== 2018–2023: Return to the postseason and World Series title ====
The Braves introduced a new mascot named Blooper on January 27, 2018 at the Atlanta Braves fan fest. Blooper succeeded the Braves' "Homer of the Brave" mascot after he went into retirement. The Braves began a new streak of NL East division titles in 2018, when they went 90–72. In 2019, their 97–65 record was their best since 2003. However, in neither season did the Braves advance past the Division Series. In the 2020 National League Championship Series against the Dodgers, the Braves led 3–1 before the Dodgers came back to win the series and advance to the World Series. The Braves returned to the NLCS in 2021 after beating the Milwaukee Brewers 3–1 in the 2021 NLDS on the heels of a Freddie Freeman game-winning home run in the bottom of the 8th inning in Game 4. With the score tied at 4, Freeman delivered a blast to left center field to give the Braves a 5–4 lead headed to the top of the 9th. After allowing a lead off single to Eduardo Escobar, Will Smith subsequently retired the side in order to secure the Braves berth in the NLCS.

On October 23, 2021, the Braves defeated the Dodgers in the National League Championship Series, a rematch of the 2020 NLCS, in six games to advance to the World Series for the first time since 1999, thereby securing their first pennant in 22 years. They defeated the Houston Astros in six games to win their fourth World Series title.

In 2022, the Braves tied with the New York Mets for the best record in the National League East. The Braves were awarded the division title since they were 10–9 against the Mets in the regular season, while the Mets were named the fourth NL seed in the new 12-team postseason format. The Braves were eliminated in the NLDS in four games by the Philadelphia Phillies.

In 2023, the Braves had their best season since 1998, leading the major leagues with a 104–58 record. Right fielder Ronald Acuña Jr. became the first player in MLB history to hit 40 home runs and steal 70 bases in a season and was unanimously named the National League MVP. Once again, the Braves were eliminated in the NLDS in four games by the Philadelphia Phillies.

==== End of playoff run and Snitker era ====
The Braves failed to qualify for the postseason in 2025, ending a streak of seven consecutive appearances. After 49 years with the organization, including ten seasons as manager, the team announced that Snitker would step down from his managerial role and transition into an advisory position with the club. In November 2025, the Braves announced that longtime bench coach Walt Weiss would be promoted to manager. Weiss, a former All-Star shortstop also spent part of his playing career in Atlanta.

== Uniforms ==
=== 1966–1967 ===
The Atlanta Braves originally wore the same uniform design from their final years in Milwaukee, save for the red-brimmed navy cap which was changed from a block "M" to a script "A". Both the home and road uniforms have navy piping and the "Braves" script in red with navy trim, along with chest numbers which were also red with navy trim. The "screaming Indian" patch was added on the left sleeve.

=== 1968–1971 ===
During this period navy became the team's primary color, and pinstripes were worn on the home uniform. The chest numbers and piping were removed, with red only used exclusively on the road uniform. The original navy/red cap was only used at home, while an all-navy cap was used on the road. By 1969, the all-navy cap served as the primary, retiring the navy/red cap.

=== 1972–1975 ===
The Braves entered the polyester era with a new look, changing from navy to royal blue while keeping red as a trim color. Home uniforms were white with blue sleeves, while road uniforms were blue with white sleeves. Chest numbers returned with this uniform. Both sleeves contain a feather patch. Caps became royal blue with white panels, along with a lowercase "a" in red with white and blue trim.

=== 1976–1979 ===
The Braves returned to wearing pinstripes and gray uniforms with this set. The home uniform removed the blue sleeves and feather patch, and replaced them with red pinstripes and collar. The road uniform kept the previous template but returned to a gray base with blue sleeves, with the feather patch exclusive only to the left sleeve. The road uniform also featured a script "Atlanta" in front, with the first "a" in lowercase. In 1979, blue player names were added to the road uniform.

=== 1980–1986 ===
The Braves' home uniform again removed the pinstripes and added player names in blue. Collars and sleeves featured red, white and blue stripes. The road uniform was changed to powder blue minus the contrasting sleeve colors and red trim. In 1981, the road uniform was tweaked slightly, adopting the uppercase "A" script on the word "Atlanta". The Braves also wore two all-blue caps: the home cap featured the white "A" script with red trim, while the road cap lacked the red trim on the "A"; the 1970s caps were worn for the first season of this uniform set in 1980 only.

=== 1987–present ===
The Braves updated their uniform set in 1987, returning to buttoned uniforms and belted pants. This design returned to the classic look they wore in the 1950s.

The white home uniform features red and navy piping, the "Braves" script and tomahawk in front, and radially arched (vertically arched until 2005; sewn into a nameplate until 2012) navy letters and red numbers with navy trim at the back. The gray road uniforms are identical to the white home uniforms save for the "Atlanta" script in front.

Initially, the cap worn with both uniforms is the red-brimmed navy cap with the script "A" in front. In 2008, an all-navy cap was introduced and became the primary road cap the following season.

The Braves have had three different versions of their Friday red alternate home uniform. The first uniform, worn from 2005 to 2013, featured navy and white piping, navy "Braves" script and tomahawk in front, and white letters and navy numbers with white trim at the back. It was paired with a navy cap with red brim featuring the alternate "tomahawk A" logo. From 2014 to 2018, the Braves tweaked the uniform; the "Braves" script was now adorned with stars while the tomahawk was removed. The "tomahawk A" cap was also retired. In 2019, the Braves reverted to a variation of the original red alternate uniform minus the white piping. Starting in 2025, the red alternates were also worn during road games.

The cream alternate uniforms were introduced in February 2012 as a tribute to the Braves' first season in Atlanta in 1966. This set is similar to the primary home uniform, but with chest numbers in place of the tomahawk and blue piping minus the red accents. An alternate "crossing tomahawks" logo featuring the team name and foundation date was added to the left sleeve. The Braves did not wear the cream alternate uniforms during the 2020 season, and retired the uniforms after the 2021 season.

The Braves have worn three versions of their alternate navy blue road jerseys. The first iteration was introduced on opening night of the 2008 season against the Washington Nationals, and featured navy lettering. The only red elements on the uniform can be seen on the tomahawk. For 2019, the Braves drastically changed the uniform to feature red lettering, a red tomahawk and silver piping. For 2024, the Braves have slightly changed the uniform again by adding a red piping, replacing the silver piping.

In 2023, the Braves unveiled their City Connect uniform, with a design inspired by their early 1970s home uniform, including blue sleeves and a red, white and blue triangle as a nod to the "feather" decal on each sleeve. "The A" was emblazoned on the left chest as a nod to Atlanta, and tributes to Hank Aaron's 715th home run in 1974 were placed on the collar and underbrim of the team cap. The cap itself has a white panel with the blue "A" trimmed in white and red.

In 2026, their second City Connect uniform was heavily based on their road powder blue uniforms from 1980, featuring the lowercase "a" on the script "Atlanta" wordmark on the chest in white trimmed with red, along with royal blue numbers. The sleeve patch featured "ATL" in a shape resembling the 1990s TBS logo, in a nod to the team's national superstation coverage. The cap features a powder blue crown with royal blue base emblazoned by a lowercase "a" in white with red drop shadows and royal blue trim.

Unlike the home uniforms, which are worn based on a schedule, the road uniforms are chosen on game day by the starting pitcher. However, they are also subject to Major League Baseball rules requiring the road team to wear uniforms that contrast with the uniforms worn by the home team. Due to this rule, the gray uniforms are worn when the home team chooses to wear navy blue, and sometimes when the home team chooses to wear black.
