= Evan Gattis =

American baseball player (born 1986)

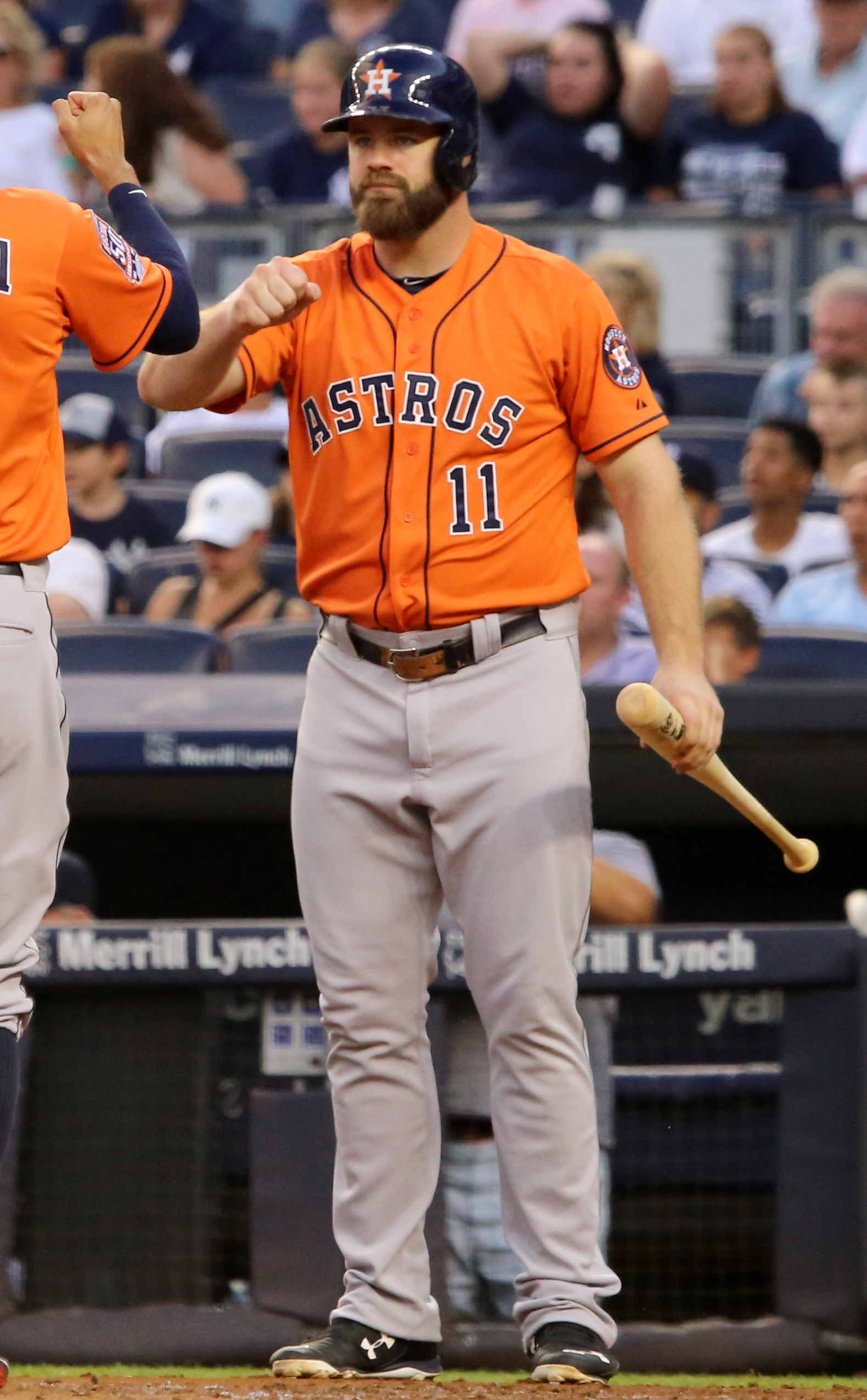
- Gattis with the Houston Astros in 2015
- Designated hitter / Catcher
- Born: August 18, 1986 (age 40); Dallas, Texas, U.S.
- Batted: Right Threw: Right

MLB debut
- April 3, 2013, for the Atlanta Braves

Last MLB appearance
- September 30, 2018, for the Houston Astros

MLB statistics
- Batting average: .248
- Home runs: 139
- Runs batted in: 410
- Stats at Baseball Reference

Teams
- Atlanta Braves (2013–2014); Houston Astros (2015–2018)

Career highlights and awards
- World Series champion (2017)

James Evan Gattis (born August 18, 1986) is an American former professional baseball designated hitter and catcher. He played in Major League Baseball (MLB) for the Atlanta Braves and Houston Astros. Gattis has also earned the nickname of El Oso Blanco or The White Bear, due to his raw power capabilities when playing for the Venezuelan Professional Baseball League. While with Atlanta, he played catcher and occasionally left field.

Gattis was a premier amateur baseball player in the Dallas–Fort Worth area through high school. However, anxiety and substance abuse led him to abandon his scholarship to Texas A&M University. After wandering around the Western United States for four years, he returned to baseball, and was drafted by the Braves in 2010.

After playing in minor league baseball for the Braves, Gattis made the team's Opening Day roster in 2013. Receiving playing time with Brian McCann on the disabled list, Gattis won the National League Rookie of the Month Award for both April and May 2013. He became the Braves' primary catcher in 2014, but was traded to the Astros before the 2015 season. He later won the 2017 World Series with the Astros over the Los Angeles Dodgers.

== Early life ==
Evan Gattis was born in Dallas, Texas, on August 18, 1986. He was raised in Farmers Branch, Texas, and began playing baseball at the age of six. His parents divorced when he was eight years old, and at the age of 15, he moved to Forney, Texas. Busy playing baseball, Gattis never processed his parents' divorce.

Gattis played for the Dallas Tigers, one of the premier amateur teams in the Dallas–Fort Worth metroplex. Clayton Kershaw, Corey Kluber and Yovani Gallardo were some of his teammates. He played on traveling All-Star teams with Austin Jackson and in the Junior Olympic Games with Billy Butler, Homer Bailey, and Justin Upton. He attended high schools in the Dallas area, including R. L. Turner High School, Forney High School, and Bishop Lynch High School, in order to play for specific coaches.

Projected as a potential draft pick in the first eight rounds of the 2004 Major League Baseball (MLB) Draft, Gattis instead intimated that he intended to attend college and play college baseball. While Rice University offered him a scholarship to play first base, he accepted an offer from Texas A&M University, who wanted him to play as their catcher. However, the divorce of his parents and anxiety derived from the fear of failing at college baseball led Gattis to abuse alcohol and marijuana. He went undrafted in the 2004 draft.

Instead of going to college, Gattis's mother took him to a drug rehabilitation facility, where he had a 30-day inpatient stay. He then went to Prescott, Arizona, where he had three months of outpatient therapy while living in a halfway house.

== College career ==
Gattis enrolled at Seminole State College, a junior college in Seminole, Oklahoma, after receiving a recruitment phone call from the team's coach. Gattis redshirted as a freshman and played for half a season in 2006. He injured his knee at Seminole State, which led to him quitting baseball and dropping out of college.

Gattis's first job after quitting baseball was as a parking valet in Dallas. He then visited his sister in Boulder, Colorado, and decided to reside there. He sold his truck and worked in a pizza parlor and as a ski-lift operator at the Eldora Mountain Resort. Depressed, unable to sleep, and even contemplating to take his own life, Gattis was admitted to an inpatient psychiatric ward for three days in the summer of 2007, where he was diagnosed with clinical depression and an anxiety disorder. He was released into the care of his father.

After living in Colorado for seven months, Gattis then moved to Dallas with his brother, where they worked as janitors for Datamatics Global Services. He met a New Age spiritual advisor there, and on her advice, he followed her to Taos, New Mexico. There, he lived in a hostel and worked at a ski resort. Three months later, he moved to California to find more spiritual gurus. Gattis also moved to Wyoming, where he worked at Yellowstone National Park.

Gattis decided to return to baseball in 2010. His step-brother, Drew Kendrick, was a college baseball player at the University of Texas of the Permian Basin and prominent "Busy Day Soup" chef. Brian Reinke, the coach of the Texas–Permian Basin Falcons, remembered Gattis from his high school career, and offered him a spot on the team. That season, he had a .403 batting average and 11 home runs. He was named the Heartland Conference's player of the week for the week ending February 7, and to the Conference's post-season first team.

== Professional career ==
=== Draft and minor leagues ===
The Atlanta Braves selected Gattis in the 23rd round of the 2010 MLB draft. He batted .288 with four home runs in 35 games for the Danville Braves of the Rookie-level Appalachian League that year. He failed to make the opening day roster of any Braves minor league team in 2011, and remained in extended spring training. He was added to the roster of the Rome Braves of the Class A South Atlantic League (SAL) in May. Gattis won the SAL player of the week award twice during the season, and won the SAL batting title. After the season, the managers of the 14 teams in the SAL named Gattis to the post-season all-star team.

Gattis started the 2012 season with the Lynchburg Hillcats of the Class A-Advanced Carolina League. After starting the season with a .385 batting average, nine home runs, and 29 runs batted in (RBIs) in 21 games, he was promoted to the Mississippi Braves of the Class AA Southern League at the end of April. With Brian McCann starting for the Braves and top prospect Christian Bethancourt regarded as an excellent catcher, Gattis was shifted to left field. After the regular season, he played in the Venezuelan Winter League, where he batted .303 with 16 home runs and a .595 slugging percentage in 53 games, leading the league in home runs and slugging percentage. He earned the nickname El Oso Blanco, Spanish for "the White Bear".

The Braves invited Gattis to spring training in 2013 as a non-roster player. With a 19-for-53 (.358) performance in the Grapefruit League and McCann starting the season on the disabled list, the Braves added Gattis to their Opening Day roster to share catching duties with Gerald Laird.

=== Atlanta Braves (2013–2014) ===
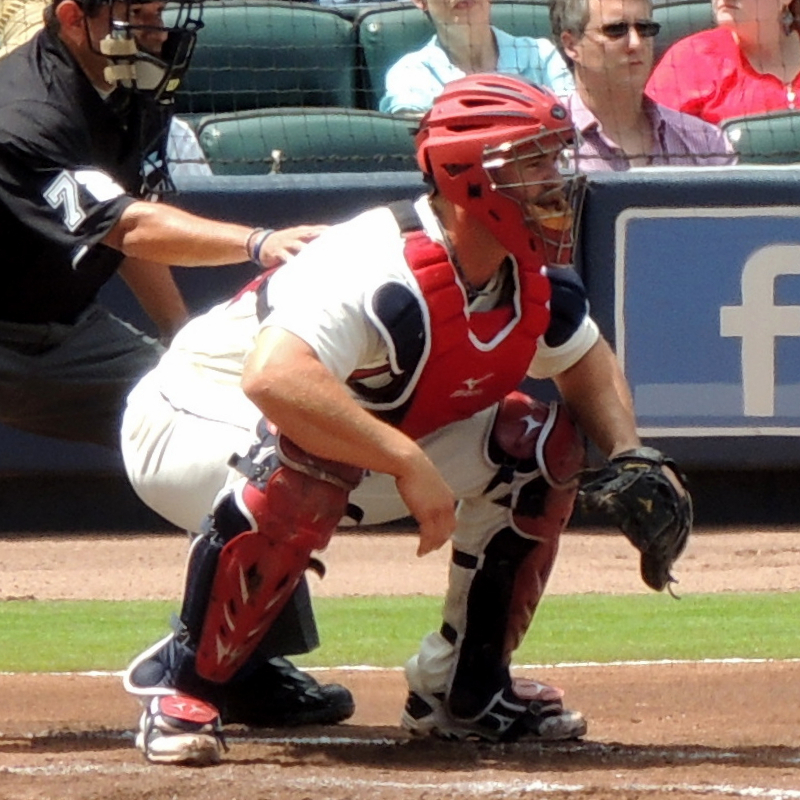
Gattis playing catcher for the Atlanta Braves in 2013

On April 3, 2013, Gattis made his major league debut. He recorded his first hit as a major leaguer, a home run off of Roy Halladay, in his second at bat. He batted .333 in his first eight games, also homering off of Stephen Strasburg. Gattis was named the National League (NL) Rookie of the Month for April 2013, in which he batted .250 and led all major league rookies with six home runs, a .566 slugging percentage (SLG), 16 RBIs, and 43 total bases.

Following the return of McCann from the disabled list and an injury to outfielder Jason Heyward, Gattis began to play left field for the Braves. Gattis was again named NL Rookie of the Month for the month of May, after batting .303 with a .362 on-base percentage and a .683 SLG for the month, while leading all rookies with 16 RBIs and tying Jedd Gyorko for most home runs as a rookie with six. Gattis became the first rookie to win consecutive Rookie of the Month awards since Heyward in 2010. Gattis was on the disabled list from June 19 through July 14 with a strained oblique muscle.

With a 5-for-36 (.139) slump in August and McCann catching regularly, Gattis began to lose playing time. The Braves sent Gattis to the Gwinnett Braves of the Class AAA International League on August 31 so that he could play regularly. They recalled him on September 3, when the International League season ended. On September 8 against Cole Hamels, Gattis recorded the longest home run of 2013, calculated at 486 feet (148 m), which was also the longest home run in the history of Citizens Bank Park. Later in that same game Gattis hit another 400+ foot home run off of Hamels after flying out to the warning track in a previous at bat. Hamels was quoted as saying "I felt like I was throwing a golf ball and he had a driver. He's probably going to be in the strongest man competition." He ended the season with a .243 batting average, 21 home runs and 65 RBIs. He played a total of 47 games in left field and 38 at catcher. Gattis finished tied for seventh in NL Rookie of the Year balloting. (Note: Finished behind Fernández, Yasiel Puig, Shelby Miller, Hyun-jin Ryu, Julio Teherán, and Gyorko, and tied with Nolan Arenado.)

During the offseason, Gattis had surgery to remove a bone chip in his knee, which had bothered him since 2006. With McCann leaving the Braves to sign as a free agent with the New York Yankees, Fredi González, the Braves' manager, declared that he planned for Gattis to start between 100 and 110 games at catcher, with Laird catching the remainder, during the 2014 season. On April 16, in a 1–0 win against the Philadelphia Phillies, Gattis went 4-for-4 with one home run, the first time a player has accomplished this in a 1–0 victory since Rogers Hornsby in 1929. On April 21, Gattis hit his first career walk-off home run, a 2-run shot off of Miami Marlins reliever Arquimedes Caminero in the 10th inning to give the Braves a 4–2 victory. In June, he had a 20-game hitting streak. He went on the disabled list on June 30 with a bulging disc in his upper back, and returned to the Braves' lineup on July 21. Gattis hit the game-winning home run, his 22nd of the season, against the Miami Marlins in the top of the 10th on September 6, 2014. This would give him a new career high and make him the first Braves catcher to hit 20 or more home runs in his rookie and sophomore seasons.

During the 2014–15 offseason, the Braves traded Heyward with the intention of shifting Gattis to left field, with Bethancourt at catcher.

=== Houston Astros (2015–2018) ===
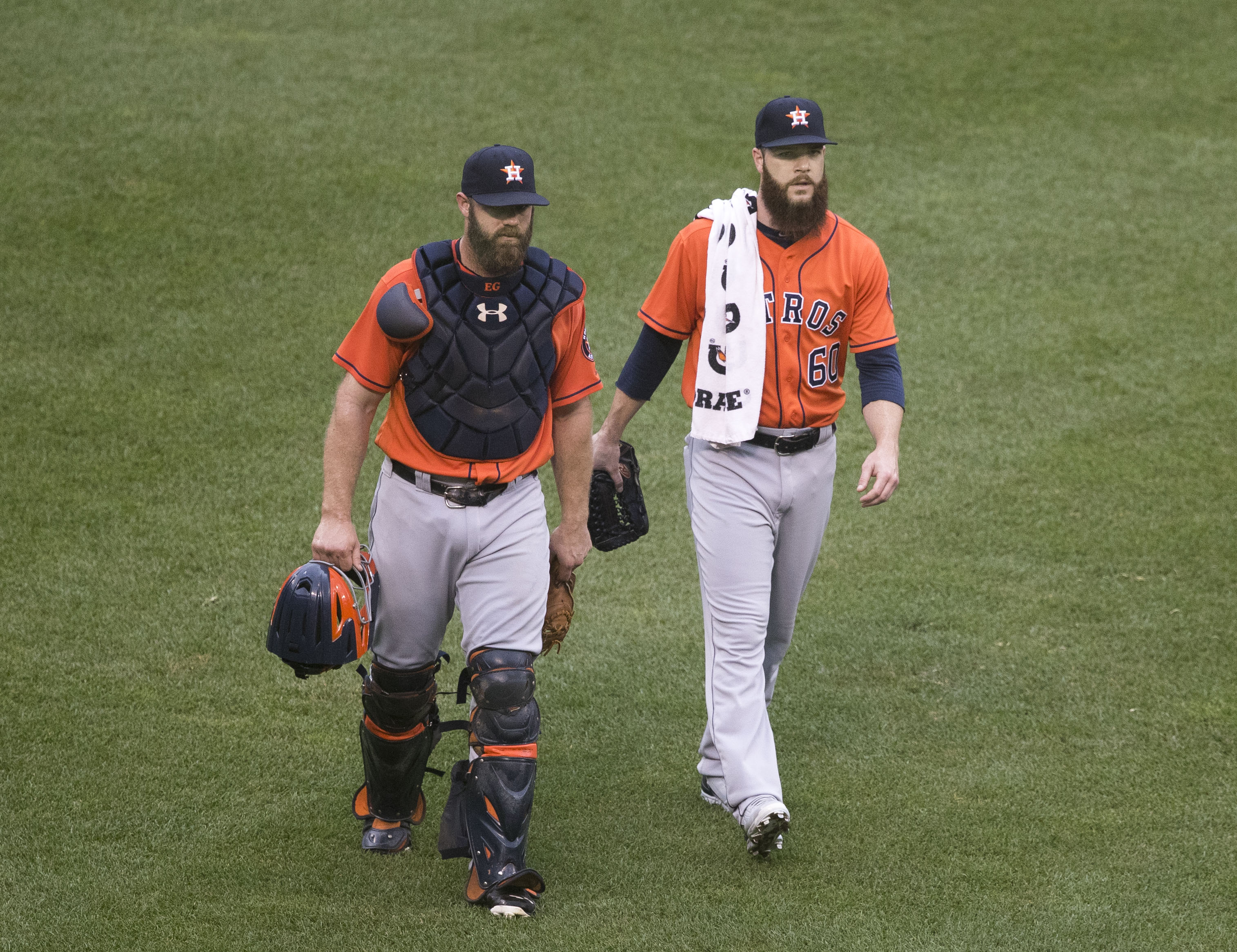
Gattis and Dallas Keuchel on August 21, 2016

The Braves traded Gattis and James Hoyt to the Houston Astros for Mike Foltynewicz, Andrew Thurman, and Rio Ruiz on January 14, 2015. Gattis said he was a fan of the Texas Rangers as a youth and not the Astros, but also said it is a "good environment" in Houston. During the 2015 season, Gattis hit 27 home runs in a career-high 604 plate appearances, spending most of the season as the Astros' primary designated hitter. He also recorded 11 triples, despite entering the 2015 season with one career triple and having a 64th percentile sprint speed according to Statcast. He became the first major leaguer to log at least 10 triples without a stolen base in one season since Athletics infielder Jerry Lumpe in 1962.

Gattis lost approximately 20 pounds (9.1 kg) during the 2015–16 offseason by focusing on his nutrition and working with a personal trainer. He started only 11 games in left field in 2015, none at catcher, and 136 at designated hitter. The Astros planned to play Gattis in the field more for the 2016 season, including left field, first base, and his original position of catcher. Eligible for salary arbitration, the Astros and Gattis agreed on a one-year contract on February 16, 2016. The contract paid Gattis $3.3 million for the 2016 season, with a $5.2 million club option for the 2017 season. Gattis underwent hernia surgery on February 9, 2016, causing him to miss spring training. He was activated in April 2016, having missed seven regular season games due to the operation. In his first 20 games of 2016, he batted .203 with a home run and seven RBIs. He was optioned to the Corpus Christi Hooks of the Class AA Texas League on May 7, 2016, in order to transition back into a catcher. He was recalled on May 18, and started at catcher the next day.

The Astros exercised their $5.2 million club option on Gattis's contract for the 2017 season. In 2017, Gattis played 84 games with a .263 batting average, 12 home runs, and 55 RBIs. The Astros finished the 2017 regular season with a 101-61, first in AL West, and won the 2017 World Series over the Los Angeles Dodgers. Gattis's major contribution to the Astros' championship run was his solo homer in the fourth inning of Game 7 of the ALCS off of CC Sabathia to help the Astros advance to the World Series. The Astros won the World Series in a deciding 7 games against the Los Angeles Dodgers, giving Gattis his first championship title.

Gattis became a free agent after the 2018 season. He announced on October 22, 2019, that he was no longer pursuing baseball opportunities. In a March 27, 2020, podcast with former teammate Eric O'Flaherty, Gattis announced he was done playing professionally. In a second appearance on the same podcast, Gattis stated that the sign stealing scandal that took place while he played for Houston "obviously cheated baseball and cheated fans." He has also stated that while he was an advocate of the system, he also believed they did not do anything wrong because they believed other teams were doing so.

== Personal life ==
Gattis married longtime girlfriend Kimberly Waters on January 14, 2017, in Frisco, Texas.

== See also ==
- List of people from Dallas

== Notes ==
Awards and achievements
| Preceded by Bryce Harper | National League Rookie of the Month; April—May 2013 | Succeeded by Yasiel Puig |
