= Rio Ruiz =

American baseball player (born 1994)

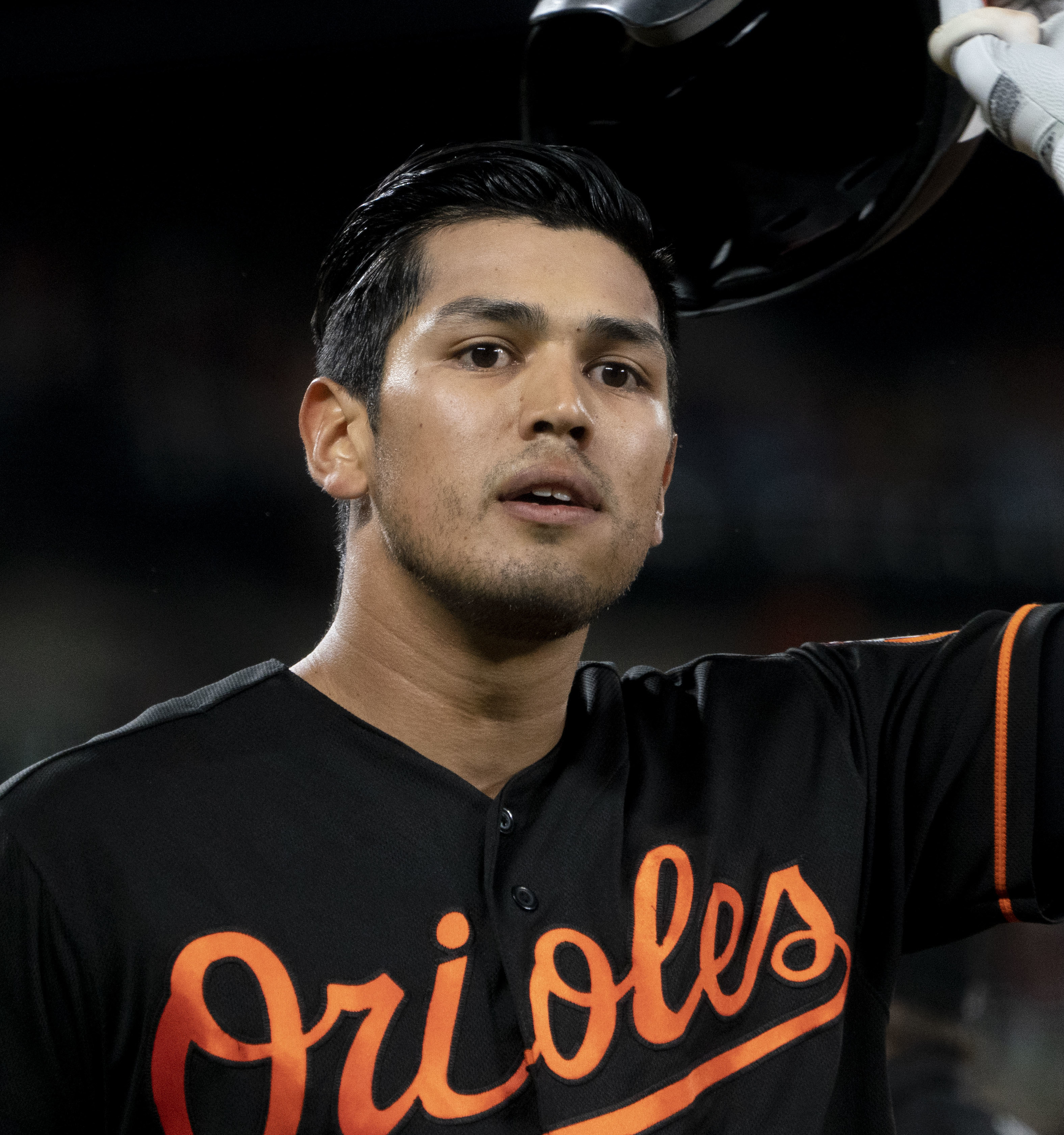
- Ruiz with the Baltimore Orioles in 2019

El Águila de Veracruz
- Third baseman
- Born: May 22, 1994 (age 32); Covina, California, U.S.
- Bats: Left Throws: Right

Professional debut
- MLB: September 18, 2016, for the Atlanta Braves
- KBO: April 2, 2022, for the LG Twins

MLB statistics (through 2021 season)
- Batting average: .212
- Home runs: 28
- Runs batted in: 109

KBO statistics (through 2022 season)
- Batting average: .155
- Home runs: 1
- Runs batted in: 6
- Stats at Baseball Reference

Teams
- Atlanta Braves (2016–2018); Baltimore Orioles (2019–2021); Colorado Rockies (2021); LG Twins (2022)

Rio Noble Ruiz (born May 22, 1994) is an American professional baseball third baseman for El Águila de Veracruz of the Mexican League. He has previously played in Major League Baseball (MLB) for the Atlanta Braves, Baltimore Orioles, and Colorado Rockies, and in the KBO League for the LG Twins. He was selected in the fourth round of the 2012 Major League Baseball draft by the Houston Astros. In 2015, Ruiz was traded to the Atlanta, with whom he made his major league debut during the 2016 season.

== Career ==
=== Amateur career ===
Ruiz attended Bishop Amat Memorial High School in La Puente, California. He played both baseball and football. Ruiz verbally committed to attend the University of Southern California (USC) as a 14-year-old freshman to play college baseball for the USC Trojans baseball team. As a junior, he was named The San Gabriel Valley Tribune's Baseball Player of the Year. Considered a potential first round pick in the 2012 Major League Baseball draft entering his senior season, he missed most of the year due to a blood clot in his right clavicle.

=== Houston Astros ===
The Houston Astros selected Ruiz in the fourth round of the 2012 Major League Baseball draft. He signed with the Astros for $1.85 million over playing college baseball at USC. He made his professional debut that season for the rookie–level Gulf Coast Astros and also played for the Greeneville Astros of the Rookie-level Appalachian League. He finished his first season hitting .252/.336/.400 and one home run in 38 games.

In 2013, Ruiz played for the Quad Cities River Bandits of the Single–A Midwest League. He played in 114 games and hit .260/.335/.430 with 12 home runs. Ruiz spent the 2014 season with the Lancaster JetHawks of the High–A California League. After the regular season, the Astros assigned Ruiz to the Salt River Rafters of the Arizona Fall League.

=== Atlanta Braves ===
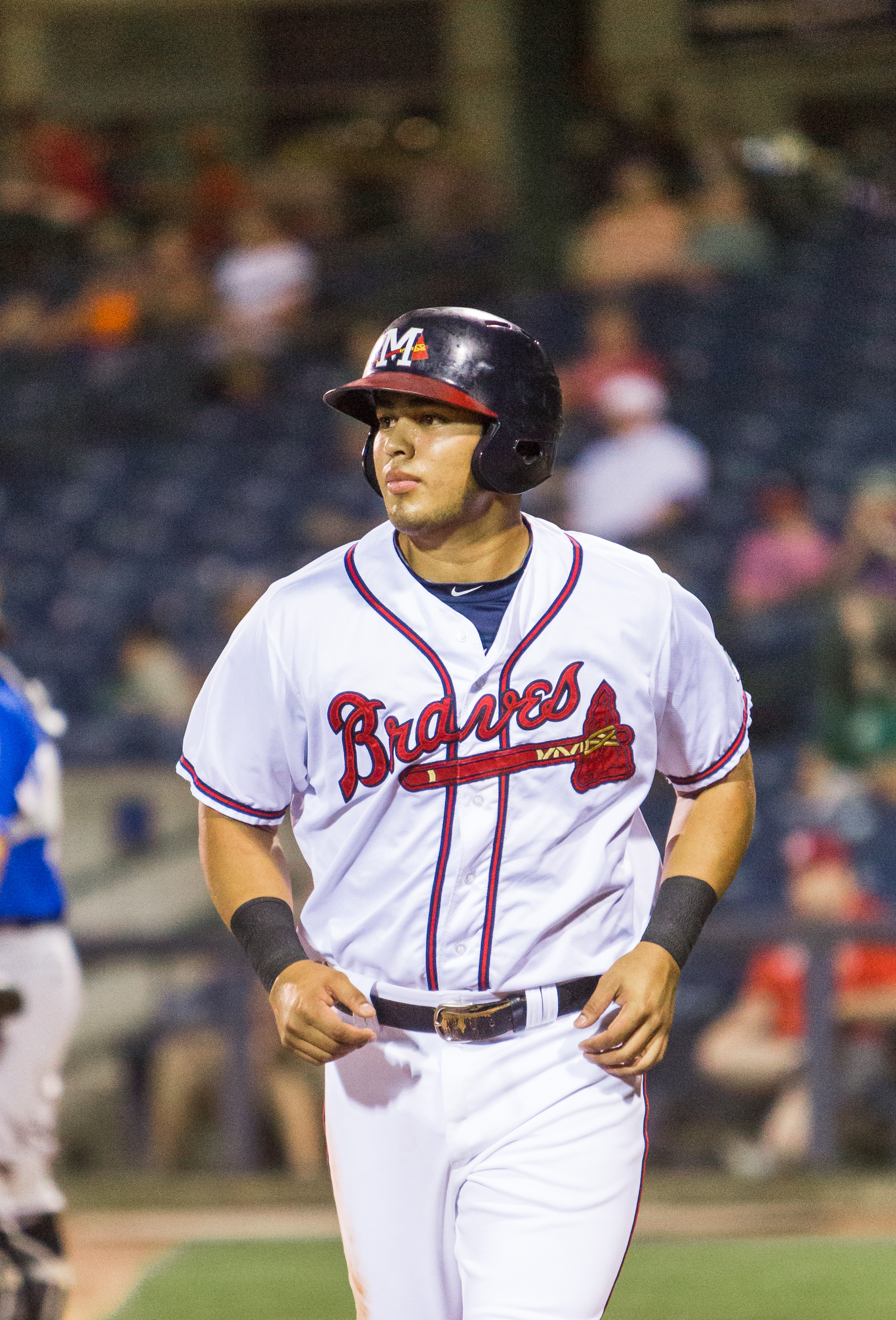
Ruiz with the Mississippi Braves in 2015

The Astros traded Ruiz, Andrew Thurman, and Mike Foltynewicz to the Atlanta Braves in exchange for Evan Gattis and James Hoyt on January 14, 2015. He was assigned to the Mississippi Braves of the Double–A Southern League, where he struggled. Despite inconsistent results in Ruiz's first year with the Braves organization, he was invited to spring training in 2016 and began the season with the Gwinnett Braves of the Triple–A International League. He hit for a .271 batting average and a .755 on-base plus slugging percentage at the Triple A level, to go along with ten home runs and 62 runs batted in.

The Braves promoted Ruiz to the major leagues for the first time on September 17, 2016. The next day, he was announced as a pinch hitter in the seventh inning of a game against the Washington Nationals, but was unable to make a plate appearance before the contest was called due to rain. Ruiz tripled for his first major league hit on September 28, against Philadelphia Phillies pitcher Frank Herrmann.

Before reporting to spring training in 2017, Ruiz sought help from Azusa Pacific University track coach Kevin Reid, who aided Ruiz in improving his agility and conditioning. Ruiz began the 2017 season with Gwinnett and was promoted to the major leagues on May 18. On May 20, 2017, Ruiz hit his first major league home run off Washington Nationals pitcher Max Scherzer. Ruiz started the 2018 season at Gwinnett.

=== Baltimore Orioles ===
The Baltimore Orioles claimed Ruiz off waivers on December 10, 2018. On August 11, 2019, Ruiz hit his first career walk-off home run off Roberto Osuna of the Houston Astros. He finished the 2019 season with a .232 average, 12 home runs and 46 RBI in 370 at–bats.

In 2020 for the Orioles, Ruiz slashed .222/.286/.427 with 9 home runs and 32 RBI. After hitting .167 in 101 plate appearances in 2021, Ruiz was designated for assignment on May 18, 2021.

=== Colorado Rockies ===
On May 24, 2021, Ruiz was claimed off waivers by the Colorado Rockies. The Rockies assigned him to the Albuquerque Isotopes. Ruiz made his debut for Colorado on July 27, 2021. Ruiz played in 30 games for the Rockies, hitting .168 with 3 home runs and 10 RBI. On October 21, Ruiz elected free agency.

=== LG Twins ===
On December 27, 2021, Ruiz signed with the LG Twins of the KBO League. He was waived on May 30, 2022, after struggling to a .155/.234/.262 batting line with one home run and six RBI over 27 games.

=== Diablos Rojos del México ===
On July 13, 2022, Ruiz signed with the Diablos Rojos del México of the Mexican League. In 19 games for México, he hit .329/.461/.486 with two home runs and 21 RBI.

Ruiz made 48 appearances for the Diablos in 2022, slashing .275/.355/.389 with two home runs, 15 RBI, and two stolen bases.

=== Conspiradores de Querétaro ===
On April 10, 2024, Ruiz was traded to the Conspiradores de Querétaro of the Mexican League. In 77 games for Querétaro, he batted .273/.356/.392 with five home runs, 42 RBI, and four stolen bases.

=== Diablos Rojos del México (second stint) ===
On November 19, 2024, Ruiz was traded to the Diablos Rojos del México of the Mexican League. He made 58 appearances for México in 2025, slashing .297/.405/.566 with 11 home runs, 40 RBI, and four stolen bases. With the team, Ruiz won the Serie del Rey.

Ruiz returned to the team in 2026, batting .249/.338/.314 with two home runs and 29 RBI across 63 games played.

=== El Águila de Veracruz ===
On September 24, 2026, Ruiz was traded to El Águila de Veracruz of the Mexican League.

== Personal life ==
Ruiz and his wife Michelle have one son together who was born in 2019.
