= Mike Foltynewicz =

American baseball player (born 1991)

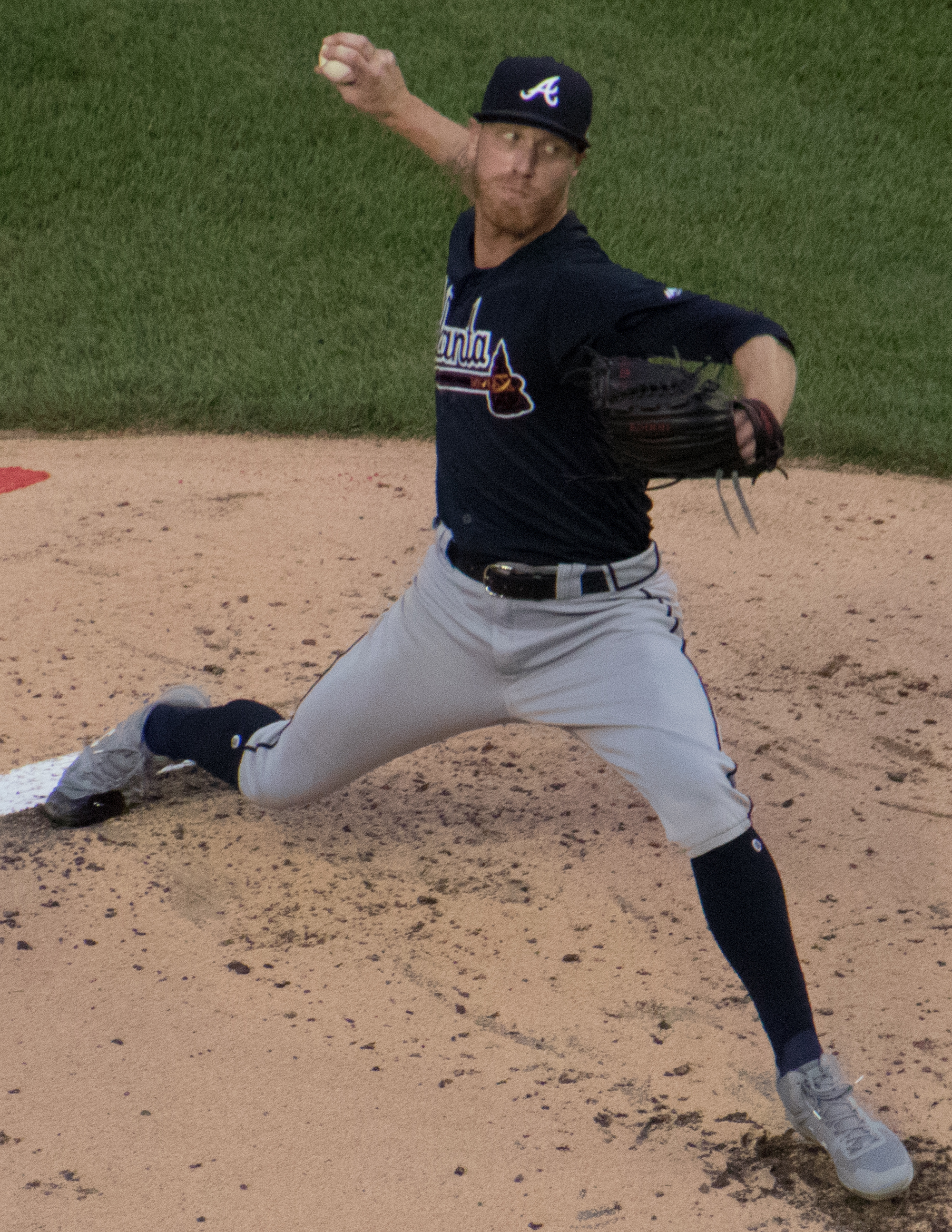
- Foltynewicz with the Atlanta Braves in 2018
- Pitcher
- Born: October 7, 1991 (age 34); Sterling, Illinois, U.S.
- Batted: Right Threw: Right

MLB debut
- August 2, 2014, for the Houston Astros

Last MLB appearance
- October 3, 2021, for the Texas Rangers

MLB statistics
- Win–loss record: 46–54
- Earned run average: 4.52
- Strikeouts: 752
- Stats at Baseball Reference

Teams
- Houston Astros (2014); Atlanta Braves (2015–2020); Texas Rangers (2021)

Career highlights and awards
- All-Star (2018)

Michael Gary Foltynewicz (/foʊltɪˈnɛvɪtʃ/; born October 7, 1991), nicknamed "Folty", is an American former professional baseball pitcher. He played in Major League Baseball (MLB) for the Houston Astros, Atlanta Braves, and Texas Rangers.

The Houston Astros selected Foltynewicz in the first round of the 2010 MLB draft. He played in the minor leagues until he was called up to the Astros in August 2014. The Astros traded Foltynewicz to the Braves before the 2015 season. He appeared in the All-Star Game in 2018. He was designated for assignment by the Braves in 2020.

== Early life ==
Foltynewicz grew up in Illinois and wanted to be a major league player from an early age. He grew up a St. Louis Cardinals fan. He says that his parents, Gary and Cindy Foltynewicz, both developed elbow problems one summer due to throwing him so many pitches during batting practice. He graduated in 2010 from Minooka High School in Minooka, Illinois.

== Career ==
=== Houston Astros ===
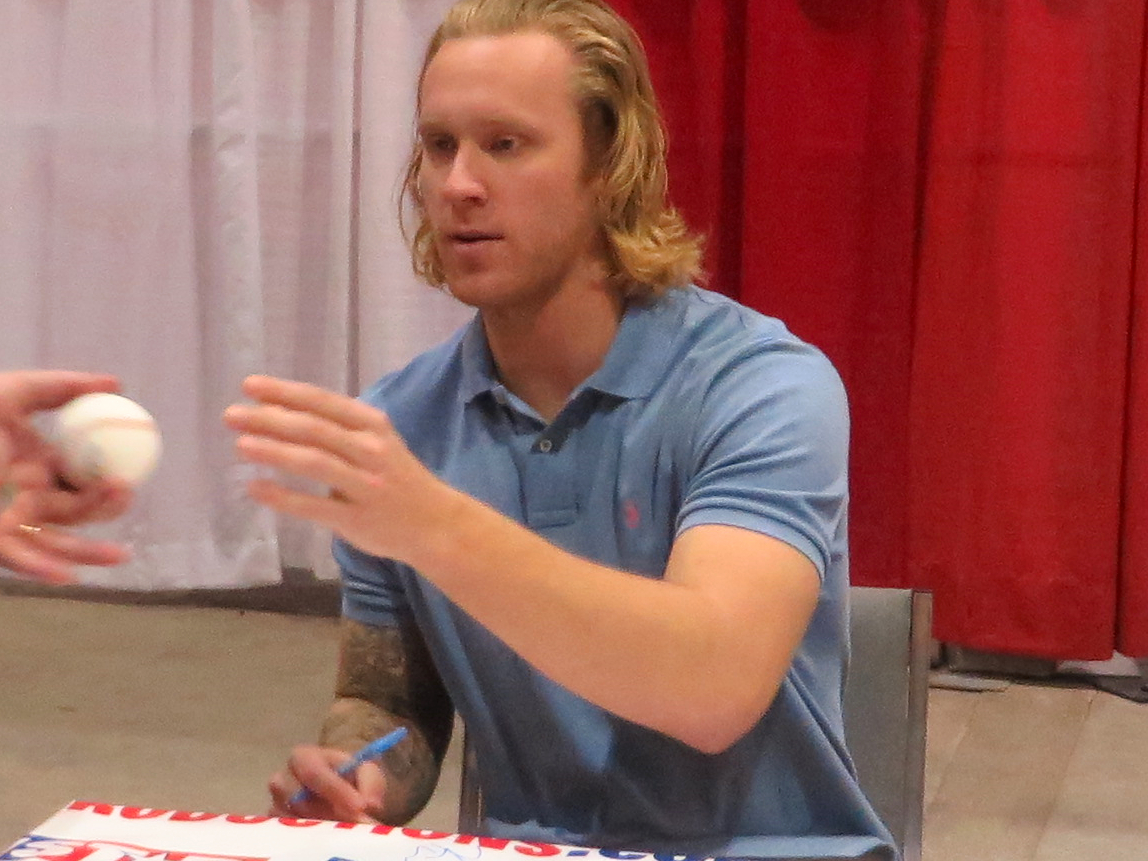
Foltynewicz signing autographs in 2014

The Houston Astros selected Foltynewicz in the first round, with the 19th overall selection, of the 2010 Major League Baseball draft. He planned to attend the University of Texas at Austin, but decided to enter professional baseball when he was chosen in the draft. Foltynewicz and the Astros agreed to a $1.2 million signing bonus. In 2010 with the Greeneville Astros he was 0–3 with a 4.03 ERA. In 2011 at Single-A Lexington, Foltynewicz was 5–11 with a 4.97 ERA with 88 strikeouts over 134 innings of work.

In 2012, Foltynewicz was the Astros Minor League Pitcher of the Year after going 14–4 with a 3.14 earned run average (ERA) and 125 strikeouts in 152 innings pitched. The next season, Foltynewicz pitched seven games (five starts) for the Class A Advanced Lancaster JetHawks and earned a 1–0 record with a 3.81 ERA. He finished the season with the Class AA Corpus Christi Hooks, starting 16 of 23 games on the way to a 5–3 record, a 2.87 ERA and three saves.

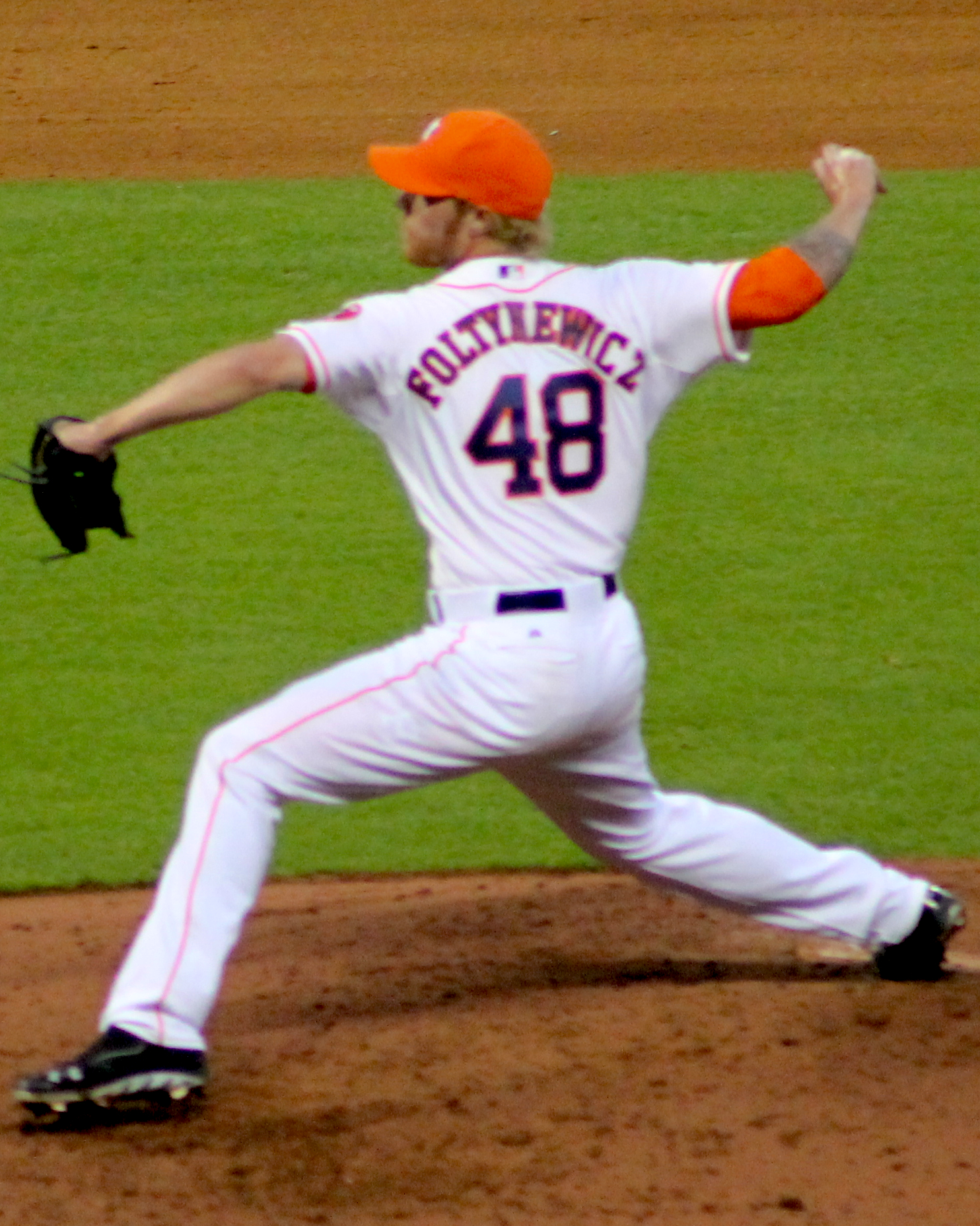
Foltynewicz pitching for the Houston Astros in 2014

Foltynewicz was called up to the Astros on August 1, 2014. His first appearance was against the Toronto Blue Jays on August 2. At the time of his promotion, Foltynewicz had a 7–7 record with a 5.08 ERA at Class AAA Oklahoma City, where he registered 100 strikeouts in 102 2/3 innings. He was listed by both ESPN and Baseball America as the fourth-best prospect in the Houston system. Though he was a starting pitcher in Oklahoma City, Astros general manager Jeff Luhnow said that the team would use Foltynewicz out of the bullpen for the rest of the 2014 season. In 2014 for the Astros he was 0–1 with an ERA of 5.30 in 16 relief appearances.

=== Atlanta Braves ===
The Astros traded Foltynewicz, Andrew Thurman, and Rio Ruiz to the Atlanta Braves in exchange for Evan Gattis and James Hoyt on January 14, 2015. He was invited to spring training and sent down to the Triple–A Gwinnett Braves on April 4. Through his first four starts with Gwinnett, Foltynewicz posted a 2.08 ERA over 21.2 innings with 30 strikeouts and 10 walks. On April 30, third baseman Chris Johnson was moved to the 15-day disabled list, allowing room for the Braves to call up Foltynewicz to replace struggling Trevor Cahill in the starting rotation. Foltynewicz made his Braves debut on May 1 against the Cincinnati Reds, earning his first career win over five innings pitched, allowing two earned runs. On the same night, Folynewicz also recorded his first career hit, a double that scored two runs. Foltynewicz was optioned to Triple-A Gwinnett on June 17 after seeing his ERA rise to 5.19 in his previous three starts. He was recalled on July 7, after utility player Joey Terdoslavich was optioned to Gwinnett. He served as an extra reliever in Atlanta's bullpen during the final games before the All Star break. On July 12, after the final game of the first half, he was optioned back to Gwinnett. Foltynewicz was recalled on July 30 to make a spot start for Manny Banuelos. He began to fall ill on August 18, and was first diagnosed with costochondritis in September, which soon developed into pneumonia. On September 19, Foltynewicz suffered a further setback, and was diagnosed with blood clots in his pitching arm. Two days later, Foltynewicz underwent a rib resection to remove the anterior half of his first rib to deal with the clots. As a result of the surgery, he lost approximately 20 pounds (9.1 kg). In 2015 for Atlanta he was 4–6 with an ERA of 5.71.

Foltynewicz contended for a rotation spot in spring training in 2016. The Braves eventually assigned him to Gwinnett at the end of March to give him more time to recover from surgery. Foltynewicz was recalled on May 1 to replace Bud Norris in the rotation. Foltynewicz made his season debut the next day, taking a loss against the New York Mets. He returned to the disabled list on June 4 with a bone spur in his elbow. Foltynewicz was reactivated on June 29, as the Braves' rotation was beset by injuries to other pitchers.

On June 30, 2017, against the Oakland Athletics, Foltynewicz took a no hitter into the ninth inning; however, he allowed a home run to the leadoff man and was pulled after the home run. He finished having allowed one run on one hit with four walks and eight strikeouts over eight plus innings. In 2017 for Atlanta he was 10–13 with an ERA of 4.79.

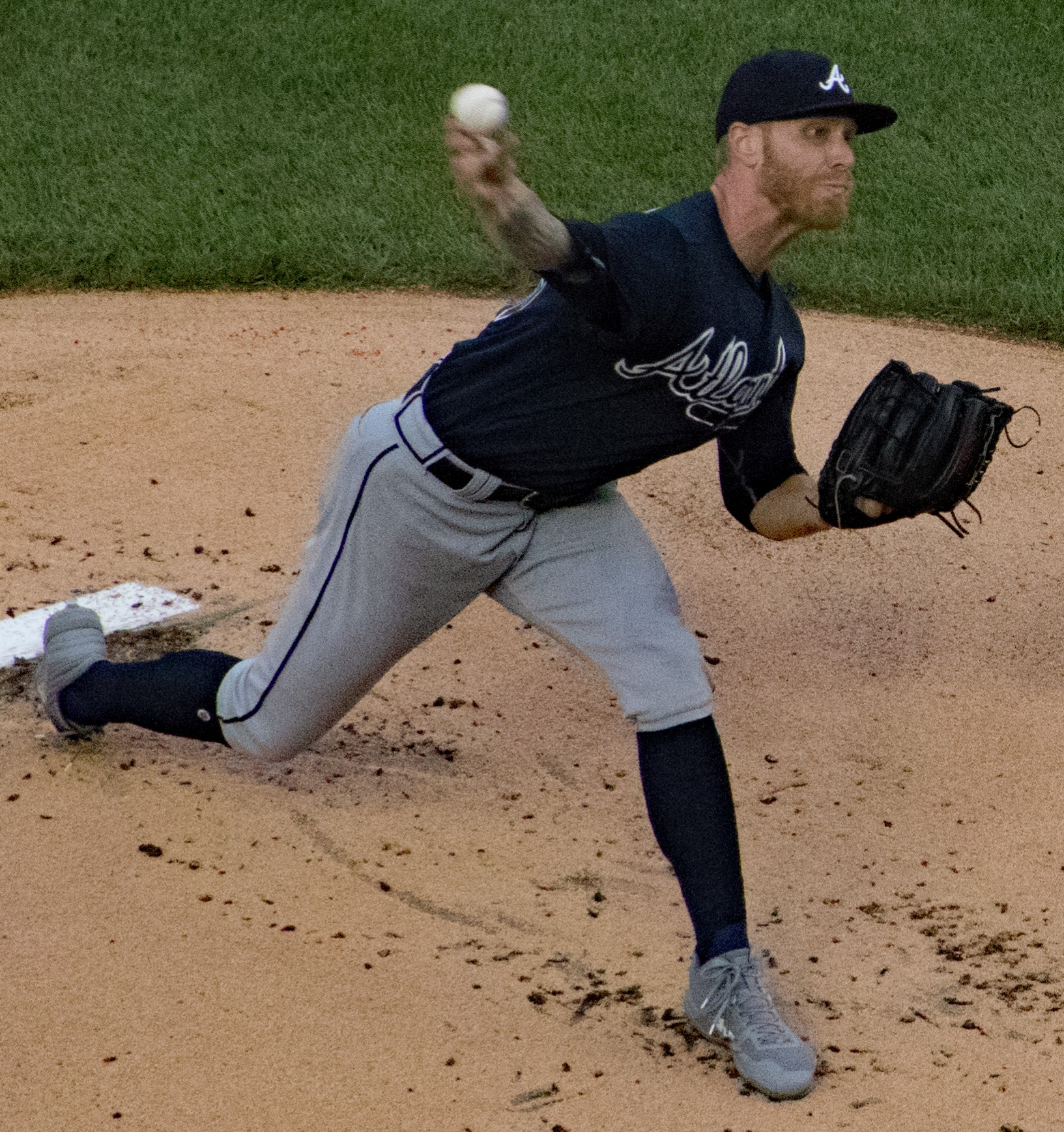
Foltynewicz pitching for the Braves during his all-star season in 2018

Foltynewicz was eligible for arbitration prior to the start of the 2018 season. He was awarded a $2.2 million salary. During spring training, Foltynewicz pitched primarily from a modified set position, to help mitigate struggles he had faced in previous seasons. On June 1, 2018, Foltynewicz pitched his first career complete game and shutout against the Washington Nationals. He struck out eleven batters and walked two. He was named to the 2018 MLB All-Star Game after owning a 6–5 record and a 2.37 ERA over his first 17 starts of the season. Foltynewicz made his final start of the 2018 season against the Philadelphia Phillies on September 28. He pitched five innings and struck out nine batters, becoming the first Braves pitcher since Javier Vázquez in 2009 to strike out 200 batters in a season. Foltynewicz started game one of the 2018 National League Division Series against the Los Angeles Dodgers. He pitched two innings, yielding four runs on three hits and striking out five batters while walking three. He returned to start the fourth game of the series, allowing one run in four innings pitched.

Foltynewicz and the Braves agreed to a one-year contract worth $5.475 million for 2019 without going to arbitration. Due to his marked improvement in 2018, Foltynewicz was regarded as the Braves' ace to start the 2019 season. After a single start in spring training, Foltynewicz reported elbow discomfort. Foltynewicz's recovery took place slowly throughout March, without setbacks. Due to the elbow injury, Foltynewicz was unable to make the Braves' Opening Day start in 2019, which instead went to Julio Teherán. Foltynewicz was sent to Triple-A for rehabilitation, where he started the Gwinnett Stripers' first game of 2019, pitching five no-hit innings. Foltynewicz returned from the injured list on April 27, 2019, and made his season debut against the Colorado Rockies. He was optioned to the Gwinnett Stripers on June 23 after pitching to a 2–5 record with a 6.37 ERA over 11 starts. On August 6, Foltynewicz replaced Kevin Gausman in the starting rotation and faced the Minnesota Twins. He pitched into the sixth inning, and the Braves won the game 12–7. From his return in August to the end of the regular season, Foltynewicz made ten starts, with a 2.65 ERA. He pitched in two games against the St. Louis Cardinals in the 2019 National League Division Series, winning game two, and losing game five.

Prior to the 2020 season, Foltynewicz and the Braves agreed to a one-year contract worth $6.425 million, without utilizing the salary arbitration process. Foltynewicz struggled in his first start of 2020 against the Tampa Bay Rays, giving up six runs, including back-to-back home runs to Hunter Renfroe and Joey Wendle, in three innings of work. Following the game, the Braves designated Foltynewicz for assignment, as he was out of minor league options. Subsequently, on July 30, Foltynewicz was outrighted. He became a free agent on November 2, 2020.

=== Texas Rangers ===
On February 10, 2021, Foltynewicz agreed to a one-year, $2 million contract with the Texas Rangers. With Texas in 2021, he posted a 2–12 record with a 5.44 ERA and 97 strikeouts over 139 innings pitched. On October 9, Foltynewicz elected free agency.

== Personal life ==
During the 2017 season, Foltynewicz began holding Folty's Fridays, a community outreach initiative meant to engage children.

He is married to Brittany Wortmann. The couple's first child, a son, was born in February 2018. In 2022, Wortmann accused Foltynewicz of domestic abuse and adultery and said that she and Foltynewicz were separating.
