= Andrew Thurman =

American baseball player (born 1991)

Free agent
- Pitcher
- Born: December 10, 1991 (age 34); Orange, California, U.S.
- Bats: Right Throws: Right
- Stats at Baseball Reference

Andrew M. Thurman (born December 10, 1991) is an American professional baseball pitcher who is a free agent.

== Career ==
Thurman attended Orange Lutheran High School in Orange, California, and played for the school's baseball team. He enrolled at the University of California, Irvine where he played college baseball for the UC Irvine Anteaters. In 2011 and 2012, he played collegiate summer baseball with the Yarmouth–Dennis Red Sox of the Cape Cod Baseball League.

=== Houston Astros ===
The Houston Astros selected Thurman in the second round, with the 40th overall selection, of the 2013 Major League Baseball draft. Thurman signed with the Astros, receiving a $1.4 million signing bonus.

Thurman made his professional debut with the Tri-City ValleyCats of the Low–A New York–Penn League after he signed. In 2014, he played for the Quad Cities River Bandits of the Single–A Midwest League.

=== Atlanta Braves ===
The Astros traded Thurman, Mike Foltynewicz, and Rio Ruiz to the Atlanta Braves in exchange for Evan Gattis and James Hoyt on January 14, 2015. Thurman began the 2015 season with the Carolina Mudcats of the High–A Carolina League, but went on the disabled list after the Mudcats' team bus flipped over on May 12. He missed two months of the season. Thurman began the 2016 season with the Mississippi Braves of the Double–A Southern League. He was demoted to Carolina on July 20, and released on August 18.

=== Los Angeles Dodgers ===
Thurman signed a minor league contract with the Los Angeles Dodgers on December 24, 2016. He appeared in 17 games between the Single–A Rancho Cucamonga Quakes and Double-A Tulsa Drillers and was 2–1 with a 1.91 ERA and 26 strikeouts in 33 innings of work. He elected free agency following the season on November 6, 2017.

On April 19, 2018, Thurman signed with the Sioux City Explorers of the American Association of Professional Baseball. He was released prior to start of the season on May 15.

=== Southern Maryland Blue Crabs ===
On March 16, 2025, after seven years of inactivity, Thurman signed with the Southern Maryland Blue Crabs of the Atlantic League of Professional Baseball. Thurman made 25 starts for the Blue Crabs, compiling a 7–2 record and 4.94 ERA with 128 strikeouts across 125 2/3 innings pitched.

=== San Diego Padres ===
On January 27, 2026, Thurman signed a minor league contract with the San Diego Padres organization. He made 30 appearances (including eight starts) split between the Double–A San Antonio Missions and Triple–A El Paso Chihuahuas, posting a cumulative 2–7 record and 6.85 ERA with 67 strikeouts over 71 innings of work. Thurman was released by the Padres organization on August 22.
