= James Hoyt (baseball) =

American baseball player (born 1986)

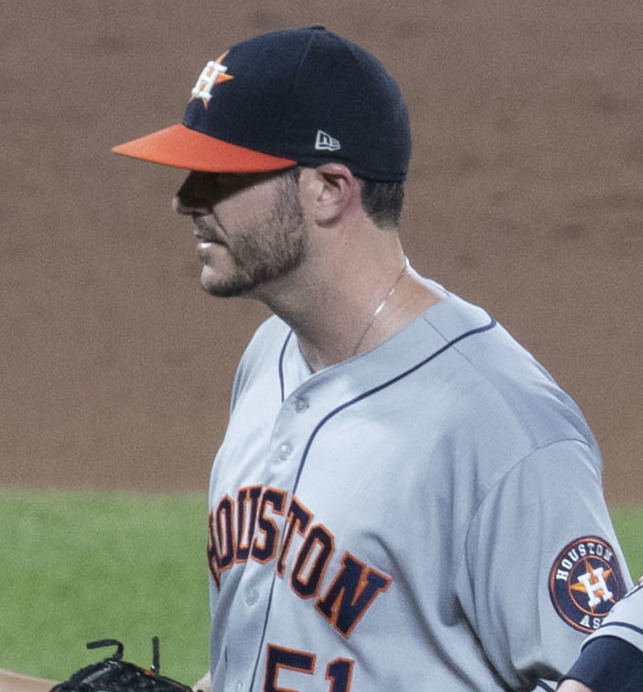
- Hoyt with the Houston Astros
- Pitcher
- Born: September 30, 1986 (age 39); Boise, Idaho, U.S.
- Batted: Right Threw: Right

MLB debut
- August 3, 2016, for the Houston Astros

Last MLB appearance
- August 26, 2021, for the Los Angeles Angels

MLB statistics
- Win–loss record: 4–1
- Earned run average: 3.94
- Strikeouts: 135
- Stats at Baseball Reference

Teams
- Houston Astros (2016–2018); Cleveland Indians (2019); Miami Marlins (2020); Los Angeles Angels (2021)

James Allen Hoyt (born September 30, 1986) is an American former professional baseball pitcher. He played in Major League Baseball (MLB) for the Houston Astros, Cleveland Indians, Miami Marlins, and Los Angeles Angels from 2016 to 2021.

== Career ==
=== Yuma Scorpions ===
After graduating from Boise High School, Hoyt played college baseball at Palomar College before transferring to Centenary College of Louisiana. In 2011, he signed with the Yuma Scorpions of the North American League (NABL) after a tryout with the team. The 2011 Yuma Scorpions included former and future major league players such as Willy Aybar, Chris Britton, Joey Gathright, Luis Ugueto, Tony Phillips, Robby Scott, Franklyn Gracesqui, Ozzie Canseco and Jose Canseco, who served as the team's manager as well as a player for the club.

=== Edinburg Roadrunners ===
After the Scorpions folded, he went on to pitch for the Edinburg Roadrunners of the North Atlantic Baseball League. In 12 games for Edinburg, Hoyt pitched to a 1.04 ERA with 19 strikeouts in 17 1/3 innings pitched.

=== Wichita Wingnuts/Olmecas de Tabasco ===
Hoyt then signed with the Wichita Wingnuts of the American Association. On June 30, 2012, Hoyt signed with the Olmecas de Tabasco of the Mexican League. In 11 games for Tabasco, Hoyt notched a 2.03 ERA with 20 strikeouts in 13 1/3 innings pitched in 11 games. Hoyt returned to Wichita in August 2012 and finished the season with the club. Pitching for Wichita, Hoyt pitched to a 2.61 ERA with 15 strikeouts in 10 1/3 innings pitched over 11 appearances.

=== Atlanta Braves ===
While pitching for Tabasco, Hoyt impressed Atlanta Braves scouts and they signed him to a minor league contract on November 15, 2012.

Hoyt started his career in the Braves organization with the Lynchburg Hillcats of the High–A Carolina League in 2013. He was later promoted to the Mississippi Braves of the Double–A Southern League. Hoyt started 2014 back with Mississippi and in June he was promoted to the Gwinnett Braves of the Triple–A International League.

=== Houston Astros ===
On January 14, 2015, Hoyt along with Evan Gattis was traded to the Houston Astros in exchange for Rio Ruiz, Andrew Thurman, and Mike Foltynewicz.

On August 2, 2016, the Astros promoted Hoyt to the major leagues.

On March 31, 2017, he was optioned to the Fresno Grizzlies of the Triple–A Pacific Coast League. On April 20, the Astros promoted Hoyt to the major leagues. Hoyt made 32 appearances out of the bullpen for the Astros in 2017, finishing with a 1–0 record and a 4.38 ERA. The Astros finished the season with a 101–61 record for an AL West pennant, and eventually won the 2017 World Series. Hoyt did not participate in the playoff run, but was still on the team's 40-man roster at the time, declaring him eligible for his first career World Series title.

=== Cleveland Indians ===
On July 6, 2018, Hoyt was traded to the Cleveland Indians for minor league righthanded pitcher Tommy DeJuneas.

The Indians declined to tender Hoyt a major league contract for the 2019 season by the November 30, 2018 deadline, making Hoyt a free agent. The Indians re-signed Hoyt to a minor league contract on December 1, 2018. On September 1, 2019, the Indians selected Hoyt's contract. Hoyt was designated for assignment on December 2. On December 4, Hoyt re-signed with Cleveland on a major league contract. The Indians designated Hoyt for assignment on July 28, 2020.

=== Miami Marlins ===
Hoyt was traded by the Indians to the Miami Marlins on August 1, 2020, in exchange for cash considerations. In the pandemic shortened season, Hoyt pitched to a 1.23 ERA with 20 strikeouts and only 2 earned runs on 9 hits in 14 2/3 innings pitched across 24 games.

=== Los Angeles Angels ===
On March 29, 2021, Hoyt was traded to the Los Angeles Angels in exchange for cash considerations. Hoyt registered a 6.75 ERA in 9 appearances with the Angels in 2021. On October 22, Hoyt was outrighted off of the 40-man roster. He elected free agency on November 7.

=== Lancaster Stormers ===
On February 12, 2024, Hoyt signed with the Leones de Yucatán of the Mexican League. However, Hoyt did not play for Yucátan and signed with the Lancaster Stormers of the Atlantic League of Professional Baseball on April 17. In 26 appearances for Lancaster, he struggled to a 6.38 ERA with 21 strikeouts and 3 saves across 24 innings pitched. On July 23, Hoyt retired from professional baseball.

=== Piratas de Campeche ===
On January 20, 2025, Hoyt came out of retirement and signed with the Piratas de Campeche of the Mexican League. In 33 appearances for the Piratas, he accumulated a 3-2 record and 4.76 ERA with 20 strikeouts across 28 1/3 innings pitched. On April 10, 2026, Hoyt was released by Campeche.

=== High Point Rockers ===
On April 20, 2026, Hoyt signed with the Kansas City Monarchs of the American Association of Professional Baseball. However, on May 12, he was traded to the High Point Rockers of the Atlantic League of Professional Baseball. In six appearances for the Rockers, Hoyt logged an 0–1 record and 3.00 ERA with three strikeouts over six innings of work. On June 6, Hoyt retired from professional baseball.
