= 2017 Los Angeles Angels season =

Major League Baseball season

2017 Los Angeles Angels
- League: American League
- Division: West
- Ballpark: Angel Stadium
- City: Anaheim, California
- Record: 80–82 (.494)
- Divisional place: 2nd
- Owner: Arte Moreno
- Manager: Mike Scioscia
- Television: Fox Sports West (Victor Rojas, Mark Gubicza)
- Radio: KLAA (AM 830) KSPN (AM 710) (Terry Smith, Mark Langston, José Mota) Spanish: KWKW (AM 1330)
- Stats: ESPN.com; Baseball Reference

The 2017 Los Angeles Angels season was the 57th season of the Angels franchise and the 52nd in Anaheim (all of them at Angel Stadium). The Angels began the season on April 3 against the Oakland Athletics and finished the season on October 1 against the Seattle Mariners. They improved upon their record from last season, but still failed to make the playoffs for the third consecutive season, finishing 5 games behind the Minnesota Twins for the second wild card spot.

== Offseason and spring training ==
In the first trade of the MLB offseason on November 3, 2016, the Angels acquired Cameron Maybin for Minor League pitcher Victor Alcantara. Jesse Chavez signed with the team on November 12. On December 10, the Angels traded Minor League pitchers Austin Adams and Kyle McGowin to the Washington Nationals for infielder Danny Espinosa. The Milwaukee Brewers sent catcher Martin Maldonado to the Angels for Jett Bandy on December 13. The Angels then signed Ben Revere, an outfielder, on December 23. The Angels' first signing of 2017 was infielder Luis Valbuena, formerly of the Houston Astros, who signed a 2-year, $15 million deal on January 24. On February 4, first baseman Dustin Ackley was signed to a minor league contract with an offer to attend spring training. Pitcher Yusmeiro Petit also inked a minor league deal with a spring training invitation days later; he went on to make the Opening Day roster.

The Angels ended spring training with a 21–14 win–loss record, excluding a tie game that did not count toward the standings. Their .600 winning percentage was the best in the Cactus League.

== Regular season ==
=== Season standings ===
==== American League West ====
AL West
Team	W	L	Pct.	GB	Home	Road
Houston Astros	101	61	.623	—	48‍–‍33	53‍–‍28
Los Angeles Angels	80	82	.494	21	43‍–‍38	37‍–‍44
Seattle Mariners	78	84	.481	23	40‍–‍41	38‍–‍43
Texas Rangers	78	84	.481	23	41‍–‍40	37‍–‍44
Oakland Athletics	75	87	.463	26	46‍–‍35	29‍–‍52

==== American League leaders ====
Division leaders
Team	W	L	Pct.
Cleveland Indians	102	60	.630
Houston Astros	101	61	.623
Boston Red Sox	93	69	.574

Wild Card teams (Top 2 teams qualify for postseason)
Team	W	L	Pct.	GB
New York Yankees	91	71	.562	+6
Minnesota Twins	85	77	.525	—
Kansas City Royals	80	82	.494	5
Los Angeles Angels	80	82	.494	5
Tampa Bay Rays	80	82	.494	5
Seattle Mariners	78	84	.481	7
Texas Rangers	78	84	.481	7
Toronto Blue Jays	76	86	.469	9
Baltimore Orioles	75	87	.463	10
Oakland Athletics	75	87	.463	10
Chicago White Sox	67	95	.414	18
Detroit Tigers	64	98	.395	21

==== Record against opponents ====
2017 American League record Source: MLB Standings Grid – 2017
Team	BAL	BOS	CWS	CLE	DET	HOU	KC	LAA	MIN	NYY	OAK	SEA	TB	TEX	TOR	NL
Baltimore	—	10–9	4–3	1–6	3–4	1–5	3–3	2–4	2–5	7–12	4–3	4–2	8–11	6–1	12–7	8–12
Boston	9–10	—	6–1	4–3	3–4	3–4	2–4	2–4	5–2	8–11	3–4	3–3	11–8	5–1	13–6	16–4
Chicago	3–4	1–6	—	6–13	10–9	4–2	10–9	3–4	7–12	3–4	1–5	3–4	3–3	4–3	3–3	6–14
Cleveland	6–1	3–4	13–6	—	13–6	5–1	12–7	6–0	12–7	5–2	3–4	4–2	4–3	6–1	4–2	6–14
Detroit	4–3	4–3	9–10	6–13	—	3–4	8–11	3–4	8–11	3–3	1–5	1–6	2–5	1–5	3–3	8–12
Houston	5–1	4–3	2–4	1–5	4–3	—	3–4	12–7	5–1	5–2	12–7	14–5	3–4	12–7	4–3	15–5
Kansas City	3–3	4–2	9–10	7–12	11–8	4–3	—	6–1	8–11	2–5	3–3	5–2	4–3	1–6	3–3	9–11
Los Angeles	4–2	4–2	4–3	0–6	4–3	7–12	1–6	—	2–5	4–2	12–7	12–7	3–4	8–11	4–3	11–9
Minnesota	5–2	2–5	12–7	7–12	11–8	1–5	11–8	5–2	—	2–4	3–3	3–4	2–4	4–3	4–3	13–7
New York	12–7	11–8	4–3	2–5	3–3	2–5	5–2	2–4	4–2	—	2–5	5–2	12–7	3–3	9–10	15–5
Oakland	3–4	4–3	5–1	4–3	5–1	7–12	3–3	7–12	3–3	5–2	—	7–12	2–5	10–9	2–5	7–13
Seattle	2–4	3–3	4–3	2–4	6–1	5–14	2–5	7–12	4–3	2–5	12–7	—	5–1	11–8	1–6	12–8
Tampa Bay	11–8	8–11	3–3	3–4	5–2	4–3	3–4	4–3	4–2	7–12	5–2	1–5	—	2–4	9–10	11–9
Texas	1–6	1–5	3–4	1–6	5–1	7–12	6–1	11–8	3–4	3–3	9–10	8–11	4–2	—	3–4	14–6
Toronto	7–12	6–13	3–3	2–4	3–3	3–4	3–3	3–4	3–4	10–9	5–2	6–1	10–9	4–3	—	9–11

== Game log ==
2017 Game Log: 80–82 (Home: 43–38; Away: 37–44)
April: 14–13 (Home: 9–4; Away: 5–9)

#	Date	Opponent	Score	Win	Loss	Save	Attendance	Record	Streak
1	April 3	@ A's	2–4	Graveman (1–0)	**Nolasco** (0–1)	Casilla (1)	36,067	0–1	L1
2	April 4	@ A's	7–6	**Bailey** (1–0)	Dull (0–1)	**Bedrosian** (1)	11,225	1–1	W1
3	April 5	@ A's	5–0	**Ramirez** (1–0)	Cotton (0–1)	—	13,405	2–1	W2
4	April 6	@ A's	1–5	Triggs (1–0)	**Skaggs** (0–1)	—	13,292	2–2	L1
5	April 7	Mariners	5–1	**Chavez** (1–0)	Gallardo (0–1)	—	43,911	3–2	W1
6	April 8	Mariners	5–4	**Ramírez** (2–0)	Scribner (0–1)	**Bedrosian** (2)	42,668	4–2	W2
7	April 9	Mariners	10–9	**Bailey** (2–0)	Díaz (0–1)	—	37,175	5–2	W3
8	April 11	Rangers	6–5 (10)	**Bedrosian** (1–0)	Jeffress (0–1)	—	34,044	6–2	W4
9	April 12	Rangers	3–8	Griffin (1–0)	**Chavez** (1–1)	Leclerc (1)	34,599	6–3	L1
10	April 13	Rangers	3–8	Darvish (1–1)	**Nolasco** (0–2)	—	30,255	6–4	L2
11	April 14	@ Royals	1–7	Duffy (2–0)	**Ramírez** (2–1)	—	26,838	6–5	L3
12	April 15	@ Royals	2–3	Soria (1–0)	**Alvarez** (1–0)	—	24,162	6–6	L4
13	April 16	@ Royals	0–1	Herrera (1–0)	**Parker** (0–1)	—	27,950	6–7	L5
14	April 17	@ Astros	0–3	Morton (1–1)	**Chavez** (1–2)	Giles (3)	23,501	6–8	L6
15	April 18	@ Astros	5–2	**Nolasco** (1–2)	Musgrove (1–1)	**Bedrosian** (3)	21,760	7–8	W1
16	April 19	@ Astros	1–5	Keuchel (3–0)	**Ramírez** (2–2)	—	24,028	7–9	L1
17	April 20	@ Astros	1–2	McCullers (2–0)	**Shoemaker** (0–1)	Devenski (1)	23,173	7–10	L2
18	April 21	Blue Jays	7–8 (13)	Tepera (1–0)	**Chavez** (1–3)	Biagini (1)	40,176	7–11	L3
19	April 22	Blue Jays	5–4	**Skaggs** (1–1)	Lawrence (0–2)	**Norris** (1)	41,345	8–11	W1
20	April 23	Blue Jays	2–6	Stroman (2–2)	**Guerra** (0–1)	—	35,034	8–12	L1
21	April 24	Blue Jays	2–1	**Chavez** (2–3)	Liriano (1–2)	**Norris** (2)	25,304	9–12	W1
22	April 25	A's	2–1 (11)	**Pounders** (1–0)	Madson (0–2)	—	30,124	10–12	W2
23	April 26	A's	8–5	**Shoemaker** (1–1)	Manaea (1–2)	**Norris** (3)	30,248	11–12	W3
24	April 27	A's	2–1	**Nolasco** (2–2)	Graveman (2–1)	**Norris** (4)	37,603	12–12	W4
25	April 28	@ Rangers	6–3	**Guerra** (1–1)	Jeffress (0–2)	**Alvarez** (1)	28,968	13–12	W5
26	April 29	@ Rangers	3–6	Darvish (3–2)	**Chavez** (2–4)	—	44,597	13–13	L1
27	April 30	@ Rangers	5–2	**Ramírez** (3–2)	Perez (1–4)	**Norris** (5)	38,804	14–13	W1

May: 14–15 (Home: 8–5; Away: 6–10)

#	Date	Opponent	Score	Win	Loss	Save	Attendance	Record	Streak
28	May 2	@ Mariners	6–4 (11)	**Guerra** (2–1)	Pazos (0–1)	—	15,080	15–13	W2
29	May 3	@ Mariners	7–8	Machi (1–0)	**Parker** (0–2)	Díaz (5)	13,799	15–14	L1
30	May 4	@ Mariners	1–3	Miranda (3–2)	**Meyer** (0–1)	—	15,915	15–15	L2
31	May 5	Astros	6–7 (10)	Giles (1–1)	**Norris** (0–1)	Devenski (2)	34,556	15–16	L3
32	May 6	Astros	2–1	**Norris** (1–1)	Devenski (2–2)	—	41,097	16–16	W1
33	May 7	Astros	3–5	Fiers (1–1)	**Shoemaker** (1–2)	Giles (8)	38,383	16–17	L1
34	May 8	@ A's	2–3	Hendriks (1–0)	**Guerra** (2–2)	—	10,292	16–18	L2
35	May 9	@ A's	7–3	**Meyer** (1–1)	Cotton (3–4)	**Norris** (6)	11,383	17–18	W1
36	May 10	@ A's	1–3	Triggs (5–2)	**Chavez** (2–5)	Casilla (6)	11,061	17–19	L1
37	May 11	Tigers	1–7	Fulmer (4–1)	**Ramírez** (3–3)	—	30,207	17–20	L2
38	May 12	Tigers	7–0	**Shoemaker** (2–2)	Zimmermann (3–2)	—	44,311	18–20	W1
39	May 13	Tigers	3–4	A. Wilson (0–1)	**Norris** (2–1)	J. Wilson (2)	40,251	18–21	L1
40	May 14	Tigers	4–1	**Meyer** (2–1)	Verlander (3–2)	**Norris** (7)	36,215	19–21	W1
41	May 15	White Sox	5–3	**Chavez** (3–5)	Pelfrey (0–4)	**Norris** (8)	29,445	20–21	W2
42	May 16	White Sox	7–6 (11)	**Petit** (1–0)	Robertson (2–1)	—	36,089	21–21	W3
43	May 17	White Sox	12–8	**Shoemaker** (3–2)	González (3–4)	—	33,234	22–21	W4
44	May 19	@ Mets	0–3	deGrom (3–1)	**Nolasco** (2–3)	Reed (5)	36,542	22–22	L1
45	May 20	@ Mets	5–7	Wheeler (3–2)	**Meyer** (2–2)	Reed (6)	37,264	22–23	L2
46	May 21	@ Mets	12–5	**Chavez** (4–5)	Milone (1–2)	—	39,501	23–23	W1
47	May 22	@ Rays	3–2	**Ramírez** (4–3)	Díaz (0–3)	**Norris** (9)	12,249	24–23	W2
48	May 23	@ Rays	4–0	**Shoemaker** (4–2)	Cobb (4–4)	—	9,014	25–23	W3
49	May 24	@ Rays	2–5	Ramirez (3–0)	**Nolasco** (2–4)	Colomé (12)	9,975	25–24	L1
50	May 25	@ Rays	0–4	Andriese (5–1)	**Wright** (0–1)	—	9,459	25–25	L2
51	May 26	@ Marlins	5–8	Straily (3–3)	**Chavez** (4–6)	Ramos (5)	18,346	25–26	L3
52	May 27	@ Marlins	5–2	**Ramirez** (5–3)	Worley (0–2)	—	19,366	26–26	W1
53	May 28	@ Marlins	2–9	Urena (3–2)	**Shoemaker** (4–3)	—	20,444	26–27	L1
54	May 29	Braves	3–6	Teherán (4–4)	**Nolasco** (2–5)	Johnson (11)	37,891	26–28	L2
55	May 30	Braves	9–3	**Bridwell** (1–0)	Colón (2–6)	—	32,028	27–28	W1
56	May 31	Braves	2–1	**Parker** (1–2)	Vizcaíno (2–2)	**Norris** (10)	35,795	28–28	W2

June: 14–14 (Home: 5–9; Away: 9–5)

#	Date	Opponent	Score	Win	Loss	Save	Attendance	Record	Streak
57	June 1	Twins	2–4	Rogers (3–1)	**Alvarez** (0–2)	Kintzler (14)	33,426	28–29	L1
58	June 2	Twins	5–11	Gibson (2–4)	**Ramirez** (5–4)	—	39,042	28–30	L2
59	June 3	Twins	7–2	**Shoemaker** (5–3)	Santana (7–3)	—	40,236	29–30	W1
60	June 4	Twins	2-3	Berríos (4–1)	**Nolasco** (2–6)	Kintzler (15)	39,701	29–31	L1
61	June 6	@ Tigers	5–3	**Chavez** (5–6)	Norris (2–4)	**Norris** (11)	24,175	30–31	W1
62	June 7	@ Tigers	0–4	Farmer (2–0)	**Meyer** (2–3)	—	24,958	30–32	L1
63	June 8	@ Tigers	11–4	**Ramirez** (6–4)	Fulmer (6–4)	—	34,810	31–32	W1
64	June 9	@ Astros	9–4	**Shoemaker** (6–3)	Peacock (3–1)	—	40,786	32–32	W2
65	June 10	@ Astros	1–3	Fiers (4–2)	**Nolasco** (2–7)	Giles (16)	41,296	32–33	L1
66	June 11	@ Astros	12–6	**Middleton** (1–0)	Feliz (2–1)	—	32,425	33–33	W1
67	June 12	Yankees	3–5	Clippard (1–3)	**Álvarez** (0–3)	Betances (6)	36,245	33–34	L1
68	June 13	Yankees	3–2 (11)	**Middleton** (2–0)	Shreve (1–1)	—	33,159	34–34	W1
69	June 14	Yankees	7–5	**Parker** (2–2)	Herrera (0–1)	**Hernandez** (1)	43,851	35–34	W2
70	June 15	Royals	2–7	Strahm (2–3)	**Nolasco** (2–8)	—	34,884	35–35	L1
71	June 16	Royals	1–3	Kennedy (1–6)	**Chavez** (5–7)	Herrera (14)	34,184	35–36	L2
72	June 17	Royals	9–0	**Meyer** (3–3)	Junis (2–1)	—	41,209	36–36	W1
73	June 18	Royals	3–7	Vargas (10–3)	**Ramirez** (6–5)	—	40,178	36–37	L1
74	June 20	@ Yankees	8–3	**Parker** (3–2)	Clippard (1–4)	—	39,853	37–37	W1
75	June 21	@ Yankees	4–8	Montgomery (5–4)	**Nolasco** (2–9)	—	39,911	37–38	L1
76	June 22	@ Yankees	10–5	**Petit** (2–0)	Severino (5–3)	—	43,051	38–38	W1
77	June 23	@ Red Sox	4–9	Porcello (4–9)	**Meyer** (3–4)	—	37,034	38–39	L1
78	June 24	@ Red Sox	6–3	**Ramirez** (7–5)	Price (2–2)	**Parker** (1)	36,868	39–39	W1
79	June 25	@ Red Sox	4–2	**Bridwell** (2–0)	Fister (0–1)	**Petit** (1)	36,474	40–39	W2
80	June 26	@ Dodgers	4–0	**Nolasco** (3–9)	Hill (4–4)	—	43,126	41–39	W3
81	June 27	@ Dodgers	0–4	Maeda (6–3)	**Chavez** (5–8)	—	47,245	41–40	L1
82	June 28	Dodgers	3–2	**Bedrosian** (2–0)	Báez (2–1)	—	44,669	42–40	W1
83	June 29	Dodgers	2–6	Kershaw (12–2)	**Ramírez** (7–6)	Jansen (18)	44,807	42–41	L1
84	June 30	Mariners	0–10	Miranda (7–4)	**Bridwell** (2–1)	—	40,059	42–42	L2

July: 9–13 (Home: 5–5; Away: 4–8)

#	Date	Opponent	Score	Win	Loss	Save	Attendance	Record	Streak
85	July 1	Mariners	4–0	**Nolasco** (4–9)	Gaviglio (3–3)	—	44,644	43–42	W1
86	July 2	Mariners	3–5	Paxton (5–3)	**Chavez** (5–9)	Díaz (13)	39,279	43–43	L1
87	July 3	@ Twins	2–6	Mejía (4–3)	**Meyer** (3–5)	—	36,182	43–44	L2
88	July 4	@ Twins	4–5	Gibson (5–6)	**Ramirez** (7–7)	Kintzler (22)	25,013	43–45	L3
89	July 5	@ Twins	2–1	**Bridwell** (3–1)	Santana (10–6)	**Norris** (12)	19,106	44–45	W1
90	July 7	@ Rangers	0–10	Hamels (4–0)	**Nolasco** (4–10)	—	40,276	44–46	L1
91	July 8	@ Rangers	2–5	Ross (2–1)	**Chavez** (5–10)	—	36,817	44–47	L2
92	July 9	@ Rangers	3–0	**Ramirez** (8–7)	Darvish (6–8)	**Norris** (13)	28,384	45–47	W1
**88th All-Star Game in Miami, Florida**
93	July 14	Rays	1–2 (10)	Boxberger (2–1)	**Bedrosian** (2–1)	Colomé (26)	38,119	45–48	L1
94	July 15	Rays	3–6	Cobb (8–6)	**Ramírez** (8–8)	—	38,515	45–49	L2
95	July 16	Rays	4–3	**Hernandez** (1–0)	Diaz (1–4)	**Norris** (14)	36,178	46–49	W1
96	July 18	Nationals	3–4	Jackson (1–0)	**Bedrosian** (2–2)	Doolittle (4)	43,345	46–50	L1
97	July 19	Nationals	7–0	**Meyer** (4–5)	Gonzalez (8–5)	—	41,065	47–50	W1
98	July 21	Red Sox	2–6	Sale (12–4)	**Nolasco** (4–11)	–	37,714	47–51	L1
99	July 22	Red Sox	7–3	**Ramirez** (9–8)	Price (5–3)	—	43,829	48–51	W1
100	July 23	Red Sox	3–2	**Bridwell** (4–1)	Porcello (4–13)	**Norris** (15)	40,471	49–51	W2
101	July 25	@ Indians	7–11 (11)	Otero (2–0)	**Norris** (1–3)	—	22,364	49–52	L1
102	July 26	@ Indians	4–10	Shaw (4–4)	**Nolasco** (4–12)	—	22,658	49–53	L2
103	July 27	@ Indians	1–2	Bauer (9–8)	**Ramírez** (9–9)	Allen (18)	28,083	49–54	L3
104	July 28	@ Blue Jays	7–2	**Bridwell** (5–1)	Happ (3–8)	—	39,828	50–54	W1
105	July 29	@ Blue Jays	6–5	**Scribner** (1–0)	Osuna (3–1)	**Norris** (16)	46,502	51–54	W2
106	July 30	@ Blue Jays	10–11	Dermody (1–0)	**Norris** (1–4)	—	46,852	51–55	L1

August: 18–10 (Home: 11–8; Away: 7–2)

#	Date	Opponent	Score	Win	Loss	Save	Attendance	Record	Streak
107	August 1	Phillies	7–1	**Nolasco** (5–12)	Nola (8–7)	—	36,344	52–55	W1
108	August 2	Phillies	7–0	**Ramirez** (10–9)	Thompson (1–1)	—	34,623	53–55	W2
109	August 3	Phillies	5–4	**Petit** (3–0)	García (1–2)	**Norris** (17)	34,710	54–55	W3
110	August 4	A's	8–6	**Chavez** (6–10)	Coulombe (2–2)	**Norris** (18)	43,330	55–55	W4
111	August 5	A's	0–5	Blackburn (3–1)	**Skaggs** (1–2)	—	39,180	55–56	L1
112	August 6	A's	10–11	Smith (2–0)	**Norris** (1–5)	Treinen (5)	38,278	55–57	L2
113	August 7	Orioles	2–6	Bundy (11–8)	**Ramirez** (10–10)	—	34,142	55–58	L3
114	August 8	Orioles	3–2	**Bridwell** (6–1)	Hellickson (7–6)	**Middleton** (1)	35,723	56–58	W1
115	August 9	Orioles	5–1	**Scribner** (2–0)	Gausman (8–8)	—	36,202	57–58	W2
116	August 10	@ Mariners	6–3	**Norris** (2–5)	Diaz (2–5)	**Bedrosian** (4)	35,021	58–58	W3
117	August 11	@ Mariners	6–5	**Middleton** (3–0)	Pazos (3–4)	**Petit** (2)	38,206	59–58	W4
118	August 12	@ Mariners	6–3	**Middleton** (4–0)	Zych (5–3)	**Bedrosian** (5)	45,388	60–58	W5
119	August 13	@ Mariners	4–2	**Bridwell** (7–1)	Miranda (7–6)	**Middleton** (2)	43,199	61–58	W6
120	August 15	@ Nationals	1–3	González (11–5)	**Skaggs** (1–3)	Doolittle (12)	32,355	61–59	L1
121	August 16	@ Nationals	3–2	**Nolasco** (6–12)	Roark (9–8)	**Bedrosian** (6)	30,307	62–59	W1
122	August 18	@ Orioles	7–9	O'Day (1–3)	**Middleton** (4–1)	—	26,185	62–60	L1
123	August 19	@ Orioles	5–1	**Ramirez** (11–10)	Gausman (9–9)	—	43,929	63–60	W1
124	August 20	@ Orioles	5–4	**Bedrosian** (3–2)	Brach (3–3)	**Norris** (19)	24,715	64–60	W2
125	August 21	Rangers	3–5	Hamels (9–1)	**Skaggs** (1–4)	Claudio (7)	35,204	64–61	L1
126	August 22	Rangers	10–1	**Middleton** (5–1)	Ross (3–3)	—	37,033	65–61	W1
127	August 23	Rangers	5–7	Claudio (3–1)	**Paredes** (0–1)	Barnette (1)	35,497	65–62	L1
128	August 24	Rangers	0–3	Pérez (9–10)	**Scribner** (2–1)	Rodriguez (1)	34,032	65–63	L2
129	August 25	Astros	1–2	McHugh (2–2)	**Bridwell** (7–2)	Giles (25)	42,333	65–64	L3
130	August 26	Astros	7–6	**Wood** (2–4)	Clippard (2–8)	**Parker** (2)	41,101	66–64	W1
131	August 27	Astros	5–7	Musgrove (6–8)	**Bedrosian** (3–3)	Giles (26)	37,606	66–65	L1
132	August 28	A's	3–1	**Heaney** (1–0)	Gossett (3–7)	**Parker** (3)	33,719	67–65	W1
133	August 29	A's	8–2	**Chavez** (7–10)	Smith (0–4)	—	36,229	68–65	W2
134	August 30	A's	10–8	**Bedrosian** (4–3)	Hatcher (0–2)	**Parker** (4)	36,022	69–65	W3

September/October: 11–17 (Home: 5–7; Away: 6–10)

#	Date	Opponent	Score	Win	Loss	Save	Attendance	Record	Streak
135	September 1	@ Rangers	9–10	Claudio (4–1)	**Bedrosian** (4–4)	—	32,240	69–66	L1
136	September 2	@ Rangers	7–4 (10)	**Petit** (4–0)	Leclerc (2–3)	**Parker** (5)	25,138	70–66	W1
137	September 3	@ Rangers	6–7	Perez (11–10)	**Heaney** (1–1)	Barnette (2)	28,783	70–67	L1
138	September 4	@ A's	11–9 (11)	**Salas** (1–0)	Treinen (1–5)	**Middleton** (3)	14,571	71–67	W1
139	September 5	@ A's	8–7 (10)	**Bedrosian** (5–4)	Treinen (1–6)	**Paredes** (1)	11,110	72–67	W2
140	September 6	@ A's	1–3	Manaea (10–9)	**Skaggs** (1–5)	Hatcher (1)	10,544	72–68	L1
141	September 8	@ Mariners	3–4	Leake (9–12)	**Nolasco** (6–13)	Díaz (32)	21,396	72–69	L2
142	September 9	@ Mariners	1–8	Albers (4–1)	**Heaney** (1–2)	—	26,248	72–70	L3
143	September 10	@ Mariners	5–3	**Bedrosian** (6–4)	Vincent (3–2)	**Petit** (3)	20,094	73–70	W1
144	September 12	Astros	0–1	Verlander (12–8)	**Richards** (0–1)	Giles (30)	36,088	73–71	L1
145	September 13	Astros	9–1	**Skaggs** (2–5)	Fiers (8–10)	—	33,899	74–71	W1
146	September 14	Astros	2–5	Peacock (11–2)	**Nolasco** (6–14)	—	35,715	74–72	L1
147	September 15	Rangers	7–6	**Petit** (5–0)	Mendez (0–1)	**Parker** (6)	41,409	75–72	W1
148	September 16	Rangers	2–0	**Bridwell** (8–2)	Hamels (10–4)	**Petit** (4)	40,719	76–72	W2
149	September 17	Rangers	2–4	González (8–11)	**Richards** (0–2)	Diekman (1)	36,709	76–73	L1
150	September 19	Indians	3–6	Clevinger (11–5)	**Skaggs** (2–6)	—	36,171	76–74	L2
151	September 20	Indians	5–6	Olson (1–0)	**Petit** (5–1)	Shaw (3)	38,424	76–75	L3
152	September 21	Indians	1–4	McAllister (2–2)	**Bridwell** (8–3)	Olson (1)	29,863	76–76	L4
153	September 22	@ Astros	0–3	Verlander (14–8)	**Petit** (5–2)	Giles (33) |	34,127	76–77	L5
154	September 23	@ Astros	2–6	Morton (13–7)	**Norris** (2–6)	—	34,035	76–78	L6
155	September 24	@ Astros	7–5	**Middleton** (6–1)	Devenski (8–5)	**Parker** (7)	36,756	77–78	W1
156	September 25	@ White Sox	2–4	Shields (5–7)	**Nolasco** (6–15)	Minaya (7)	13,443	77–79	L1
157	September 26	@ White Sox	9–3	**Bridwell** (9–3)	Volstad (1–1)	—	13,786	78–79	W1
158	September 27	@ White Sox	4–6 (10)	Farquhar (4–2)	**Parker** (3–3)	—	17,012	78–80	L1
159	September 28	@ White Sox	4–5	Infante (2–1)	**Chavez** (7–11)	Minaya (8)	19,596	78–81	L2
160	September 29	Mariners	6–5	**Wood** (3–4)	Rzepczynski (2–2)	**Parker** (8)	35,106	79–81	W1
161	September 30	Mariners	4–6	Lawrence (2–3)	**Bedrosian** (6–5)	Díaz (34)	38,075	79–82	L1
162	October 1	Mariners	6–2	**Bridwell** (10–3)	Simmons (0–2)	—	34,940	80–82	W1

Legend: = Win = Loss = Postponement
Bold = Angels team member

== Roster ==
2017 Los Angeles Angels
Roster
Pitchers: 48 José Álvarez; 37 Andrew Bailey; 32 Cam Bedrosian; 62 Parker Bridwell; 40 Jesse Chavez; 54 Deolis Guerra; 51 Jason Gurka; 28 Andrew Heaney; 33 David Hernandez; 68 Damien Magnifico; 23 Alex Meyer; 39 Keynan Middleton; 64 Mike Morin; 47 Ricky Nolasco; 20 Bud Norris; 60 Eduardo Paredes; 53 Blake Parker; 36 Yusmeiro Petit; 44,62 Brooks Pounders; 66 J. C. Ramírez; 65 Noe Ramirez; 43 Garrett Richards; 59 Fernando Salas; 38 Troy Scribner; 52 Matt Shoemaker; 45 Tyler Skaggs; 16 Huston Street; 38 José Valdez; 46 Blake Wood; 57 Daniel Wright; 39 Kirby Yates	Catchers: 13,59 Juan Graterol; 12 Martín Maldonado; 58 Carlos Pérez; Infielders: 22 Kaleb Cowart; 24 C. J. Cron; 0 Yunel Escobar; 3 Danny Espinosa; 49 Nolan Fontana; 13 Nick Franklin; 19 Jefry Marté; 7 Cliff Pennington; 4 Brandon Phillips; 5 Albert Pujols; 2 Andrelton Simmons; 18 Luis Valbuena	Outfielders: 56 Kole Calhoun; 33 Ramón Flores; 9 Cameron Maybin; 65 Cesar Puello; 25 Ben Revere; 17 Shane Robinson; 27 Mike Trout; 9 Justin Upton; 8 Eric Young	Manager: 14 Mike Scioscia; Coaches: 63 Scott Radinsky (bullpen); 92 Anel De Los Santos (bullpen catcher); 21 Dino Ebel (bench); 70 Tom Gregorio (bullpen catcher); 31 Dave Hansen (hitting); 41 Charles Nagy (pitching); 61 Steve Soliz (catching/player information); 55 Paul Sorrento (assistant hitting); 3 Alfredo Griffin (first base); 10 Ron Roenicke (third base)

== Player stats ==
=== Batting ===
Note: G = Games played; AB = At bats; R = Runs; H = Hits; 2B = Doubles; 3B = Triples; HR = Home runs; RBI = Runs batted in; SB = Stolen bases; BB = Walks; AVG = Batting average; SLG = Slugging average

Player	G	AB	R	H	2B	3B	HR	RBI	SB	BB	AVG	SLG
Albert Pujols	149	593	53	143	17	0	23	101	3	37	.241	.386
Andrelton Simmons	158	589	77	164	38	2	14	69	19	47	.278	.421
Kole Calhoun	155	569	77	139	23	2	19	71	5	71	.244	.392
Martín Maldonado	138	429	43	95	19	1	14	38	0	15	.221	.368
Mike Trout	114	402	92	123	25	3	33	72	22	94	.306	.629
Yunel Escobar	89	350	43	96	20	1	7	31	1	29	.274	.397
Luis Valbuena	117	347	42	69	15	0	22	65	0	48	.199	.432
C.J. Cron	100	339	39	84	14	1	16	56	3	22	.248	.437
Cameron Maybin	93	336	57	79	19	1	6	22	29	48	.235	.351
Ben Revere	109	291	37	80	13	2	1	20	21	15	.275	.344
Danny Espinosa	77	228	27	37	8	0	6	29	3	19	.162	.276
Cliff Pennington	87	194	23	49	6	0	3	21	3	16	.253	.330
Jefry Marte	45	127	10	22	5	0	4	14	1	13	.173	.307
Eric Young Jr.	47	110	24	29	5	0	4	16	12	5	.264	.418
Kaleb Cowart	50	102	18	23	5	1	3	11	4	10	.225	.382
Brandon Phillips	24	102	13	26	7	0	2	8	1	2	.255	.382
Justin Upton	27	98	19	24	7	0	7	15	4	17	.245	.531
Juan Graterol	48	84	5	17	4	0	0	10	0	1	.202	.250
Shane Robinson	20	31	7	6	0	0	0	1	2	3	.194	.194
Nick Franklin	13	24	2	3	1	0	0	2	0	5	.125	.167
Nolan Fontana	12	20	1	1	0	0	1	1	1	3	.050	.200
Carlos Pérez	11	20	1	2	0	0	1	3	0	1	.100	.250
Ramón Flores	3	8	0	1	0	0	0	1	0	0	.125	.125
César Puello	1	4	0	1	0	0	0	1	2	0	.250	.250
Pitcher totals	162	18	0	1	0	0	0	0	0	2	.056	.056
Team totals	162	5415	710	1314	251	14	186	678	136	523	.243	.397

=== Pitching ===
Note: W = Wins; L = Losses; ERA = Earned run average; G = Games pitched; GS = Games started; SV = Saves; IP = Innings pitched; H = Hits allowed; R = Runs allowed; ER = Earned runs allowed; BB = Walks allowed; SO = Strikeouts

Player	W	L	ERA	G	GS	SV	IP	H	R	ER	BB	SO
Ricky Nolasco	6	15	4.92	33	33	0	181.0	205	102	99	58	143
J. C. Ramírez	11	10	4.15	27	24	0	147.1	149	72	68	49	105
Jesse Chavez	7	11	5.35	38	21	0	138.0	148	83	82	45	119
Parker Bridwell	10	3	3.64	21	20	0	121.0	115	52	49	30	73
Yusmeiro Petit	5	2	2.76	60	1	4	91.1	69	32	28	18	101
Tyler Skaggs	2	6	4.55	16	16	0	85.0	90	46	43	28	76
Matt Shoemaker	6	3	4.52	14	14	0	77.2	73	41	39	28	69
Blake Parker	3	3	2.54	71	0	8	67.1	40	20	19	16	86
Alex Meyer	4	5	3.74	13	13	0	67.1	48	30	28	42	75
Bud Norris	2	6	4.21	60	3	19	62.0	56	29	29	27	74
Keynan Middleton	6	1	3.86	64	0	3	58.1	60	25	25	18	63
José Àlvarez	0	3	3.88	64	0	1	48.2	50	23	21	12	45
Cam Bedrosian	6	5	4.43	48	0	6	44.2	41	26	22	17	53
David Hernandez	1	0	2.23	38	0	1	36.1	29	10	9	8	37
Garrett Richards	0	2	2.28	6	6	0	27.2	18	8	7	7	27
Deolis Guerra	2	2	4.68	19	0	0	25.0	20	13	13	12	22
Troy Scribner	2	1	4.18	10	4	0	23.2	17	14	11	10	18
Eduardo Paredes	0	1	4.43	18	0	1	22.1	21	11	11	6	17
Andrew Heaney	1	2	7.06	5	5	0	21.2	27	17	17	9	27
Daniel Wright	0	1	4.58	5	2	0	19.2	21	12	10	8	11
Blake Wood	2	0	4.76	17	0	0	17.0	20	9	9	4	22
Mike Morin	0	0	6.91	10	0	0	14.1	21	11	11	2	10
Fernando Salas	1	0	2.63	13	0	0	13.2	7	4	4	2	9
Brooks Pounders	1	0	10.45	11	0	0	10.1	17	12	12	5	12
Noé Ramirez	0	0	2.16	10	0	0	8.1	3	3	2	4	10
Huston Street	0	0	0.00	4	0	0	4.0	2	0	0	1	3
Andrew Bailey	2	0	0.00	4	0	0	4.0	1	0	0	0	2
Kirby Yates	0	0	18.00	1	0	0	1.0	2	2	2	0	1
José Valdez	0	0	18.00	1	0	0	1.0	1	2	2	1	1
Jason Gurka	0	0	0.00	3	0	0	0.2	2	0	0	1	0
Damien Magnifico	0	0	0.00	1	0	0	0.1	0	0	0	2	1
Team totals	80	82	4.20	162	162	43	1440.2	1373	709	672	470	1312

== Farm system ==
Level	Team	League	Manager
AAA	Salt Lake Bees	Pacific Coast League	Keith Johnson
AA	Mobile BayBears	Southern League	Sal Fasano
A-Advanced	Inland Empire 66ers	California League	Chad Tracy
A	Burlington Bees	Midwest League	Adam Melhuse
Rookie	Orem Owlz	Pioneer League	Tom Nieto
Rookie	AZL Angels	Arizona League	Dave Stapleton
Rookie	DSL Angels	Dominican Summer League	Héctor de la Cruz

All coaches and rosters can be found on each team's website.

Records
Preceded by 2016	Los Angeles Angels seasons 2017	Succeeded by 2018
