= Nick Franklin =

American baseball player (born 1991)

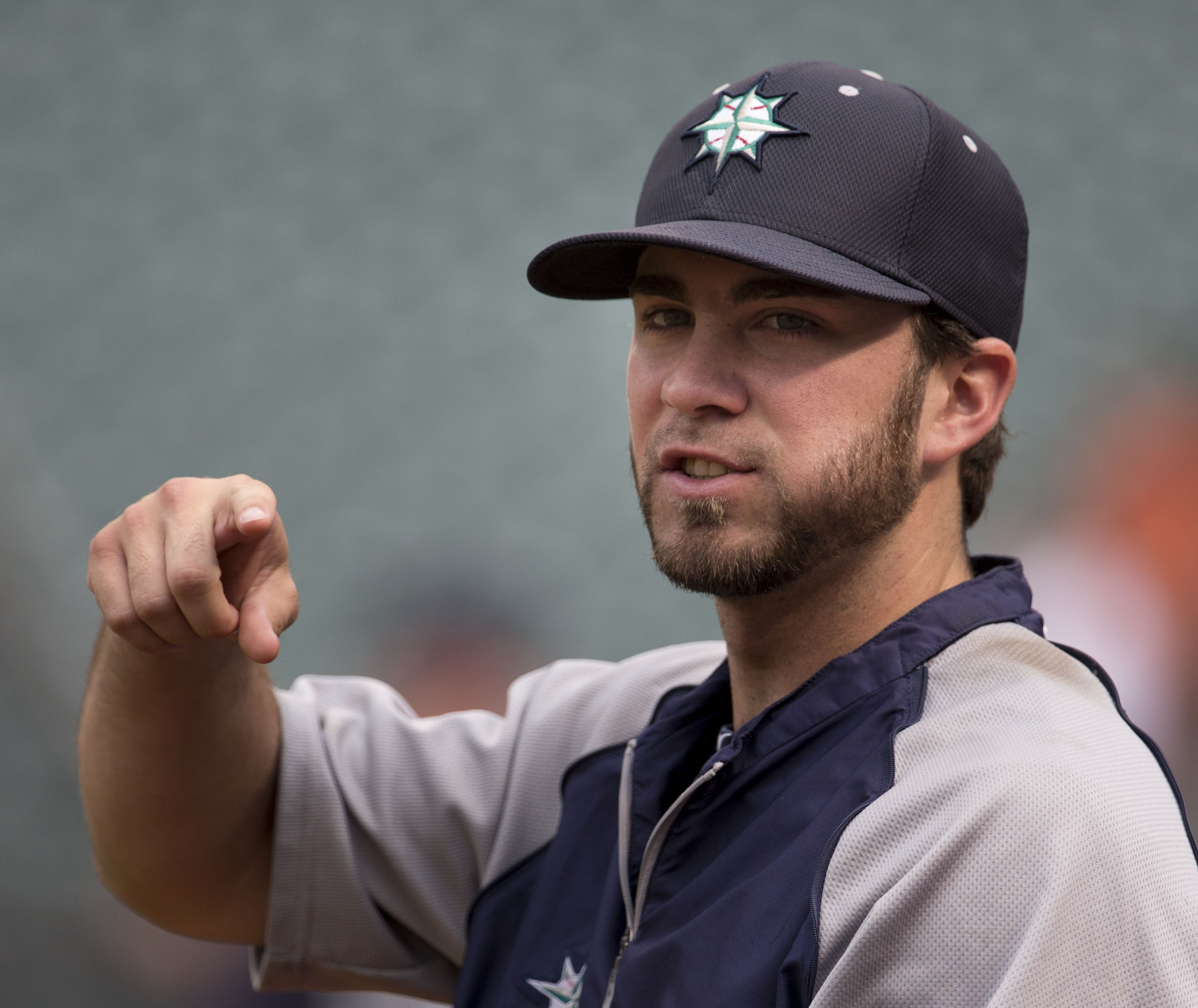
- Franklin with the Seattle Mariners in 2013
- Second baseman / Outfielder
- Born: March 2, 1991 (age 35); Sanford, Florida, U.S.
- Batted: Switch Threw: Right

MLB debut
- May 27, 2013, for the Seattle Mariners

Last MLB appearance
- May 8, 2018, for the Milwaukee Brewers

MLB statistics
- Batting average: .214
- Home runs: 24
- Runs batted in: 96
- Stats at Baseball Reference

Teams
- Seattle Mariners (2013–2014); Tampa Bay Rays (2014–2016); Milwaukee Brewers (2017); Los Angeles Angels (2017); Milwaukee Brewers (2018)
Medals
Men's baseball
Representing United States
World Junior Baseball Championship
Silver medal – second place	2008 Edmonton	Team

Nicholas Edward Franklin (born March 2, 1991) is an American former professional baseball second baseman and outfielder. He was drafted by the Seattle Mariners in the first round, 27th pick overall, of the 2009 Major League Baseball draft. In high school, he was named the player of the year by the Orlando Sentinel in 2009. He played in Major League Baseball (MLB) for the Seattle Mariners, Tampa Bay Rays, Milwaukee Brewers, and Los Angeles Angels from 2013 to 2018.

== Amateur career ==
In 2007 and 2008, Franklin played for the USA Baseball Youth National Team, which played in Canada and Venezuela. Franklin attended Lake Brantley High School. He took two months off of baseball after his junior season to weight train. On April 16, 2009 Orlando Sentinel named Franklin the "Boy Athlete of the Week". Franklin was named the "Orlando Sentinel Baseball Player of the Year" in 2009 after he batted .538 with 11 home runs. In high school, a professional scout compared Franklin's skills to that of a "switch-hitting Michael Young".

== Professional career ==
=== Seattle Mariners ===
Franklin was drafted by the Seattle Mariners in the first round of the 2009 MLB draft. Before being drafted, hr committed to play college baseball for the Auburn Tigers. On August 16, 2009, Franklin signed a contract with a $1.28 million signing bonus. Franklin began his professional career that summer, splitting time between the rookie-league AZL Mariners of the Arizona League, and the Class-A Short-Season Everett AquaSox of the Northwest League. In Arizona, Franklin batted .302 with six runs, 13 hits, two doubles, one home run, and four runs batted in (RBIs) in 10 games. With the AquaSox, he batted .400 with four runs, eight hits, two doubles, one triple, and two RBIs in six games.

Before the 2010 season, Baseball America named Franklin the seventh-best prospect in the Mariners' organization. He began the season with the Class-A Clinton LumberKings of the Midwest League. On April 11, Franklin hit two home runs in the same game. In that game, he was a single shy of hitting for the cycle. With the LumberKings that year, Franklin has batted .281 with 89 runs, 144 hits, 22 doubles, seven triples, 23 home runs, 65 RBIs, and 25 stolen bases. He also played one game with the Double-A West Tenn Diamond Jaxx, getting two hits in three at-bats. His 2010 season with the LumberKings features prominently in the book Class A: Baseball in the Middle of Everywhere, by Lucas Mann. After the season, Baseball America named him as the sixth best prospect in the Midwest League.

Franklin made his major league debut for the Seattle Mariners on May 27, 2013. He recorded his first career hit on May 29. On May 30, Franklin hit his first two career home runs. He set a club record, being the quickest player to have a two-homer game in just his fourth game. The previous record was held by Jose Cruz Jr., who had a two-homer game in his sixth game as a rookie in 1997. Franklin hit his first major-league grand slam on July 21, 2013, in the second inning versus Houston Astros pitcher Jordan Lyles.

=== Tampa Bay Rays ===
On July 31, 2014, Franklin was traded, along with left-hander Drew Smyly to the Tampa Bay Rays in a three team deal that sent David Price to the Detroit Tigers and Austin Jackson to the Seattle Mariners. Franklin finished the 2016 season with a .270 batting average. He was designated for assignment on April 1, 2017.

=== Milwaukee Brewers ===
Franklin was claimed off waivers by the Milwaukee Brewers on April 5, 2017. On June 27, he was designated for assignment by the Brewers.

=== Los Angeles Angels ===
On June 30, 2017, Franklin was traded to the Los Angeles Angels in exchange for cash considerations or a player to be named later. In 13 games for the Angels, he went 3–for–24 (.125) with two RBI and five walks. On July 29, Franklin was designated for assignment following the promotion of Troy Scribner. He cleared waivers and was sent outright to the Triple–A Salt Lake Bees on July 31. Franklin played in only three games for Salt Lake, and elected free agency following the season on November 6.

=== Milwaukee Brewers (second stint) ===
On February 15, 2018, Franklin signed a minor league contract with the Milwaukee Brewers. Franklin was called up in early May but after two at-bats, he was forced miss the remainder of the season due to a quad injury. He elected free agency on October 23.

=== Pittsburgh Pirates ===
On February 6, 2019, Franklin signed a minor league contract with the Pittsburgh Pirates. After beginning the season on the injured list due to hamstring tightness, he played in 44 games for the Triple–A Indianapolis Indians, hitting .193/.289/.316 with three home runs and 12 RBI. Franklin was released by the Pirates organization on June 28.

=== Los Angeles Angels (second stint) ===
On July 5, 2019, Franklin signed a minor league deal with the Los Angeles Angels and was assigned to the Triple-A Salt Lake Bees. In 41 games for the Bees, he batted .281/.380/.459 with three home runs and 24 RBI. Franklin became a free agent on November 4.

=== Independent baseball ===
On April 27, 2021, Franklin signed with the Kansas City Monarchs of the American Association of Professional Baseball. He appeared in just 4 games, going 4-for-14, before being placed on the inactive list.

On August 28, Franklin was traded to the Sioux City Explorers of the American Association for the reversionary rights to pitcher Nick Belzer and future considerations.

On August 5, 2022, Franklin was traded to the Kane County Cougars of the American Association for two players to be named later and cash. In 21 games for the Cougars, he hit .260/.370/.533 with 5 home runs and 19 RBI. On October 31, Franklin was released.

== Coaching career ==
On February 2, 2026, Franklin was announced as the bench coach for the Erie SeaWolves, the Double-A affiliate of the Detroit Tigers.

== Player profile ==
As a prospect, Jim Street, a reporter for MLB.com, called Franklin a "versatile" player who can play the infield, the outfield, and even pitch. Jonathan Mayo, also of MLB.com, said that Franklin had the potential for power, and also noted that "[Franklin's] got wiry strength and decent speed". MLB.com rated Franklin a "solid defender" and his arm strength "average". Seattle Mariners' general manager Jack Zduriencik and scouting director Tom McNamara were reportedly impressed by Franklin's dedication to the game of baseball. On January 25, 2011 MLB.com ranked Franklin as the 38th best prospect in MLB. With the Mariners, Franklin was a relative rarity among big league players in using a batting helmet with two ear flaps (others to use this sort of helmet include Shane Victorino and Shin-Soo Choo). Since joining the Rays he started using a more conventional one-flap helmet.
