= Bud Norris =

American baseball player (born 1985)

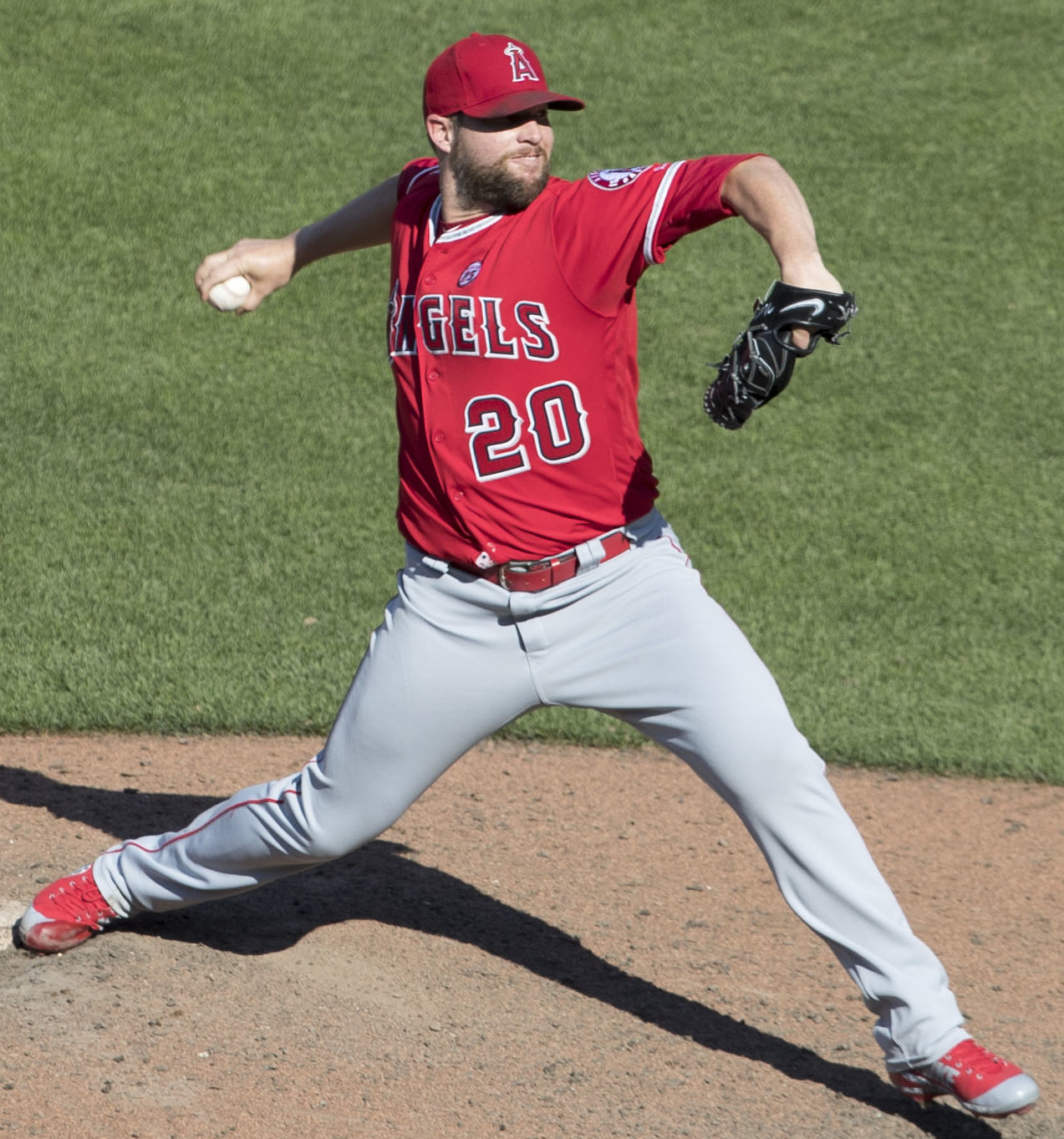
- Norris with the Los Angeles Angels in 2017
- Pitcher
- Born: March 2, 1985 (age 40); Greenbrae, California, U.S.
- Batted: Right Threw: Right

MLB debut
- July 29, 2009, for the Houston Astros

Last MLB appearance
- September 28, 2018, for the St. Louis Cardinals

MLB statistics
- Win–loss record: 67–90
- Earned run average: 4.45
- Strikeouts: 1,153
- Stats at Baseball Reference

Teams
- Houston Astros (2009–2013); Baltimore Orioles (2013–2015); San Diego Padres (2015); Atlanta Braves (2016); Los Angeles Dodgers (2016); Los Angeles Angels (2017); St. Louis Cardinals (2018)

David Stefan "Bud" Norris (March 2, 1985) is an American former professional baseball pitcher. He played in Major League Baseball (MLB) for the Houston Astros, Baltimore Orioles, San Diego Padres, Atlanta Braves, Los Angeles Dodgers, Los Angeles Angels, and St. Louis Cardinals.

== Amateur career ==
Originally from Novato, California, Norris attended Marin Catholic High School in Kentfield, California, later transferring and graduating from San Marin High School in Novato, California, and later California Polytechnic State University in San Luis Obispo, California. At Cal Poly, Norris was a roommate as well as a teammate of fellow major league pitcher Casey Fien.

== Professional career ==
=== Minor leagues ===
Norris was selected by the Houston Astros in the sixth round (189th overall) of the 2006 Major League Baseball draft. In 2009, Norris received an invitation to the Astros' spring training camp. Baseball America ranked him as the number two prospect in the Astros' system. In August 2009, he was named the Pacific Coast League Pitcher of the Year after leading the league with a 2.63 earned run average.

=== Houston Astros ===
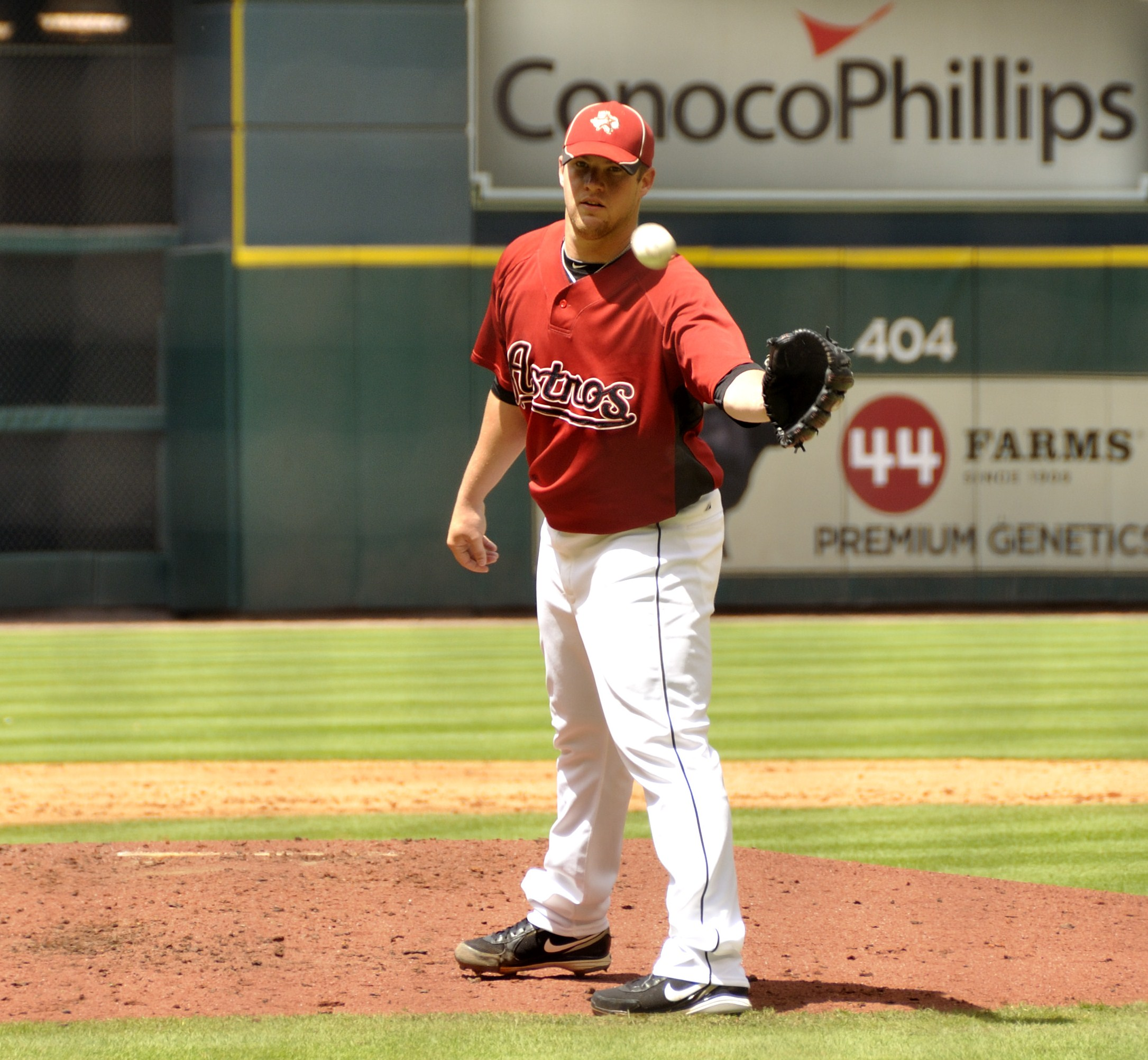
Norris with the Houston Astros in 2010

In July 2009, Norris was called up to pitch for the Astros following an injury to pitcher Roy Oswalt. He made his major league debut on July 29, pitching three innings of relief against the Chicago Cubs. In his first major league start on August 2, 2009, he took a no-hitter into the sixth inning and pitched seven shutout innings against the St. Louis Cardinals to earn his first career victory. In his rookie season overall, Norris went 6–3 with a 4.53 ERA in ten starts. He was shut down near the end of the season to prevent potential injury.

Norris had a shaky start in 2010, with a 2–6 record and 5.97 ERA up to the All-Star break. After the All-Star break he was much better, posting a 7–4 record with a 4.18 ERA. He finished the 2010 season at 9–10 with a 4.92 ERA.

On June 8, 2011, Norris took a no-hitter into the seventh inning before former Astro Lance Berkman broke it up with his 14th home run of the season, and his fourth of the season against Houston. Norris was still able to earn the win. He finished 2011 with a win–loss record of 6–11, even though he actually pitched well, as evidenced by his 3.77 ERA. Houston's poor offense in 2011 resulted in many low-scoring losses.

Norris went 7–13 with a 4.65 ERA in 2012. He began the season well, going 5–1 and 3.12 through May 21, but as Houston's season went rapidly downhill so did Norris'. He proceeded to go 0–12 with a 6.34 ERA during a streak of 18 starts while he battled injuries and inconsistencies. He finally ended the streak of futility on September 26 with a scoreless start on his way to a win at home against the St. Louis Cardinals and wrapped up his season with another scoreless effort and win at Wrigley Field against the Chicago Cubs. He was the last pitcher to bat at Minute Maid Park prior to the Astros' transfer to the American League for the 2013 season.

Just before the deadline for clubs and players to exchange numbers for arbitration on January 18, 2013, Norris agreed to $3 million for the 2013 season.

=== Baltimore Orioles ===
On July 31, 2013, Norris was traded to the Baltimore Orioles for L. J. Hoes and minor league pitcher Josh Hader. On the day after the trade, the Astros were already in Baltimore playing the Orioles, so Norris switched dugouts and won the game.

Norris was ejected on May 12, 2014, when he hit Detroit Tigers outfielder Torii Hunter in the ribs with a pitch at Camden Yards, prompting both the Orioles' and Tigers' benches and bullpens to clear. Norris had also had run-ins earlier in the season with Boston Red Sox catcher David Ross and Pittsburgh Pirates infielder Neil Walker, but the Hunter incident resulted in his first major-league ejection. At the time of his ejection, Norris was tied for second in the American League (AL) with 5 hit batters in 43 innings, an average of 1 hit batter every 8.6 innings. In his prior career spanning 740 innings pitched since 2009, Norris had hit only 27 batters, an average of one every 27.4 innings.

On January 26, 2015, Norris and the Orioles agreed to a $8.8 million contract. He would get a $25,000 bonus for 180 innings and $50,000 more for 200 under Monday's agreement. Norris also would earn $50,000 each for making the All-Star Game or winning a Gold Glove. Norris was designated for assignment on July 31, and released on August 8.

=== San Diego Padres ===
On August 11, 2015, Norris signed with the San Diego Padres for the remainder of the 2015 season.

=== Atlanta Braves ===
On November 25, 2015, Norris signed a one-year, $2.5 million contract with the Atlanta Braves. He began the 2016 season in the Braves rotation, but had been moved to the bullpen by the end of April, as he had compiled a 1–4 record and 8.74 ERA in five starts. By May 20, Norris had made seven relief appearances for the team and recorded a 1.32 ERA. He returned to the rotation on June 4, in a spot start, as Mike Foltynewicz was placed on the disabled list.

=== Los Angeles Dodgers ===
On June 30, 2016, Norris was traded to the Los Angeles Dodgers (along with minor leaguers Dian Toscano and Alex Grosser and cash considerations) in exchange for minor league pitchers Caleb Dirks and Philip Pfeifer.

On July 26, 2016, Norris recorded his 1,000th strikeout, in a 3–2 win against the Tampa Bay Rays. He made nine starts for the Dodgers, four relief appearances, while posting a 3–3 record, and a 6.54 ERA. For the 2016 season — combining Norris’ overall stats from the Braves and Dodgers — he tied (with Clay Buchholz) for the major league lead in grand slams allowed, with three.

Norris was designated for assignment by the Dodgers on September 20, 2016 and he was released one week later.

=== Los Angeles Angels ===
On January 30, 2017, Norris signed a minor league contract with the Los Angeles Angels. After a strong performance in spring training, Norris won a spot in the Angels bullpen as their long reliever. After a rash of injuries to begin the season, including to closer Cam Bedrosian, Norris was entrusted as the Angels acting closer.

On July 30, 2017 Norris surrendered a walk-off grand slam to Steve Pearce to cap a seven-run ninth inning that lifted the Toronto Blue Jays to an 11–10 victory over the Angels. This made him the first pitcher to allow two walk-off grand slams in one season since Francisco Rodriguez did in 2009 (six days prior on July 24, Norris surrendered a grand slam to Edwin Encarnación with the score tied in the bottom of the eleventh that gave the Cleveland Indians and 11–7 win over the Angels). From April 22 to August 4, Norris collected 18 saves for the Angels. He was relieved from the closer role after August 4 in favor of Bedrosian.

=== St. Louis Cardinals ===
On February 14, 2018, Norris signed a one-year contract with the St. Louis Cardinals. On May 1, 2018, Norris was named the Cardinals closer. He finished his 2018 campaign with a 3-6 record and a 3.59 ERA along with going 28-for-33 in save opportunities in 64 games.

=== Toronto Blue Jays ===
On March 6, 2019, Norris signed a minor league contract with the Toronto Blue Jays that included an invitation to spring training. Norris was released on April 2, 2019.

=== Philadelphia Phillies ===
On January 22, 2020, Norris signed a minor league deal with the Philadelphia Phillies. Norris did not play in a game in 2020 due to the cancellation of the minor league season because of the COVID-19 pandemic. He was released by the Phillies organization on July 16.

=== Sugar Land Skeeters ===
In July 2020, Norris signed on to play for the Sugar Land Skeeters of the Constellation Energy League (a makeshift 4-team independent league created as a result of the COVID-19 pandemic) for the 2020 season. In 2 games 2 innings of relief he went 0-0 with a 0.00 ERA and 2 strikeouts.

=== Winnipeg Goldeyes ===
On July 10, 2021, Norris signed with the Winnipeg Goldeyes of the American Association of Professional Baseball. Norris recorded a 0-0 record, 0.00 ERA, and 9 strikeouts in 6 appearances with the Goldeyes. On August 10, 2021, Norris was released by the Goldeyes

== Pitching style ==
Norris throws five pitches, although against right-handers he uses only his four-seam fastball (91–94 mph) and slider (83–87). Against lefties, he adds a changeup (85–87). Especially against righties, the slider is his favorite two-strike pitch. It also carries a whiff rate of 38%. Norris also throws a sinker and a curveball. Norris had a win–loss record of 38–49 at the end of the 2013 season. He allowed 1.1 home runs for each nine innings and a 1.411 WHIP ratio of baserunners. He also has a high strikeouts per nine innings ratio. He has finished in the top 10 among National League pitchers in 2011 and 2012.

== See also ==
- List of Major League Baseball single-inning strikeout leaders
