= Blake Parker =

American baseball player (born 1985)

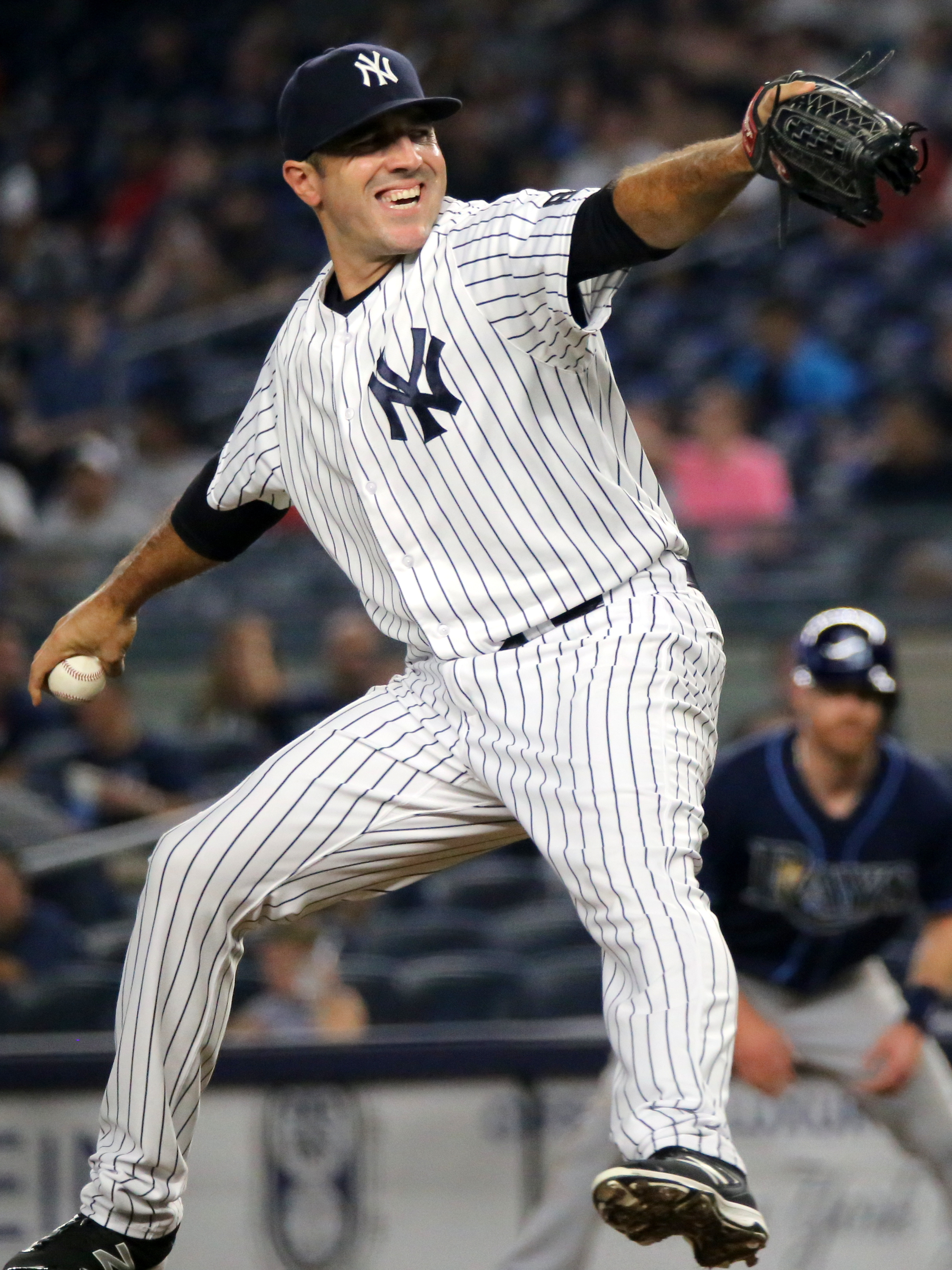
- Parker with the New York Yankees in 2016
- Pitcher
- Born: June 19, 1985 (age 41); Fayetteville, Arkansas, U.S.
- Batted: Right Threw: Right

MLB debut
- May 17, 2012, for the Chicago Cubs

Last MLB appearance
- October 1, 2021, for the Cleveland Indians

MLB statistics
- Win–loss record: 16–11
- Earned run average: 3.47
- Strikeouts: 383
- Stats at Baseball Reference

Teams
- Chicago Cubs (2012–2014); Seattle Mariners (2016); New York Yankees (2016); Los Angeles Angels (2017–2018); Minnesota Twins (2019); Philadelphia Phillies (2019–2020); Cleveland Indians (2021)

Richard Blake Parker (born June 19, 1985) is an American former professional baseball pitcher. He played in Major League Baseball (MLB) for the Chicago Cubs, Seattle Mariners, New York Yankees, Los Angeles Angels, Minnesota Twins, Philadelphia Phillies, and Cleveland Indians. Parker was drafted by the Cubs in the 16th round of the 2006 MLB draft and made his major league debut in 2012.

== Career ==
=== Amateur ===
Parker was born in Fayetteville, Arkansas. He attended Fayetteville High School in Fayetteville, and the University of Arkansas, where he played college baseball for the Arkansas Razorbacks. In 2005, he played collegiate summer baseball with the Bourne Braves of the Cape Cod Baseball League. Parker was drafted by the Chicago Cubs in the 16th round of the 2006 MLB draft, being signed by scout Brian Milner.

=== Chicago Cubs ===
Parker began his professional career in 2006 as a first baseman, third baseman, and catcher, and did not start pitching until 2007, splitting the season between the AZL Cubs (11 games) and Boise Hawks (8 games), with a combined record of 2–0 and a 2.39 ERA. He was an AZL post-season All Star in 2006.

In 2008, Parker played for three teams—the Peoria Chiefs (23 games; with whom he was a Midwest League mid-season All Star), the Daytona Cubs (20 games), and the Iowa Cubs (two games)—going 4–2 with a 2.13 ERA and 12 saves in 45 games combined. In 71 2/3 innings, he allowed only 50 hits while striking out 75 batters.

He split the 2009 season between the Tennessee Smokies (10 games) and Iowa Cubs (45 games), going a combined 2–3 with a 2.70 ERA, saving 25 games in 55 appearances. His 22 saves with Iowa were 5th-most in the Pacific Coast League. In 63 1/3 innings, Parker allowed 44 hits and struck out 77 batters. He then played for Mesa in the Arizona Fall League, and was named a Rising Star.

Parker began the 2010 season with the Iowa Cubs, and split the year between Iowa (35 games) and Tennessee (13 games), going a combined 1–5 with a 4.21 ERA. In 2011, he went 4–5 with a 3.23 ERA in 53 games split between Iowa (37 games) and Tennessee (16 games).

The Cubs promoted him to MLB on May 17, 2012. He pitched only six innings with the Cubs in 2012.

In 2013 with the Cubs he was 1–2 with one save and a 2.72 ERA, in 49 games, as he struck out 55 batters in 46 1/3 innings.

In 2014 with the Cubs he was 1–1 with a 5.14 ERA, in 18 games, as he struck out 24 batters in 21 innings. With Iowa, he was 0–1 with a league-leading 25 saves and a 1.77 ERA in 35 games. He was a Pacific Coast League mid-season and post-season All Star in 2014.

In 2015 he did not pitch in the major leagues, and was limited to three games at Triple-A Iowa, as he had season-ending surgery to remove loose bodies in his right elbow. Parker was released from the Cubs in May 2015.

=== Seattle Mariners (2016) ===
On December 17, Parker signed a minor league contract with the Seattle Mariners. In the minors, he was again a Pacific Coast League mid-season All Star, playing for the Tacoma Rainiers. The Mariners promoted Parker to the major leagues on August 4, 2016, and he pitched one scoreless inning for them in 2016.

=== New York Yankees (2016) ===
On August 9, 2016, the New York Yankees claimed Parker off of waivers. With the Yankees, he was 1–0 with one save and a 4.96 ERA in 16 games.

=== Los Angeles Angels (2017–18) ===
After the 2016 season, the Los Angeles Angels claimed Parker from the Yankees off of waivers. On November 23, 2016, Parker was claimed off waivers by the Milwaukee Brewers. The Brewers designated him for assignment in December, and he was claimed by the Angels on December 23.

The Angels named Parker to their Opening Day 25-man roster for the 2017 season. In his first season as an Angel, Parker enjoyed career bests in many statistical categories. He was 3–3 with 8 saves and a 2.54 ERA, with 86 strikeouts in 67 1/3 innings, and pitched in 71 games (6th-most in the American League). His WHIP of 0.83 tied for third-best among American League relievers.

Parker signed a $1.8 million contract with the Angels for the 2018 season. After pitching to a 2–1 record with a 3.26 ERA in 67 games while also collecting 14 saves, striking out 70 batters in 66 1/3 innings, and finishing 41 games (8th-most in the American League), he was non-tendered by the Angels in the offseason.

=== Minnesota Twins (2019) ===
On January 14, 2019, Parker signed a one-year deal with the Minnesota Twins. On July 24, Parker was designated for assignment by the Twins. In 2019 with the Twins, he was 1–2 with 10 saves and a 4.21 ERA, in 37 games.

=== Philadelphia Phillies (2019–2020) ===
On July 30, 2019, the Philadelphia Phillies signed Parker to a major league contract. For the Phillies in 2019, he was 2-1 with a 5.04 ERA in 23 games (2 starts; the first of his professional career) over 25.0 innings in which he struck out 31 batters (11.2 strikeouts per 9 innings). Parker re-signed with the Phillies organization on a minor league deal on February 5, 2020. On August 11, Parker was selected to the active roster. In 2020 for Philadelphia, Parker pitched to a 3-0 record with a 2.81 ERA and 25 strikeouts over 16.0 innings pitched in 14 appearances. On October 30, 2020, Parker was outrighted off of the 40-man roster and elected free agency.

=== Cleveland Indians (2021) ===
On February 16, 2021, Parker signed a minor league contract with the Cleveland Indians organization, worth $2.5 million in incentives, and was invited to the Indians' 2021 major league spring training camp. He began the 2021 season with the Columbus Clippers of the newly-formed Triple-A East. On June 5, 2021, Parker was selected to the active roster.

Parker became a free agent on November 3, 2021.

=== St. Louis Cardinals (2022) ===
On March 26, 2022, Parker signed a minor league contract with the St. Louis Cardinals. In 26 appearances for the Triple-A Memphis Redbirds, he struggled to a 6.59 ERA with 36 strikeouts across 27 1/3 innings pitched. Parker was released by the Cardinals organization on July 6.

== Personal life ==
Parker and his wife have three sons and one daughter.
