= Cam Bedrosian =

Armenian American baseball player (born 1991)

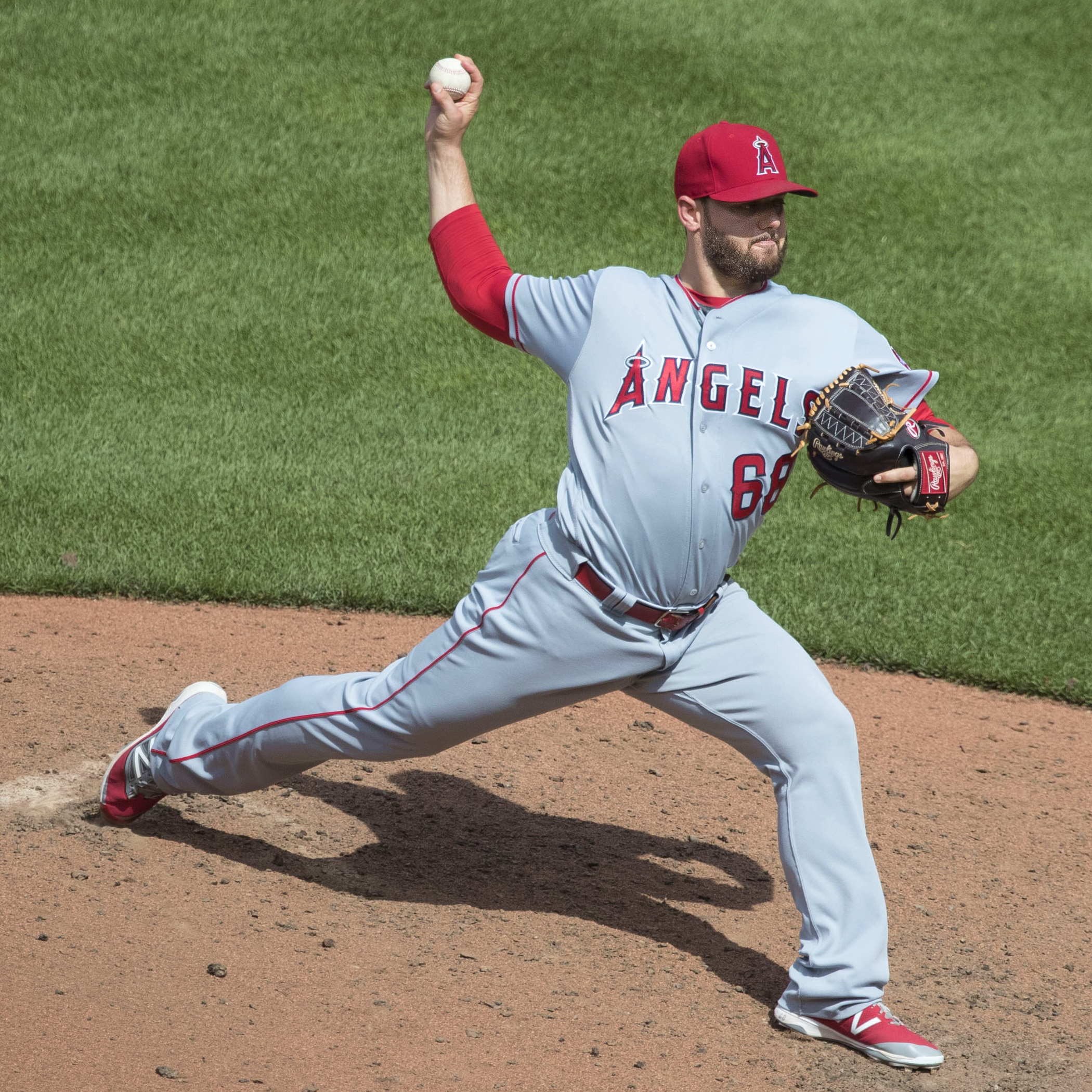
- Bedrosian with the Los Angeles Angels in 2017
- Pitcher
- Born: October 2, 1991 (age 34); Senoia, Georgia, U.S.
- Batted: Right Threw: Right

MLB debut
- June 3, 2014, for the Los Angeles Angels

Last MLB appearance
- October 3, 2021, for the Philadelphia Phillies

MLB statistics
- Win–loss record: 17–13
- Earned run average: 3.81
- Strikeouts: 313
- Stats at Baseball Reference

Teams
- Los Angeles Angels of Anaheim / Los Angeles Angels (2014–2020); Cincinnati Reds (2021); Oakland Athletics (2021); Philadelphia Phillies (2021)

Cameron Rock Bedrosian (born October 2, 1991) is an American former professional baseball pitcher. He played in Major League Baseball (MLB) for the Los Angeles Angels, Cincinnati Reds, Oakland Athletics, and Philadelphia Phillies. The Angels selected Bedrosian in the first round of the 2010 MLB draft. He made his MLB debut in 2014. He is the son of MLB Cy Young Award winning pitcher Steve Bedrosian.

== Early life ==
Bedrosian was born on October 2, 1991, the youngest of four sons born to Steve and Tammy Bedrosian. He grew up on a horse and wheat farm in Senoia, Georgia, operated by his father, a former professional baseball pitcher who spent 14 years in Major League Baseball (MLB) and won the Cy Young Award in 1987.

== Career ==
Bedrosian attended East Coweta High School in Sharpsburg, Georgia. He was named an All-American. He committed to attend Louisiana State University (LSU) on a baseball scholarship to play for the LSU Tigers.

=== Los Angeles Angels of Anaheim / Los Angeles Angels ===
The Los Angeles Angels of Anaheim selected Bedrosian in the first round, 29th overall, of the 2010 MLB draft, and he signed with the organization that summer for a bonus of $1.116 million. Bedrosian had previously committed to play college baseball for the LSU Tigers, but turned down an athletic scholarship in favor of beginning his professional baseball career. He was assigned to the Rookie-level Arizona League Angels, with whom Bedrosian had a 0-2 win–loss record and a 4.50 earned run average (ERA) in five games (four starts). He also struck out 10 batters in 12 innings pitched.

Bedrosian was invited to spring training in 2011, but during his first spring inning, his fastball velocity suddenly dropped from 92 to 85 mph (148 to 137 km/h). He was diagnosed with a torn ulnar collateral ligament (UCL) in his forearm, and underwent Tommy John Surgery on April 29. The recovery period for such a surgery prevented Bedrosian from pitching until May 1, 2012, when he joined the Low-A Cedar Rapids Kernels to pitch 4 1/3 no-hit innings.

In 2012, Bedrosian pitched for the Cedar Rapids Kernels of the Single–A Midwest League. He began the 2013 season with the Burlington Bees of the Midwest League, and was promoted to the Inland Empire 66ers of the High–A California League in August.

After starting the 2014 season with Inland Empire with 15 strikeouts in his first 20 batters faced, the Angels promoted him to the Arkansas Travelers of the Double–A Texas League in April. Bedrosian pitched to a 1.47 earned run average with 30 strikeouts in 18 1/3 innings, before the Angels promoted him to the major leagues on June 3.

In 2015 with the Angels he was 1–0 with a 5.40 ERA, and 9.2 strikeouts per nine innings.

On August 2, 2016, Bedrosian recorded his first major league save, in place of the injured Huston Street. This marked his 44th appearance in the 2016 season, in which he struck out the side against the Oakland Athletics, lowering his ERA to 0.90. In 2016 he was 2–0 with one save and a 1.12 ERA, and 11.4 strikeouts per nine innings.

Bedrosian began the 2017 season as the Angels closer, saving three games in the first two weeks of the season before going on the disabled list. He was activated on June 17. On August 9, Bedrosian was given back the closer role. In 2017 with the Angels he was 6–5 with six saves and a 4.43 ERA, and 10.7 strikeouts per nine innings.

In 2018, Bedrosian was 5–4 with one save and registered an ERA of 3.80 with 57 strikeouts in 64 innings in 71 games. In 2019, Bedrosian continued his success from the previous season, registering an ERA of 3.23 in 59 games while also serving as an opener for the team, starting 7 games.

On January 10, 2020, Bedrosian, still recovering from his forearm injury, signed a one-year, $2.8 million contract extension with the Angels. He opened the 2020 MLB season, which was shortened to only 60 games due to the COVID-19 pandemic, as one of three setup men to closer Hansel Robles, splitting the job with Ty Buttrey and Keynan Middleton. He was a steady arm in the bullpen through the first 10 games, with only one earned run in his first 4 1/3 innings, before a strained adductor muscle on his right thigh forced Bedrosian onto the injured list on August 4. He returned on September 3, pitching a perfect final inning against the San Diego Padres. Bedrosian pitched 14 2/3 innings across 11 games of the pandemic-shortened season, posting an ERA of 2.45 and striking out 11 batters. Despite showing steady improvement from 2018 to 2020, with an era of 3.41 across 141 games in that time frame, the Angels outrighted Bedrosian off the 40-man roster at the end of the season. The move was suspected to be financial, as Bedrosian was expected to make $3.5 million in the 2021 season if the stayed with the team. Rather than accepting his assignment to the minor leagues, Bedrosian elected to become a free agent.

=== Cincinnati Reds ===
On February 16, 2021, Bedrosian signed a minor league contract with the Cincinnati Reds, a deal that included an invitation to spring training. After impressing general manager Nick Krall with 16 strikeouts and only three hits in 8 2/3 spring training innings, Bedrosian was promoted to the major league roster on March 29. He failed to carry that performance into the regular season, posting an 11.12 ERA after allowing 10 hits, six walks, and two home runs in 5 2/3 innings. When Cincinnati needed to clear a spot on the 25-man roster for Sonny Gray, who was activated from the 10-day injured list on April 17, Bedrosian was designated for assignment. He cleared waivers and was assigned to the Reds' alternate training site in Louisville, but declined the move and elected free agency.

=== Oakland Athletics ===
Less than two weeks after being designated by the Reds, Bedrosian signed another minor league contract, this time with the Oakland Athletics. Although he was assigned to the Triple-A Las Vegas Aviators and Oakland manager Bob Melvin had no immediate plans to bring Bedrosian up to the Athletics, a number of injuries to Oakland's pitching staff left the team in need of backups. Bedrosian impressed Melvin in Triple-A, converting a save and holding his opponents scoreless over four games, and he was promoted to Oakland on May 21. After recording a 2.00 ERA in nine games for Oakland, Bedrosian was once again designated for assignment on June 29, this time as part of a larger series of roster moves to make room for infield prospect Frank Schwindel and reliever J. B. Wendelken. He cleared waivers again and elected free agency on July 2.

=== Philadelphia Phillies ===
On July 7, 2021, Bedrosian signed his third minor league contract of the year, this time with the Philadelphia Phillies, with whom his father had won the Cy Young Award in 1987. He made 16 appearances for the Lehigh Valley IronPigs, going 2–2 with a 2.25 ERA and striking out 20 batters in as many innings, before joining the Phillies when rosters expanded on September 1. In doing so, the Bedrosians became the third father-son duo to play for Philadelphia, following Rubén Amaro Sr. and Jr. and Mark Leiter Sr. and Jr. He pitched in 11 games for the Phillies, mostly in high-leverage situations during their ultimately unsuccessful run to capture the NL East title. In the process, Bedrosian struck out eight, allowed five earned runs, including two home runs, and posted a 4.35 ERA.

Bedrosian became a free agent following the season, but re-signed on a minor league contract on December 14, 2021. He spent most of the season injured and was released from his contract on August 9, 2022, without appearing for the Phillies or the IronPigs.

=== High Point Rockers ===
On June 6, 2023, Bedrosian signed with the High Point Rockers of the Atlantic League of Professional Baseball. In 35 relief outings for the Rockers, he compiled a 3.94 ERA with 54 strikeouts across 32 innings pitched. Bedrosian became a free agent following the season.

On June 4, 2024, Bedrosian re–signed with the Rockers. In 14 starts for the Rockers, he recorded a 7–3 record and 2.81 ERA with 87 strikeouts over 77 innings pitched. Bedrosian was released by High Point on September 3.

== Personal life ==
Bedrosian's father, Steve Bedrosian, is a former Major League baseball pitcher who pitched in 14 big league seasons and won the 1987 National League Cy Young Award. Cam is one of only four sons of former Cy Young Award winners to reach the big leagues, the others being Vance Law (son of 1960 MLB winner Vern Law), Kyle Drabek (son of 1990 NL winner Doug Drabek), and Kody Clemens (son of seven-time winner Roger Clemens).

Bedrosian is of Armenian descent.

== See also ==
- List of second-generation Major League Baseball players
