= J. C. Ramírez =

Nicaraguan baseball player (born 1988)

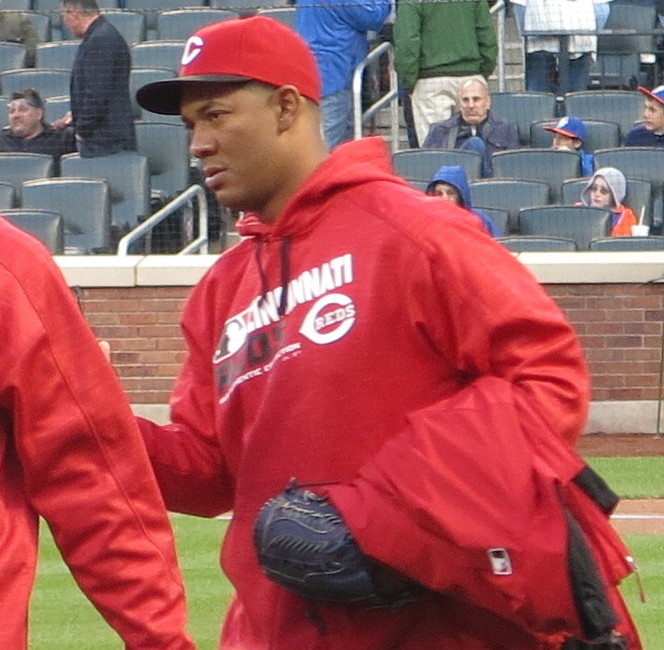
- Ramírez with the Cincinnati Reds in 2016

Free agent
- Pitcher
- Born: August 16, 1988 (age 38); Managua, Nicaragua
- Bats: Right Throws: Right

Professional debut
- MLB: June 23, 2013, for the Philadelphia Phillies
- CPBL: March 19, 2021, for the Fubon Guardians

MLB statistics (through 2019 season)
- Win–loss record: 15–19
- Earned run average: 4.71
- Strikeouts: 204

CPBL statistics (through 2021 season)
- Win–loss record: 4–5
- Earned run average: 3.43
- Strikeouts: 51
- Stats at Baseball Reference

Teams
- Philadelphia Phillies (2013); Arizona Diamondbacks (2015); Seattle Mariners (2015); Cincinnati Reds (2016); Los Angeles Angels (2016–2019); Fubon Guardians (2021)
Medals
Men's baseball
Representing Nicaragua
Central American and Caribbean Games
| Silver medal – second place | 2014 Veracruz | Team |

Juan Carlos Ramírez (born August 16, 1988) is a Nicaraguan professional baseball pitcher who is a free agent. He has previously played in Major League Baseball (MLB) for the Philadelphia Phillies, Arizona Diamondbacks, Seattle Mariners, Cincinnati Reds, and Los Angeles Angels, and in the Chinese Professional Baseball League (CPBL) for the Fubon Guardians.

== Professional career ==
=== Seattle Mariners ===
Ramírez began his professional career in 2006, pitching for the rookie-level VSL Mariners. With them, he went 5–1 with a 1.66 ERA in 14 games, 13 starts.

He pitched for the Low–A Everett Aqua Sox in 2007, posting a 3–7 record and an ERA of 4.30 in 15 games started.

In 2008, he pitched for the Single–A Wisconsin Timber Rattlers of the Midwest League, going 6–9 with a 4.14 ERA in 25 games, 22 starts.

With the High–A High Desert Mavericks in 2009, he went 8–10 with a 5.12 ERA in 28 games, 27 starts. He was added to the Mariners' 40-man roster on November 20 to protect him from the Rule 5 Draft.

=== Philadelphia Phillies ===
On December 16, 2009, Ramírez was traded with Phillippe Aumont and Tyson Gillies to the Philadelphia Phillies in exchange for Cliff Lee.

After the 2012 season, Ramirez played for the Nicaraguan national baseball team in the 2013 World Baseball Classic Qualifying Tournament.

On January 29, 2013, Ramírez was designated for assignment by the Phillies. On June 22, Ramirez's contract was selected and he was called up to the Phillies after Mike Adams was placed on the disabled list. He made his MLB debut on June 23 in a game against the New York Mets, and struck out the side with his fastball velocity reaching as high as 98 MPH over one inning. On August 2, Ramírez was designated for assignment again by the Phillies. On August 25, Ramírez was selected back to the 40-man roster. In 18 appearances for the Phillies during his rookie campaign, he struggled to a 7.50 ERA with 16 strikeouts across 24 innings. On October 16, Ramírez was removed from the 40-man roster and sent outright to the Triple-A Lehigh Valley IronPigs. He elected to become a free agent on October 18.

=== Cleveland Indians ===
On November 1, 2013, Ramírez signed a minor league contract with the Cleveland Indians organization. Ramírez split the 2014 season between the Double-A Akron RubberDucks and Triple-A Columbus Clippers, accumulating a 2–3 record and 3.05 ERA with 29 strikeouts and three saves across 44 1/3 innings pitched.

=== Arizona Diamondbacks ===
On December 1, 2014, Ramírez signed a minor league contract with the Arizona Diamondbacks. After beginning the year with the Triple–A Reno Aces, Ramírez was selected to the active roster on May 10, 2015. On May 25, Ramírez suffered his first loss since 2013, surrendering a walk-off home run to Jhonny Peralta. In 12 appearances for Arizona, he logged a 1–1 record and 4.11 ERA with 11 strikeouts across 15 1/3 innings pitched. On June 13, the Diamondbacks designated Ramírez for assignment.

=== Seattle Mariners (second stint) ===
Ramírez was traded by the Diamondbacks to the Seattle Mariners in exchange for cash on July 27, 2015. On September 8, the Mariners selected Ramírez to the active roster. In eight appearances for Seattle, he struggled to an 0–1 record and 7.56 ERA with five strikeouts across 8 1/3 innings of work. On November 6, the Mariners outrighted Ramírez off of the 40-man roster and he elected free agency.

=== Cincinnati Reds ===
Ramírez signed with the Cincinnati Reds as a free agent on November 25, 2015. He pitched in 27 games for Cincinnati with a 1–3 record, 6.40 ERA, 1.36 WHIP and 28 strikeouts in 32 1/3 innings pitched.

=== Los Angeles Angels ===
On June 26, 2016, Ramírez was claimed off waivers by the Los Angeles Angels. He pitched in a career–high 43 games and was an effective member of the bullpen, posting an ERA of 2.91 in 46 innings. In 2017, Ramírez began the season out of the bullpen, but due to numerous injuries to the Angels rotation he was pushed to a starting role. He was shut down in August after experiencing pain in his forearm. In 24 starts, he went 11–10 in 147 1/3 innings. Ramírez tore his UCL in his throwing elbow and underwent Tommy John surgery after only 2 starts for the 2018 season. He pitched 6 2/3 innings on the season with the Angels and was 0–2. On August 15, 2019, Ramírez was outrighted off the Angels roster after appearing in only 5 games due to injury. He elected free agency on October 14.

On February 19, 2020, Ramírez re-signed with the Angels on a minor league contract. He did not play in a game in 2020 due to the cancellation of the minor league season because of the COVID-19 pandemic. Ramírez became a free agent on November 2.

=== Fubon Guardians ===
On December 28, 2020, Ramírez signed with the Fubon Guardians of the Chinese Professional Baseball League for the 2021 season. On March 19, 2021, Ramírez made his CPBL debut. On July 9, Ramírez was released by the Guardians and left Taiwan.

=== Diablos Rojos del México ===
On July 13, 2021, Ramírez signed with the Diablos Rojos del México of the Mexican League. In 3 starts for México, he logged a 2–0 record and 3.68 ERA with 10 strikeouts across 14 2/3 innings pitched. Ramírez was released by the Diablos on January 26, 2022.

=== Minnesota Twins ===
On March 31, 2022, Ramírez signed a minor league contract with the Minnesota Twins. In 16 appearances for the Triple–A St. Paul Saints, he posted a 5.66 ERA with 28 strikeouts across 35 innings of work. Ramírez was released by the Twins organization on July 13.

=== Sultanes de Monterrey ===
On February 22, 2023, Ramírez signed with the Sultanes de Monterrey of the Mexican League. In 15 starts for Monterrey, he posted a 6–6 record and 4.59 ERA with 59 strikeouts across 80 1/3 innings pitched. Ramírez was released by the Sultanes on July 11.

=== Saraperos de Saltillo ===
On July 31, 2023, Ramírez signed with the Saraperos de Saltillo of the Mexican League. In 2 starts for the team, he registered a 4.50 ERA with 7 strikeouts over 12 innings. Ramírez failed to make Saltillo's Opening Day roster for the 2024 season and was released on April 6, 2024.

=== Rieleros de Aguascalientes ===
On April 30, 2024, Ramírez signed with the Rieleros de Aguascalientes of the Mexican League. In 14 starts for Aguascalientes, he compiled a 6–3 record and 4.00 ERA with 46 strikeouts across 72 innings pitched. Ramírez was released by the Rieleros on October 22.

=== York Revolution ===
On June 1, 2025, Ramírez signed with the York Revolution of the Atlantic League of Professional Baseball. In nine appearances (seven starts) for the Revolution, he struggled to a 1–2 record and 7.13 ERA with 24 strikeouts across 35 1/3 innings pitched. With York, Ramírez won the Atlantic League championship. He became a free agent following the season.
