= Alex Meyer (baseball) =

American baseball player (born 1990)

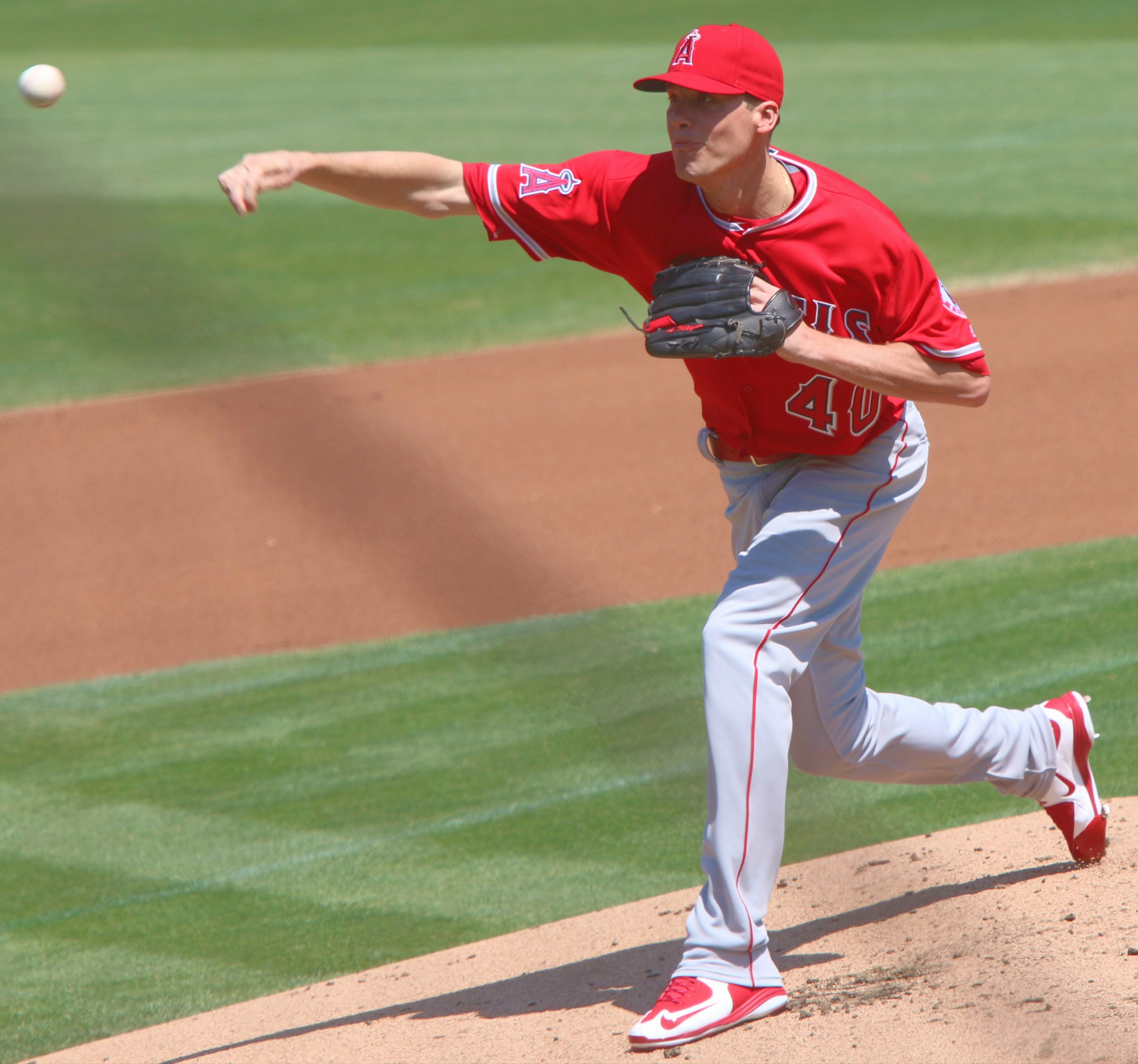
- Meyer pitching for the Los Angeles Angels in 2016
- Pitcher
- Born: January 3, 1990 (age 36); Greensburg, Indiana, U.S.
- Batted: Right Threw: Right

MLB debut
- June 26, 2015, for the Minnesota Twins

Last MLB appearance
- July 19, 2017, for the Los Angeles Angels

MLB statistics
- Win–loss record: 5–8
- Earned run average: 4.63
- Strikeouts: 107
- Stats at Baseball Reference

Teams
- Minnesota Twins (2015–2016); Los Angeles Angels (2016–2017)

Alex John Meyer (born January 3, 1990) is an American former professional baseball pitcher. He played college baseball for the Kentucky Wildcats and has played in Major League Baseball (MLB) for the Minnesota Twins and the Los Angeles Angels. He officially announced his retirement from baseball on June 25, 2019, due to injuries. He last played for the Angels in 2017.

== Amateur career ==
Meyer attended Greensburg High School in Greensburg, Indiana, and played for his high school's baseball team. In 2008, his senior year, Meyer had an 8–0 win–loss record, a 0.95 earned run average (ERA), and 108 strikeouts in 51 innings pitched. Meyer was named a high school All-American, Indiana's Mr. Baseball, and the Indiana Player of the Year by Gatorade and Louisville Slugger in 2008.

The Boston Red Sox selected Meyer in the 20th round of the 2008 MLB draft. Despite being reportedly offered as much as $2.2 million as a signing bonus, Meyer chose not to sign with the Red Sox so that he could follow through on his commitment to attend the University of Kentucky to play college baseball for the Kentucky Wildcats baseball team. In 2011, his junior year, Meyer had a 7–5 win–loss record with a 2.94 ERA, and led the Southeastern Conference with 110 strikeouts.

== Professional career ==
=== Washington Nationals ===
The Washington Nationals selected Meyer in the first round, with the 23rd overall selection, of the 2011 MLB draft. Before the 2012 season, MLB.com rated Meyer as the 83rd best prospect in baseball. He pitched for the Hagerstown Suns of the Class A South Atlantic League in 2012, and was named to appear in the All-Star Futures Game at midseason.

=== Minnesota Twins ===
After the 2012 season, the Nationals traded Meyer to the Minnesota Twins for Denard Span. The Twins invited Meyer to spring training in 2013. After the 2013 season, he participated in the Arizona Fall League. The Twins also invited Meyer to spring training in 2014. Before the 2014 season, Baseball America ranked Meyer as the 45th best prospect in baseball. Pitching for the Rochester Red Wings of the Class AAA International League in 2014, Meyer was named to the All-Star Futures Game.

Meyer began the 2015 season with Rochester. After struggling with a 7.09 ERA in his first eight starts, Meyer began working as a relief pitcher. He pitched to a 0.53 ERA with 20 strikeouts and six walks in 17 innings. The Twins promoted Meyer to the major leagues on June 25. He pitched in two games for the Twins, in which he allowed five runs, including three home runs, in 2 2/3 innings. The Twins demoted Meyer to Rochester, where he pitched to a 7.65 ERA in the next 20 innings he pitched, followed by 17 2/3 innings pitched without allowing a run to end the season.

In 2016, the Twins decided to send Meyer to Rochester to begin the season as a starting pitcher. The Twins promoted Meyer to the major leagues on April 25, but optioned him back to Rochester on May 3, after making two appearances for Minnesota.

=== Los Angeles Angels ===
On August 1, 2016, the Twins traded Meyer and Ricky Nolasco plus cash for Angels pitchers Hector Santiago and Alan Busenitz. Meyer was optioned to the Triple-A Salt Lake Bees on April 22, 2017.

On September 11, 2017, Angels general manager Billy Eppler announced that Meyer would undergo surgery to repair a torn labrum in his right shoulder. Meyer was on the disabled list since the middle of July. In 13 starts with the Angels, Meyer went 4–5, with a 3.74 ERA, while striking out 75 batters. He was designated for assignment on November 22, 2018, after missing the entire 2018 season. In late December 2018, he re-signed with the Angels to a minor league deal. Meyer retired from professional baseball on June 25, 2019, citing multiple surgeries and countless hours of rehab marking the end of the road.

== Personal ==
During the baseball offseason, Meyer served as a substitute teacher at Greensburg High School. He is currently the varsity baseball coach for the Greensburg Pirates.

Meyer's cousin, Bryan Hoeing, plays in MLB for the San Diego Padres.
