= Troy Scribner =

American baseball player (born 1991)

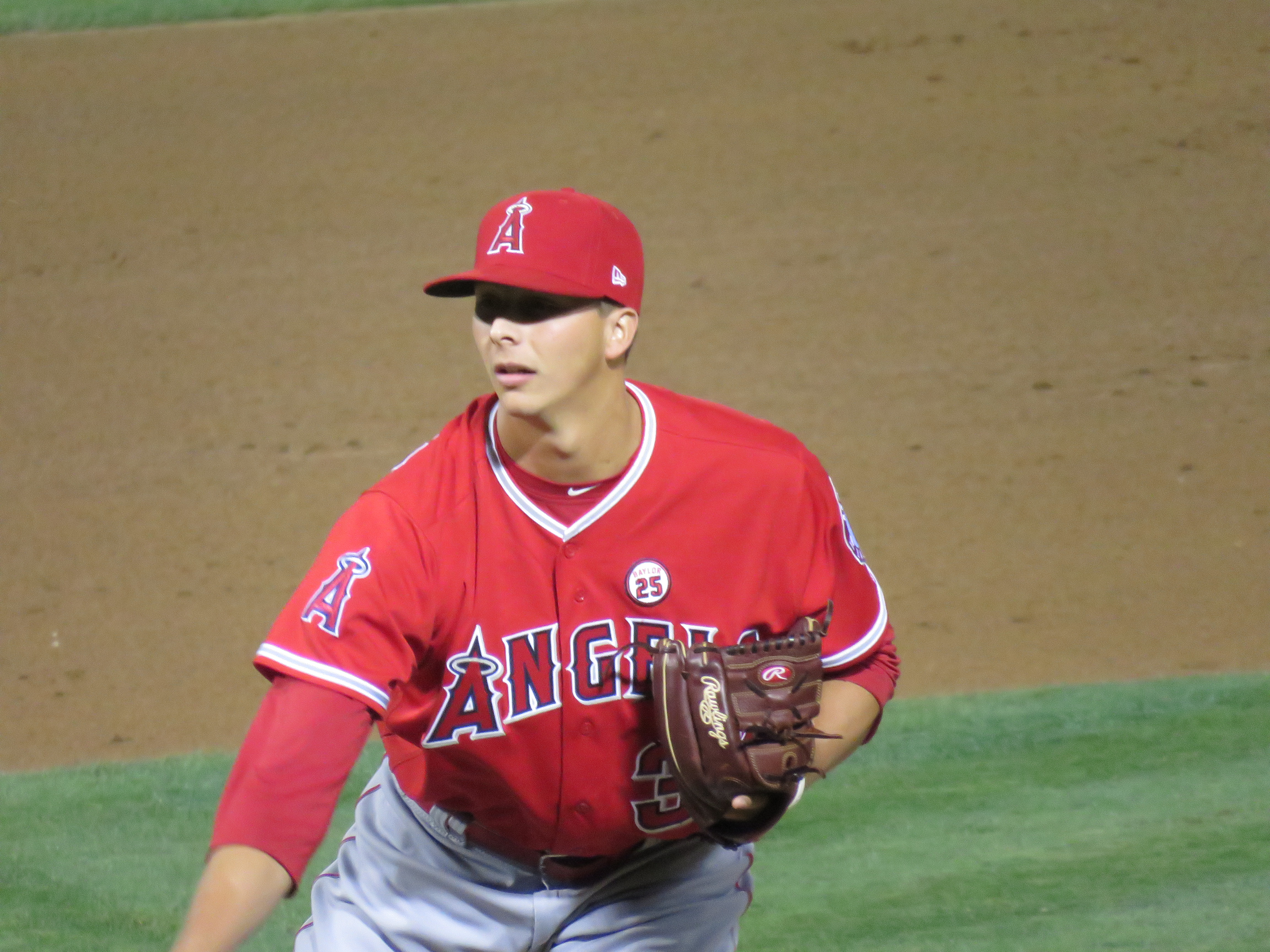
- Scribner with the Los Angeles Angels in 2017
- Pitcher
- Born: July 2, 1991 (age 35); Washington, Connecticut, U.S.
- Batted: Right Threw: Right

MLB debut
- July 29, 2017, for the Los Angeles Angels

Last MLB appearance
- May 12, 2018, for the Arizona Diamondbacks

MLB statistics
- Win–loss record: 2–2
- Earned run average: 4.28
- Strikeouts: 22
- Stats at Baseball Reference

Teams
- Los Angeles Angels (2017); Arizona Diamondbacks (2018)

Troy Alex Scribner (born July 2, 1991) is an American former professional baseball pitcher. He played in Major League Baseball (MLB) for the Los Angeles Angels and Arizona Diamondbacks.

== Career ==
=== Amateur ===
Scribner attended Sacred Heart University in Fairfield, Connecticut. In 2012, he briefly played collegiate summer baseball with the Falmouth Commodores of the Cape Cod Baseball League.

=== Houston Astros ===
He was signed by the Houston Astros as an undrafted free agent in 2013. He spent three seasons in the Astros organization, getting as high as Double-A with the Corpus Christi Hooks in 2014.

=== Los Angeles Angels ===
Prior to the 2016 season, he was traded to the Los Angeles Angels for cash considerations. Scribner started 2016 with the Arkansas Travelers, and was called up to the Salt Lake Bees on July 30. He started 2017 with the Bees, and was called up to the Angels on July 29, making his major league debut the same day. In his debut, Scribner pitched three innings in relief, allowing two runs on three hits and striking out two. Thanks to an Angels rally following his final inning of work, Scribner also was the winning pitcher for his debut game. For the season, Scribner appeared in 10 games, 4 starts for the Angels. He was 2–1 with a strikeout to walk ratio of 18/10.

Scribner was designated for assignment on April 3, 2018.

=== Arizona Diamondbacks ===
He was claimed off waivers by the Arizona Diamondbacks on April 6. He was called up on May 12 for a start against the Washington Nationals. He walked 6 batters in under 4 innings, ending with a no decision. After the game, he was sent down to AAA. He was released by the Diamondbacks on July 2, 2018. On July 13, 2018, Scribner re-signed with Arizona on a minor league deal. He was released on May 7, 2019.

=== Sugar Land Skeeters ===
On May 17, 2019, Scribner signed with the Sugar Land Skeeters of the Atlantic League of Professional Baseball. He became a free agent following the season. In 22 starts 122.1 innings he went 6-7 with a 3.68 ERA with 127 strikeouts.

== Personal life ==
His brother, Evan Scribner, last played in Major League Baseball for the Seattle Mariners.
