= Keynan Middleton =

American baseball player (born 1993)

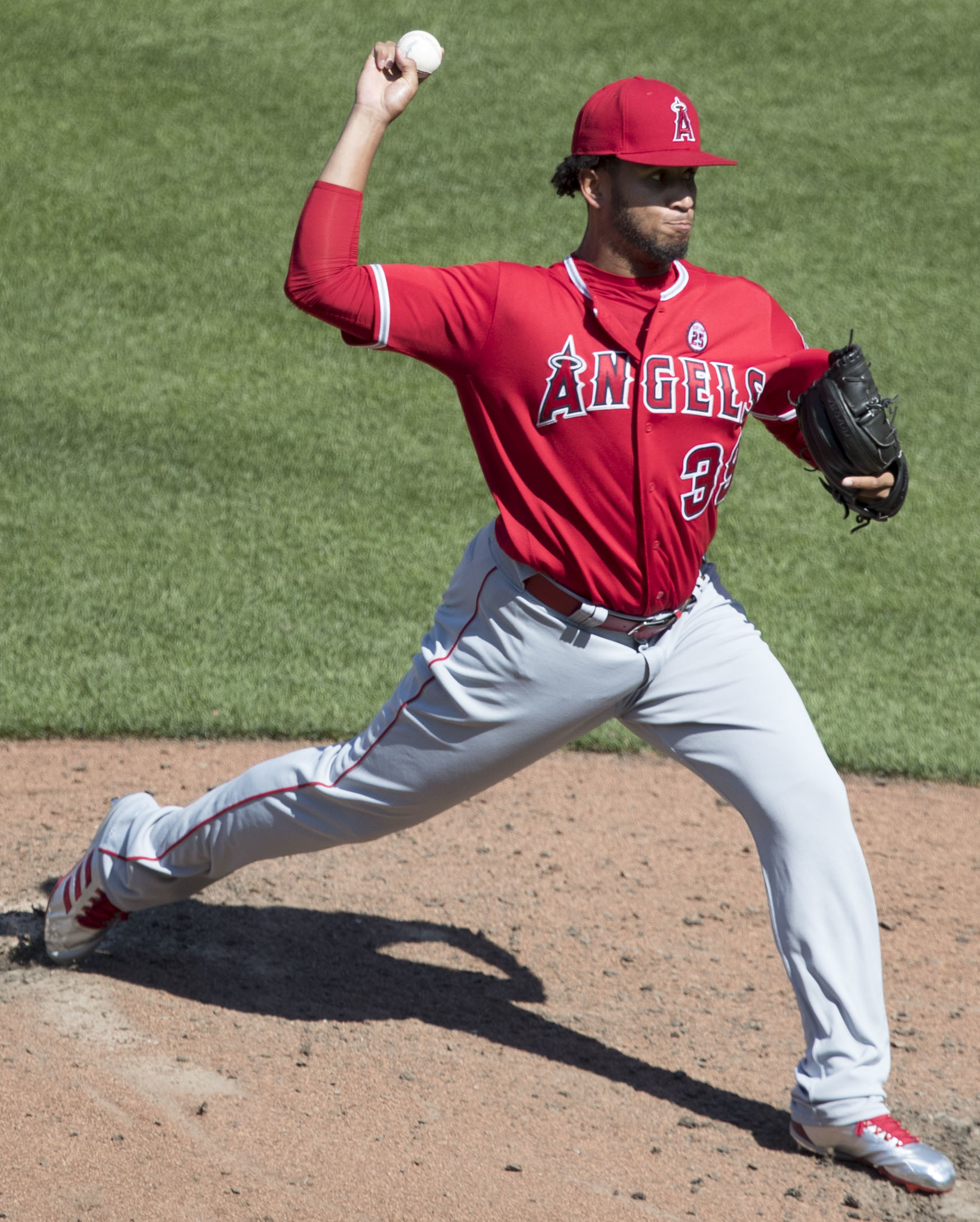
- Middleton with the Los Angeles Angels in 2017

Free agent
- Pitcher
- Born: September 12, 1993 (age 33); Portland, Oregon, U.S.
- Bats: Right Throws: Right

MLB debut
- May 5, 2017, for the Los Angeles Angels

MLB statistics (through 2023 season)
- Win–loss record: 10–8
- Earned run average: 3.84
- Strikeouts: 199
- Stats at Baseball Reference

Teams
- Los Angeles Angels (2017–2020); Seattle Mariners (2021); Arizona Diamondbacks (2022); Chicago White Sox (2023); New York Yankees (2023)

Keynan Anthony Middleton (born September 12, 1993) is an American professional baseball pitcher who is a free agent. He has previously played in Major League Baseball (MLB) for the Los Angeles Angels, Seattle Mariners, Arizona Diamondbacks, Chicago White Sox, and New York Yankees. Middleton was drafted by the Angels in the third round of the 2013 MLB draft and made his MLB debut with them in 2017.

== High school and college ==
Middleton attended Milwaukie High School in Milwaukie, Oregon. He later played college baseball at Lane Community College. He was drafted by the Los Angeles Angels in the third round (95th overall) of the 2013 Major League Baseball draft.

== Career ==
=== Los Angeles Angels ===
Middleton made his professional debut with the rookie-level Arizona League Angels and was promoted to the rookie-level Orem Owlz during the season. Middleton spent 2014 with the Orem and played with the Single-A Burlington Bees in 2015. He began the 2016 season with the High-A Inland Empire 66ers and was subsequently promoted to the Double-A Arkansas Travelers and Triple-A Salt Lake Bees. Between the three affiliates, he recorded a 1–2 record with a 3.41 ERA, averaging 12 strikeouts per 9 innings.

Middleton made his MLB debut on May 5, 2017, allowing a run while striking out one in an inning of work. On June 11, he earned his first career win in an inning of relief against the Houston Astros. Middleton picked up his first career save on August 8, in a 3–2 victory over the Baltimore Orioles. After striking out the first two batters he faced, he yielded a solo home run to Orioles catcher Caleb Joseph but managed to secure the final out by getting outfielder Joey Rickard to pop out on the infield. He finished the season with a 6–1 record and 3 saves in 64 games, averaging 9.7 strikeouts per 9 innings. Middleton's 64 appearances ranked as the third-most-ever by an Angels rookie, and he led AL rookies with an average fastball velocity of 97.2 miles per hour.

Middleton began the 2018 season as the closer for the Angels. On May 14, Middleton was placed on the disabled list for the second time in the year due to suspected damage to the UCL in his right elbow. On May 17, it was announced that he would undergo Tommy John surgery, which ended his season. Middleton finished the year with six saves in 16 appearances, a 2.04 ERA, and 16 strikeouts in 17 2/3 innings.

On August 27, 2019, Middleton was activated from the injured list to make his return from surgery. He appeared in 11 games down the stretch for the Angels, recording a 1.17 ERA with six strikeouts across 7 2/3 innings pitched.

Middleton made 13 appearances for Los Angeles during the truncated 2020 campaign, compiling an 0-1 record and 5.25 ERA with 11 strikeouts over 12 innings of work. On December 2, 2020, Middleton was non-tendered by the Angels, and subsequently became a free agent.

=== Seattle Mariners ===
On December 16, 2020, Middleton signed an $800K major league contract with the Seattle Mariners. He appeared in 32 games for the Mariners, posting a 4.94 ERA with 24 strikeouts. On August 26, 2021, he was designated for assignment by the Mariners. Two days later, on August 28, he cleared waivers and was assigned outright to the Triple-A Tacoma Rainiers. On October 8, Middleton elected free agency.

=== Arizona Diamondbacks ===
On January 13, 2022, Middleton signed a minor league contract with the Arizona Diamondbacks. He was assigned to the Triple-A Reno Aces to begin the year. On April 29, Middleton had his contract selected to the 40-man and active rosters. In 18 relief appearances for Arizona, he logged a 1-2 record and 5.29 ERA with 15 strikeouts over 17 innings of work. On November 3, Middleton was removed from the 40-man roster and sent outright to Reno; he subsequently elected free agency in lieu of the assignment.

=== Chicago White Sox ===
On January 15, 2023, Middleton signed a minor league contract with the Chicago White Sox. He was assigned to the Triple-A Charlotte Knights to begin the year, recording three strikeouts in three scoreless innings pitched. On April 10, Middleton had his contract selected to the active roster. In 39 appearances for the White Sox, he posted a 2-2 record and 3.96 ERA with 47 strikeouts and two saves over 36 1/3 innings of work.

=== New York Yankees ===
On August 1, 2023, Middleton was traded to the New York Yankees in exchange for Juan Carela. In 12 appearances for New York, he recorded a 1.88 ERA with 17 strikeouts across 14 1/3 innings pitched. Middleton became a free agent following the season.

=== St. Louis Cardinals ===
On February 3, 2024, Middleton signed a one-year contract with the St. Louis Cardinals, that included a club option for the 2025 season. He began the year in the injured list with a right forearm strain, later receiving a platelet-rich plasma injection; he would go on to make five rehab appearances for the Double-A Springfield Cardinals. On June 4, Middleton underwent season–ending surgery to repair his flexor tendon. The Cardinals declined his option on October 31, making him a free agent.

=== Long Island Ducks ===
On July 11, 2025, Middleton signed with the Long Island Ducks of the Atlantic League of Professional Baseball. He made four scoreless appearances for Long Island, recording four strikeouts over 3 2/3 innings of relief.

=== Los Angeles Dodgers ===
On February 27, 2026, Middleton signed a minor league contract with the Los Angeles Dodgers and was assigned to the Triple–A Oklahoma City Comets to begin the regular season. He pitched in 29 games for Oklahoma City, posting a 2–2 record and 4.75 ERA with 24 strikeouts and two saves across 30 1/3 innings pitched. Middleton was released by Los Angeles on July 20.
