= MiLBY Awards =

The Minor League Baseball Yearly (MiLBY) Awards are given annually to the most outstanding players, teams, single-game performances, plays, moments, homers, and promotions of the year. Initiated by Minor League Baseball in 2005 as the "This Year in Minor League Baseball Awards", the awards were renamed the "MiLBY Awards" in 2008. Baseball fans select the nominees for and winners of the awards, via the online voting system on MiLB.com, the official website of Minor League Baseball.

== 2005–2009 ==
2005
See footnote

- Offensive Player: Brandon Wood, R. Cucamonga
- Starting Pitcher: Justin Verlander, Lakeland
- Relief Pitcher: Jermaine Van Buren, Iowa
- Foreign-Born Player: Francisco Liriano, Rochester
- Breakthrough Performer: Rich Hill, Iowa
- Team: Jacksonville Suns
- Single-Game Performance: Ian Snell, Indianapolis

2006
See footnote

2007
See footnote

2008
See footnote

- Overall Best Hitter: Matt Wieters, (Baltimore Orioles)
- Overall Best Starter: Jhoulys Chacín, (Colorado Rockies)
- Overall Best Reliever: Rob Delaney (Minnesota Twins)
- Overall Best Single-Game Performance: Micah Hoffpauir (Chicago Cubs)
- Overall Best Team: Augusta GreenJackets (San Francisco Giants)

2009
See footnote

- Overall Best Hitter: Chris Carter (Oakland A's)
- Best Hitter (Triple-A):
- Best Hitter (Double-A):
- Best Hitter (Class A Advanced):
- Best Hitter (Class A):
- Best Hitter (Short Season):
- Overall Best Starter: Dan Hudson (Chicago White Sox)
- Best Starter (Triple-A):
- Best Starter (Double-A):
- Best Starter (Class A Advanced):
- Best Starter (Class A):
- Best Starter (Short Season):
- Overall Best Reliever: Dan Runzler (San Francisco Giants)
- Best Reliever (Triple-A):
- Best Reliever (Double-A):
- Best Reliever (Class A Advanced):
- Best Reliever (Class A):
- Best Reliever (Short Season):
- Overall Best Single Game: Jeanmar Gómez (Cleveland Indians)
- Best Single Game (Triple-A):
- Best Single Game (Double-A):
- Best Single Game (Class A Advanced):
- Best Single Game (Class A):
- Best Single Game (Short Season):
- Overall Best Team: Fort Wayne TinCaps (San Diego Padres)
- Best Team (Triple-A):
- Best Team (Double-A):
- Best Team (Class A Advanced):
- Best Team (Class A):
- Best Team (Short Season):

== 2010–2014 ==
2010
See footnote

- Best Starter (Triple-A): Brandon Dickson, Memphis
- Best Starter (Double-A): Elih Villanueva, Jacksonville
- Best Starter (Class A Advanced): Anthony Bass, Lake Elsinore
- Best Starter (Class A – Full Season): Matt Magill, Great Lakes
- Best Starter (Class A – Short Season): Yohan Almonte, Brooklyn
- Best Hitter (Triple-A): Brad Snyder, Iowa
- Best Hitter (Double-A): Tagg Bozied, Reading
- Best Hitter (Class A Advanced): Tyler Moore, Potomac
- Best Hitter (Class A – Full Season): J. D. Martinez, Lexington
- Best Hitter (Class A – Short Season): Corey Dickerson, Casper
- Best Reliever (Triple-A): Jonathan Albaladejo, Scranton/Wilkes-Barre
- Best Reliever (Double-A): Brandon Gomes, San Antonio
- Best Reliever (Class A Advanced): Matt Daly, Dunedin
- Best Reliever (Class A – Full Season): Josh Zeid, Lakewood
- Best Reliever (Class A – Short Season): Chase Whitley, Staten Island
- Best Single Game (Triple-A): R. A. Dickey, Buffalo
- Best Single Game (Double-A): Kyle Drabek, New Hampshire
- Best Single Game (Class A Advanced): Nathan Moreau, Frederick
- Best Single Game (Class A – Full Season): Jake Brigham, Hickory
- Best Single Game (Class A – Short Season): Daniel Adamson, Tri-City
- Best Team (Triple-A): Columbus Clippers (International League)
- Best Team (Double-A): Trenton Thunder (Eastern League)
- Best Team (Class A Advanced): Tampa Yankees (Florida State League)
- Best Team (Class A – Full Season): Great Lakes Loons (Midwest League)
- Best Team (Class A – Short Season): Helena Brewers (Pioneer League)

2011
Note: In 2011, MiLB re-named one category ("Game", instead of "Single Game") and added four new categories, for a total of nine categories. In three of the new categories (Play of the Year, Moment of the Year, and Homer of the Year), one overall winner is chosen for all of minor-league baseball. In the fourth new category (Promo of the Year), there are overall winners in each of five subcategories: Best Promotion (of all types), Best Theme Night, Best Giveaway, Best Celebrity Appearance, and Best Miscellaneous Promotion.

- Best Starter (Triple-A): Graham Godfrey, Sacramento
- Best Starter (Double-A): Garrett Richards, Arkansas
- Best Starter (Class A Advanced): Darin Gorski, St. Lucie
- Best Starter (Class A – Full Season): Josh Smith, Dayton
- Best Starter (Class A – Short Season): Brennan Smith, Connecticut
- Best Hitter (Triple-A): Bryan LaHair, Iowa
- Best Hitter (Double-A): Tim Wheeler, Tulsa
- Best Hitter (Class A Advanced): Ian Gac, Winston-Salem
- Best Hitter (Class A – Full Season): Derek Dietrich, Bowling Green
- Best Hitter (Class A – Short Season): Taylor Lindsey, Orem
- Best Reliever (Triple-A): Rob Delaney, Durham
- Best Reliever (Double-A): Cory Burns, Akron
- Best Reliever (Class A Advanced): Preston Guilmet, Kinston
- Best Reliever (Class A – Full Season): Drew Hayes, Dayton
- Best Reliever (Class A – Short Season): Logan Billbrough, Johnson City
- Best Team (Triple-A): Columbus Clippers (International League)
- Best Team (Double-A): New Hampshire Fisher Cats (Eastern League)
- Best Team (Class A Advanced): Kinston Indians (Carolina League)
- Best Team (Class A – Full Season): Greensboro Grasshoppers (South Atlantic League)
- Best Team (Class A – Short Season): Vancouver Canadians (Northwest League)

== See also ==
- Minor League Baseball § Awards
- Baseball awards § U.S. minor leagues
- Baseball America minor-league awards
- Esurance MLB Awards (formerly "This Year in Baseball Awards" and then the "GIBBY Awards") (Major League Baseball)

Player of the year awards

- Baseball America Minor League Player of the Year Award
- The Sporting News Minor League Player of the Year Award
- USA Today Minor League Player of the Year Award
- Topps Minor League Player of the Year Award
