= USA Today Minor League Player of the Year Award =

Professional baseball sports award

- Sport: Baseball
- League: Minor League Baseball
- Awarded for: Player of the Year
- Country: United States, Canada, Mexico
- Presented by: USA Today

History
- First award: 1988
- First winner: Mike Harkey
- Most wins: Andruw Jones (1995, 1996)
- Most recent: Konnor Griffin (2025)

Listed below in chronological order are the Minor League Baseball players chosen by USA Today as recipients of the USA Today Minor League Player of the Year Award. Since 1988, the award has been given annually to the minor-league player who is judged by USA Today baseball experts as having had the most outstanding season. Of the 13 votes cast each year, two votes go to the player selected by fans in online voting at USAToday.com.

== Winners ==
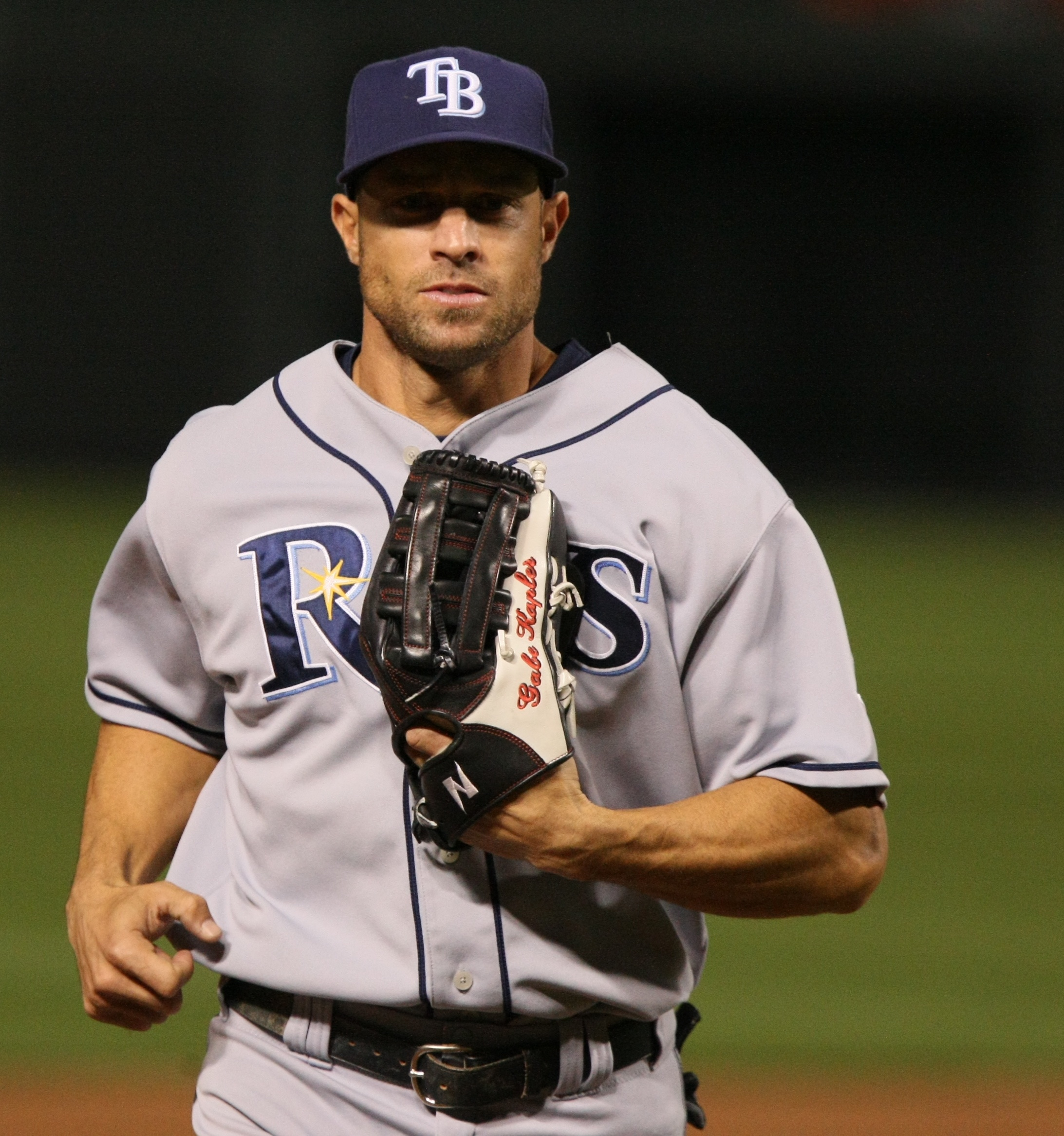
Gabe Kapler

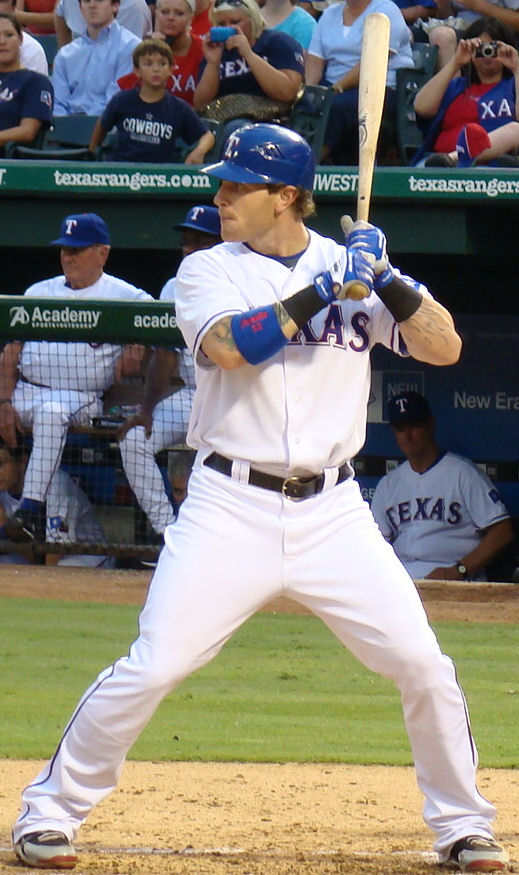
Josh Hamilton

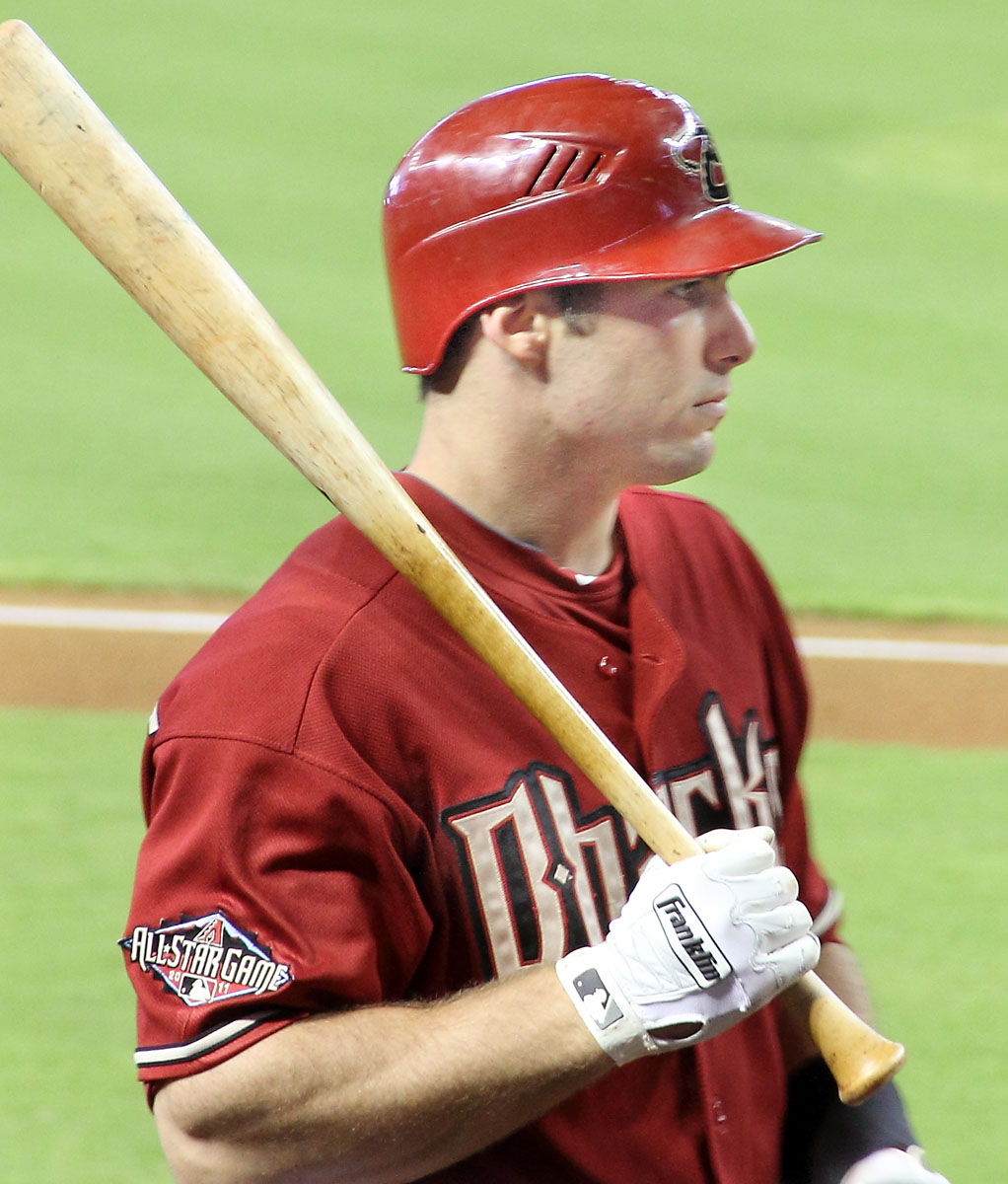
Paul Goldschmidt

Year	Player	Position	Organization	Ref.
1988	Mike Harkey	RHP	Chicago Cubs	
1989	Todd Zeile	C/1B/3B	St. Louis Cardinals	
1990	Tino Martinez	1B	Seattle Mariners	
1991	Mark Wohlers	RHP	Atlanta Braves	
1992	Carlos Delgado	1B	Toronto Blue Jays	
1993	Cliff Floyd	OF	Montreal Expos	
1994	Billy Ashley	OF	Los Angeles Dodgers	
1995	Andruw Jones (1)	OF	Atlanta Braves	
1996	Andruw Jones (2)	OF	Atlanta Braves	
1997	Ben Grieve	OF	Oakland Athletics	
1998	Gabe Kapler	OF	Detroit Tigers	
1999	Rick Ankiel	LHP	St. Louis Cardinals	
2000	Josh Hamilton	OF	Tampa Bay Devil Rays	
2001	Josh Beckett	RHP	Florida Marlins	
2002	José Reyes	SS	New York Mets	
2003	Prince Fielder	1B	Milwaukee Brewers	
2004	Jeff Francis	LHP	Colorado Rockies	
2005	Francisco Liriano	LHP	Minnesota Twins	
2006	Matt Garza	RHP	Minnesota Twins	
2007	Justin Upton	OF	Arizona Diamondbacks	
2008	David Price	LHP	Tampa Bay Rays	
2009	Jason Heyward	OF	Atlanta Braves	
2010	Jeremy Hellickson	RHP	Tampa Bay Rays	
2011	Paul Goldschmidt	1B	Arizona Diamondbacks	
2012	Wil Myers	OF	Kansas City Royals	
2013	Xander Bogaerts	SS	Boston Red Sox	
2014	Kris Bryant	3B	Chicago Cubs	
2015	Blake Snell	LHP	Tampa Bay Rays	
2016	Alex Bregman	SS	Houston Astros	
2017	Ronald Acuña	OF	Atlanta Braves	
2018	Vladimir Guerrero Jr.	3B	Toronto Blue Jays	
2019	Luis Robert	OF	Chicago White Sox	
2020	No season due to COVID-19 pandemic			
2021	Bobby Witt Jr.	SS	Kansas City Royals	
2022	Corbin Carroll	OF	Arizona Diamondbacks	
2023	Jackson Holliday	SS	Baltimore Orioles	
2024	Kristian Campbell	MI/OF	Boston Red Sox	
2025	Konnor Griffin	SS	Pittsburgh Pirates	

== See also ==
- Baseball America Minor League Player of the Year Award
- The Sporting News Minor League Player of the Year Award
- Topps Minor League Player of the Year Award
- Minor League Baseball Yearly (MiLBY) Awards (formerly "This Year in Minor League Baseball Awards")
- Minor League Baseball § Awards
- Baseball awards § U.S. minor leagues
