= Tim Pyznarski =

American baseball player (born 1960)

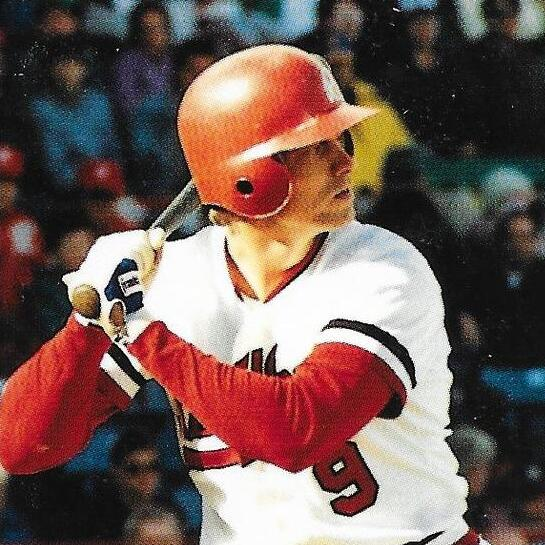
- Pyznarski with the Rochester Red Wings c. 1988
- First baseman
- Born: February 4, 1960 (age 66); Chicago, Illinois, U.S.
- Batted: Right Threw: Right

MLB debut
- September 14, 1986, for the San Diego Padres

Last MLB appearance
- October 5, 1986, for the San Diego Padres

MLB statistics
- Batting average: .238
- Home runs: 0
- Runs batted in: 0
- Stats at Baseball Reference

Teams
- San Diego Padres (1986)

Timothy Matthew Pyznarski (born February 4, 1960) is an American former professional baseball player, who played in Major League Baseball (MLB) for the San Diego Padres in 1986. He was selected 15th in the first round of the 1981 MLB draft by the Oakland Athletics.

Pyznarski grew up on the South side of Chicago, attending Marist High School. Pyznarski led Marist to the IHSA Class AA State Championship in 1978. He then went on to attend Eastern Illinois University, where he set several offensive records with the Eastern Illinois Panthers baseball team. After a successful career in Minor League Baseball, highlighted by The Sporting News Minor League Player of the Year Award and Topps Minor League Player of the Year Award in 1986, Pyznarski had a brief stint in the majors, appearing in 15 games for the 1986 San Diego Padres, where he compiled a .238 batting average (10-for-42).

Pyznarski was an assistant coach at Marist, and has 3 daughters and 5 grandkids. He went into the metal finishing industry as a salesman a few years after retiring from professional baseball.

== Career ==
He played in MLB for the San Diego Padres (1986) and the Modesto A's (1981), West Haven A's (1982), Albany A's (1983), Tacoma Tigers (1984), Las Vegas Stars (1985–86), and Denver Zephyrs, Rochester Red Wings and Omaha Royals. His 1987 Topps baseball card stated he was 6'2", weighed 195 pounds and batted and threw right handed.
