= Jason Stokes =

American baseball player

- First baseman
- Born: January 23, 1982 (age 44); Irving, Texas, U.S.
- Bats: Right Throws: Right
- Stats at Baseball Reference

Jason Stokes (born January 23, 1982) is an American former professional baseball player. Primarily a first baseman, he played in Minor League Baseball for the Oakland Athletics and Florida Marlins organizations.

== Biography ==
As a senior for Coppell High School in Coppell, Texas, Stokes hit 25 home runs, which still stands as the state single-season home run record. Stokes won the Gatorade High School Baseball Player of the Year Award in 2000.

Stokes was selected in the second round of the 2000 Major League Baseball draft by the Florida Marlins. His best season in the minor leagues was in 2002 with the Kane County Cougars, where he compiled a .341 batting average with 27 home runs and 75 runs batted in, earning Stokes both The Sporting News Minor League Player of the Year Award and the Topps Minor League Player of the Year Award. Stokes participated in the 2002 All-Star Futures Game during All-Star Weekend, playing for the United States team. He was ranked as the Marlins number four prospect and "Best Power Prospect" entering the 2005 season according to Baseball America.

Injuries plagued Stokes' career. His seasons with the Triple-A Albuquerque Isotopes in 2005 and 2006 were cut short due to hand and groin injuries. After being traded to the Oakland Athletics organization in early 2007, Stokes played 18 games with the Triple-A Sacramento River Cats, but again went on the disabled list with a back injury. Due to accumulating injuries, Stokes retired from baseball at the end of the 2007 season.

Attempting a comeback, Stokes signed a minor league contract with the Detroit Tigers in January 2010. He participated in spring training with the Tigers but was released on March 31 after suffering a groin injury. Later that season, after playing for the independent Grand Prairie AirHogs for 22 games, Stokes again retired. He hit a total of 96 home runs in his minor league career.
