= The Sporting News Minor League Player of the Year Award =

American baseball award (1936–2007)

- Sport: Baseball
- League: Minor League Baseball
- Awarded for: Player of the Year
- Country: United States, Canada, Mexico
- Presented by: The Sporting News (Note: In 2002, The Sporting News adjusted their name to Sporting News.)

History
- First award: 1936
- First winner: Johnny Vander Meer
- Most wins: Gene Conley (1951, 1953); Sandy Alomar Jr. (1988, 1989)
- Most recent: Jay Bruce (2007)

The Sporting News Minor League Player of the Year Award was presented annually by The Sporting News to a player in Minor League Baseball deemed to have had the most outstanding season. It was awarded annually starting in 1936, and was last known to have been awarded in 2007.

== Winners ==
The first winner of the award, Johnny Vander Meer, subsequently pitched in Major League Baseball (MLB) and is best known for pitching back-to-back no-hitters in 1938. Several winners of the award are inductees of the National Baseball Hall of Fame: Johnny Bench, Vladimir Guerrero, Derek Jeter, Pedro Martínez, Tim Raines, Jim Rice, and Phil Rizzuto. Two players won the award twice: Gene Conley (1951, 1953) and Sandy Alomar Jr. (1988, 1989). There was one tie, occurring in 1988 when Alomar Jr. shared the honor with Gary Sheffield. Each winner of the award went on to play in MLB, with the exception of Jason Stokes, who won the award in 2002 while in Class A and later reached the Triple-A level.

Key
‡	Member of the National Baseball Hall of Fame
^	Multiple award winners in the same season

Year	Name	Position	Highest level	MLB organization
1936	Johnny Vander Meer	Pitcher	A1	Cincinnati Reds
1937	Charlie Keller	Outfielder	AA	New York Yankees
1938	Fred Hutchinson	Pitcher	AA	—N/a
1939	Lou Novikoff	Outfielder	AA	Chicago Cubs
1940	Phil Rizzuto ‡	Shortstop	AA	New York Yankees
1941	Johnny Lindell	Pitcher	AA	New York Yankees
1942	Dick Barrett	Pitcher	AA	—N/a
1943	Chet Covington	Pitcher	AA	Boston Red Sox
1944	Ripper Collins	First baseman	A	Pittsburgh Pirates
1945	Gil Coan	Outfielder	A1	Washington Senators
1946	Sibby Sisti	Shortstop	AAA	Boston Braves
1947	Hank Sauer	Outfielder	AAA	Cincinnati Reds
1948	Gene Woodling	Outfielder	AAA	—N/a
1949	Orie Arntzen	Pitcher	A	Pittsburgh Pirates
1950	Frank Saucier	Outfielder	AAA	St. Louis Browns
1951	Gene Conley	Pitcher	A	Boston Braves
1952	Bill Skowron	First baseman	AAA	New York Yankees
1953	Gene Conley (2)	Pitcher	AAA	Milwaukee Braves
1954	Herb Score	Pitcher	AAA	Cleveland Indians
1955	Red Murff	Pitcher	AA	New York Giants
1956	Steve Bilko	First baseman	Open	Chicago Cubs
1957	Norm Siebern	Outfielder	AAA	New York Yankees
1958	Jim O'Toole	Pitcher	AA	Cincinnati Reds
1959	Frank Howard	First baseman	AAA	Los Angeles Dodgers
1960	Willie Davis	Outfielder	AAA	Los Angeles Dodgers
1961	Howie Koplitz	Pitcher	AA	Detroit Tigers
1962	Bob Bailey	Third baseman	AAA	Pittsburgh Pirates
1963	Don Buford	Third baseman	AAA	Chicago White Sox
1964	Mel Stottlemyre	Pitcher	AAA	New York Yankees
1965	Joe Foy	Third baseman	AAA	Boston Red Sox
1966	Mike Epstein	Outfielder	AAA	Baltimore Orioles
1967	Johnny Bench ‡	Catcher	AAA	Cincinnati Reds
1968	Merv Rettenmund	Outfielder	AAA	Baltimore Orioles
1969	Danny Walton	Outfielder	AAA	Houston Astros
1970	Don Baylor	Outfielder	AAA	Baltimore Orioles
1971	Bobby Grich	Shortstop	AAA	Baltimore Orioles
1972	Tom Paciorek	First baseman	AAA	Los Angeles Dodgers
1973	Steve Ontiveros	Outfielder	AAA	San Francisco Giants
1974	Jim Rice ‡	Outfielder	AAA	Boston Red Sox
1975	Héctor Cruz	Third baseman	AAA	St. Louis Cardinals
1976	Pat Putnam	First baseman	A	Texas Rangers
1977	Ken Landreaux	Outfielder	AAA	California Angels
1978	Champ Summers	Outfielder	AAA	Cincinnati Reds
1979	Mark Bomback	Pitcher	AAA	Milwaukee Brewers
1980	Tim Raines ‡	Second baseman	AAA	Montreal Expos
1981	Mike Marshall	First baseman	AAA	Los Angeles Dodgers
1982	Ron Kittle	Outfielder	AAA	Chicago White Sox
1983	Kevin McReynolds	Outfielder	AAA	San Diego Padres
1984	Alan Knicely	First baseman	AAA	Cincinnati Reds
1985	Jose Canseco	Outfielder	AAA	Oakland Athletics
1986	Tim Pyznarski	First baseman	AAA	San Diego Padres
1987	Randy Milligan	First baseman	AAA	New York Mets
1988^	Sandy Alomar Jr.	Catcher	AAA	San Diego Padres
1988^	Gary Sheffield	Shortstop	AAA	Milwaukee Brewers
1989	Sandy Alomar Jr. (2)	Catcher	AAA	San Diego Padres
1990	José Offerman	Shortstop	AAA	Los Angeles Dodgers
1991	Pedro Martínez ‡	Pitcher	AAA	Los Angeles Dodgers
1992	Tim Salmon	Outfielder	AAA	California Angels
1993	Cliff Floyd	First baseman	AAA	Montreal Expos
1994	Derek Jeter ‡	Shortstop	AAA	New York Yankees
1995	Karim García	Outfielder	AAA	Los Angeles Dodgers
1996	Vladimir Guerrero ‡	Outfielder	AA	Montreal Expos
1997	Ben Grieve	Outfielder	AAA	Oakland Athletics
1998	Gabe Kapler	Outfielder	AA	Detroit Tigers
1999	Rick Ankiel	Pitcher	AAA	St. Louis Cardinals
2000	Jon Rauch	Pitcher	AA	Chicago White Sox
2001	Josh Beckett	Pitcher	AA	Florida Marlins
2002	Jason Stokes	First baseman	A	Florida Marlins
2003	Zack Greinke	Pitcher	AA	Kansas City Royals
2004	Dallas McPherson	Third baseman	AAA	Anaheim Angels
2005	Brandon Wood	Shortstop	AAA	Los Angeles Angels
2006	Alex Gordon	Third baseman	AA	Kansas City Royals
2007	Jay Bruce	Outfielder	AAA	Cincinnati Reds

== See also ==
- Baseball America Minor League Player of the Year Award
- USA Today Minor League Player of the Year Award
- Topps Minor League Player of the Year Award
