= Jeremy Hellickson =

American baseball player (born 1987)

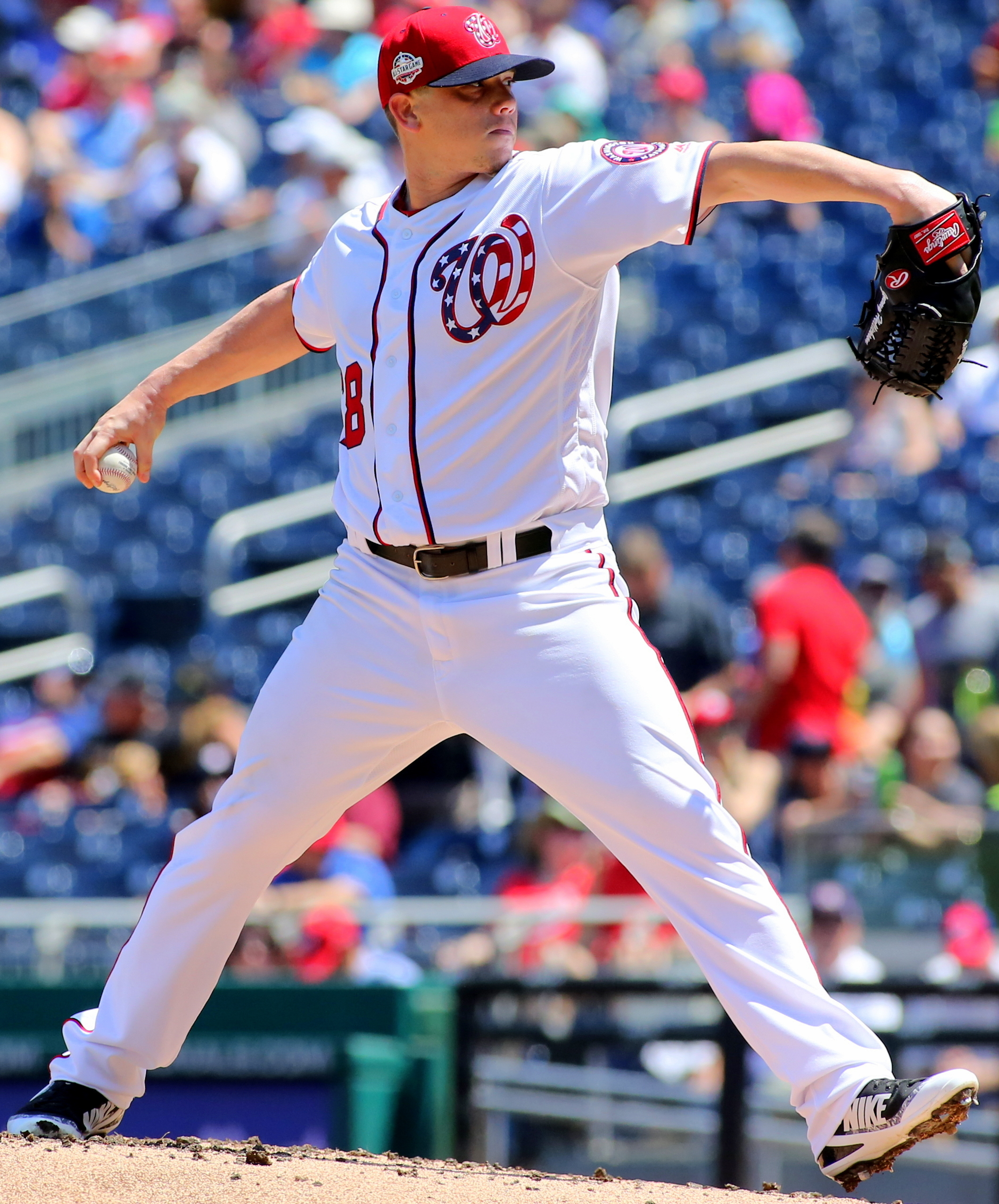
- Hellickson with the Washington Nationals in 2018
- Pitcher
- Born: April 8, 1987 (age 39); Des Moines, Iowa, U.S.
- Batted: Right Threw: Right

MLB debut
- August 2, 2010, for the Tampa Bay Rays

Last MLB appearance
- May 19, 2019, for the Washington Nationals

MLB statistics
- Win–loss record: 76–75
- Earned run average: 4.13
- Strikeouts: 929
- Stats at Baseball Reference

Teams
- Tampa Bay Rays (2010–2014); Arizona Diamondbacks (2015); Philadelphia Phillies (2016–2017); Baltimore Orioles (2017); Washington Nationals (2018–2019)

Career highlights and awards
- AL Rookie of the Year (2011); Gold Glove Award (2012)
Medals
Men's baseball
Representing United States
World Youth Baseball Championship
Gold medal – first place	2003 Kaohsiung	Team

Jeremy Robert Hellickson (born April 8, 1987) is an American former professional baseball pitcher. He played in Major League Baseball (MLB) for the Tampa Bay Rays, Arizona Diamondbacks, Philadelphia Phillies, Baltimore Orioles, and Washington Nationals. Following the 2011 season, Hellickson was named American League Rookie of the Year. In Tampa Bay, Hellickson was nicknamed "Hellboy" by local fans and media.

== Early life ==
Hellickson was born in Des Moines, Iowa and attended Hoover High School.

== Professional career ==
=== Minor leagues ===
Hellickson was drafted by Tampa Bay in the fourth round of the 2005 Major League Baseball draft. Baseball America rated him as the 18th best prospect in all of baseball going into the 2010 season. He was selected to play in the 2010 All-Star Futures Game and was the starting pitcher for U.S. team.

=== Tampa Bay Rays ===
On August 2, 2010, Hellickson made his major league debut against Minnesota Twins. During his debut, he held the Twins to two runs over seven innings. He struck out six while walking two. He was optioned back to the Triple-A Durham Bulls after the start. He was once again recalled to the majors on August 10 to take the spot of Wade Davis in the rotation. He made his second career start that day against the Detroit Tigers at Comerica Park, earning his second career victory after pitching seven shutout innings with three hits, seven strikeouts and no walks as the Rays won 8–0.

On August 21, 2010, Hellickson was optioned to the High-A Charlotte Stone Crabs to work on moving to the bullpen. He was recalled to Tampa Bay on September 1, and made his first appearance out of the bullpen on September 4, pitching 1 2/3 innings giving up 2 runs.

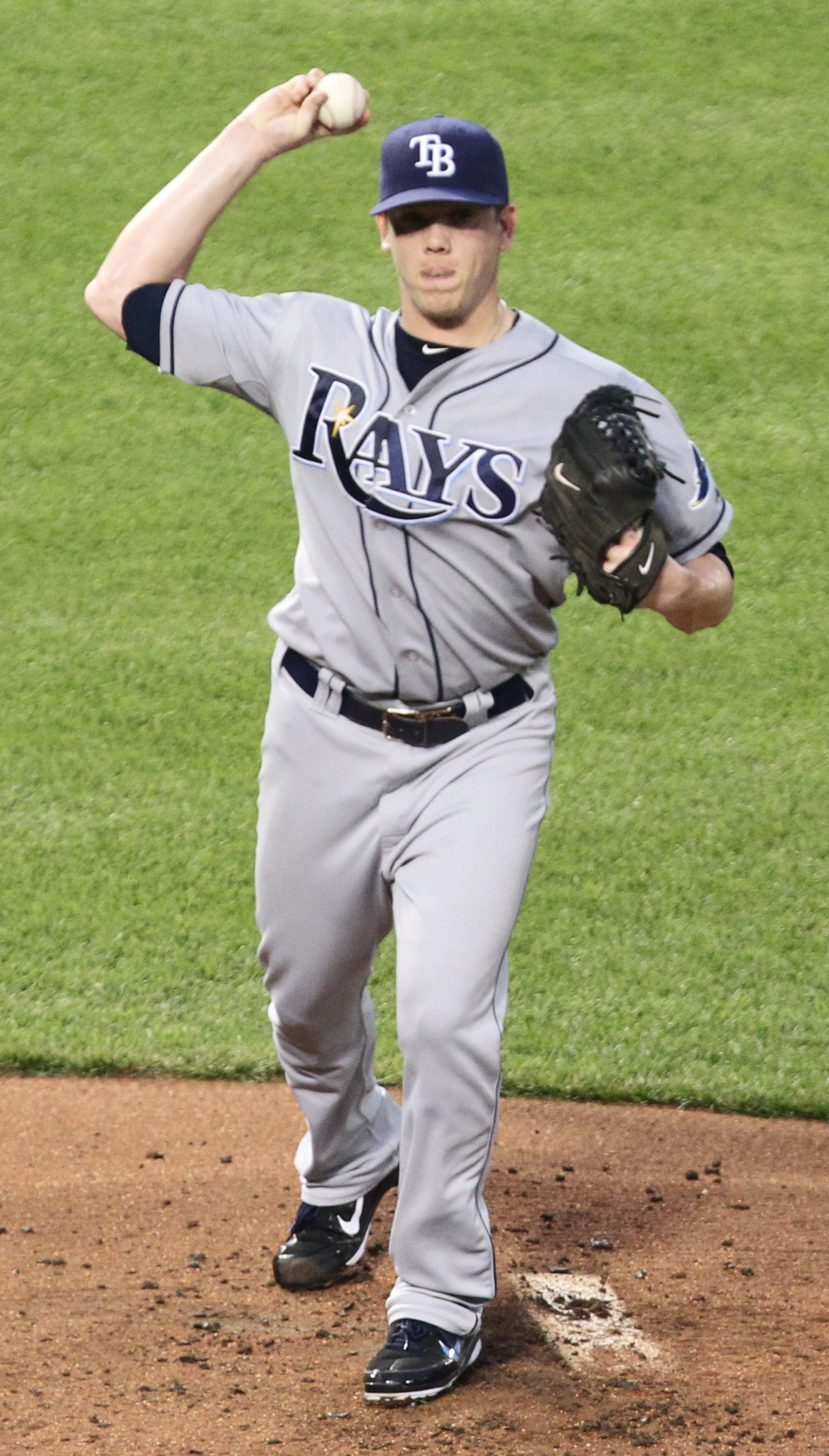
Hellickson pitching for the Tampa Bay Rays in 2011

Hellickson began the 2011 season as the Rays fifth starter. On May 13, he threw his first complete game, earning a 3–0 victory over the Baltimore Orioles. Following the season, Hellickson earned the 2011 American League MLB Rookie of the Year Award. He was named the Rays third starter for the 2012 season and pitched 8 2/3 shutout innings against the New York Yankees on April 8, 2012.

Hellickson was the losing pitcher in Félix Hernández's perfect game on August 15, 2012. He still had a quality start in the game, allowing one run and five hits over seven innings to the Seattle Mariners.

Hellickson was optioned to Charlotte on August 27. He was recalled from the Double-A Montgomery Biscuits on September 3 after the major league rosters expanded. He did not pitch for either minor league team.

He was named co-winner with Jake Peavy, then with the Chicago White Sox, of the American League Rawlings Gold Glove for 2012.

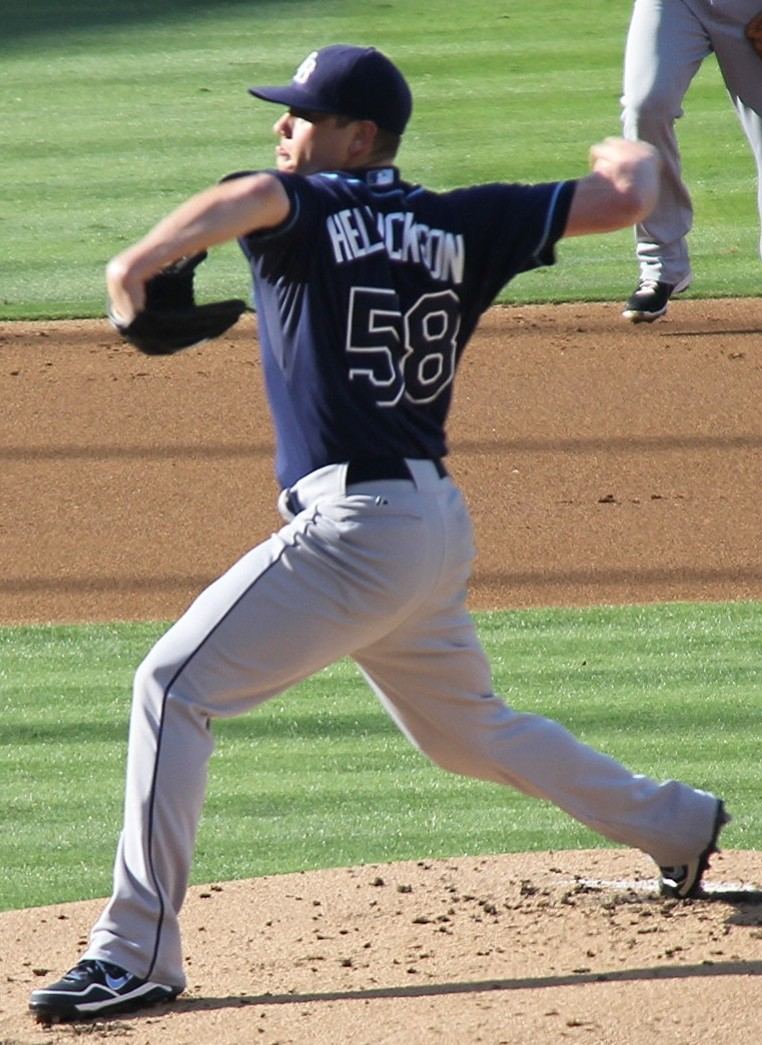
Hellickson pitching for the Tampa Bay Rays in 2013

=== Arizona Diamondbacks ===
On November 14, 2014, the Rays traded Hellickson to the Arizona Diamondbacks for Andrew Velazquez and Justin Williams. He signed a one-year deal worth $4.275 million on January 16, 2015, and avoided arbitration. In 27 starts, he finished 9–12 with an ERA of 4.62 in 146 innings.

=== Philadelphia Phillies ===
On November 14, 2015, Hellickson was traded to the Philadelphia Phillies for minor league pitcher Sam McWilliams. On January 15, 2016, Hellickson signed a one-year deal for $7 million avoiding arbitration. Hellickson started for the Phillies on Opening Day. The Phillies extended Hellickson a qualifying offer worth $17.2 million for the 2017 season, which he accepted.

On April 3, 2017, Hellickson was the starting pitcher against the Cincinnati Reds on Opening Day. He hit his first-career triple, the first pitcher to hit a triple in the season opener since San Francisco Giants' Jack Sanford in 1963. He pitched five innings earning the win, allowing one run and six hits. He left early because of running the triple.

=== Baltimore Orioles ===
On July 28, 2017, the Phillies traded Hellickson to the Baltimore Orioles for Hyun-soo Kim and Garrett Cleavinger.

In his first start as an Oriole, Hellickson threw seven shutout innings against the Royals, striking out three batters while earning the win in a 6–0 victory. Despite that hot start, Hellickson struggled down the stretch, posting a 5.43 ERA over 30 starts over the course of the season. For the 2017 season, between the two teams he led the majors in giving up the most home runs per nine innings (1.92). He became a free agent following the conclusion of the season.

=== Washington Nationals ===
On March 17, 2018, Hellickson signed a minor league contract with the Washington Nationals that included an invitation to major league spring training. His contract was selected on April 16 for a start against the New York Mets at Citi Field. In his Nationals debut, Hellickson worked into the fifth inning while giving up two runs, taking a no-decision as his team rallied in the eighth inning to win 8–6. He earned his first Nationals win on May 8, 2018, at PETCO Park, taking a perfect game bid into the seventh inning and allowing no runs in the two-hit outing, striking out eight San Diego Padres in the process. He began his tenure with Washington going 2–0 with a 2.28 ERA before landing on the disabled list with a hamstring strain. He ended the season with a 5–3 record in 91 1/3 innings.

On February 8, 2019, Hellickson re-signed with the Nationals, inking a one-year, $1.3 million contract with up to $4 million in incentives. In 9 appearances (8 starts) Hellickson went 2–3 with a 6.23 ERA before suffering a season-ending shoulder injury. The Nationals finished the 2019 year with a 93–69 record, clinching a wild card spot, and eventually went on to win the 2019 World Series over the Houston Astros, their first championship in franchise history. Although Hellickson did not participate in any postseason action, he won his first World Series championship.

Hellickson retired from baseball on February 14, 2020, after experiencing a shoulder setback prior to spring training.

== Achievements ==
- 2009 Triple-A Baseball National Championship Most Valuable Player
- Baseball America Minor League Player of the Year Award, 2010
- International League Most Valuable Pitcher, 2010
- USA Today Minor League Player of the Year Award, 2010
- American League Rookie of the Month – May 2011
- American League Pitcher of the Month – May 2011
- American League Rookie of the Year Award, 2011
- 2019 World Series champion

== Personal life ==
Hellickson and his wife Natalie reside in West Des Moines, Iowa.

== See also ==
- List of Major League Baseball single-inning strikeout leaders
- List of Philadelphia Phillies Opening Day starting pitchers
