= Baseball America Minor League Player of the Year Award =

Professional baseball sports award

- Sport: Baseball
- League: Minor League Baseball
- Awarded for: Player of the Year
- Country: United States, Canada, Mexico
- Presented by: Baseball America

History
- First award: 1981
- First winner: Mike Marshall
- Most wins: Gregg Jefferies (1986, 1987); Andruw Jones (1995, 1996)
- Most recent: Konnor Griffin (2025)

Listed below in chronological order are the Minor League Baseball players chosen by Baseball America as recipients of the Baseball America Minor League Player of the Year Award. Since 1981, the award has been given to one minor league player judged by a Baseball America panel of experts as having had the most outstanding season.

== List ==
Key
| † | Major League Baseball All-Star |
| ‡ | Member of the National Baseball Hall of Fame |

| Year | Name | Position | Highest level | MLB organization |
|---|---|---|---|---|
| 1981 | Mike Marshall | First baseman | AAA | Los Angeles Dodgers |
| 1982 | Ron Kittle | Outfielder | AAA | Chicago White Sox |
| 1983 | Dwight Gooden | Pitcher | A | New York Mets |
| 1984 | Mike Bielecki | Pitcher | AAA | Pittsburgh Pirates |
| 1985 | José Canseco | Outfielder | AAA | Oakland Athletics |
| 1986 | Gregg Jefferies (1) | Shortstop | AA | New York Mets |
| 1987 | Gregg Jefferies (2) | Shortstop | AAA | New York Mets |
| 1988 | Tom Gordon | Pitcher | AAA | Kansas City Royals |
| 1989 | Sandy Alomar Jr. | Catcher | AAA | San Diego Padres |
| 1990 | Frank Thomas‡ | First baseman | AA | Chicago White Sox |
| 1991 | Derek Bell | Outfielder | AAA | Toronto Blue Jays |
| 1992 | Tim Salmon | Outfielder | AAA | California Angels |
| 1993 | Manny Ramirez | Outfielder | AAA | Cleveland Indians |
| 1994 | Derek Jeter‡ | Shortstop | AAA | New York Yankees |
| 1995 | Andruw Jones (1)‡ | Outfielder | A | Atlanta Braves |
| 1996 | Andruw Jones (2)‡ | Outfielder | AAA | Atlanta Braves |
| 1997 | Paul Konerko | First baseman | AAA | Los Angeles Dodgers |
| 1998 | Eric Chavez | Third baseman | AAA | Oakland Athletics |
| 1999 | Rick Ankiel | Pitcher | AAA | St. Louis Cardinals |
| 2000 | Jon Rauch | Pitcher | AA | Chicago White Sox |
| 2001 | Josh Beckett | Pitcher | AA | Florida Marlins |
| 2002 | Rocco Baldelli | Outfielder | AAA | Tampa Bay Devil Rays |
| 2003 | Joe Mauer‡ | Catcher | AA | Minnesota Twins |
| 2004 | Jeff Francis | Pitcher | AAA | Colorado Rockies |
| 2005 | Delmon Young | Outfielder | AAA | Tampa Bay Devil Rays |
| 2006 | Alex Gordon | Third baseman | AA | Kansas City Royals |
| 2007 | Jay Bruce | Outfielder | AAA | Cincinnati Reds |
| 2008 | Matt Wieters | Catcher | AA | Baltimore Orioles |
| 2009 | Jason Heyward | Outfielder | AAA | Atlanta Braves |
| 2010 | Jeremy Hellickson | Pitcher | AAA | Tampa Bay Rays |
| 2011 | Mike Trout | Outfielder | AA | Los Angeles Angels of Anaheim |
| 2012 | Wil Myers | Outfielder | AAA | Kansas City Royals |
| 2013 | Byron Buxton | Outfielder | A | Minnesota Twins |
| 2014 | Kris Bryant | Third basemen | AAA | Chicago Cubs |
| 2015 | Blake Snell | Pitcher | AAA | Tampa Bay Rays |
| 2016 | Yoan Moncada | Second baseman | AA | Boston Red Sox |
| 2017 | Ronald Acuna | Outfielder | AAA | Atlanta Braves |
| 2018 | Vladimir Guerrero Jr. | Third baseman | AAA | Toronto Blue Jays |
| 2019 | Gavin Lux | Shortstop | AAA | Los Angeles Dodgers |
| 2020 | No minor league season due to COVID-19 pandemic | | | |
| 2021 | Bobby Witt Jr. | Shortstop | AAA | Kansas City Royals |
| 2022 | Gunnar Henderson | Shortstop | AAA | Baltimore Orioles |
| 2023 | Jackson Holliday | Shortstop | AAA | Baltimore Orioles |
| 2024 | Kristian Campbell | Shortstop | AAA | Boston Red Sox |
| 2025 | Konnor Griffin | Shortstop | AA | Pittsburgh Pirates |

== See also ==
- The Sporting News Minor League Player of the Year Award
- USA Today Minor League Player of the Year Award
- Topps Minor League Player of the Year Award
- Minor League Baseball Yearly (MiLBY) Awards (formerly "This Year in Minor League Baseball Awards")
- Minor League Baseball #Awards
- Baseball awards#U.S. minor leagues
- Baseball America awards
