= Jay Bruce =

American baseball player (born 1987)

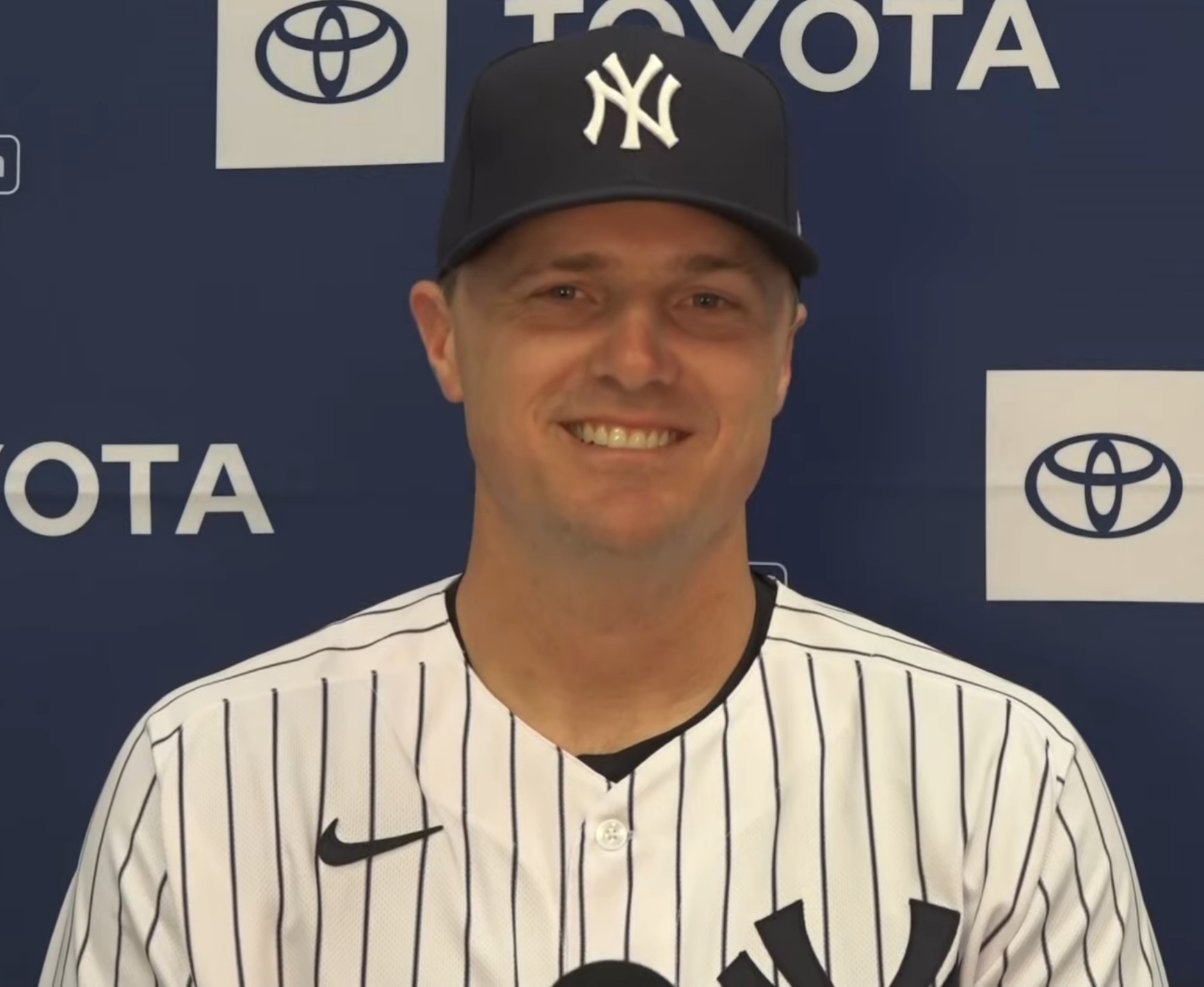
- Bruce with the New York Yankees in 2021
- Right fielder
- Born: April 3, 1987 (age 39); Beaumont, Texas, U.S.
- Batted: Left Threw: Left

MLB debut
- May 27, 2008, for the Cincinnati Reds

Last MLB appearance
- April 14, 2021, for the New York Yankees

MLB statistics
- Batting average: .244
- Home runs: 319
- Runs batted in: 951
- Stats at Baseball Reference

Teams
- Cincinnati Reds (2008–2016); New York Mets (2016–2017); Cleveland Indians (2017); New York Mets (2018); Seattle Mariners (2019); Philadelphia Phillies (2019–2020); New York Yankees (2021)

Career highlights and awards
- 3× All-Star (2011, 2012, 2016); 2× Silver Slugger Award (2012, 2013)

Jay Allen Bruce (born April 3, 1987) is an American former professional baseball right fielder. He played in Major League Baseball (MLB) for the Cincinnati Reds, New York Mets, Cleveland Indians, Seattle Mariners, Philadelphia Phillies and New York Yankees. The Reds drafted Bruce in the first round with the 12th overall pick of the 2005 MLB draft, and he made his MLB debut in 2008. He was named an All-Star three times and won two Silver Slugger Awards.

== Early life ==
Bruce was born in Beaumont, Texas on April 3, 1987, the youngest of three children of Joe, a plumber, and Martha Bruce, a special education schoolteacher. His older sisters are Amy and Kellan, who is mentally disabled. As a child, Bruce played both baseball and football, but he stopped playing the latter when, due to the risk of injury, Martha refused to sign the necessary consent forms. His mom said: "[Football] was just so rough and kids got hurt. When it came time for him to move up to the next level, I wouldn't sign the consent form. I told him, 'all the work you put into baseball could be wiped out on one play.'"

Bruce attended West Brook High School in Beaumont, where he was a third-team All-American. In his senior year he batted .538 with 12 home runs, 31 RBIs, and 13 stolen bases. Bruce had accepted a scholarship to play college baseball at Tulane University but opted instead to turn professional out of high school. He was drafted 12th overall in the first round of the 2005 Major League Baseball draft, immediately behind fellow center fielder Andrew McCutchen, and signed for $1.8 million, the fifth-largest signing bonus the Reds had ever given at that time.

== Professional career ==
=== Minor leagues ===
Bruce's professional career began in 2005 in the Gulf Coast League, playing for the Reds' short-season rookie team. He hit .270/.331/.500 in 122 at bats in 37 games before moving on to the Reds' rookie affiliate Billings Mustangs. There he hit .257/.358/.457 with four home runs and 13 runs batted in (RBIs) in 70 at bats. Baseball America ranked him the top prospect in the Pioneer League, and the second-best prospect in the Gulf Coast League.

In 2006, he was promoted to the Reds' Low-A affiliate Dayton Dragons, where he excelled batting .291/.355/.516 (6th in the Midwest League) with 16 home runs (tied for 4th), 81 RBIs (4th; leading all Reds minor leaguers), and 42 doubles (leading the league), in 444 at bats, placing him on many top prospect lists. He was a Mid-Season All Star, an All Star Game Top Star, a Post-Season All Star, a Baseball America Low Class A All Star, and was named a Baseball America Minor League All Star. Baseball America named him the top prospect in the Midwest League.

For the 2007 season, Bruce was promoted to the Reds' high-A team, the Sarasota Reds of the Florida State League, then quickly promoted to the Reds' Double-A team, the Chattanooga Lookouts of the Southern League. He was a Mid-Season Florida State League All Star, and was selected to the 2007 All-Star Futures Game. Bruce was then promoted to the Reds' Triple-A club, the Louisville Bats of the International League. For the season for the three teams he batted .319/.375/.587 with 46 doubles (tied for 7th among all minor leaguers), 8 triples, 26 home runs (tops among all Reds minor leaguers), and 89 RBIs (3rd among all Reds minor leaguers) in 521 at bats. He was again named a Baseball America Minor League All Star, as well as a Baseball America High Class A All Star. He won the Baseball America Minor League Player of the Year Award, and The Sporting News Minor League Player of the Year Award. He was ranked as the top prospect in the Reds organization, Florida State League, and International League, and Baseball America rated him the best hitter for average and best power hitter in the Reds' minor league system.

Reds General Manager Wayne Krivsky informed Bruce and the media that Bruce would not get a look in the big leagues in 2007. However, during the Reds' final game of the 2007 season, Bruce was recognized for winning the Minor League Player of the Year award. Going into 2008 he was ranked the top minor league prospect in baseball by both Baseball America and Baseball Prospectus.

=== Cincinnati Reds ===
==== 2008 season ====
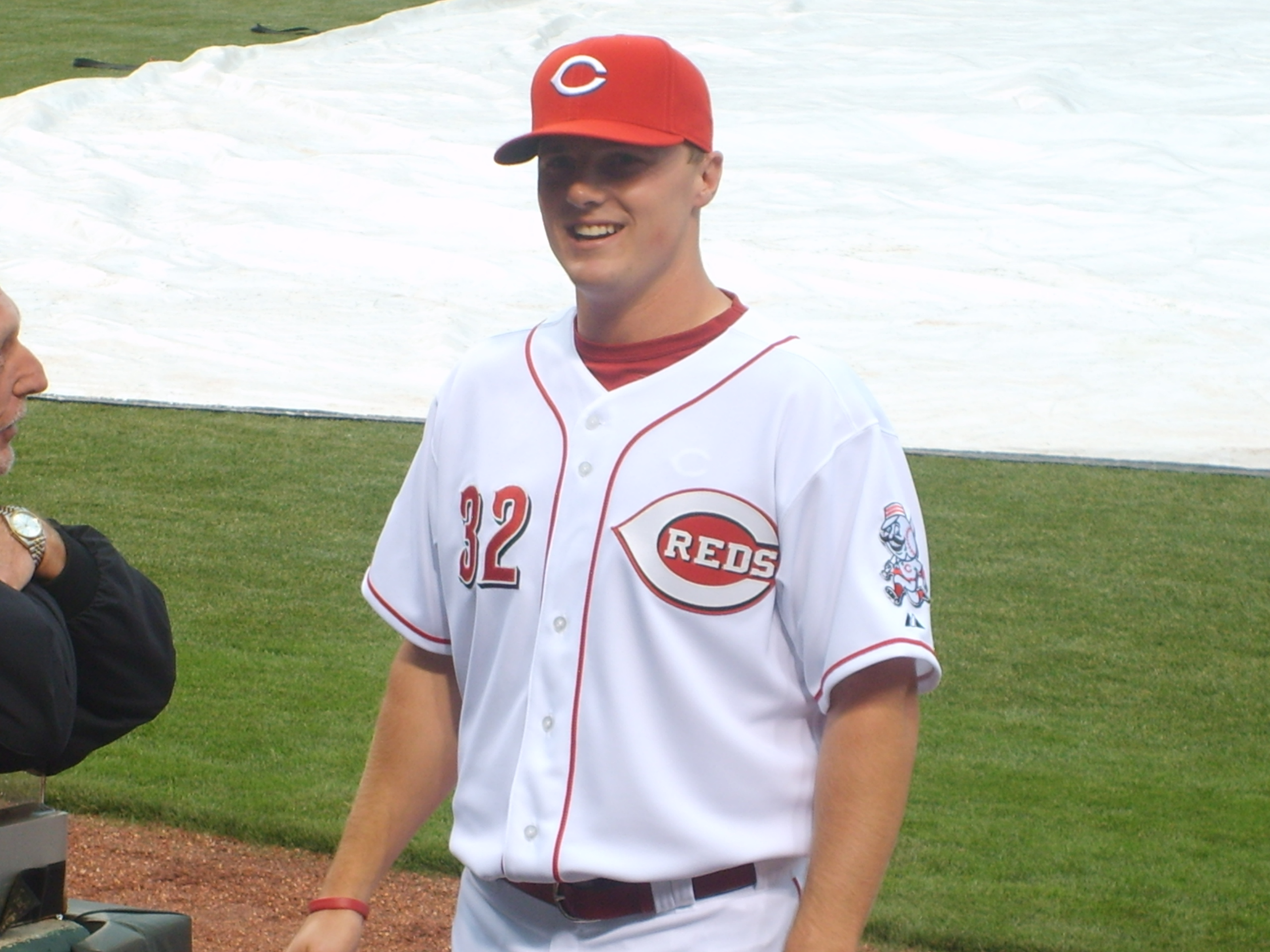
Bruce before his Major League debut with the Reds

Bruce was invited to the Reds' 2008 spring training. He hit .262 in his first spring training. On March 20, he was reassigned to the team's minor league camp and started the season at Louisville, where he batted .364 with 10 home runs and 13 stolen bases in 49 games before he was promoted. Entering the season he was rated by Baseball America as the top prospect in the Reds organization, and by both MLB.com and Baseball Prospectus as the top prospect in baseball, and by ESPN as the second-best prospect in baseball, as Baseball America rated him the best hitting prospect in the International League.

On May 27, 2008, Bruce got the call to join the Reds. He made his major league debut that day against right-handed pitcher Ian Snell of the Pittsburgh Pirates. Bruce started in center field, batting 3-for-3 with two singles and one double. He drove in two runs, scored twice, walked twice, and stole a base. In his second game, on May 28, also against Pittsburgh, he added a double, another stolen base, and two more walks. Bruce became the first Major League player since 1977 to reach base in his first six plate appearances.

On May 30, Bruce went 4-for-5 in a 3–2, 11-inning win over the Atlanta Braves. Bruce doubled in the tying run and scored the winning run in the 11th inning, after leading off the inning with a single. On May 31, Bruce launched his first Major League home run in the bottom of the 10th inning, to give the Reds a walk-off win. One day later, on June 1, he went 2-for-3 with a home run, a single, two RBIs, and a base on balls. Bruce had a 1.000 slugging percentage after his first six games; the only major league player since 1969 to achieve a higher slugging percentage for his first six games was Mike Jacobs in 2005.

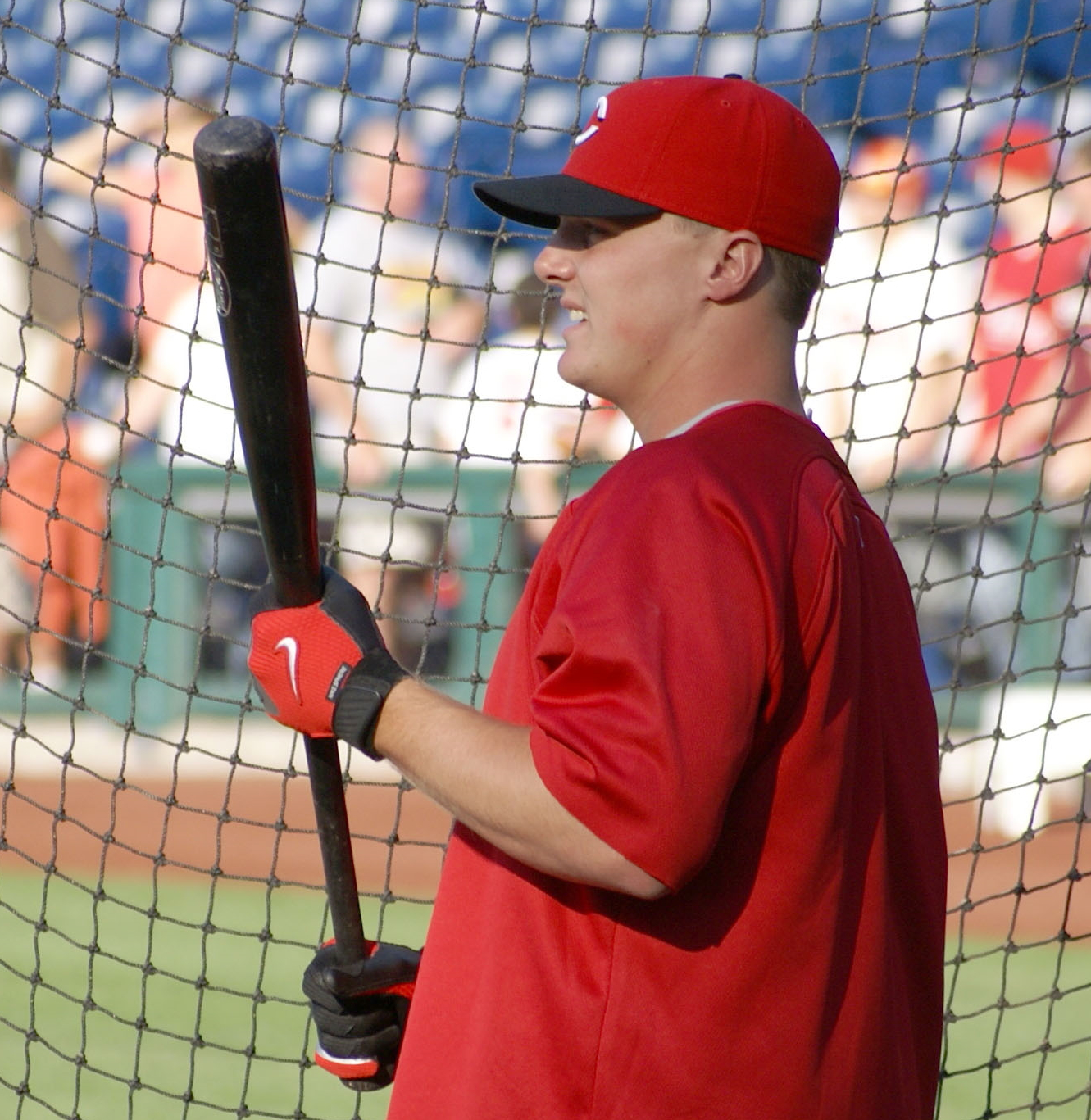
Bruce with the Reds

On June 2, Bruce hit the third home run of his career while going 2-for-4 in Philadelphia against the Phillies' Kyle Kendrick. In his first full week in the majors, he batted .577 (15-for-26) with three home runs, three doubles, and nine singles in addition to six bases on balls. He also scored 12 runs and batted in seven more runs. The Reds had a winning percentage of .714 (5–2) during his first week. Before Bruce was called up to the majors, they had a winning percentage of .451 (23–28), and had lost five of seven games. Bruce had a 12-game hitting streak during July.

To open August, after nearly half of a month without a home run, Bruce hit home runs in back-to-back games against the Washington Nationals. Two games later, Bruce hit his 10th home run of the season and his third of the month against the Milwaukee Brewers. In the final game of the Brewers' series, Bruce hit his 11th home run of the season. Following the trades of veteran outfielders Ken Griffey Jr. and Adam Dunn, Bruce hit his 12th home run of the season in a loss to the Pittsburgh Pirates.

For the season, he batted .254/.314/.453 with 21 home runs and 52 RBIs in 413 at bats. On defense, in 2008 he tied for the lead among all major league outfielders in errors, with 11. He was the 6th-youngest player in the NL. He was named to the Baseball America Major League All-Rookie Team and the TOPPS Major League Rookie All-Star Team. He came in fourth among rookies in voting for the National League's Jackie Robinson Award.

==== 2009 season ====
On April 6, Bruce started his first-ever Opening Day game. After missing time due to injury, Bruce bounced back with back-to-back homers on April 21 and 22 against the Chicago Cubs. On July 11, Bruce fractured his right wrist while making a diving play in right field in a game against the New York Mets. On September 14, Bruce made his return against the Houston Astros, pinch hitting with the bases loaded in the seventh inning. Bruce's two-run single gave the Reds a 2–1 lead that would hold up as the game-winning hit.

Bruce batted .223/.303/.470 for the season with 22 home runs and 58 RBIs in 345 at bats. He was tied for 5th among NL outfielders, with 11 assists.

==== 2010 season ====
On June 30, Bruce hit the game-winning home run off Phillies' ace Roy Halladay. On August 27, Bruce hit three home runs against the Chicago Cubs – two off Tom Gorzelanny and another off Scott Maine in Maine's MLB debut. On September 28, Bruce hit a bottom-of-the-ninth inning, first-pitch, walk-off home run off Astros pitcher Tim Byrdak to clinch the NL Central title for the Reds. It was the team's first trip to the postseason since 1995. The home run was the Capital One Premier Play of the Year. On October 3 he won the NL Player of the Week Award. For the season, he batted .281 (a career high)/.353/.493 with 25 home runs and 70 RBIs in 509 at bats. He led NL right fielders in range factor/game, at 2.40.

Bruce was the only baserunner allowed during Halladay's no-hitter in game 1 of the 2010 NLDS. On December 9, 2010, the Reds agreed to extend Bruce to a six-year $51 million deal, that included a $12 million option for a seventh year.

==== 2011 season ====
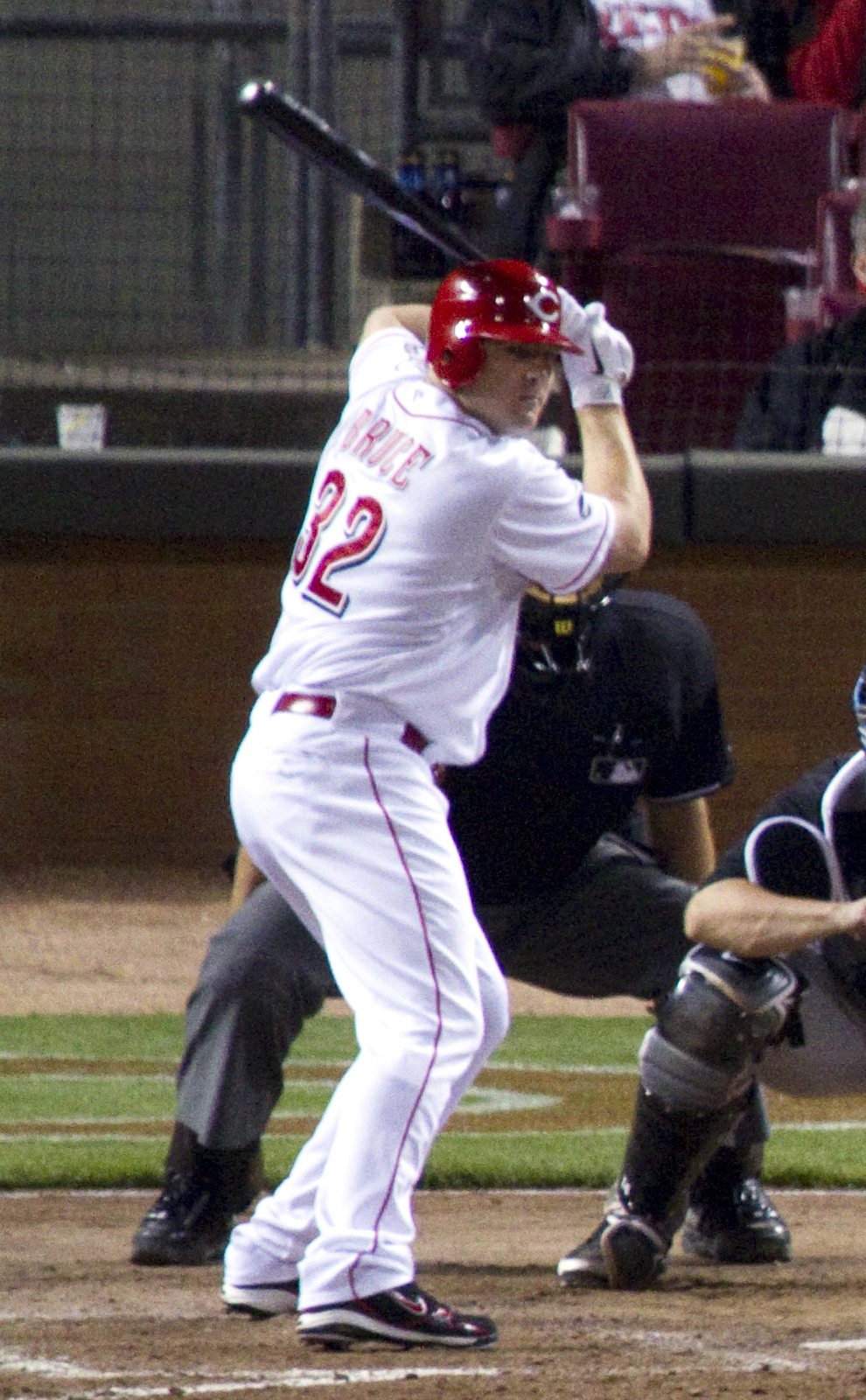
Bruce batting in 2011

After finishing March/April hitting .237 with four home runs, 11 RBIs, and striking out 27 times, Bruce came back strong in May, batting .392 with 12 home runs and 33 RBIs and earning NL Player of the Month for May. On May 29 he won the NL Player of the Week Award. He was selected to play in the 2011 Major League Baseball All-Star Game. On August 14 he won the NL Player of the Week Award.

At age 24 years, five months, and 191 days, Bruce hit his 100th career home run on September 27, becoming the third-youngest Reds' player to reach 100 home runs behind Johnny Bench and Frank Robinson, who both accomplished that feat at age 23. For the season, he batted .256/.341/.474 and was 8th in the NL in home runs, with 32, and in RBIs, with 97, in 585 at bats. He had 10 outfield assists (tied for 6th in the NL), and was nominated for a Rawlings Gold Glove Award for the first time in his career.

==== 2012 season ====
Bruce was named the NL Player of the Week for April 23–29. In that span, he hit .476 while leading the MLB with a 1.143 slugging percentage and 24 total bases while tying for the lead with four home runs. Bruce hit a go-ahead home run on April 29, giving the Reds a 6–5 win over the Houston Astros. On June 15, Bruce hit an inside-the-park home run to ignite the Reds to a 7–3 win over the Mets.

He was named to his second Major League Baseball All-Star Game on July 1. On September 9 Bruce won the NL Player of the Week Award for the fifth time in his career.

Bruce ended the 2012 season batting .252/.327/.514 and was 3rd in the National League in home runs with 34, behind Ryan Braun and Giancarlo Stanton, 4th in extra base hits (74) and at bats per home run (16.5), 8th in sacrifice flies (7), 9th in RBIs (99), and 10th in slugging percentage (.514). He won the Silver Slugger Award, and came in 10th in voting for NL Most Valuable Player. His throwing arm was rated third-best in the league by NL managers.

==== 2013 season ====
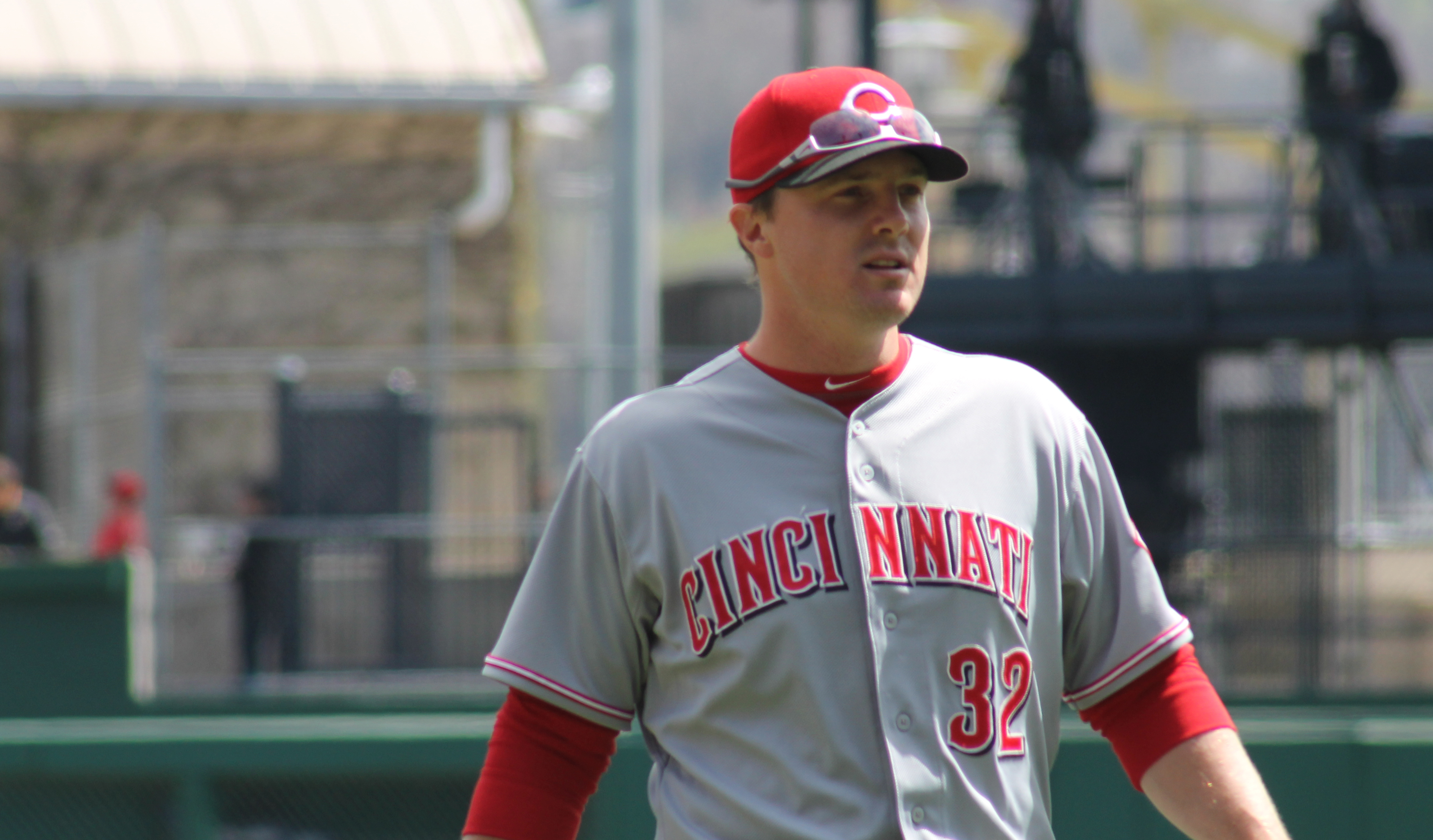
Bruce before a game in April 2014

On September 17, Bruce hit his second career grand slam, this one against the Houston Astros. The home run, his 30th, meant he reached that mark for the third season in his career, and his five RBIs gave him 100 for the first time.

He finished the season batting .262/.329/.478 and was 2nd in the NL with 109 RBIs, his highest year-end total to date, and 74 extra base hits, 3rd in doubles (43; a career high) and home runs (30), and 10th in runs scored (89) and at bats per home run (20.9). His 13 outfield assists tied for 3rd in the NL. In the post-season, Bruce was a finalist nominee for the Gold Glove Award, but did not win. Bruce did win his second consecutive Louisville Slugger Silver Slugger Award and the 2nd Annual Wilson Defensive Player of the Year Award (awarded to one player on each team). For the second year in the row, Bruce finished tenth in NL MVP voting.

==== 2014 season ====
On May 5, 2014, Bruce underwent left knee arthroscopic surgery to repair a torn meniscus. He was placed on the 15-day disabled list on the same day he had the surgery. On July 7, with Joey Votto out due to injury, Bruce made his professional debut at first base. He batted .217/.281/.373 with 18 home runs, 66 RBIs, and a career-high 12 stolen bases in 496 at bats for the season.

==== 2015 season ====
The Reds almost traded Bruce to the Toronto Blue Jays before the season, but the trade fell through at the time, due to injury issues with the involved players. Bruce hit his 200th career home run on August 10, 2015, becoming the ninth Reds player and 319th Major Leaguer to do so.

For the season, he batted .226/.294/.434 with 26 home runs and 87 RBIs, and was 3rd in the NL in sacrifice flies (9) and 8th in the NL in extra base hits (65). He led NL right fielders in range factor/game, at 2.09, and ranked 3rd among NL outfielders in assists, with 11.

==== 2016 season ====
On July 9, 2016, Bruce was named to his third All-Star team as a replacement for the injured Dexter Fowler. With Cincinnati, before he was traded, he batted .265/.316/.559 with 25 home runs and league-leading 80 RBIs in 370 at bats. He became the first player traded during the season while leading the league in RBIs since the stat became official in 1920.

=== New York Mets ===
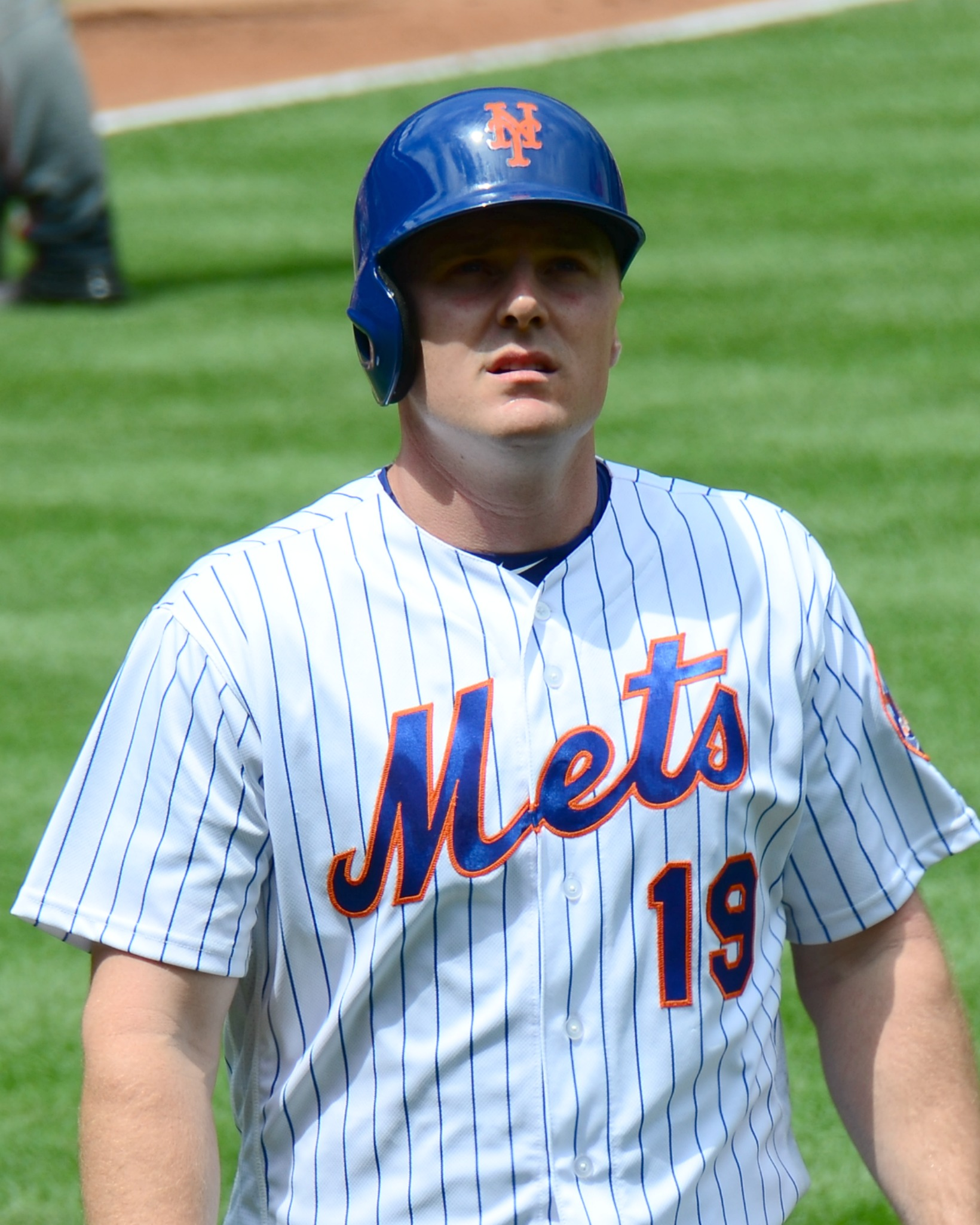
Bruce with the Mets in 2016

On August 1, 2016, the Reds traded Bruce to the New York Mets for Dilson Herrera and Max Wotell. For the remainder of that season, he batted a disappointing .219/.294/.391 and hit 8 home runs with 19 RBIs in 169 at bats. Between the two teams he batted .250/.309/.506 in 539 at bats. For the season he was 6th in the NL in home runs (with 33), 8th in at bats per home run (16.3), and 9th in RBIs (with 99). He had 10 outfield assists, 5th-most in the NL.

In the 2017 season, Bruce batted .256/.321/.520 along with hitting a team-high 29 home runs with 75 RBIs in 406 at bats, prior to his trade.

=== Cleveland Indians ===
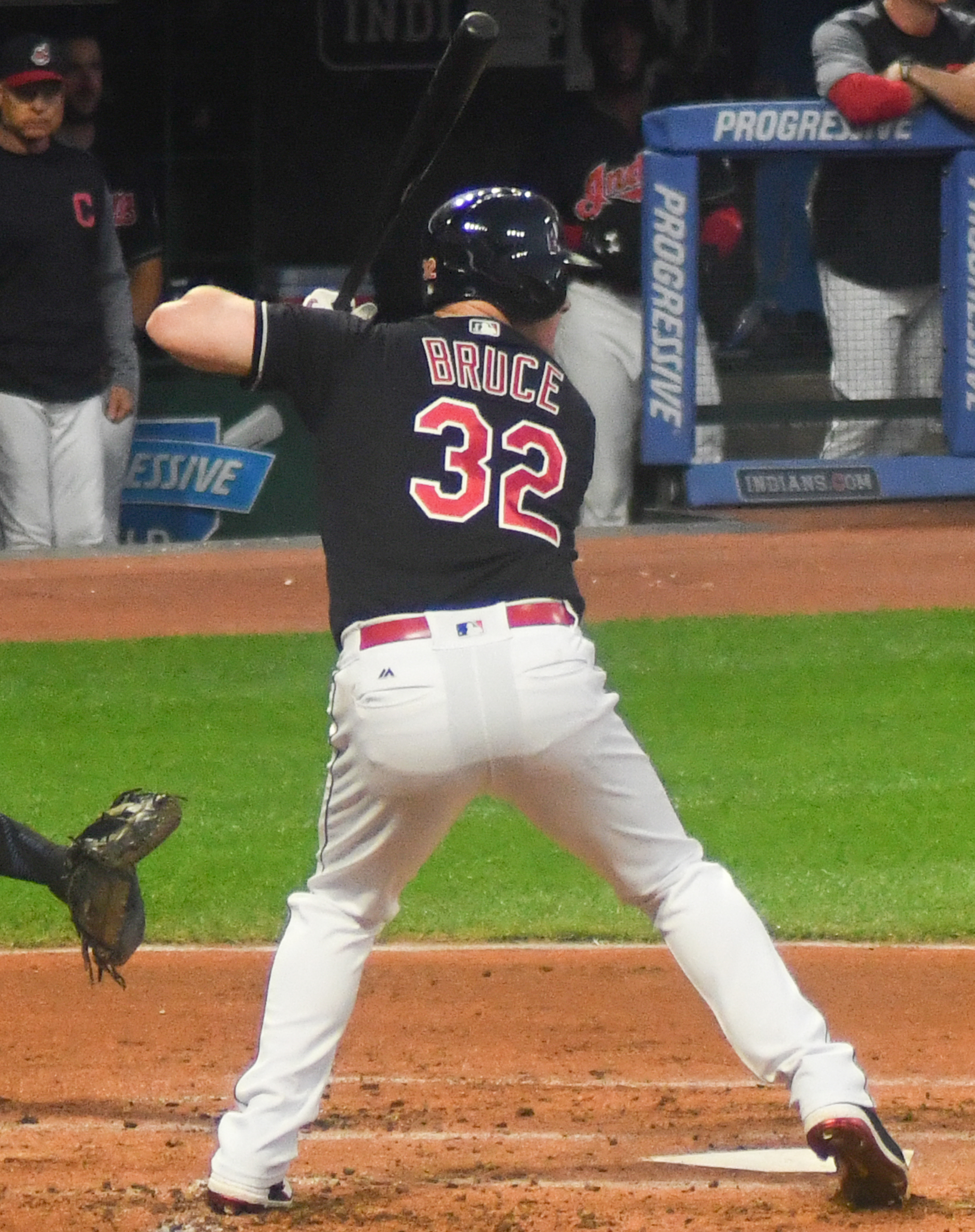
Bruce batting for the Indians in 2017

After the Mets failed to trade Bruce before the trade deadline, on August 9, 2017, the Cleveland Indians picked him up off waivers and he was exchanged for minor league pitcher Ryder Ryan. On September 14 he hit the walk-off double to extend the Indians' win streak to 22 games. In 2017 with the Indians he batted .248/.331/.477 with 7 home runs and 26 RBIs in 149 at bats. In total for the 2017 season he batted .254/.324/.508 with a career-high 36 home runs and 101 RBIs.

=== Return to the Mets ===
On January 16, 2018, Bruce signed a three-year, $39 million contract with the Mets. For the first half of the season, he struggled offensively, hitting .212 with three home runs and 17 RBIs before being placed on the disabled list on June 19 with a right hip injury that had bothered him since mid-March.

In 2018, Bruce hit .223/.310/.370 with 9 home runs and 37 RBIs in 319 at bats. He had the slowest baserunning sprint speed of all major league right fielders, at 25.5 feet/second.

=== Seattle Mariners ===
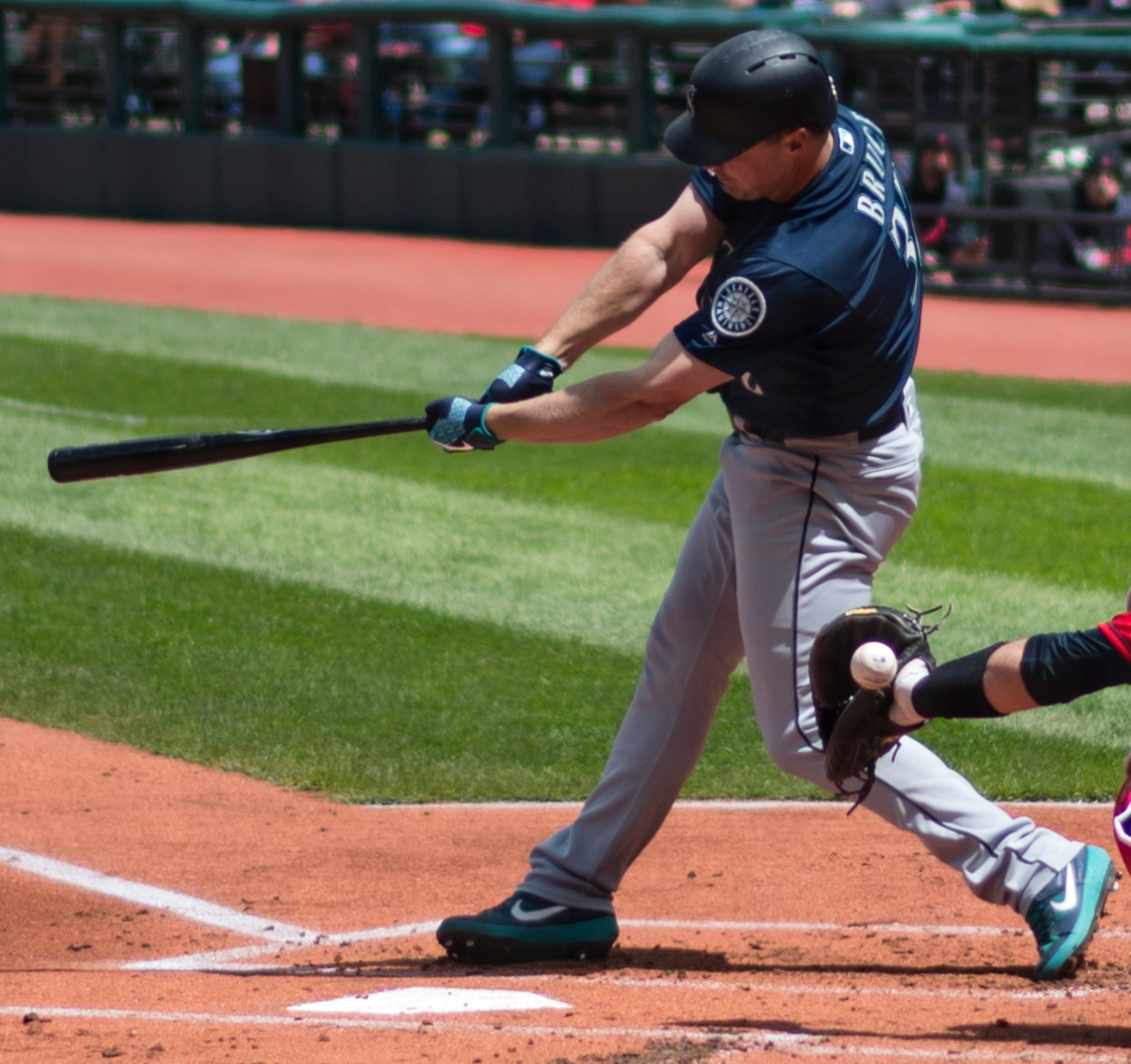
Bruce batting for the Mariners in 2019

On December 3, 2018, the Mets traded Bruce, Jarred Kelenic, Anthony Swarzak, Gerson Bautista, and Justin Dunn to the Seattle Mariners for Edwin Díaz, Robinson Canó, and $20 million.

On May 31, 2019, Bruce hit his 300th career home run off of Tyler Skaggs as the Mariners won 4–3 over the Angels. During the 2019 season with Seattle, before he was traded, he batted .212/.283/.533 with 14 home runs and 28 RBIs in 165 at bats. In his major league career through that point, he had played 1,431 games in right field, 52 games at first base, 36 games in center field (all but one of them in his first season), and 17 games in left field.

=== Philadelphia Phillies ===
On June 2, 2019, the Mariners traded Bruce and about $18.5 million to the Philadelphia Phillies for minor league third baseman Jake Scheiner. There was $21.3 million remaining on his contract, and the Mariners were obligated to pay Bruce $2.75 million of that over the following 1 1/2 seasons. Bruce said: "I get to go somewhere I have a chance to win, and at this point in my career that's pretty paramount for me."

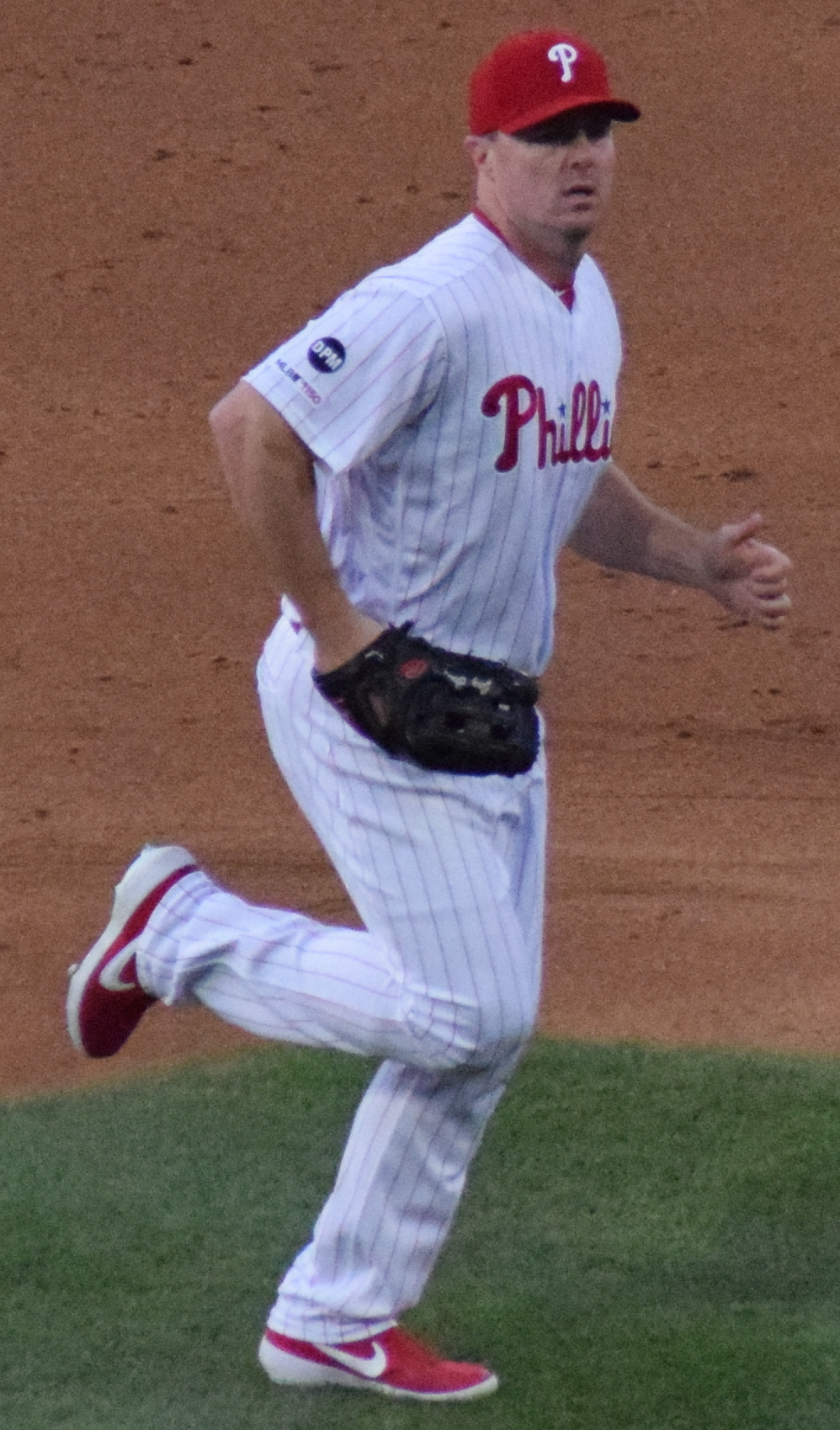
Bruce playing for the Phillies in 2019

Bruce hit two home runs (including a grand slam) and a double in his first start for the Phillies. He became the fourth player to hit two home runs in his first start for the Phillies (joining Lefty O’Doul (1929), Jeremy Giambi (2002), and Daniel Nava (2017)), the first to hit two home runs including a grand slam, the first Phillies player with 10 or more total bases in his first start for the team, and the fifth player since 1920 with at least two home runs and six RBIs in his first start for an MLB team (joining Roman Mejias (1962), Brant Alyea (1970), Sam Horn (1990), and Calvin Pickering (2004)). Bruce became the first Phillies player since the onset of the modern era (1920) to hit four home runs in his first four games with his new team. On June 10, he won his sixth career Player of the Week Award.

In 2019, he batted .221/.235/.510 for the Phillies, with 12 home runs and 31 RBIs in 145 at bats as he spent more than one spell on the injured list. His 312 career home runs at the end of the season were 8th-most among active ballplayers, and his 1,535 strikeouts were 9th-most.

In 2020, Bruce hit .198/.252/.469 with 6 home runs and 14 RBIs in 32 games during the pandemic-shortened season.

=== New York Yankees ===
On February 13, 2021, Bruce signed a minor-league deal with the New York Yankees, with a $1.35 million contract option if he was named to the team. When regular first baseman Luke Voit was diagnosed with a partial meniscus tear that would keep him out of the lineup for the first few weeks of the season, the Yankees selected Bruce's contract on March 27.

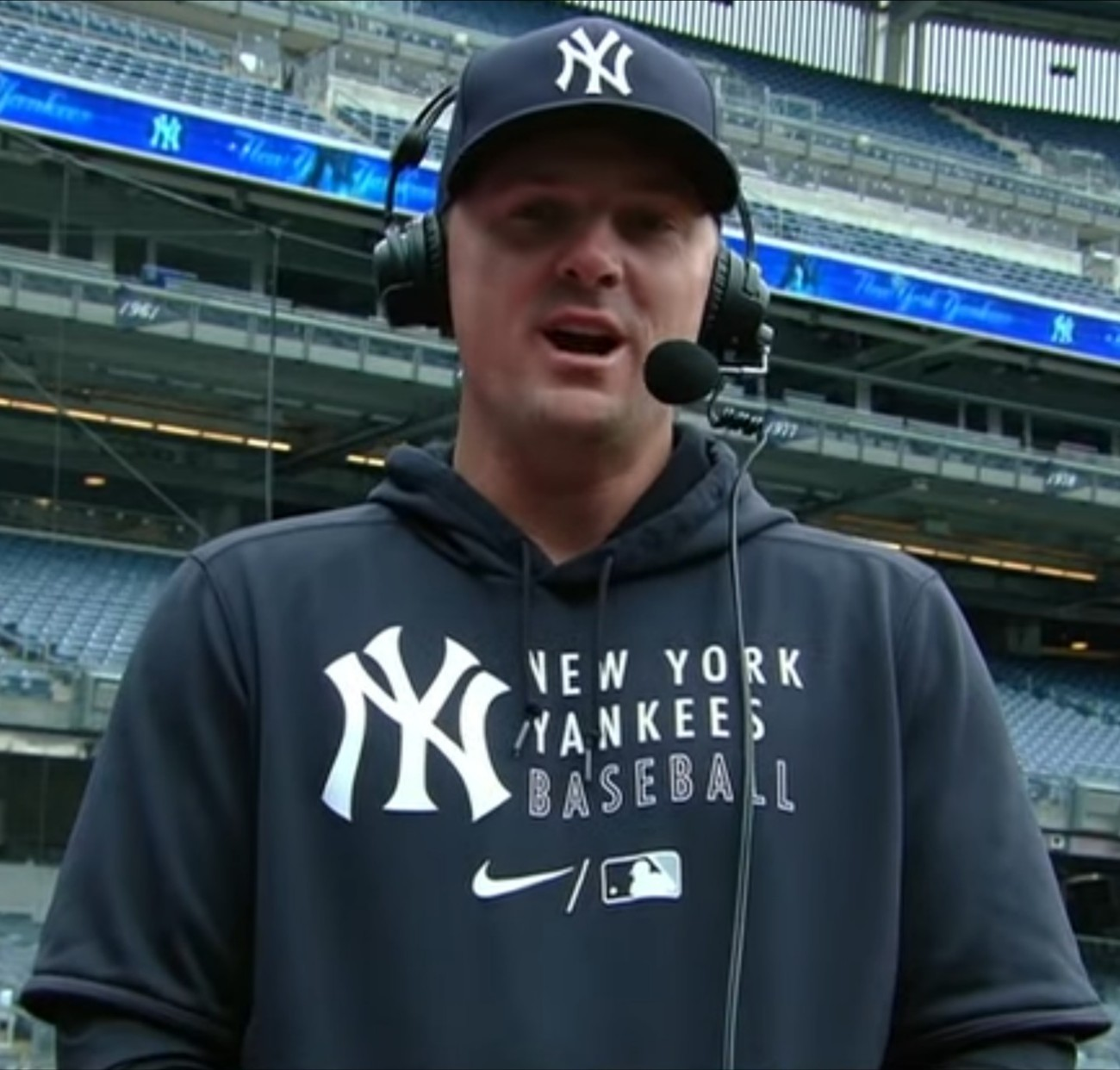
Bruce with the Yankees in 2021

Bruce's first game in a Yankees uniform was on April 3, his 34th birthday; he recorded one hit and two RBIs off of Tim Mayza of the Toronto Blue Jays in the sixth inning of the Yankees' 5–3 victory, their first win of the season. Bruce struggled in the following two weeks, however, batting only .118 in 10 games and striking out 13 times in 39 plate appearances. As Bruce's struggles became more apparent, the Yankees shifted DJ LeMahieu from second base to first, with new addition Rougned Odor filling in at second.

=== Retirement ===
Bruce announced his retirement from baseball on April 18, 2021, telling reporters, "Ultimately, I just felt like I couldn't perform at the level that I expected out of myself." During his retirement conference, he added that he knew, following the 2020 season, that "the days [were] numbered" with regards to his tenure in MLB. Across 14 major league seasons, Bruce had a career .244 average, .314 OBP, and .467 slugging percentage. He also recorded 319 home runs and 951 RBIs in 1,650 career games.

== Personal life ==
Bruce is of Scottish ancestry. On December 1, 2012, in Dripping Springs, Texas, Bruce married Hannah Eastham, whom he had been dating since early in high school. The couple have two children.

== Awards ==
- 2016 – NL All-Star
- 2013 – Wilson Defensive Player of the Year Award (for Cincinnati Reds)
- 2013 – Louisville Slugger Silver Slugger Award
- 2012 – Louisville Slugger Silver Slugger Award
- 2012 – NL All-Star
- 2011 – NL All-Star
- 2007 – Baseball America Minor League Player of the Year Award
- 2007 – Baseball America Minor League All-Star
- 2007 – Florida State League Mid-Season All-Star
- 2006 – Baseball America Minor League All-Star
- 2006 – Midwest League (MID) Post-Season All-Star
- 2006 – MID Mid-Season All-Star
- 2006 – MID All-Star Game Top Star
