= Topps Minor League Player of the Year Award =

Professional baseball sports award

- Sport: Baseball
- League: Minor League Baseball
- Awarded for: Player of the Year
- Country: United States, Canada, Mexico
- Presented by: The Topps Company; Minor League Baseball

History
- First award: 1960
- First winner: Al Cicotte
- Most wins: Roger Freed (1970, 1976); Sandy Alomar Jr. (1988, 1989)
- Most recent: Byron Buxton (2013)

The Topps Minor League Player of the Year Award was presented by The Topps Company in conjunction with Minor League Baseball to a minor-league player deemed to have had the most outstanding season. It was awarded annually beginning in 1960, but has not been issued since 2013. A newspaper report of the 1972 result, the first tie in the award's history, noted that winners were selected via a poll of minor league baseball writers.

It has also been known, circa 1970 onward, as the J. G. Taylor Spink Award, (Note: This award should not be confused with the BBWAA Career Excellence Award presented annually by the Baseball Writers' Association of America, which was known for over 50 years as the J. G. Taylor Spink Award.) although use of that naming has been inconsistent over time. Namesake J. G. Taylor Spink was publisher of The Sporting News from 1914 until his death in 1962.

== Recipients ==
This section lists players who have won the award, from its inception in 1960 through 2013 when it was last known to have been awarded. Blank entries indicate a winner is unknown, or the award may not have been issued.

1960–1979

- 1960: Al Cicotte
- 1961: Howie Koplitz
- 1962: Jesse Gonder
- 1963: Billy Cowan
- 1964: Luis Tiant
- 1965: Dave Roberts
- 1966: Mike Epstein
- 1967: Félix Millán
- 1968: Tony Solaita
- 1969: Danny Walton
- 1970: Roger Freed
- 1971: Bobby Grich
- 1972: Tom Paciorek & Mike Reinbach
- 1973: Tom Robson
- 1974: Jim Rice
- 1975: Héctor Cruz
- 1976: Roger Freed
- 1977: Ken Landreaux
- 1978: Champ Summers
- 1979: Dave Stockstill

1980–1999

- 1980: Randy Bass
- 1981: Mike Marshall
- 1982: Ron Kittle
- 1983: Kevin McReynolds
- 1984: Alan Knicely
- 1985:
- 1986:
- 1987:
- 1988: Sandy Alomar Jr.
- 1989: Sandy Alomar Jr.
- 1990:
- 1991:
- 1992: Tim Salmon
- 1993: Cliff Floyd
- 1994: Derek Jeter
- 1995: Johnny Damon
- 1996: Andruw Jones
- 1997: Paul Konerko
- 1998: Eric Chavez
- 1999: Adam Piatt

2000–2013

- 2000: Jason Hart
- 2001: Josh Beckett
- 2002: Jason Stokes
- 2003: Jeremy Reed
- 2004: Dallas McPherson
- 2005: Delmon Young
- 2006: Alex Gordon
- 2007: Steve Pearce
- 2008: Mat Gamel
- 2009: Buster Posey
- 2010: Mike Trout
- 2011: Matt Moore
- 2012: Wil Myers
- 2013: Byron Buxton

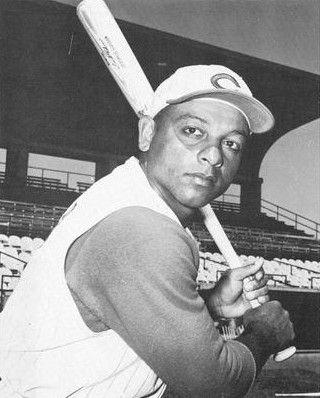
1962 recipient Jesse Gonder

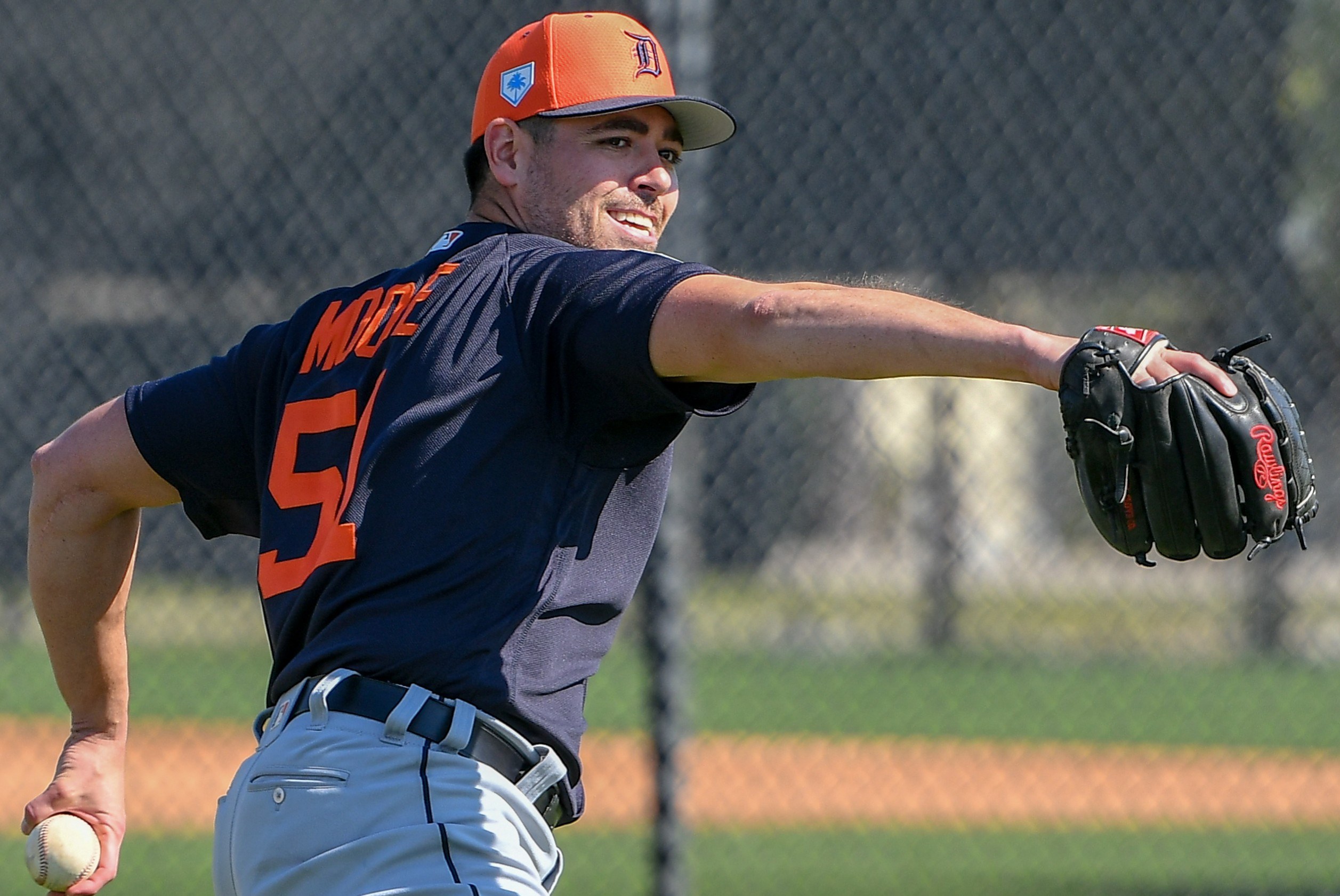
2011 recipient Matt Moore

== See also ==
- Baseball America Minor League Player of the Year Award
- The Sporting News Minor League Player of the Year Award
- USA Today Minor League Player of the Year Award
