= Kristian Campbell =

American baseball player (born 2002)

Boston Red Sox – No. 28
- Second baseman / Outfielder
- Born: June 28, 2002 (age 24); Chattanooga, Tennessee, U.S.
- Bats: Right Throws: Right

MLB debut
- March 27, 2025, for the Boston Red Sox

MLB statistics (through 2025 season)
- Batting average: .223
- Home runs: 6
- Runs batted in: 21
- Stats at Baseball Reference

Teams
- Boston Red Sox (2025)

Kristian Eron Campbell (born June 28, 2002) is an American professional baseball second baseman and outfielder in the Boston Red Sox organization. He made his Major League Baseball (MLB) debut in 2025.

== Amateur career ==
Campbell attended George Walton Comprehensive High School in Marietta, Georgia. He lettered in baseball all four years of high school. In 2019, his team won the Region 5 Division 7A Championship. In 2020, he batted .373 with a .572 on base percentage and 30 stolen bases. After finishing high school in 2021, he was ranked as the 125th best prospect by Perfect Game but was not selected in the 2021 Major League Baseball draft. He played college baseball at Georgia Tech. He redshirted his first season, then played summer league baseball for the Duluth Huskies of the Northwoods League. In 2023, he slashed .376/.484/.549 in 45 games, walking 29 times and getting hit by a pitch 11 times while striking out only 17 times. He was named a freshman All-American by Collegiate Baseball.

== Professional career ==
Campbell was selected by the Boston Red Sox in the fourth round of the 2023 Major League Baseball draft. Campbell debuted as a professional in early August 2023 with the rookie-level Florida Complex League Red Sox. He was promoted to the High-A Greenville Drive later in August. In 26 games, he hit .309 with seven extra base hits, 10 walks, and 17 strikeouts.

He started 2024 with Greenville before being promoted to the Portland Sea Dogs. He finished the season with the Worcester Red Sox in Triple-A, posting a combined .330/.439/.558 slash line across the three teams. He was named Minor League Player of the Year by Baseball America and USA Today.

Before the 2025 season, Campbell was named a top 10 prospect by MLB.com, Baseball America, Baseball Prospectus, FanGraphs, and the Athletic.

On March 27, 2025, the Red Sox selected Campbell's contract after he made the team's Opening Day roster. On April 2, Campbell and the Red Sox agreed to an eight-year contract extension worth $60 million. The deal also includes club options for 2033 and 2034. Campbell reached base in his first 17 games, the second largest streak to start a career in Red Sox history. By the end of April, Campbell was slashing .301/.407/.495 for an OPS of .902 with 4 HR and 12 RBI. Campbell was rewarded with the AL Rookie of the Month Award for April. However, after his successful April, Campbell struggled. He slashed .154/.249/.222, and struggled defensively in May and June. On June 19, with his slumping performance and return of Wilyer Abreu, the Red Sox announced that they were optioning Campbell to Triple-A.

Campbell was optioned to Triple-A Worcester to begin the 2026 season.

== Personal life ==
Kristian Campbell is the eldest of three children born to Kenneth, a high school teacher, and Tonya, an accountant. Kenneth played college football for the Tennessee Volunteers, where he had 41 rushing attempts and one touchdown as a running back.

Awards and achievements
Preceded by Wyatt Langford	American League Rookie of the Month; April 2025	Succeeded by Jacob Wilson
