= Howie Koplitz =

American baseball player (1938–2012)

- Pitcher
- Born: May 4, 1938; Oshkosh, Wisconsin, U.S.
- Died: January 2, 2012 (aged 73); Oshkosh, Wisconsin, U.S.
- Batted: Right Threw: Right

MLB debut
- September 8, 1961, for the Detroit Tigers

Last MLB appearance
- April 24, 1966, for the Washington Senators

MLB statistics
- Win–loss record: 9–7
- Earned run average: 4.21
- Strikeouts: 87
- Stats at Baseball Reference

Teams
- Detroit Tigers (1961–1962); Washington Senators (1964–1966)

Howard Dean Koplitz (May 4, 1938 – January 2, 2012) was an American professional baseball pitcher who appeared in 54 games, 19 as a starter, over parts of five seasons in Major League Baseball (MLB) (1961–1962; 1964–1966) for the Detroit Tigers and Washington Senators. The native of Oshkosh, Wisconsin, threw and batted right-handed, stood 5 feet 10 inches (1.78 m) tall and weighed 190 pounds (86 kg).

== Early life ==
Koplitz was born on May 4, 1938, in Oshkosh Wisconsin, the son of Eldor and Esther (Diestler) Koplitz. He attended Oshkosh High School. He played high school baseball and American Legion baseball as a pitcher and outfielder. He was also an All-Fox River Valley Conference selectee on both offense and defense as a football player.

== Professional baseball ==
Koplitz signed with the Tigers as an amateur free agent out of Oshkosh High School in 1956, by Tigers scout George Moriarity. Six years earlier, Moriarity had signed Oshkosh pitching star Billy Hoeft.

=== Early minor league career ===
In 1956, the 18-year old Koplitz was assigned to the Class-D Jamestown Falcons, where he had a 1–7 won–loss record, and 5.82 earned run average (ERA). He improved in 1957, playing for the Class-C Idaho Falls Russets, with a 14–4 record and 3.34 ERA while completing 16 of 25 games started with two shutouts.

From 1958-60, he played Class-B, Single-A and Triple-A baseball for five different teams. He pitched the winning game for the Knoxville Smokies in winning the 1959 Single-A South Atlantic League (Sally League) championship, with a complete game three-hitter. Koplitz had some difficulty early in the season, but finished 9–6 with a 3.66 ERA, and Smokies manager Johnny Pesky trusted in Koplitz to start the most important game of the season.

In 1961, his sixth season chiefly in the Detroit farm system, he played for the Birmingham Barons. Koplitz posted a 23–3 (.885) won–lost record, with a 2.11 ERA, and was selected the Most Valuable Player of the Double A Southern Association. His peak season also included a no-hitter, with fellow Oshkosh native, and future major league umpire, Dutch Rennert serving as one of the field umpires. He was also named The Sporting News Minor League Player of the Year.

=== Detroit Tigers and Washington Senators ===
The performance for Birmingham earned Koplitz his first taste of the majors when rosters were expanded to 40 men after September 1, 1961. In his first game in the big leagues, at Fenway Park on September 8, the first batter he faced was future Baseball Hall of Famer Carl Yastrzemski, whom he struck out. In 1961 for the Tigers, he appeared in four games with a 2–0 record and 2.25 ERA. He played one more season in Detroit (1962), starting six games, with a 3–0 record and 5.26 ERA. He also pitched one game for the Triple-A Denver Bears in 1962.

In December 1963, the Senators selected Koplitz in the Rule 5 draft. In 1964, he pitched 17 innings in six games for the Senators. The next year with the Senators constituted his longest time spent in one major league season. Koplitz had 11 starts in 33 pitching appearances for the Senators, pitching over 100 innings for the first and only time in his major league career. He record was 4–7, with a 4.05 ERA.

In 1966, his final major league season, Koplitz appeared in only one game for the Senators, pitching two innings. He injured his shoulder in spring training that year and never recovered, his major league career ending at the age of 28.

Koplitz went 9–7, with two complete games, one save and a 4.21 earned run average during his MLB career. He allowed 187 hits and 80 bases on balls in 1751/3 innings pitched, with 87 strikeouts. He handled 47 total chances (12 putouts, 35 assists) perfectly without an error for a perfect 1.000 fielding percentage in his major league career.

=== Later minor league career ===
Koplitz spent the 1963 season with the Triple-A Syracuse Chiefs, going 7–8 with a 3.90 ERA, before being left exposed in the Rule 5 draft later that year. In 1964, he played Triple-A baseball with the Toronto Maple Leafs and Tacoma Giants, with a combined 2.92 ERA, but a 2–12 won-loss record. In 1965, even with his longest stint in the major leagues, Koplitz still started eight games for the Hawaii Islanders of the Pacific Coast League. In his final minor league season (1966), at age 28, Koplitz pitched in three games for the Double-A York White Roses.

== Personal life ==
After retiring, he worked 38 years as a United States Postal Service clerk in Oshkosh. He also coached the baseball team at Lourdes High School, and was a director of American Legion baseball, in Oshkosh.

== Death ==
Koplitz died on January 2, 2012, in Oshkosh. He was survived by his wife of 49 years Karen (Kimball) Koplitz, five children and numerous grandchildren.
