= Cliff Floyd =

American baseball player (born 1972)

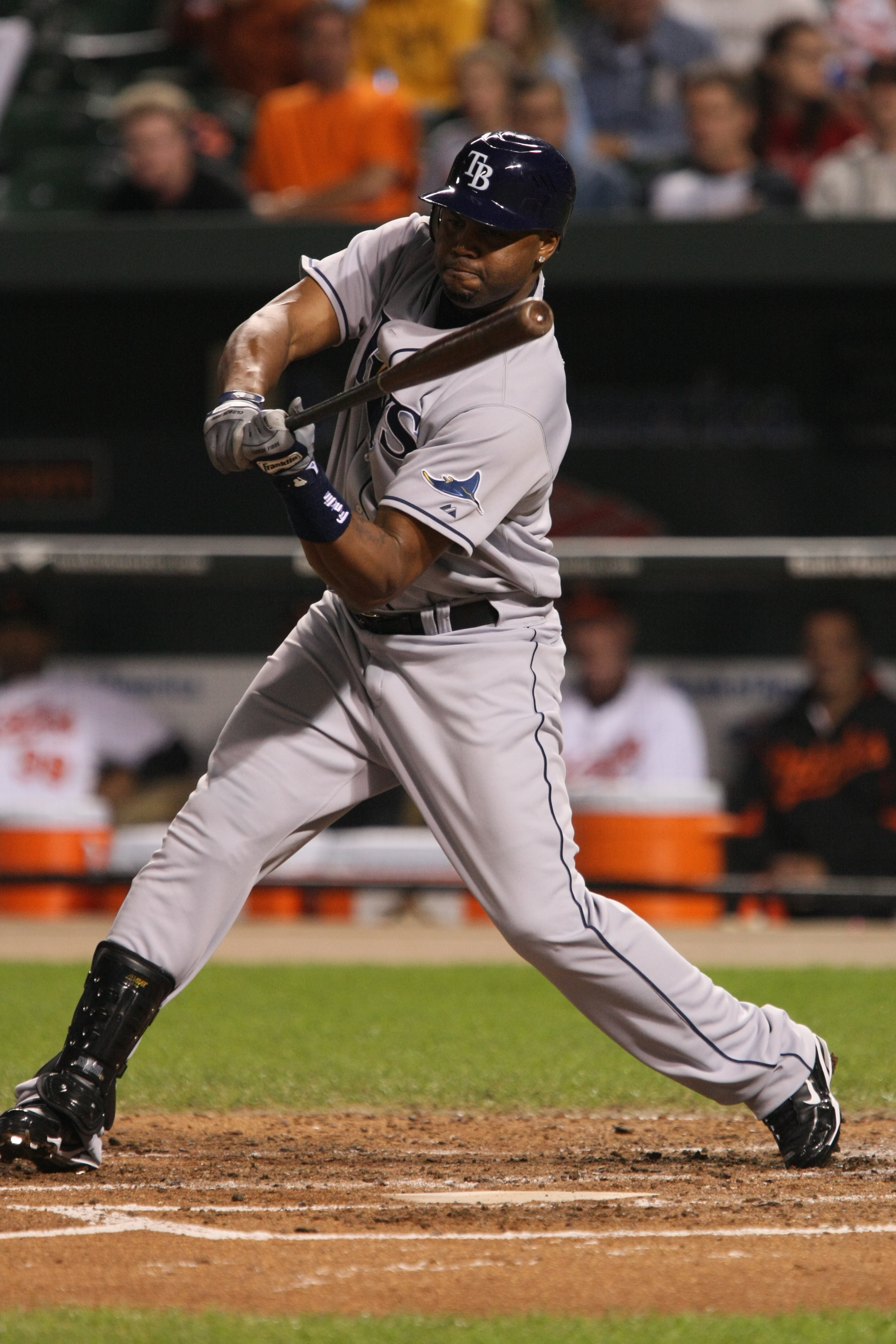
- Floyd batting for the Tampa Bay Rays in 2008
- Left fielder
- Born: December 5, 1972 (age 53); Chicago, Illinois, U.S.
- Batted: Left Threw: Right

MLB debut
- September 18, 1993, for the Montreal Expos

Last MLB appearance
- June 17, 2009, for the San Diego Padres

MLB statistics
- Batting average: .278
- Home runs: 233
- Runs batted in: 865
- Stats at Baseball Reference

Teams
- Montreal Expos (1993–1996); Florida Marlins (1997–2002); Montreal Expos (2002); Boston Red Sox (2002); New York Mets (2003–2006); Chicago Cubs (2007); Tampa Bay Rays (2008); San Diego Padres (2009)

Career highlights and awards
- All-Star (2001); World Series champion (1997)

Cornelius Clifford Floyd Jr. (born December 5, 1972) is an American former Major League Baseball left fielder who played for 17 seasons, most notably for the Montreal Expos, Florida Marlins and New York Mets. He is currently a baseball analyst who co-hosts on Sirius XM Radio and appears for both MLB Network and the Chicago Cubs on Marquee Sports Network.

== Early years ==
Floyd was born to parents Cornelius Clifford Floyd Sr. and Olivia Floyd. After spending 13 years as an only child, Floyd was joined by brother Julius. Sister Shanta was later adopted when the Floyds noticed her as a six-year-old classmate of Julius' who had been troublesome for her then adoptive parents. The three siblings were raised in Markham, Illinois, a small suburb southwest of Chicago. Floyd's father, a former member of the United States Marine Corps, worked double shifts at a U.S. Steel plant in Chicago to allow the family to live in a safe and stable neighborhood.

At Thornwood High School in South Holland, Illinois, Floyd was a three-sport star in baseball, football, and basketball. In basketball, he led his high school to the Class AA Sectional Playoffs. He hit .508 with 130 RBI during the final two years of his high school career and led his team to the Illinois Class AA state baseball championship as a senior. He was heavily recruited by Arizona State University, Stanford, and Creighton University and signed a letter of intent to play for head coach Jim Hendry at Creighton. However, when the Montreal Expos drafted him as the 14th pick in the 1st round of the 1991 Major League Baseball draft, Floyd chose to go to the minor leagues.

== Major league career ==
=== Montreal Expos ===
Prior to being called up by the Expos, Floyd won The Sporting News Minor League Player of the Year Award in 1993 after successful stints with the Harrisburg Senators of the Eastern League and Triple-A Ottawa Lynx. He made his major league debut that same year at only 21 years old, playing in 10 games with the Expos. On June 27, 1994, Floyd hit a home run off Atlanta Braves pitcher Greg Maddux at Olympic Stadium on a pitch that was low, by golfing the ball out in what would become a signature moment in the Expos dominant but strike-shortened 1994 season. Although Floyd never showed the power that was to come in later years during his first tenure with the Expos, he has expressed fondness for his time in Montreal, crediting his initial experience there for helping him grow both professionally and as a person.

=== Florida Marlins ===
In 1997, Floyd was traded from the Expos to the Florida Marlins for Dustin Hermanson and Joe Orsulak. He won his lone World Series with the franchise in 1997. In 1998, Floyd earned a starting position in the Marlins' outfield. In 2000, in 420 at-bats, he hit .300 with 22 home runs and 91 RBI, including two walk-off home runs. In 2001, Floyd hit 31 home runs and set career highs with a .317 batting average and 103 RBIs in 149 games and was selected to play in his first and only All-Star Game.

=== Second stint with Expos ===
In 2002, Floyd was traded from the Marlins back to the Expos, with Claudio Vargas, Wilton Guerrero, and cash, for Graeme Lloyd, Mike Mordecai, Carl Pavano, Justin Wayne, and Donald Levinski. His second stint with the Expos was short-lived; he appeared in only 15 games before being traded.

=== Boston Red Sox ===
On July 30, 2002, Floyd was traded from the Expos to the Boston Red Sox for Sun-woo Kim and Song Seung-jun. Theories swirled around baseball as to the move (along with several others done by the Expos that year), with critics suggesting the MLB-owned Expos had traded Floyd in order to help the Red Sox. Floyd hit .317 in 47 games for the Red Sox.

=== New York Mets ===
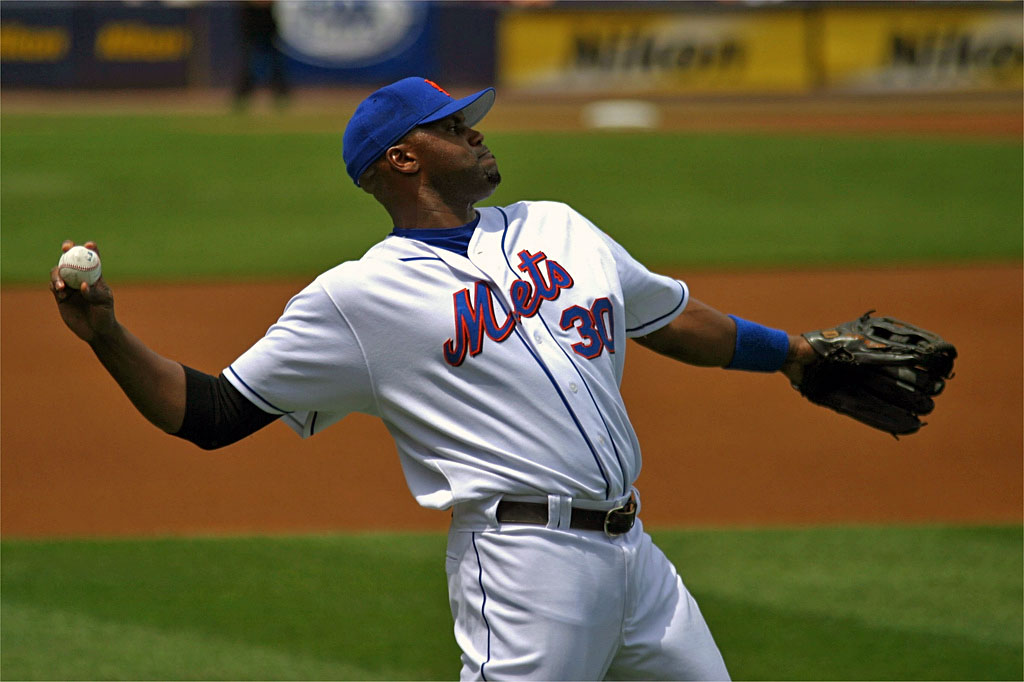
Floyd with the Mets

In 2003, Floyd was signed by the New York Mets. He played well for the Mets, but was hampered by injuries in 2003 and 2004. However, Floyd stayed healthy in 2005 and responded with a career-high and team-leading 34 home runs. The next year, though, Floyd was once again limited by injuries and only played in 97 games during New York's division-winning year. He caught the division-clinching out for the Mets, but was slowed by injuries in the playoffs for New York, only recording twelve at-bats in his team's ten postseason games.

=== Chicago Cubs ===
On January 21, 2007, Floyd agreed to a one-year, $3 million deal with his hometown Chicago Cubs for the 2007 season. The deal included multiple incentives and an option for 2008. Floyd missed nine games in August 2007 to mourn the death of his father, Cornelius. He returned on August 21, 2007, to play the San Francisco Giants, where he drove in the winning runs in the top of the 9th.

=== Tampa Bay Rays ===
On December 14, 2007, Floyd signed a $3 million, one-year contract with the Tampa Bay Rays. Floyd spent 2008 platooning for the Rays at DH against righties.

=== San Diego Padres ===
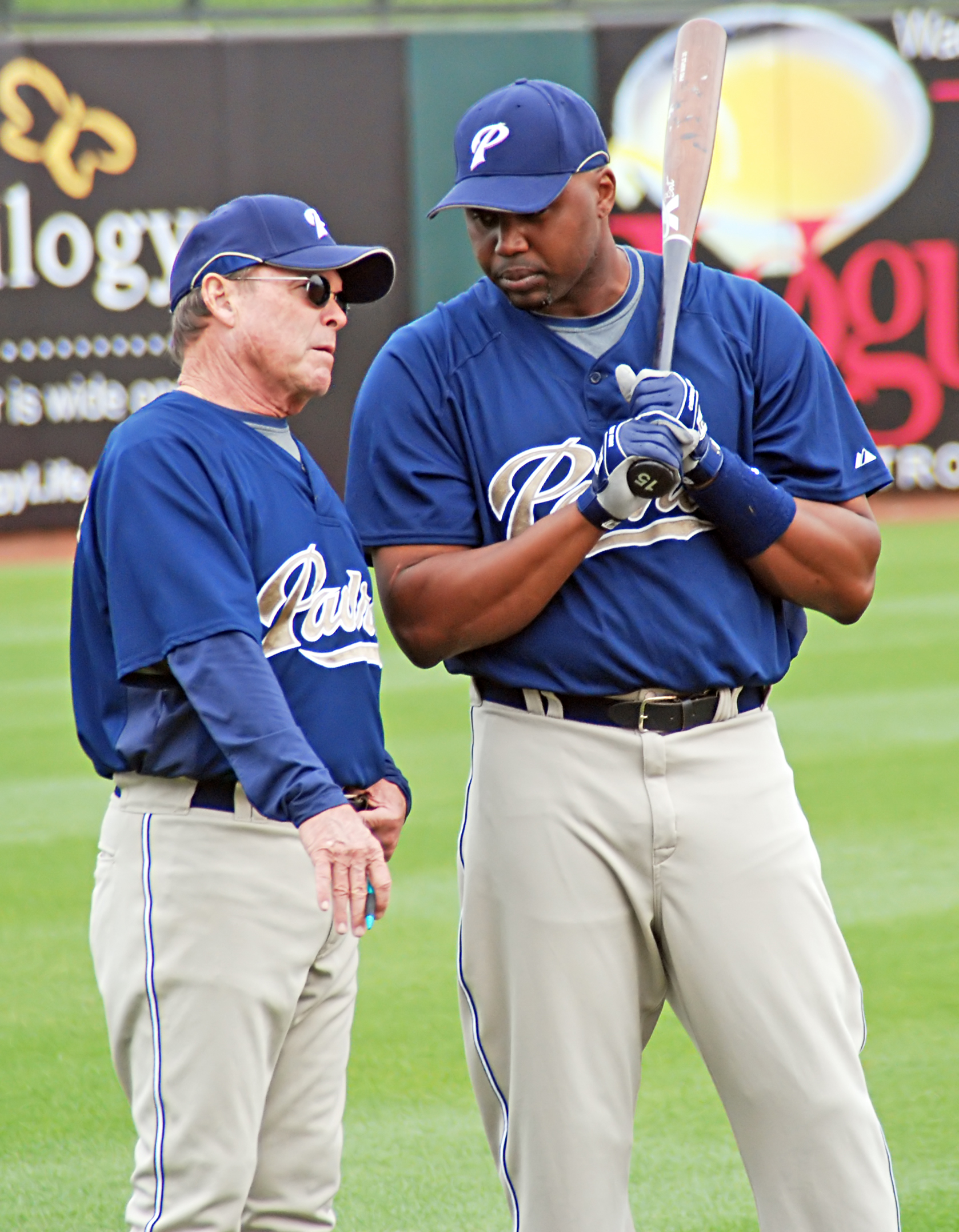
Floyd talking to hitting coach Jim Lefebvre for the San Diego Padres on March 5, 2009

On February 5, 2009, Floyd agreed to a one-year contract with the San Diego Padres. On October 8, 2009, the Padres released Floyd.

=== Career statistics ===
In 1621 games over 17 seasons, Floyd posted a .278 batting average (1,479-for-5,319) with 824 runs, 340 doubles, 23 triples, 233 home runs, 865 RBI, 148 stolen bases, 601 bases on balls, .358 on-base percentage and .482 slugging percentage. He finished his career with a .980 fielding percentage playing at all three outfield positions and at first base. In 19 postseason games, he batted .216 (8-for-37) scoring 7 runs with 2 home runs and 4 RBI.

== Broadcasting career ==
On February 22, 2010, Floyd accepted a broadcasting job with Fox Sports Florida.

Floyd made his debut in the broadcasting booth for FOX Sports' Baseball Night in America on June 21, 2014.

In 2015, Floyd joined SportsNet New York where he would be an analyst for New York Mets games. On March 8, 2015, Floyd broadcast his first Mets game, a spring training game against the Boston Red Sox on WPIX-TV, with Gary Cohen doing play-by-play.

Floyd is currently a co-host on SiriusXM's MLB Network Radio and Fantasy Sports Radio. He is also a contributor to the MLB Network, occasionally appearing on its flagship studio show MLB Tonight.

In 2018, Floyd joined Sportsnet to become a featured analyst for the network's Toronto Blue Jays coverage.

In 2022, Floyd joined the Marquee Sports Network as a studio analyst and also appeared on Apple TV+ Friday Night Baseball as one of three rotating analysts.

== Personal life ==
Floyd lives in Florida with his longtime companion Maryanne Manning, the couple's three children (Bria, Tobias, and Layla), his mother, and the two children of his sister Shanta. Shanta died in 2006 after a long battle with cancer.

In 1997, Floyd appeared in a Season 23 episode of Saturday Night Live in full Florida Marlins uniform with fourteen other MLB players.

He appeared on Season 9 and 10 of Dragons' Den.
