= Randall Delgado =

Panamanian baseball player (born 1990)

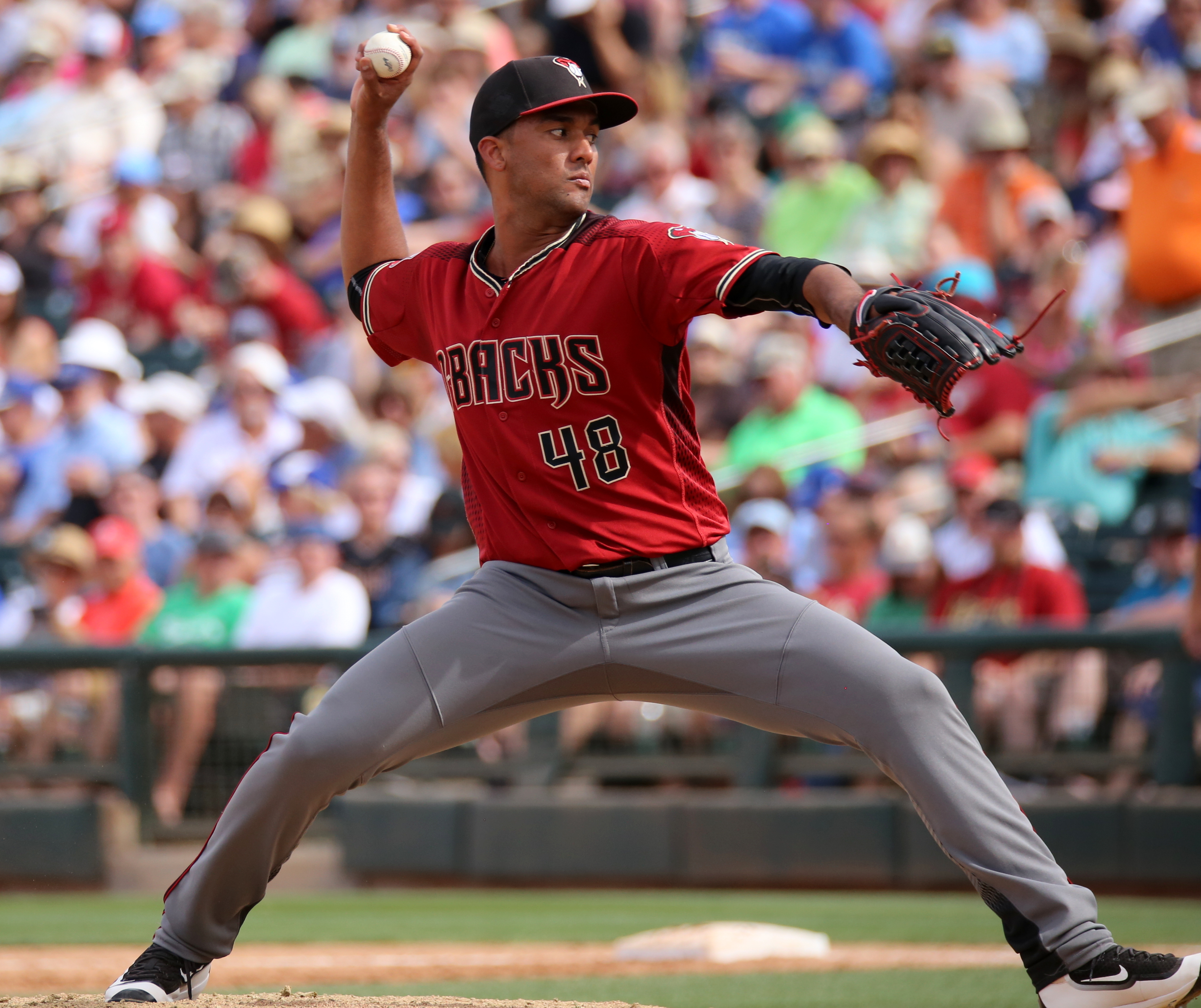
- Delgado with the Arizona Diamondbacks
- Pitcher
- Born: February 9, 1990 (age 36); Las Tablas, Panama
- Batted: Right Threw: Right

Professional debut
- MLB: June 17, 2011, for the Atlanta Braves
- CPBL: September 5, 2023, for the Uni-President Lions

Last appearance
- MLB: 2018, for the Arizona Diamondbacks
- CPBL: October 21, 2023, for the Uni-President Lions

MLB statistics
- Win–loss record: 30–29
- Earned run average: 4.10
- Strikeouts: 465

CPBL statistics
- Win–loss record: 5–2
- Earned run average: 2.91
- Strikeouts: 19
- Stats at Baseball Reference

Teams
- Atlanta Braves (2011–2012); Arizona Diamondbacks (2013–2018); Uni-President Lions (2023)

Randall Enrique Delgado (born February 9, 1990) is a Panamanian former professional baseball pitcher. He has previously played in Major League Baseball (MLB) for the Atlanta Braves and Arizona Diamondbacks, and in the Chinese Professional Baseball League (CPBL) for the Uni-President Lions.

== Professional career ==
=== Atlanta Braves ===
Delgado began the 2011 season with the Double–A Mississippi Braves. On June 16, 2011, the Braves announced that Delgado would be called up to make his Major League debut in a spot-start against the Texas Rangers on June 17. Delgado was given the opportunity because regular Braves starter Tommy Hanson was scratched due to right shoulder tendinitis. The debut was somewhat shaky for Delgado, as he gave up three runs (one unearned) over four innings of work, taking the loss for the game. Delgado returned to the Mississippi Braves and was later promoted to the Braves' Triple–A affiliate in Gwinnett. He was called up for the second time in August, once again to start in place of an injured Hanson. Facing the San Francisco Giants he pitched six hitless innings in which he faced the minimum number of batters before giving up a home run to Cody Ross to start the seventh inning and leaving the game. He received a no-decision and was optioned back to Gwinnett the next day. In 7 starts, Delgado finished 1–1 with a 2.83 ERA.

Randall's first career Major League hit came on April 22, 2012, against the Arizona Diamondbacks off of Ian Kennedy. On July 15, Delgado was optioned to Triple-A Gwinnett. In 17 starts and 1 relief appearance, Delgado finished with a record of 4–9 in 92.2 innings.

=== Arizona Diamondbacks ===
After the 2012 season, the Braves traded Delgado with Martín Prado, Nick Ahmed, Zeke Spruill and Brandon Drury to the Arizona Diamondbacks for Justin Upton and Chris Johnson. He spent the 2013 season between the minors and the Diamondbacks rotation. In 20 games, 19 starts, Delgado pitched to a 4.26 ERA in 116.1 innings while recording a record of 5–7. The following seasons after 2013, he has spent the majority of the time pitching out of the Arizona bullpen, serving as a long reliever and occasional spot starter.

In 2014, Delgado was ejected from a game against the Pittsburgh Pirates after hitting Andrew McCutchen with a fastball. There had already been warnings issued before the game after Paul Goldschmidt was hit on his hand the previous night by Ernesto Frieri. He was not suspended by MLB for the incident.

His best season came in 2015 when he pitched to a career best 3.25 ERA in 64 games. He suffered an oblique injury in spring training of 2018 and was placed on the disabled list to begin the season. He was activated off the 60 day disabled list on July 8. Delgado was designated for assignment on July 25, 2018. He was released by the organization on July 31, and later re-signed to a minor-league contract on August 18 and was assigned to the Triple-A Reno Aces. He elected free agency on October 29, 2018.

=== Chicago White Sox ===
On January 12, 2019, Delgado signed a minor league deal with the Chicago White Sox. He was released on March 20, 2019.

=== Kansas City T-Bones ===
On April 15, 2019, Delgado signed with the Kansas City T-Bones of the independent American Association.

=== New York Yankees ===
On May 24, 2019, Delgado's contract was purchased by the New York Yankees and he was assigned to the Triple-A Scranton/Wilkes-Barre RailRiders. In 10 starts for Scranton, he struggled to a 2–5 record and 6.49 ERA with 44 strikeouts across 51 1/3 innings pitched. Delgado elected free agency following the season on November 4.

=== Gastonia Honey Hunters ===
On May 6, 2022, Delgado signed with the Gastonia Honey Hunters of the Atlantic League of Professional Baseball. In 16 games (7 starts) for Gastonia, Delgado pitched to a 3.23 ERA with 42 strikeouts and one save in 39 innings of work. He was released by the Honey Hunters on September 1.

=== Lake Country DockHounds ===
On June 6, 2023, Delgado signed with the Lake Country DockHounds of the American Association of Professional Baseball. In 10 starts for the DockHounds, he posted a 5–2 record and 3.88 ERA with 61 strikeouts in 60 1/3 innings pitched.

=== Uni-President Lions ===
On August 4, 2023, Delgado's contract was purchased by the Uni-President Lions of the Chinese Professional Baseball League (CPBL) in Taiwan. In his sole season in Taiwan, Delgado appeared in 7 regular season games, recorded 5 wins and 2 losses, and an ERA of 2.91.

=== Leones de Yucatán ===
On January 31, 2024, Delgado signed with the Leones de Yucatán of the Mexican League. In 8 starts for Yucatán, he logged a 3–2 record and 3.47 ERA with 27 strikeouts across 36 1/3 innings pitched. On June 18, Delgado was released by the Leones.

== International career ==
Delgado was selected to represent Panama at the 2023 World Baseball Classic qualification.

== Pitching style ==
Delgado throws five pitches: a four-seam fastball (90–93 mph), a two-seam fastball (88–91), a curveball (76–79), a changeup (79–83), and an occasional slider to right-handed hitters.
