= List of Silver Slugger Award winners at outfield =

Award for best offensive players at baseball leagues

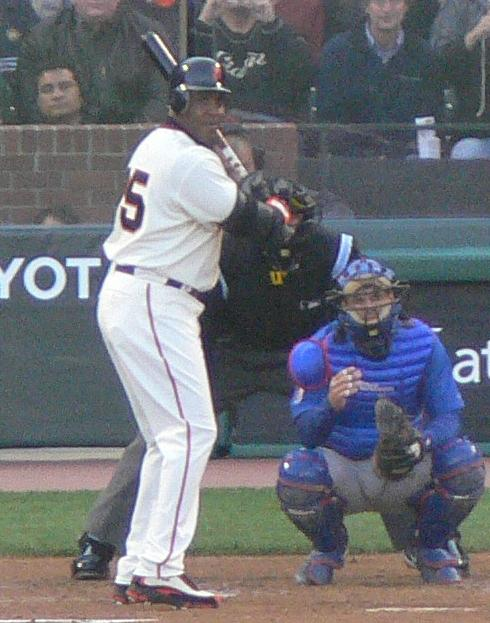
Barry Bonds has won 12 Silver Slugger Awards, the most of any player at any position.

The Silver Slugger Award is awarded annually to the best offensive player at each position in both the American League (AL) and the National League (NL), as determined by the coaches and managers of Major League Baseball (MLB). These voters consider several offensive categories in selecting the winners, including batting average, slugging percentage, and on-base percentage, in addition to "coaches' and managers' general impressions of a player's overall offensive value". Managers and coaches are not permitted to vote for players on their own team. The Silver Slugger was first awarded in 1980 and is given by Hillerich & Bradsby, the manufacturer of Louisville Slugger bats. The award is a bat-shaped trophy, 3 feet (91 cm) tall, engraved with the names of each of the winners from the league and plated with sterling silver.

As with the Rawlings Gold Glove Award, the prize is presented to outfielders irrespective of their specific position. This means that it is possible for three left fielders, or any other combination of outfielders, to win the award in the same year, rather than one left fielder, one center fielder, and one right fielder. It is also possible for outfield teammates to win the award in the same season, which has happened eight times since 1980.

Among outfielders and among all Silver Slugger winners, Barry Bonds has won the most awards, winning twelve times between 1990 and 2004. All of his awards were won in the National League. Mike Trout leads the American League with nine wins, followed by Manny Ramirez with eight. Ken Griffey Jr., Vladimir Guerrero, and Tony Gwynn have each won seven Silver Sluggers in the outfield; Mookie Betts, Juan González, Kirby Puckett, Sammy Sosa and Juan Soto have won six times. Four players have won five times (Albert Belle, Ryan Braun, Aaron Judge and Dave Winfield), and four-time winners include Andre Dawson, Matt Holliday, Andrew McCutchen, Dale Murphy and Gary Sheffield. There have also been 12 three-time outfield winners and 29 two-time awardees. The most recent winners are Jackson Chourio, Pete Crow-Armstrong, and James Wood in the National League, and Randy Arozarena, Chase DeLauter and Riley Greene in the American League.

Gwynn posted the highest batting average in an outfielder's winning season, batting .394 in the 1994 season before it was truncated by the players' strike. Magglio Ordóñez' 2007 average is the best in the American League (.363). Bonds, the overall leader, holds three records: on-base percentage (.609 in 2004), slugging percentage (.863 in 2001) and home runs (73 in 2001). The American League leaders in those categories include Belle (.714 slugging percentage in 1994), Aaron Judge (62 home runs in 2022), and Trout (.460 on-base percentage in 2018). Ramírez also leads both leagues in runs batted in (RBI) during an outfielder's winning season, with 165 in 1999. Sosa is the National League leader (160 RBI in 2001).

== Key ==
Year	Links to the corresponding Major League Baseball season
AVG	Batting average
OBP	On-base percentage
SLG	Slugging percentage
HR	Home runs
RBI	Runs batted in
Ref	References
*	Winner of the most Silver Sluggers in Major League Baseball as an outfielder
†	Member of the National Baseball Hall of Fame and Museum

== American League winners ==
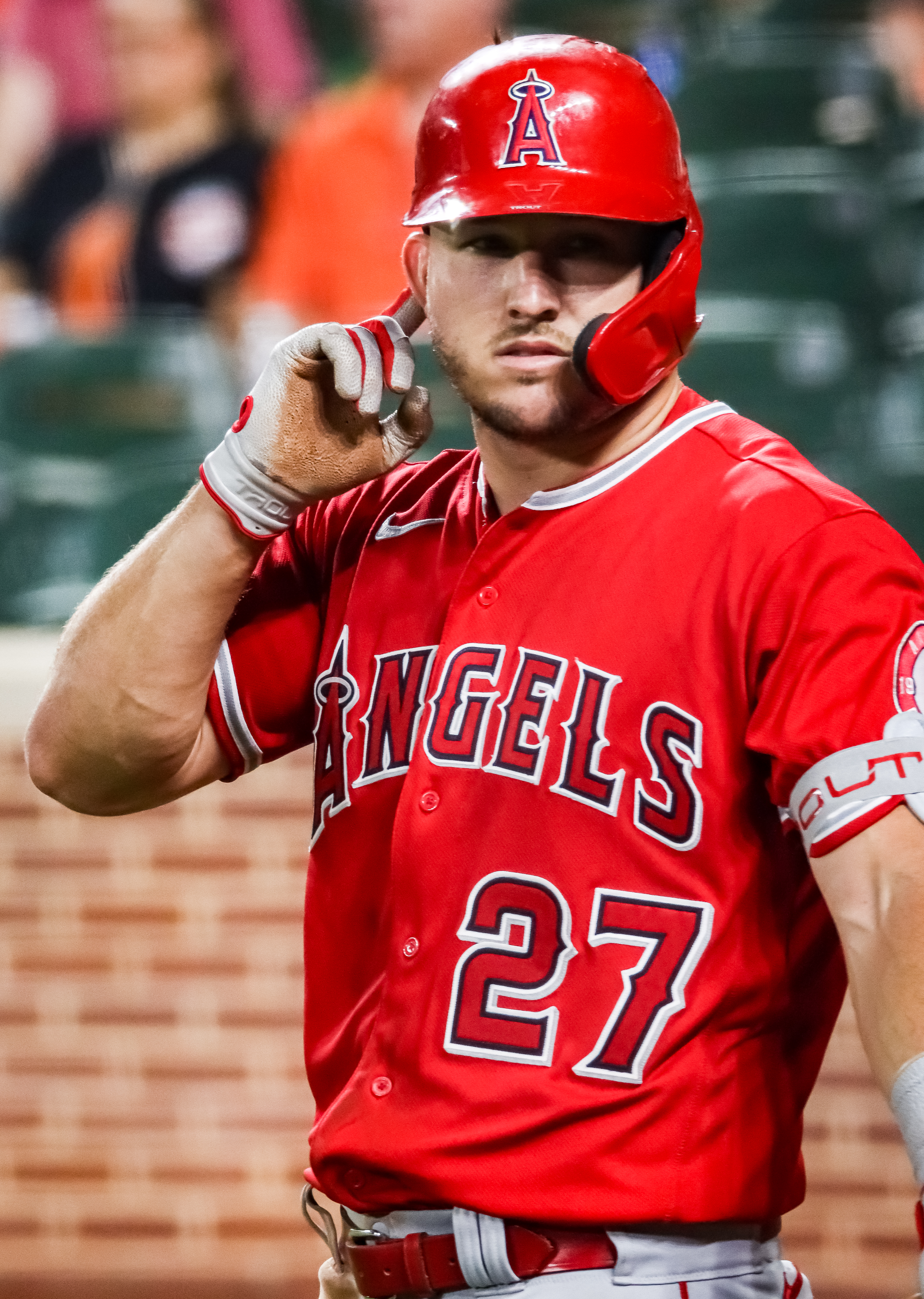
Mike Trout has won more AL Silver Slugger Awards at outfield than any other player.

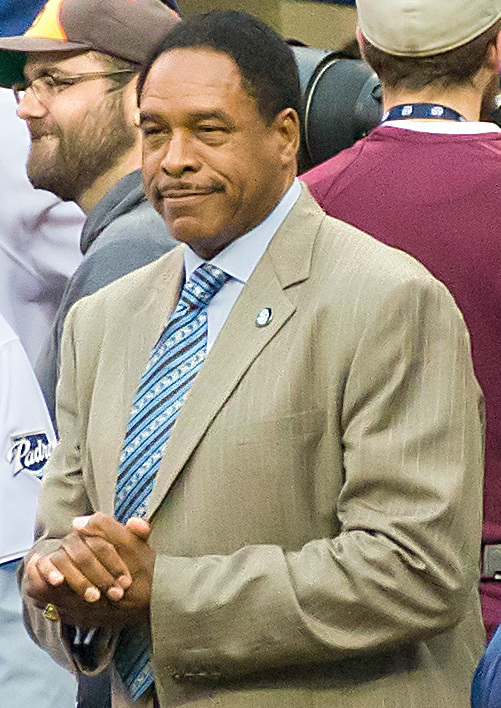
Dave Winfield won the AL Silver Slugger Award at outfield in five consecutive seasons (1981–1985), the most of any player.

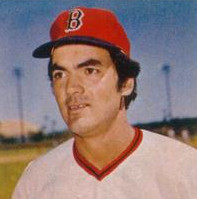
Dwight Evans went six seasons between AL Silver Slugger Award at outfield (1981–1987), tied with Ichiro for the longest such gap (2001–2007).

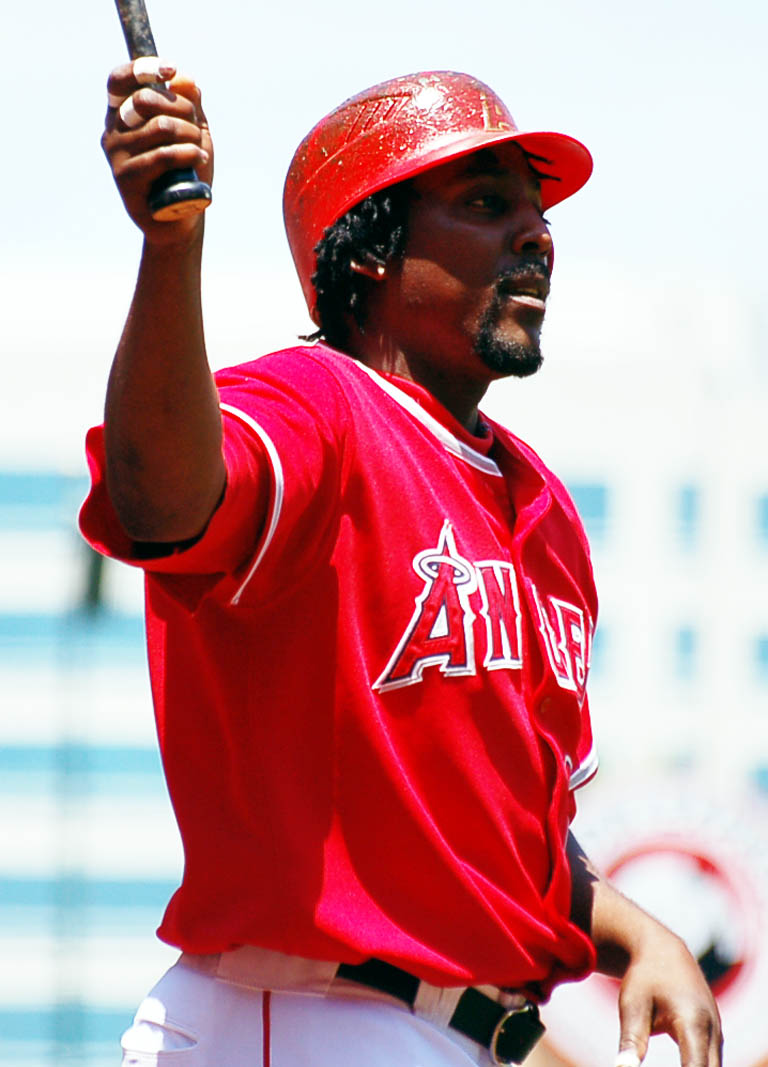
Vladimir Guerrero is one of only two players to win multiple Silver Slugger Awards at outfield in both leagues.

Year	Player	Team	AVG	OBP	SLG	HR	RBI	Ref
1980	Ben Oglivie	Milwaukee Brewers	.304	.362	.563	41	118	
1980	Al Oliver	Texas Rangers	.319	.357	.480	19	117	
1980	Willie Wilson	Kansas City Royals	.326	.357	.421	3	49	
1981	Dwight Evans	Boston Red Sox	.296	.415	.522	22	71	
1981	Rickey Henderson^{†}	Oakland Athletics	.319	.408	.437	6	35	
1981	Dave Winfield^{†}	New York Yankees	.294	.360	.464	13	68	
1982	Reggie Jackson^{†}	California Angels	.275	.375	.532	39	101	
1982	Willie Wilson (2)	Kansas City Royals	.332	.365	.431	3	46	
1982	Dave Winfield^{†} (2)	New York Yankees	.280	.331	.560	37	106	
1983	Lloyd Moseby	Toronto Blue Jays	.315	.376	.499	18	81	
1983	Jim Rice^{†}	Boston Red Sox	.305	.361	.550	39	126	
1983	Dave Winfield^{†} (3)	New York Yankees	.283	.345	.513	32	116	
1984	Tony Armas	Boston Red Sox	.268	.300	.531	43	123	
1984	Jim Rice^{†} (2)	Boston Red Sox	.280	.323	.467	28	122	
1984	Dave Winfield^{†} (4)	New York Yankees	.340	.393	.515	19	100	
1985	George Bell	Toronto Blue Jays	.275	.327	.479	28	95	
1985	Rickey Henderson^{†} (2)	New York Yankees	.314	.419	.516	24	72	
1985	Dave Winfield^{†} (5)	New York Yankees	.275	.328	.471	26	114	
1986	Jesse Barfield	Toronto Blue Jays	.289	.368	.559	40	108	
1986	George Bell (2)	Toronto Blue Jays	.309	.349	.532	31	108	
1986	Kirby Puckett^{†}	Minnesota Twins	.328	.366	.537	31	96	
1987	George Bell (3)	Toronto Blue Jays	.308	.352	.605	47	134	
1987	Dwight Evans (2)	Boston Red Sox	.305	.417	.569	34	123	
1987	Kirby Puckett^{†} (2)	Minnesota Twins	.332	.367	.534	28	99	
1988	Jose Canseco	Oakland Athletics	.307	.391	.569	42	124	
1988	Mike Greenwell	Boston Red Sox	.325	.416	.531	22	119	
1988	Kirby Puckett^{†} (3)	Minnesota Twins	.356	.375	.545	24	121	
1989	Kirby Puckett^{†} (4)	Minnesota Twins	.339	.379	.465	9	85	
1989	Rubén Sierra	Texas Rangers	.306	.347	.543	29	119	
1989	Robin Yount^{†}	Milwaukee Brewers	.318	.384	.511	21	103	
1990	Ellis Burks	Boston Red Sox	.296	.349	.486	21	89	
1990	Jose Canseco (2)	Oakland Athletics	.274	.371	.543	37	101	
1990	Rickey Henderson^{†} (3)	Oakland Athletics	.325	.439	.577	28	61	
1991	Jose Canseco (3)	Oakland Athletics	.266	.359	.556	44	122	
1991	Joe Carter	Toronto Blue Jays	.273	.330	.503	33	108	
1991	Ken Griffey Jr.^{†}	Seattle Mariners	.327	.399	.527	22	100	
1992	Joe Carter (2)	Toronto Blue Jays	.264	.309	.498	34	119	
1992	Juan González	Texas Rangers	.260	.304	.529	43	109	
1992	Kirby Puckett^{†} (5)	Minnesota Twins	.329	.374	.490	19	110	
1993	Albert Belle	Cleveland Indians	.290	.370	.552	38	129	
1993	Juan González (2)	Texas Rangers	.310	.368	.632	46	118	
1993	Ken Griffey Jr.^{†} (2)	Seattle Mariners	.309	.408	.617	45	109	
1994	Albert Belle (2)	Cleveland Indians	.357	.438	.714	36	101	
1994	Ken Griffey Jr.^{†} (3)	Seattle Mariners	.323	.402	.674	40	90	
1994	Kirby Puckett^{†} (6)	Minnesota Twins	.317	.362	.540	20	112	
1995	Albert Belle (3)	Cleveland Indians	.317	.401	.690	50	126	
1995	Manny Ramirez	Cleveland Indians	.308	.402	.558	31	107	
1995	Tim Salmon	California Angels	.330	.429	.594	34	105	
1996	Albert Belle (4)	Cleveland Indians	.311	.410	.623	48	148	
1996	Juan González (3)	Texas Rangers	.314	.368	.643	47	144	
1996	Ken Griffey Jr.^{†} (4)	Seattle Mariners	.303	.392	.628	49	140	
1997	David Justice (2)	Cleveland Indians	.329	.418	.596	33	101	
1997	Juan González (4)	Texas Rangers	.296	.335	.589	42	131	
1997	Ken Griffey Jr.^{†} (5)	Seattle Mariners	.304	.382	.646	56	147	
1998	Albert Belle (5)	Chicago White Sox	.328	.399	.655	49	152	
1998	Juan González (5)	Texas Rangers	.318	.366	.630	45	157	
1998	Ken Griffey Jr.^{†} (6)	Seattle Mariners	.284	.365	.611	56	146	
1999	Shawn Green	Toronto Blue Jays	.309	.384	.588	42	123	
1999	Ken Griffey Jr.^{†} (7)	Seattle Mariners	.285	.384	.576	48	134	
1999	Manny Ramirez (2)	Cleveland Indians	.333	.442	.663	44	165	
2000	Darin Erstad	Anaheim Angels	.355	.409	.541	25	100	
2000	Magglio Ordóñez	Chicago White Sox	.315	.371	.546	32	126	
2000	Manny Ramirez (3)	Cleveland Indians	.351	.457	.697	38	122	
2001	Juan González (6)	Cleveland Indians	.325	.370	.590	35	140	
2001	Manny Ramirez (4)	Boston Red Sox	.306	.405	.609	41	125	
2001	Ichiro Suzuki	Seattle Mariners	.350	.381	.457	8	69	
2002	Garret Anderson	Anaheim Angels	.306	.332	.539	29	123	
2002	Magglio Ordóñez (2)	Chicago White Sox	.320	.381	.597	38	135	
2002	Bernie Williams	New York Yankees	.333	.415	.493	19	102	
2003	Garret Anderson (2)	Anaheim Angels	.315	.345	.541	29	116	
2003	Manny Ramirez (5)	Boston Red Sox	.325	.427	.587	37	104	
2003	Vernon Wells	Toronto Blue Jays	.317	.359	.550	33	117	
2004	Vladimir Guerrero^{†} (4)	Anaheim Angels	.337	.391	.598	39	126	
2004	Manny Ramirez (6)	Boston Red Sox	.308	.397	.613	43	130	
2004	Gary Sheffield (3)	New York Yankees	.290	.393	.534	36	121	
2005	Vladimir Guerrero^{†} (5)	Los Angeles Angels of Anaheim	.317	.394	.565	32	108	
2005	Manny Ramirez (7)	Boston Red Sox	.292	.388	.594	45	144	
2005	Gary Sheffield (4)	New York Yankees	.291	.379	.512	34	123	
2006	Jermaine Dye	Chicago White Sox	.315	.385	.622	44	120	
2006	Vladimir Guerrero^{†} (6)	Los Angeles Angels of Anaheim	.329	.382	.552	33	116	
2006	Manny Ramirez (8)	Boston Red Sox	.321	.439	.619	35	102	
2007	Vladimir Guerrero^{†} (7)	Los Angeles Angels of Anaheim	.324	.403	.547	27	125	
2007	Magglio Ordóñez (3)	Detroit Tigers	.363	.434	.595	28	139	
2007	Ichiro Suzuki (2)	Seattle Mariners	.351	.396	.431	6	68	
2008	Josh Hamilton	Texas Rangers	.304	.371	.530	32	130	
2008	Carlos Quentin	Chicago White Sox	.288	.394	.571	36	100	
2008	Grady Sizemore	Cleveland Indians	.268	.374	.502	33	90	
2009	Jason Bay	Boston Red Sox	.267	.384	.537	36	119	
2009	Torii Hunter	Los Angeles Angels of Anaheim	.299	.366	.508	22	90	
2009	Ichiro Suzuki (3)	Seattle Mariners	.352	.386	.465	11	46	
2010	José Bautista	Toronto Blue Jays	.260	.378	.465	54	124	
2010	Carl Crawford	Tampa Bay Rays	.307	.356	.495	19	90	
2010	Josh Hamilton (2)	Texas Rangers	.359	.411	.633	32	100	
2011	Curtis Granderson	New York Yankees	.262	.364	.552	41	119	
2011	José Bautista (2)	Toronto Blue Jays	.302	.447	.608	43	103	
2011	Jacoby Ellsbury	Boston Red Sox	.321	.376	.552	32	105	
2012	Josh Hamilton (3)	Texas Rangers	.285	.354	.577	43	128	
2012	Mike Trout	Los Angeles Angels of Anaheim	.326	.399	.564	30	83	
2012	Josh Willingham	Minnesota Twins	.260	.366	.524	35	110	
2013	Torii Hunter (2)	Detroit Tigers	.304	.334	.465	17	84	
2013	Adam Jones	Baltimore Orioles	.285	.318	.493	33	108	
2013	Mike Trout (2)	Los Angeles Angels of Anaheim	.323	.432	.557	27	97	
2014	José Bautista (3)	Toronto Blue Jays	.286	.403	.524	35	103	
2014	Michael Brantley	Cleveland Indians	.327	.385	.506	20	97	
2014	Mike Trout (3)	Los Angeles Angels of Anaheim	.287	.377	.561	36	111	
2015	Nelson Cruz	Seattle Mariners	.302	.369	.419	44	93	
2015	J. D. Martinez	Detroit Tigers	.282	.344	.535	38	102	
2015	Mike Trout (4)	Los Angeles Angels of Anaheim	.299	.402	.590	41	90	
2016	Mookie Betts	Boston Red Sox	.318	.363	.534	31	113	
2016	Mike Trout (5)	Los Angeles Angels of Anaheim	.315	.441	.550	29	100	
2016	Mark Trumbo	Baltimore Orioles	.256	.316	.533	47	108	
2017	Aaron Judge	New York Yankees	.284	.422	.627	52	114	
2017	George Springer	Houston Astros	.283	.367	.522	34	85	
2017	Justin Upton	Detroit Tigers; Los Angeles Angels	.273	.361	.540	35	109	
2018	Mookie Betts (2)	Boston Red Sox	.346	.438	.640	32	80	
2018	J. D. Martinez (2)	Boston Red Sox	.330	.402	.629	43	130	
2018	Mike Trout (6)	Los Angeles Angels	.312	.460	.628	39	79	
2019	Mookie Betts (3)	Boston Red Sox	.295	.391	.524	29	80	
2019	George Springer (2)	Houston Astros	.292	.383	.581	39	96	
2019	Mike Trout (7)	Los Angeles Angels	.291	.438	.645	45	104	
2020	Teoscar Hernández	Toronto Blue Jays	.289	.340	.579	16	34	
2020	Eloy Jiménez	Chicago White Sox	.296	.332	.559	14	41	
2020	Mike Trout (8)	Los Angeles Angels	.281	.390	.603	17	46	
2021	Teoscar Hernández (2)	Toronto Blue Jays	.296	.346	.524	32	116	
2021	Aaron Judge (2)	New York Yankees	.287	.373	.544	39	98	
2021	Cedric Mullins	Baltimore Orioles	.291	.360	.518	30	59	
2022	Aaron Judge (3)	New York Yankees	.311	.425	.686	62	131	
2022	Julio Rodríguez	Seattle Mariners	.284	.345	.549	28	75	
2022	Mike Trout (9)	Los Angeles Angels	.283	.369	.630	40	80	
2023	Luis Robert Jr.	Chicago White Sox	.264	.315	.542	38	80	
2023	Julio Rodríguez (2)	Seattle Mariners	.275	.333	.485	32	103	
2023	Kyle Tucker	Houston Astros	.284	.369	.517	29	112	
2024	Aaron Judge (4)	New York Yankees	.322	.458	.701	58	144	
2024	Anthony Santander	Baltimore Orioles	.235	.308	.506	44	102	
2024	Juan Soto (5)	New York Yankees	.288	.419	.569	41	109	
2025	Byron Buxton	Minnesota Twins	.264	.327	.551	35	83	
2025	Riley Greene	Detroit Tigers	.258	.313	.493	36	111	
2025	Aaron Judge (5)	New York Yankees	.331	.457	.688	53	114	
2026	Randy Arozarena	Seattle Mariners	.281	.381	.484	26	79	
2026	Chase DeLauter	Cleveland Guardians	.287	.363	.457	16	67	
2026	Riley Greene (2)	Detroit Tigers	.280	.370	.474	21	75	

== National League winners ==
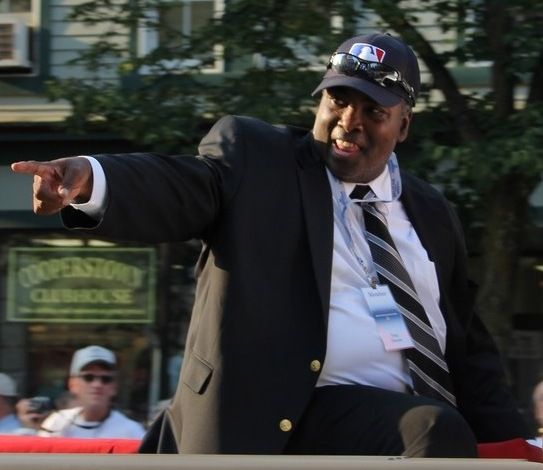
Tony Gwynn won seven NL Silver Slugger Awards at outfield, the most of anyone other than Barry Bonds.

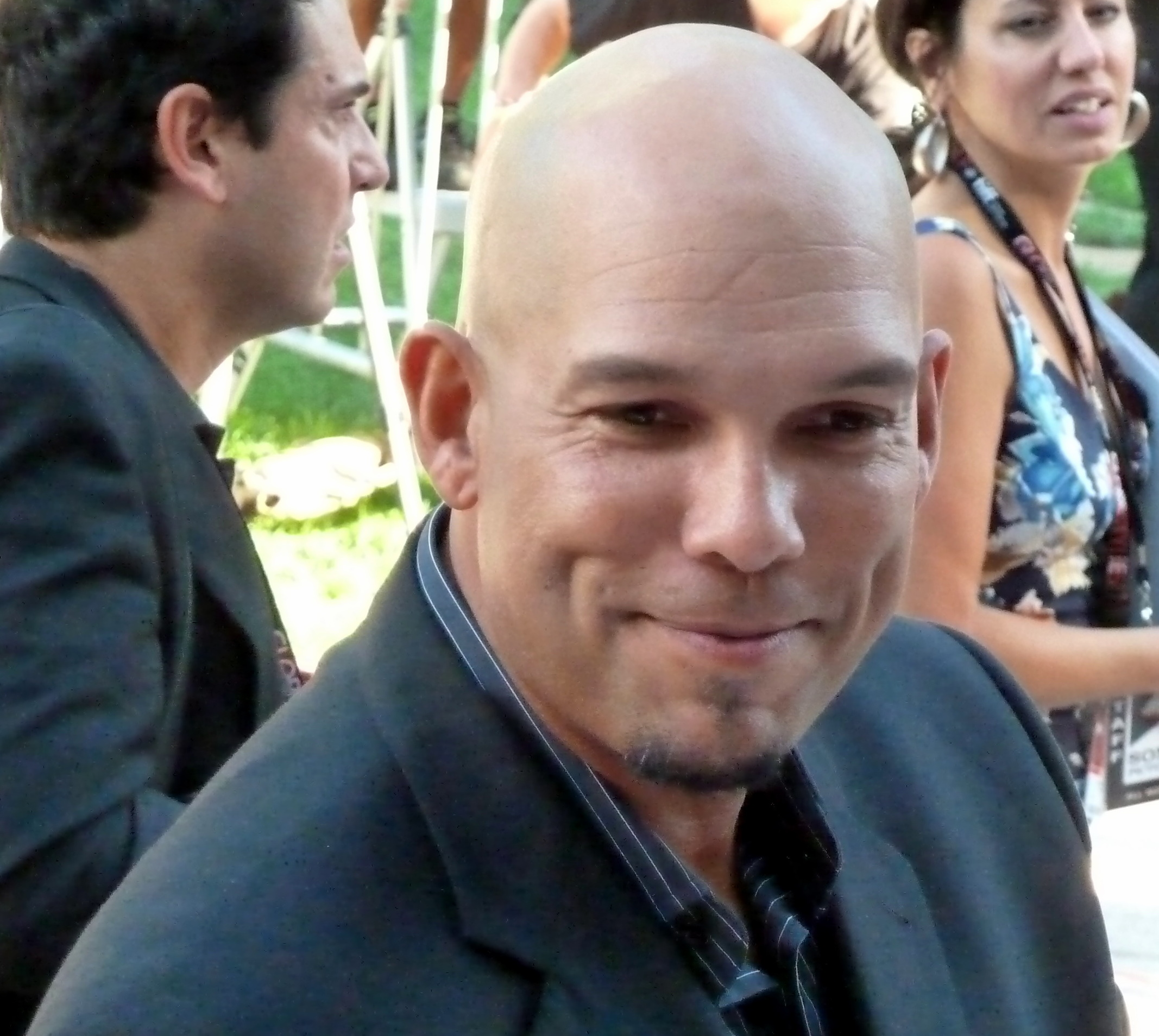
David Justice was the first player to win the Silver Slugger Award at outfield in both leagues.

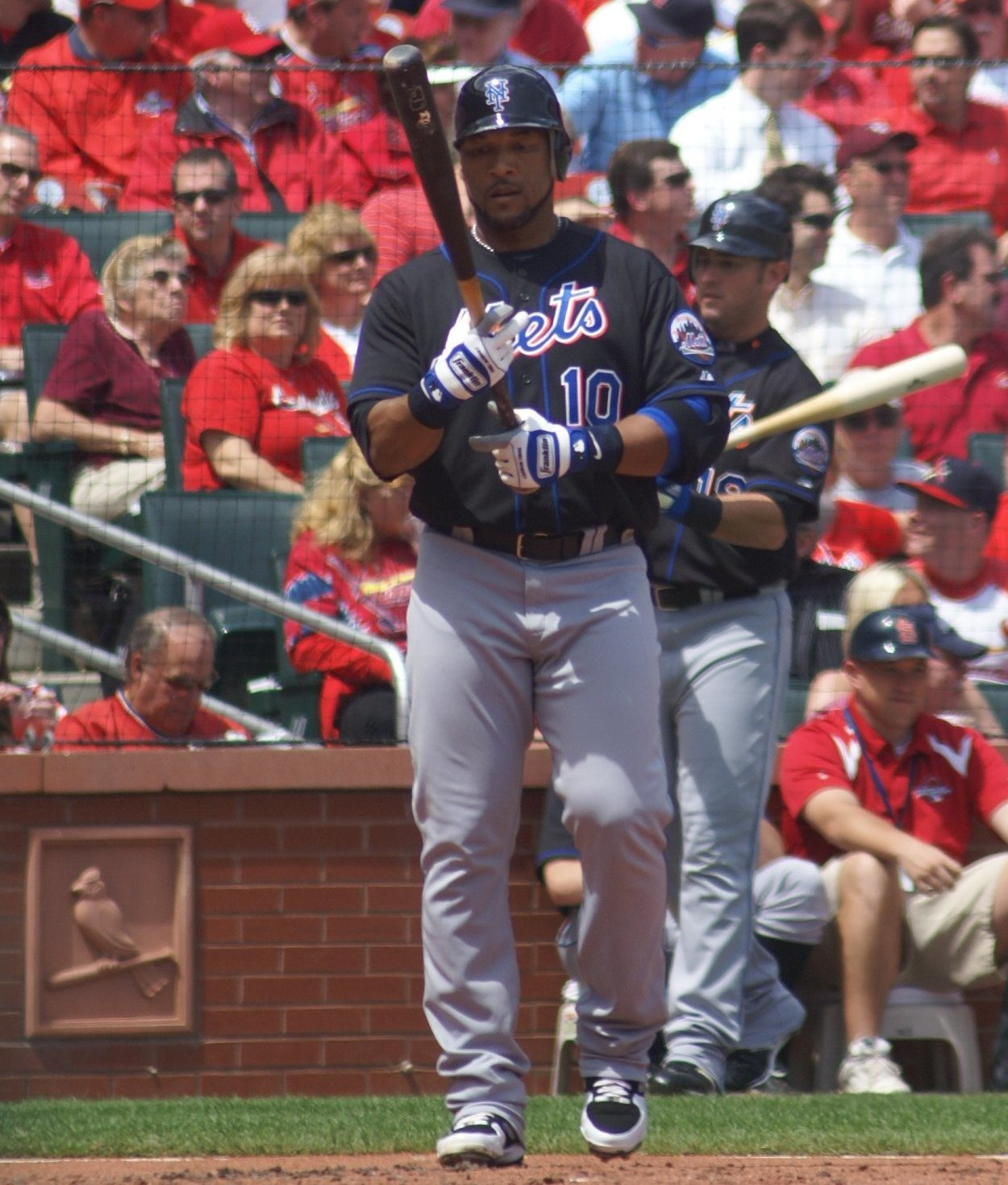
Gary Sheffield went six seasons between NL Silver Slugger Awards at outfield (1996–2003), the longest such gap.

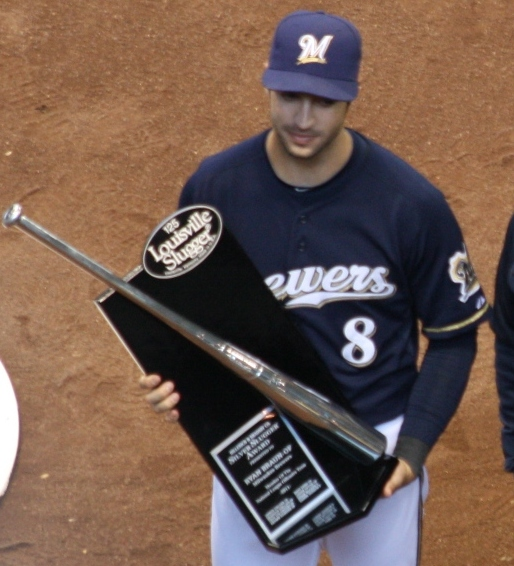
Ryan Braun is the most recent of three players to win five consecutive NL Silver Slugger Awards at outfield (2008–2012).

Year	Player	Team	AVG	OBP	SLG	HR	RBI	Ref
1980	Dusty Baker	Los Angeles Dodgers	.294	.339	.503	29	97	
1980	Andre Dawson^{†}	Montreal Expos	.308	.358	.492	17	87	
1980	George Hendrick	St. Louis Cardinals	.302	.342	.498	25	109	
1981	Dusty Baker (2)	Los Angeles Dodgers	.320	.363	.445	9	49	
1981	Andre Dawson^{†} (2)	Montreal Expos	.302	.365	.553	24	64	
1981	George Foster	Cincinnati Reds	.295	.373	.519	22	90	
1982	Leon Durham	Chicago Cubs	.312	.388	.521	22	90	
1982	Pedro Guerrero	Los Angeles Dodgers	.304	.378	.536	32	100	
1982	Dale Murphy	Atlanta Braves	.281	.378	.507	36	109	
1983	José Cruz	Houston Astros	.318	.385	.463	14	92	
1983	Andre Dawson^{†} (3)	Montreal Expos	.299	.338	.539	32	113	
1983	Dale Murphy (2)	Atlanta Braves	.302	.393	.540	36	121	
1984	José Cruz (2)	Houston Astros	.312	.381	.462	12	95	
1984	Tony Gwynn^{†}	San Diego Padres	.351	.410	.444	5	71	
1984	Dale Murphy (3)	Atlanta Braves	.290	.372	.547	36	100	
1985	Willie McGee	St. Louis Cardinals	.353	.384	.503	10	82	
1985	Dale Murphy (4)	Atlanta Braves	.300	.388	.539	37	111	
1985	Dave Parker^{†}	Cincinnati Reds	.312	.365	.551	34	125	
1986	Tony Gwynn^{†} (2)	San Diego Padres	.329	.381	.467	14	59	
1986	Dave Parker^{†} (2)	Cincinnati Reds	.273	.330	.477	31	116	
1986	Tim Raines^{†}	Montreal Expos	.334	.413	.476	9	62	
1987	Eric Davis	Cincinnati Reds	.293	.399	.593	37	100	
1987	Andre Dawson^{†} (4)	Chicago Cubs	.287	.328	.568	49	137	
1987	Tony Gwynn^{†} (3)	San Diego Padres	.370	.447	.511	7	54	
1988	Kirk Gibson	Los Angeles Dodgers	.290	.377	.483	25	76	
1988	Darryl Strawberry	New York Mets	.269	.366	.545	39	101	
1988	Andy Van Slyke	Pittsburgh Pirates	.288	.345	.506	25	100	
1989	Eric Davis (2)	Cincinnati Reds	.281	.367	.541	34	101	
1989	Tony Gwynn^{†} (4)	San Diego Padres	.336	.389	.424	4	62	
1989	Kevin Mitchell	San Francisco Giants	.291	.388	.635	47	125	
1990	Barry Bonds*	Pittsburgh Pirates	.301	.406	.565	33	114	
1990	Bobby Bonilla	Pittsburgh Pirates	.280	.322	.518	32	120	
1990	Darryl Strawberry (2)	Los Angeles Dodgers	.277	.361	.518	37	108	
1991	Barry Bonds* (2)	Pittsburgh Pirates	.292	.410	.514	25	116	
1991	Bobby Bonilla (2)	Pittsburgh Pirates	.302	.391	.492	18	100	
1991	Ron Gant	Atlanta Braves	.251	.338	.496	32	105	
1992	Barry Bonds* (3)	Pittsburgh Pirates	.311	.456	.624	34	103	
1992	Andy Van Slyke (2)	Pittsburgh Pirates	.324	.381	.505	14	89	
1992	Larry Walker^{†}	Montreal Expos	.301	.353	.506	23	93	
1993	Barry Bonds* (4)	San Francisco Giants	.336	.458	.677	46	123	
1993	Lenny Dykstra	Philadelphia Phillies	.305	.420	.482	19	66	
1993	David Justice	Atlanta Braves	.270	.357	.515	40	120	
1994	Moisés Alou	Montreal Expos	.339	.397	.592	22	78	
1994	Barry Bonds* (5)	San Francisco Giants	.312	.426	.647	37	81	
1994	Tony Gwynn^{†} (5)	San Diego Padres	.394	.454	.568	12	64	
1995	Dante Bichette	Colorado Rockies	.340	.364	.620	40	128	
1995	Tony Gwynn^{†} (6)	San Diego Padres	.368	.404	.484	9	90	
1995	Sammy Sosa	Chicago Cubs	.268	.340	.500	36	119	
1996	Barry Bonds* (6)	San Francisco Giants	.308	.461	.615	42	129	
1996	Ellis Burks	Colorado Rockies	.344	.408	.639	40	128	
1996	Gary Sheffield	Florida Marlins	.314	.465	.624	42	120	
1997	Barry Bonds* (7)	San Francisco Giants	.291	.446	.585	40	101	
1997	Tony Gwynn^{†} (7)	San Diego Padres	.372	.409	.547	17	119	
1997	Larry Walker^{†} (2)	Colorado Rockies	.366	.452	.720	49	130	
1998	Moisés Alou (2)	Houston Astros	.312	.399	.582	38	124	
1998	Sammy Sosa (2)	Chicago Cubs	.308	.377	.647	66	158	
1998	Greg Vaughn	San Diego Padres	.272	.363	.597	50	119	
1999	Vladimir Guerrero^{†}	Montreal Expos	.316	.378	.600	42	131	
1999	Sammy Sosa (3)	Chicago Cubs	.288	.367	.635	63	141	
1999	Larry Walker^{†} (3)	Colorado Rockies	.379	.458	.710	37	115	
2000	Barry Bonds* (8)	San Francisco Giants	.306	.440	.688	49	106	
2000	Vladimir Guerrero^{†} (2)	Montreal Expos	.345	.410	.664	44	123	
2000	Sammy Sosa (4)	Chicago Cubs	.320	.406	.634	50	138	
2001	Barry Bonds* (9)	San Francisco Giants	.328	.515	.863	73	137	
2001	Luis Gonzalez	Arizona Diamondbacks	.325	.429	.688	57	142	
2001	Sammy Sosa (5)	Chicago Cubs	.328	.437	.737	64	160	
2002	Barry Bonds* (10)	San Francisco Giants	.370	.582	.799	46	110	
2002	Vladimir Guerrero^{†} (3)	Montreal Expos	.336	.417	.593	39	111	
2002	Sammy Sosa (6)	Chicago Cubs	.288	.399	.594	49	108	
2003	Barry Bonds* (11)	San Francisco Giants	.341	.529	.749	45	90	
2003	Albert Pujols	St. Louis Cardinals	.359	.439	.667	43	124	
2003	Gary Sheffield (2)	Atlanta Braves	.330	.419	.604	39	132	
2004	Bobby Abreu	Philadelphia Phillies	.301	.428	.544	30	105	
2004	Barry Bonds* (12)	San Francisco Giants	.362	.609	.812	45	101	
2004	Jim Edmonds	St. Louis Cardinals	.301	.418	.643	42	111	
2005	Miguel Cabrera	Florida Marlins	.323	.385	.561	33	116	
2005	Andruw Jones^{†}	Atlanta Braves	.263	.347	.575	51	128	
2005	Carlos Lee	Milwaukee Brewers	.265	.324	.487	32	114	
2006	Carlos Beltrán^{†}	New York Mets	.275	.388	.594	41	116	
2006	Matt Holliday	Colorado Rockies	.326	.387	.586	34	114	
2006	Alfonso Soriano	Washington Nationals	.277	.351	.560	46	95	
2007	Carlos Beltrán^{†} (2)	New York Mets	.276	.353	.525	33	112	
2007	Matt Holliday (2)	Colorado Rockies	.340	.405	.607	36	137	
2007	Carlos Lee (2)	Houston Astros	.303	.354	.528	32	119	
2008	Ryan Braun	Milwaukee Brewers	.285	.335	.553	37	106	
2008	Matt Holliday (3)	Colorado Rockies	.321	.409	.538	25	88	
2008	Ryan Ludwick	St. Louis Cardinals	.299	.375	.591	37	113	
2009	Ryan Braun (2)	Milwaukee Brewers	.320	.386	.551	32	114	
2009	Andre Ethier	Los Angeles Dodgers	.272	.361	.508	31	106	
2009	Matt Kemp	Los Angeles Dodgers	.297	.352	.490	26	101	
2010	Ryan Braun (3)	Milwaukee Brewers	.304	.365	.501	25	103	
2010	Carlos González	Colorado Rockies	.336	.376	.598	34	117	
2010	Matt Holliday (4)	St. Louis Cardinals	.312	.390	.532	28	103	
2011	Ryan Braun (4)	Milwaukee Brewers	.332	.397	.597	33	111	
2011	Matt Kemp (2)	Los Angeles Dodgers	.324	.399	.586	39	126	
2011	Justin Upton	Arizona Diamondbacks	.289	.369	.529	31	88	
2012	Ryan Braun (5)	Milwaukee Brewers	.319	.391	.595	41	112	
2012	Jay Bruce	Cincinnati Reds	.252	.327	.514	34	99	
2012	Andrew McCutchen	Pittsburgh Pirates	.327	.400	.553	31	96	
2013	Jay Bruce (2)	Cincinnati Reds	.262	.329	.478	30	109	
2013	Michael Cuddyer	Colorado Rockies	.331	.389	.530	20	84	
2013	Andrew McCutchen (2)	Pittsburgh Pirates	.317	.404	.508	21	84	
2014	Andrew McCutchen (3)	Pittsburgh Pirates	.314	.410	.542	25	83	
2014	Giancarlo Stanton	Miami Marlins	.288	.395	.555	37	105	
2014	Justin Upton (2)	Atlanta Braves	.270	.342	.491	29	102	
2015	Carlos González (2)	Colorado Rockies	.271	.325	.540	40	97	
2015	Bryce Harper	Washington Nationals	.330	.460	.649	42	99	
2015	Andrew McCutchen (4)	Pittsburgh Pirates	.292	.401	.488	23	96	
2016	Charlie Blackmon	Colorado Rockies	.324	.381	.552	29	82	
2016	Yoenis Cespedes	New York Mets	.280	.354	.530	31	86	
2016	Christian Yelich	Miami Marlins	.298	.376	.483	21	98	
2017	Charlie Blackmon (2)	Colorado Rockies	.331	.399	.601	37	104	
2017	Marcell Ozuna	Miami Marlins	.312	.376	.548	37	124	
2017	Giancarlo Stanton (2)	Miami Marlins	.281	.376	.631	59	132	
2018	Nick Markakis	Atlanta Braves	.297	.366	.440	14	93	
2018	David Peralta	Arizona Diamondbacks	.293	.352	.516	30	87	
2018	Christian Yelich (2)	Milwaukee Brewers	.326	.402	.598	36	110	
2019	Ronald Acuña Jr.	Atlanta Braves	.280	.365	.518	41	101	
2019	Cody Bellinger	Los Angeles Dodgers	.305	.406	.629	47	115	
2019	Christian Yelich (3)	Milwaukee Brewers	.329	.429	.671	44	97	
2020	Ronald Acuña Jr. (2)	Atlanta Braves	.250	.406	.581	14	29	
2020	Mookie Betts (4)	Los Angeles Dodgers	.292	.366	.562	16	39	
2020	Juan Soto	Washington Nationals	.351	.490	.695	13	37	
2021	Nick Castellanos	Cincinnati Reds	.309	.362	.576	34	100	
2021	Bryce Harper (2)	Philadelphia Phillies	.309	.429	.615	35	84	
2021	Juan Soto (2)	Washington Nationals	.313	.465	.534	29	95	
2022	Mookie Betts (5)	Los Angeles Dodgers	.269	.340	.533	35	82	
2022	Kyle Schwarber	Philadelphia Phillies	.218	.323	.504	46	94	
2022	Juan Soto (3)	Washington Nationals; San Diego Padres	.242	.401	.452	27	62	
2023	Ronald Acuña Jr. (3)	Atlanta Braves	.337	.416	.596	41	106	
2023	Mookie Betts (6)	Los Angeles Dodgers	.307	.408	.579	39	107	
2023	Juan Soto (4)	San Diego Padres	.275	.410	.519	35	109	
2024	Teoscar Hernández (3)	Los Angeles Dodgers	.272	.339	.501	33	99	
2024	Jackson Merrill	San Diego Padres	.292	.326	.500	24	90	
2024	Jurickson Profar	San Diego Padres	.280	.380	.459	24	85	
2025	Corbin Carroll	Arizona Diamondbacks	.259	.343	.541	31	84	
2025	Juan Soto (6)	New York Mets	.263	.396	.525	43	105	
2025	Kyle Tucker (2)	Chicago Cubs	.266	.377	.464	22	73	
2026	Jackson Chourio	Milwaukee Brewers	.291	.351	.487	25	75	
2026	Pete Crow-Armstrong	Chicago Cubs	.280	.372	.570	45	107	
2026	James Wood	Washington Nationals	.265	.388	.503	30	77	
