= Chris Johnson (baseball) =

American baseball player and coach (born 1984)

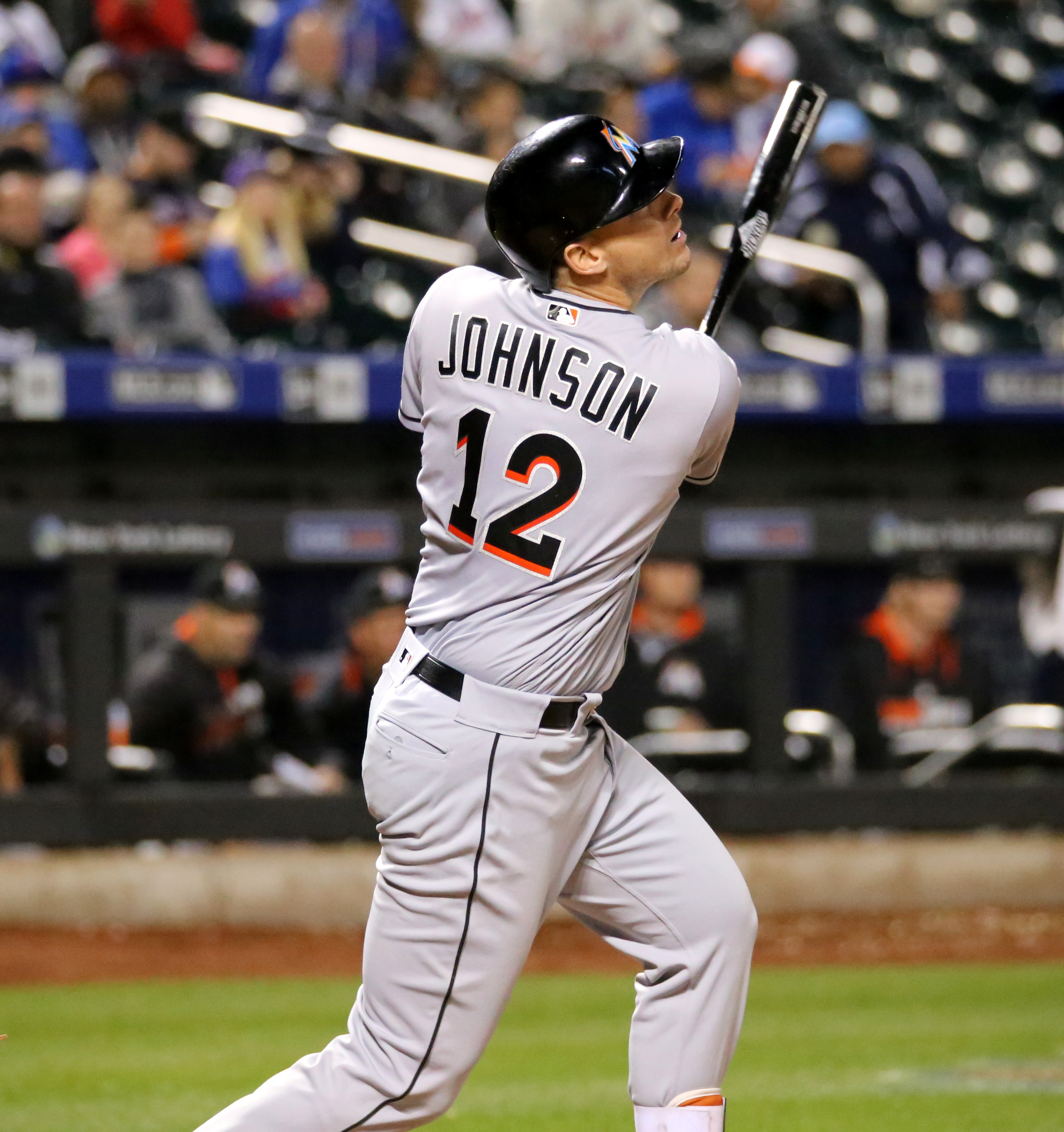
- Johnson with the Miami Marlins
- Third baseman / Assistant hitting coach
- Born: October 1, 1984 (age 41); Naples, Florida, U.S.
- Batted: Right Threw: Right

MLB debut
- September 9, 2009, for the Houston Astros

Last MLB appearance
- October 2, 2016, for the Miami Marlins

MLB statistics
- Batting average: .275
- Home runs: 63
- Runs batted in: 339
- Stats at Baseball Reference

Teams
- As player: Houston Astros (2009–2012); Arizona Diamondbacks (2012); Atlanta Braves (2013–2015); Cleveland Indians (2015); Miami Marlins (2016); As coach: Chicago White Sox (2023); Washington Nationals (2024–2025)

Christopher Dalton Johnson (born October 1, 1984) is an American professional baseball coach and former third baseman. He played in Major League Baseball (MLB) for the Houston Astros, Arizona Diamondbacks, Atlanta Braves, Cleveland Indians, and Miami Marlins. He most recently served as the assistant hitting coach for the Washington Nationals.

== Amateur career ==
Johnson was drafted in the 37th round by the Boston Red Sox in the 2003 Major League Baseball draft, but he opted for college. He attended Stetson University, where he led the Hatters to the 2005 and 2006 Atlantic Sun Tournament Championships. In 2005, he was named the A-Sun Freshman of the Year, and played collegiate summer baseball for the Hyannis Mets of the Cape Cod Baseball League. Johnson was drafted by the Houston Astros in the fourth round of the 2006 Major League Baseball draft.

== Professional career ==
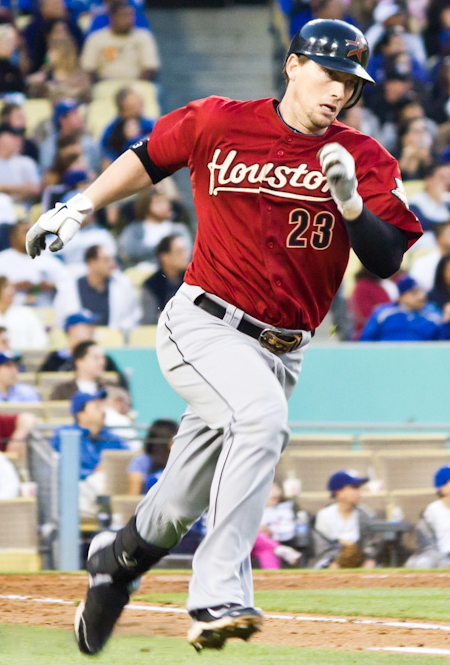
Johnson playing for the Houston Astros in 2011

=== Houston Astros ===
Johnson was called up to the majors for the first time on September 7, 2009 and made his major league debut two days later.

In the 2010 season, Johnson batted .308 with 105 hits, 22 doubles, 11 home runs, and 52 RBIs in just 341 at bats.

=== Arizona Diamondbacks ===
Johnson was traded to the Arizona Diamondbacks on July 29, 2012, for Bobby Borchering and Marc Krauss. In his first game as a Diamondback, Johnson hit a grand slam. He became the first Diamondback player to hit a grand slam in his first game with the club.

After qualifying as a Super Two, giving him an extra year of arbitration eligibility, Johnson signed a one-year, $2.2875 million deal with the Diamondbacks for the 2013 season.

=== Atlanta Braves ===
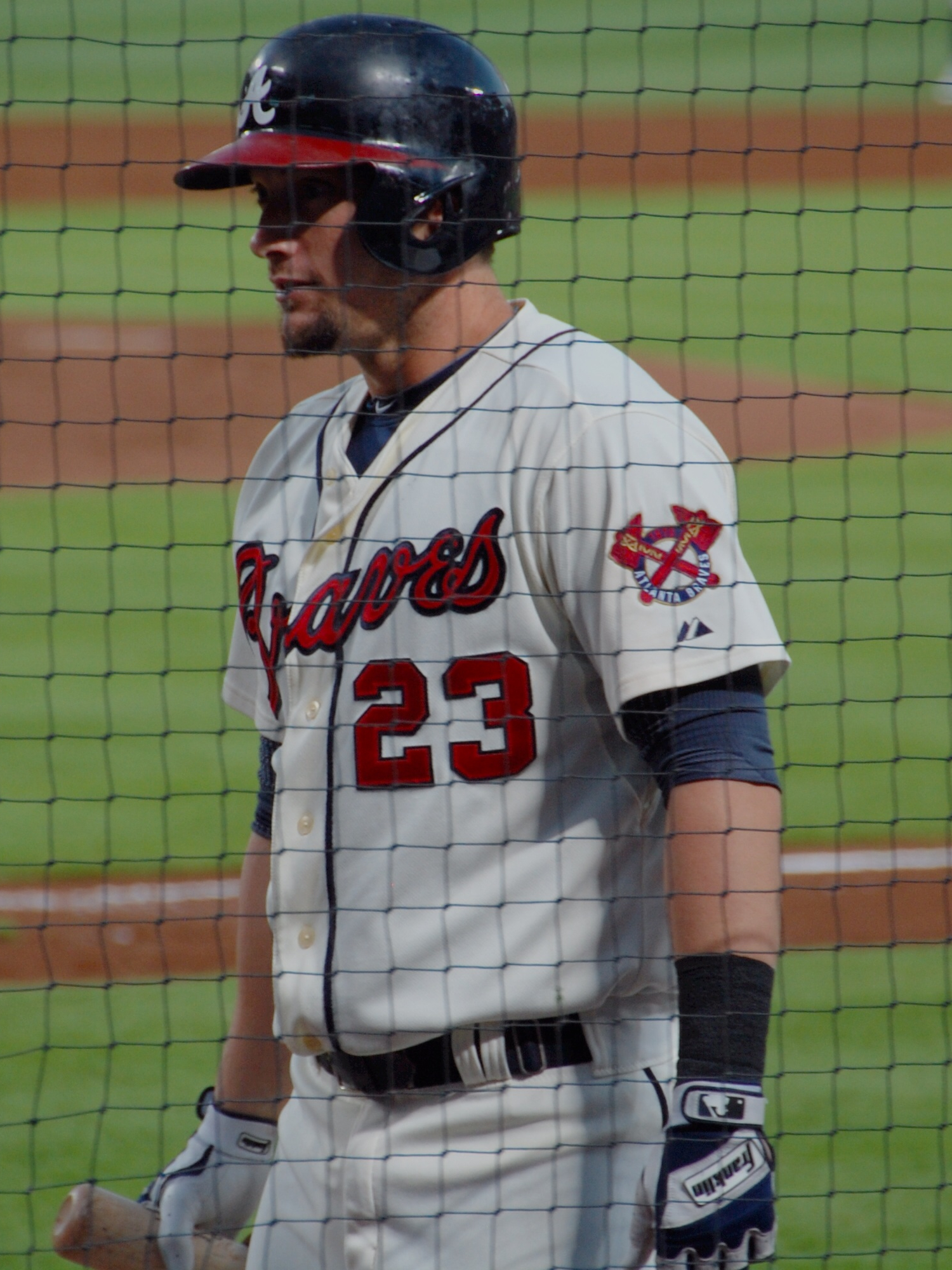
Johnson during his tenure with the Atlanta Braves in 2013

After the 2012 season, the Diamondbacks traded Johnson and Justin Upton to the Atlanta Braves in exchange for Martín Prado, Randall Delgado, Nick Ahmed, Zeke Spruill and Brandon Drury. He enjoyed a breakout season, hitting .321, with 12 home runs and 68 RBIs. In the NL batting race, Johnson finished second to Michael Cuddyer.

Johnson signed a three-year extension worth $23.5 million on May 2, 2014. The deal included a team option worth $10 million. He regressed in 2014, while attempting to hit for more power. Johnson set a career high in strikeouts, and his walk rate fell.

After continuing to decline in 2015, Johnson lost his starting role to Juan Uribe, who the Braves acquired from the Los Angeles Dodgers during the season. Johnson was pushed into a reserve role, often starting only against left handed pitchers. After Freddie Freeman suffered a wrist injury, Johnson occasionally started at first base, but still saw less playing time than in past seasons. Johnson expressed an interest in being traded at the trade deadline, in the hope of getting more playing time with another team. However, it was Uribe who was traded near the deadline. In addition, Freeman returned from the disabled list and Johnson was expected to regain his starting role at third base.

=== Cleveland Indians ===
On August 7, 2015, Johnson was traded to the Cleveland Indians in exchange for Nick Swisher, Michael Bourn, and cash considerations. Johnson appeared in 27 games with the Indians, batting .289 with four doubles, one home run, and seven RBIs.

On December 22, 2015, the Indians released him.

=== Miami Marlins ===
On January 13, 2016, Johnson signed a one-year contract with the Miami Marlins. In 113 games for the Marlins, Johnson batted .222/.281/.329 with five home runs and 24 RBI.

=== Baltimore Orioles ===
On February 13, 2017, Johnson signed a minor league contract with the Baltimore Orioles, that included an invitation to major league spring training. He was released on March 27 but re-signed a couple of days later. Johnson played in 69 games split between the Triple–A Norfolk Tides and the Low–A Aberdeen IronBirds, hitting .292/.330/.491 with 11 home runs and 37 RBI. He elected free agency following the season on November 6.

=== Chicago White Sox ===
On January 24, 2019, Johnson signed a minor league contract with the Chicago White Sox. He was released by the White Sox organization on March 20.

== Coaching career ==
=== Chicago White Sox ===
Johnson was hired as the hitting coach for the Charlotte Knights, the Triple-A affiliate of the Chicago White Sox, before the 2021 season.

On November 29, 2022, Johnson was named assistant hitting coach for the White Sox. This would be his first coaching position in the Major League level.

=== Washington Nationals ===
Johnson was named the assistant hitting coach for the Washington Nationals for the 2024 season. In August 2024, the Nationals renewed Johnson's contract for an additional season. He was let go following the 2025 season.

== Personal life ==
Johnson is the son of former MLB player and coach Ron Johnson.

== See also ==
- List of second-generation Major League Baseball players
