= Nick Ahmed =

American baseball player (born 1990)

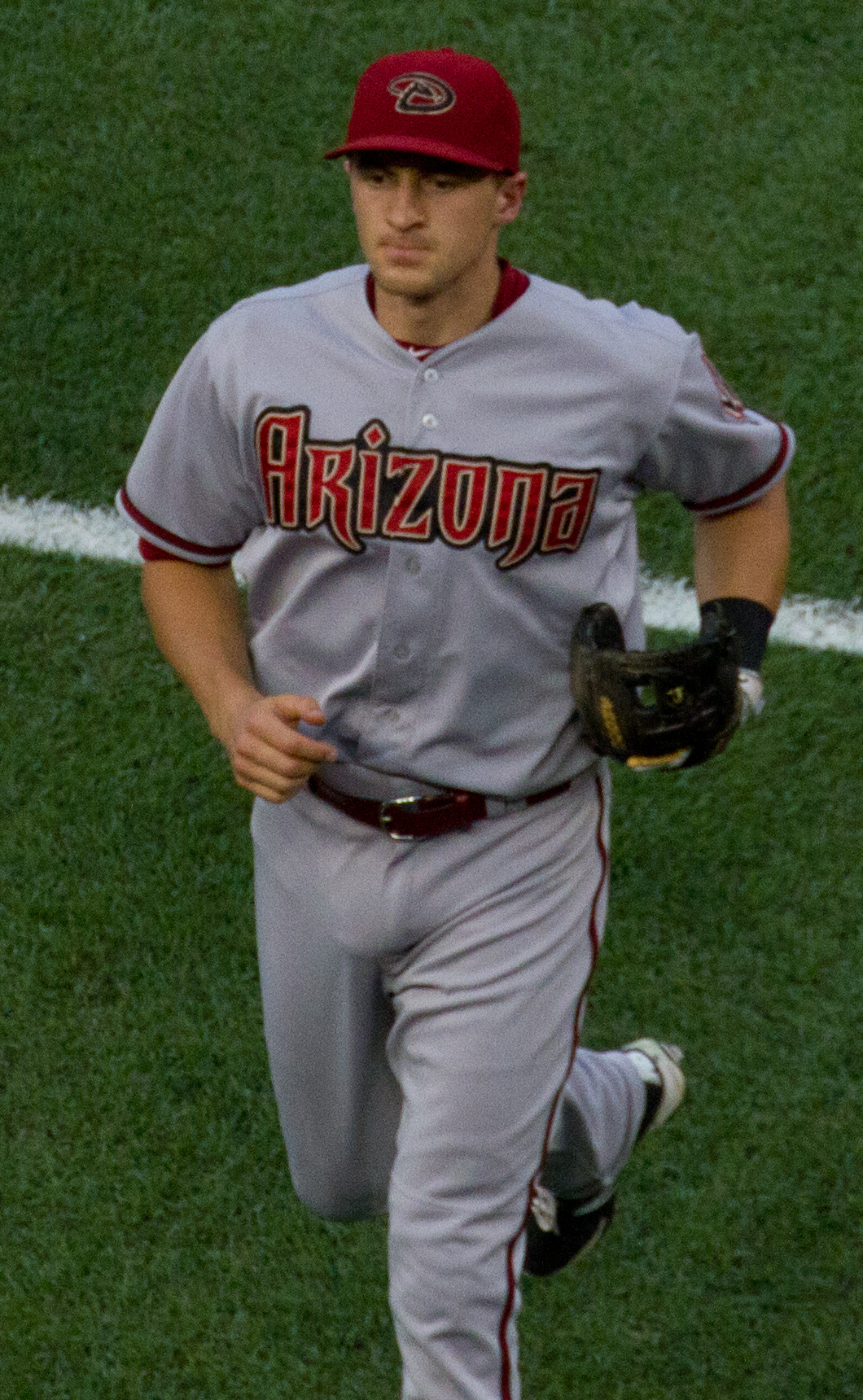
- Ahmed with the Arizona Diamondbacks in 2015
- Shortstop
- Born: March 15, 1990 (age 36); East Longmeadow, Massachusetts, U.S.
- Batted: Right Threw: Right

MLB debut
- June 29, 2014, for the Arizona Diamondbacks

Last MLB appearance
- May 1, 2025, for the Texas Rangers

MLB statistics
- Batting average: .233
- Home runs: 72
- Runs batted in: 339
- Stats at Baseball Reference

Teams
- Arizona Diamondbacks (2014–2023); San Francisco Giants (2024); Los Angeles Dodgers (2024); San Diego Padres (2024); Texas Rangers (2025)

Career highlights and awards
- 2× Gold Glove Award (2018, 2019)

Nicholas Mark Ahmed (born March 15, 1990) is an American former professional baseball shortstop. He played in Major League Baseball (MLB) for the Arizona Diamondbacks, San Francisco Giants, Los Angeles Dodgers, San Diego Padres, and Texas Rangers. He won the Gold Glove Award twice, in 2018 and 2019.

== Early life ==
Nicholas Mark Ahmed was born on March 15, 1990, in East Longmeadow, Massachusetts. Ahmed attended East Longmeadow High School in East Longmeadow, Massachusetts, where he played as a pitcher (posting a career record of 21–3), was a member of the National Honor Society, and also played basketball.

== College career ==
He then enrolled at the University of Connecticut, where he majored in sport management and played shortstop and pitcher for the Connecticut Huskies baseball team. As a freshman, he batted .288 and .300 as a sophomore, and played for the Bourne Braves of the Cape Cod Baseball League during the summer of his 2010 sophomore year. As a junior, Ahmed hit .326.

== Professional career ==
=== Atlanta Braves (2011–2012) ===
==== Minor leagues ====
The Atlanta Braves drafted Ahmed in the second round, with the 85th overall selection, of the 2011 Major League Baseball draft. He spent his first professional season with the rookie–level Danville Braves, hitting .262 across 59 games. Ahmed played in 130 games for the High–A Lynchburg Hillcats in 2012, batting .269/.337/.391 with six home runs, 49 RBI, and 40 stolen bases. He was named the fastest baserunner in minor league baseball by Baseball America.

=== Arizona Diamondbacks (2013–2023) ===
On January 24, 2013, the Braves traded Ahmed, Martín Prado, Randall Delgado, Zeke Spruill, and Brandon Drury to the Arizona Diamondbacks in exchange for Justin Upton and Chris Johnson. He spent the entirety of the season with the Double–A Mobile BayBears, hitting .236/.288/.324 with four home runs, 46 RBI, and 26 stolen bases across 136 contests.

Ahmed began the 2014 season with the Triple–A Reno Aces, where he hit .312 in 104 games.

==== Major leagues ====
Ahmed was selected to the 40-man roster and promoted to the Major Leagues for the first time on June 29, 2014. He collected his first Major League hit off of Odrisamer Despaigne of the San Diego Padres in his debut that same day and his first major league homer on July 31 off Stolmy Pimentel of the Pittsburgh Pirates. In 25 games, he hit an even .200 in 70 at bats.

Ahmed began the 2015 season as the Diamondbacks' starting shortstop. In 134 games, he hit .226 with nine home runs. Ahmed's 2016 season was cut short due to a right hip impingement, causing him to miss the last two months of the season. In 90 games, he had a .218 batting average. On June 27, 2017, his right hand was broken by a fastball, leading to a long layoff, and two months later his right wrist was fractured when he was hit by a pitch in a rehab appearance. As a result, he only appeared in 53 games during the 2017 season with a .251 batting average.

Ahmed entered the 2018 season fully healthy and went on to finish the season with career bests offensively. In 153 games, Ahmed hit .234 with 16 home runs, 70 RBI and 33 doubles. He also had his best defensive season, leading National League shortstops with 21 defensive runs saved en route to his first career Gold Glove Award. The following season, Ahmed continued his offensive resurgence from 2018, hitting a career high .254 along with career highs in home runs (19) and RBI (82) while also netting his second straight Gold Glove Award.

Before the 2020 season, Ahmed signed a four-year contract with the Diamondbacks that guaranteed him $32.5 million. In the pandemic-shortened 2020 season, Ahmed hit .266 with five home runs and 29 RBI in 57 games. He appeared in 129 games for the Diamondbacks in 2021, posting a slash of .221/.280/.339 with five home runs, 38 RBI, and seven stolen bases. Ahmed played in 17 games for Arizona in 2022, slashing .231/.259/.442 with three home runs and seven RBI. His season was cut short when he was placed on the 60-day injured list with right shoulder inflammation on June 8.

In 2023, Ahmed became the first player in Diamondbacks history to play 10 seasons with the club. In 72 games for Arizona, he batted .212/.257/.303 with two home runs, 17 RBI, and five stolen bases. On September 6, due to his declining production and injury history, he was designated for assignment to make room for top prospect Jordan Lawlar. He was released by the Diamondbacks on September 9.

=== San Francisco Giants (2024) ===
On February 26, 2024, Ahmed signed a minor league contract with the San Francisco Giants. On March 28, he had his contract selected after beating out Marco Luciano for the starting shortstop position in spring training. In 52 games for the Giants, he batted .232/.278/.303 with one home run and 15 RBI. Ahmed was designated for assignment by San Francisco on July 9 and released the following day.

=== Los Angeles Dodgers (2024) ===
On July 24, 2024, Ahmed signed a major league contract with the Los Angeles Dodgers, as a replacement for injured shortstop Miguel Rojas in the lineup. In 17 games for Los Angeles, he hit .229 with one home run and two RBI. The Dodgers designated him for assignment on August 19. He cleared waivers, and elected free agency in lieu of an outright assignment on August 22.

=== San Diego Padres (2024) ===
On September 1, 2024, Ahmed signed a minor league contract with the San Diego Padres. On September 22, the Padres selected Ahmed's contract, adding him to their active roster. In 2 games for the team, he went 1-for-7 (.143).

=== Texas Rangers (2025) ===
On February 4, 2025, Ahmed signed a minor league contract with the Texas Rangers. He was released by the Rangers prior to the start of the season on March 22. On April 9, Ahmed re-signed with the Rangers organization on a new minor league contract. On April 23, Texas selected Ahmed's contract, adding him to their active roster. In five games for the Rangers, he went 0-for-9 with one stolen base and one walk. Ahmed was designated for assignment following the promotion of Blaine Crim on May 2. He cleared waivers and elected free agency on May 4.

Ahmed announced his retirement from professional baseball on July 24, 2025.

== Personal life ==
Ahmed is married to Amanda (Coughlin) Ahmed. They have two sons and a daughter. Ahmed is a Christian.

Ahmed has a younger brother, Michael, who played college baseball for the Holy Cross Crusaders and was selected in the 20th round (604th overall) of the 2013 Major League Baseball draft by the Los Angeles Dodgers. His uncle, Raphael Cerrato, is the head baseball coach at the University of Rhode Island.

== See also ==
- Arizona Diamondbacks award winners and league leaders
