= Zeke Spruill =

American baseball player (born 1989)

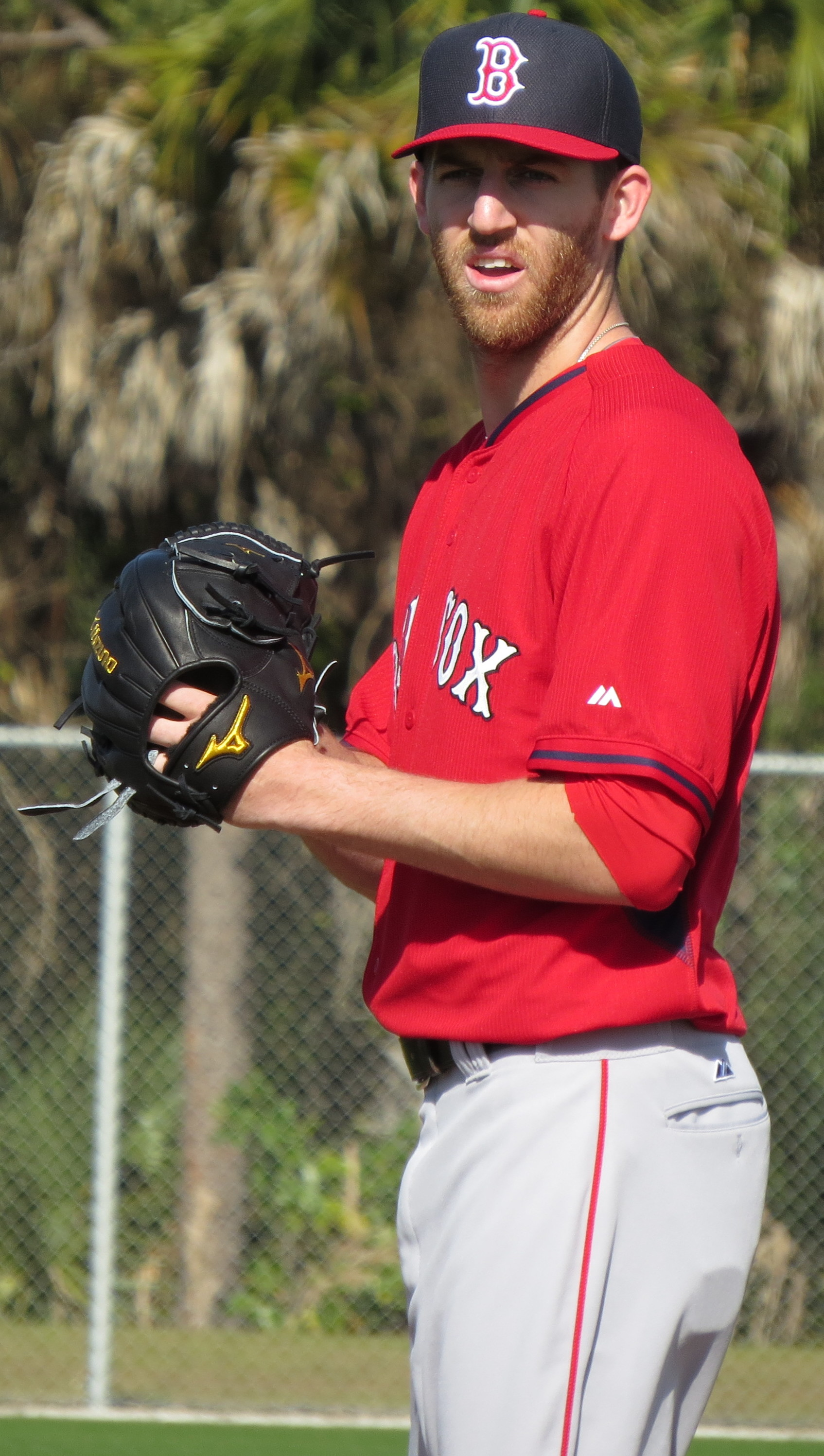
- Pitcher
- Born: September 11, 1989 (age 36); Chesapeake, Virginia, U.S.
- Batted: Right Threw: Right

Professional debut
- MLB: June 21, 2013, for the Arizona Diamondbacks
- KBO: April 1, 2016, for the Kia Tigers
- CPBL: March 28, 2017, for the Lamigo Monkeys

Last appearance
- MLB: September 23, 2014, for the Arizona Diamondbacks
- KBO: October 5, 2016, for the Kia Tigers
- CPBL: May 19, 2019, for the Lamigo Monkeys

MLB statistics
- Win–loss record: 1–3
- Earned run average: 4.24
- Strikeouts: 23

KBO statistics
- Win–loss record: 10–13
- Earned run average: 5.27
- Strikeouts: 125

CPBL statistics
- Win–loss record: 22–6
- Earned run average: 3.74
- Strikeouts: 227
- Stats at Baseball Reference

Teams
- Arizona Diamondbacks (2013–2014); Kia Tigers (2016); Lamigo Monkeys (2017–2019)

Career highlights and awards
- 2x Taiwan Series champion (2017, 2018)
Medals
Men's baseball
Representing United States
WBSC Premier12
Silver medal – second place	2015 Tokyo	Team

Ezekiel Stephen Spruill (born September 11, 1989) is an American former professional baseball pitcher. He played in Major League Baseball (MLB) for the Arizona Diamondbacks, in the KBO League for the Kia Tigers, and in the Chinese Professional Baseball League (CPBL) for the Lamigo Monkeys.

== Career ==
=== Atlanta Braves ===
Spruill was drafted by the Atlanta Braves in the 2nd round, 70th overall, in the 2008 Major League Baseball draft. He made his professional debut with the GCL Braves. Spruill spent the 2008–2012 seasons in the Braves minor league system, reaching as high as Double-A with the Mississippi Braves. The Braves added Spruill to the team's 40-man roster on November 20, 2012.

=== Arizona Diamondbacks ===
After the 2012 season, the Braves traded Spruill, Nick Ahmed, Martín Prado, Randall Delgado, and Brandon Drury to the Diamondbacks for Justin Upton and Chris Johnson.

Spruill made his MLB debut on June 21, 2013, against the Cincinnati Reds at Chase Field. He pitched one inning in relief, giving up one hit, no runs, and picked up his first career strikeout.

In August, Spruill made 2 starts, pitching a combined 7 innings while allowing 10 runs; in both starts he received the loss.

=== Boston Red Sox ===
On December 12, 2014, he was traded to the Boston Red Sox in exchange for Myles Smith. He was designated for assignment on July 3, 2015, to create room for Noe Ramirez on the 40 man roster.

=== Kia Tigers ===
On December 2, 2015, Spruill signed a one-year, $700,000 deal with the Kia Tigers of the KBO. In 2016 with Kia, Spruill registered a 5.27 ERA and 10–13 record with 125 strikeouts in 30 appearances.

=== Lamigo Monkeys ===
On February 15, 2017, Spruill signed with the Lamigo Monkeys of the CPBL. On June 18, 2017, Spruill threw a no-hitter against the Fubon Guardians. However, the game was not scored as a no-hitter because the game was called in the 7th inning due to rain.

=== Texas Rangers ===
On December 14, 2017, Spruill signed a minor league contract with the Texas Rangers. He was released in March 2018 without making any official spring training appearances.

=== Return to Lamigo Monkeys ===
On April 10, 2018, Spruill signed with the Lamigo Monkeys as the team's foreign backup pitcher. He will pitch for the club's farm team and can only be promoted if one of the three other foreign pitchers on the active roster is released. On May 27, 2018, Spruill was called up to the Monkeys following the release of Darin Downs. Spruill later re-signed with the Monkeys for the 2019 season. He was later released on May 20, 2019.
