= Justin Upton =

American baseball player (born 1987)

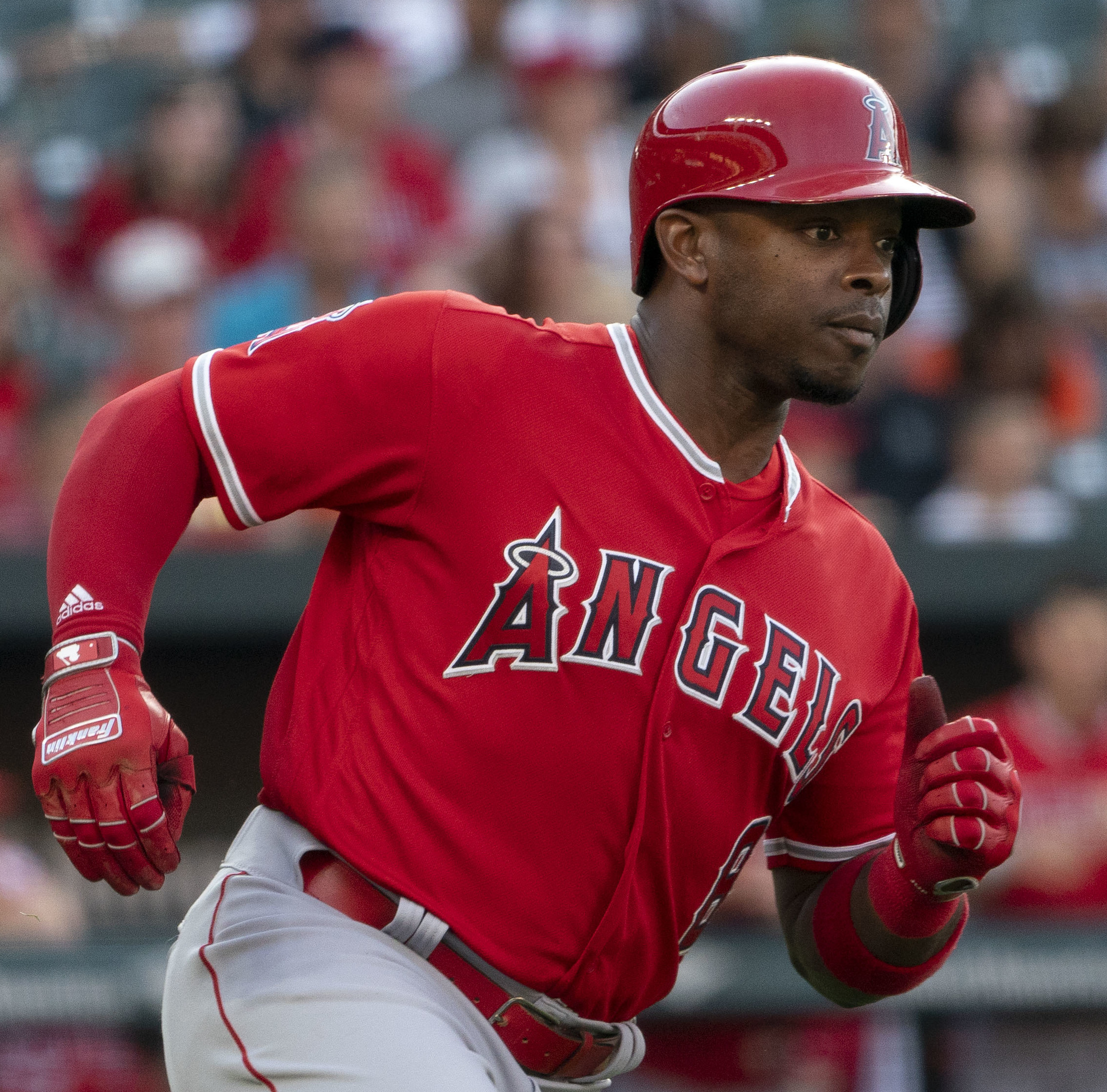
- Upton with the Los Angeles Angels in 2018
- Outfielder
- Born: August 25, 1987 (age 39); Norfolk, Virginia, U.S.
- Batted: Right Threw: Right

MLB debut
- August 2, 2007, for the Arizona Diamondbacks

Last MLB appearance
- July 15, 2022, for the Seattle Mariners

MLB statistics
- Batting average: .261
- Home runs: 325
- Runs batted in: 1,003
- Stats at Baseball Reference

Teams
- Arizona Diamondbacks (2007–2012); Atlanta Braves (2013–2014); San Diego Padres (2015); Detroit Tigers (2016–2017); Los Angeles Angels (2017–2021); Seattle Mariners (2022)

Career highlights and awards
- 4× All-Star (2009, 2011, 2015, 2017); 3× Silver Slugger Award (2011, 2014, 2017)

Justin Irvin Upton (born August 25, 1987) is an American former professional baseball outfielder. Nicknamed "J-Up", he played in Major League Baseball (MLB) for the Arizona Diamondbacks, Atlanta Braves, San Diego Padres, Detroit Tigers, Los Angeles Angels, and Seattle Mariners. He was a teammate of his brother B. J. Upton with both the Braves and the Padres. While primarily a right fielder throughout his career, Upton later transitioned to left field with the Braves, Padres and Tigers.

Upton was selected first overall by the Diamondbacks in the 2005 MLB draft out of high school and made his MLB debut with them in 2007. He has been selected to four All-Star teams and has won three Silver Slugger Awards. Justin and B.J. are the only brothers in MLB history to ever be selected with the first and second picks of the first round of any draft.

== Early life and amateur career ==
Upton was born to Melvin and Yvonne (née Gordon) Upton. Yvonne worked as a teacher and Melvin worked variously as a scout for the Kansas City Royals, a mortgage broker and a college basketball referee in the Mid-Eastern Athletic Conference after playing both college football and basketball at Norfolk State.

Upton played baseball with his brother, B.J., who is three years older. The Upton brothers competed on travel teams with Mark Reynolds, David Wright, and Ryan Zimmerman. Upton played against Cameron Maybin in Amateur Athletic Union play.

Upton was an all-district shortstop for Great Bridge High School in Chesapeake, Virginia, and won the AFLAC National High School Player of the Year Award. Baseball America ranked him the best high school baseball prospect. He verbally committed to play college baseball at NC State.

== Professional career ==
=== Arizona Diamondbacks ===
==== Minor leagues ====
The Arizona Diamondbacks selected Upton with the first overall selection in the 2005 MLB draft. He signed with the Diamondbacks for a $6.1 million signing bonus.

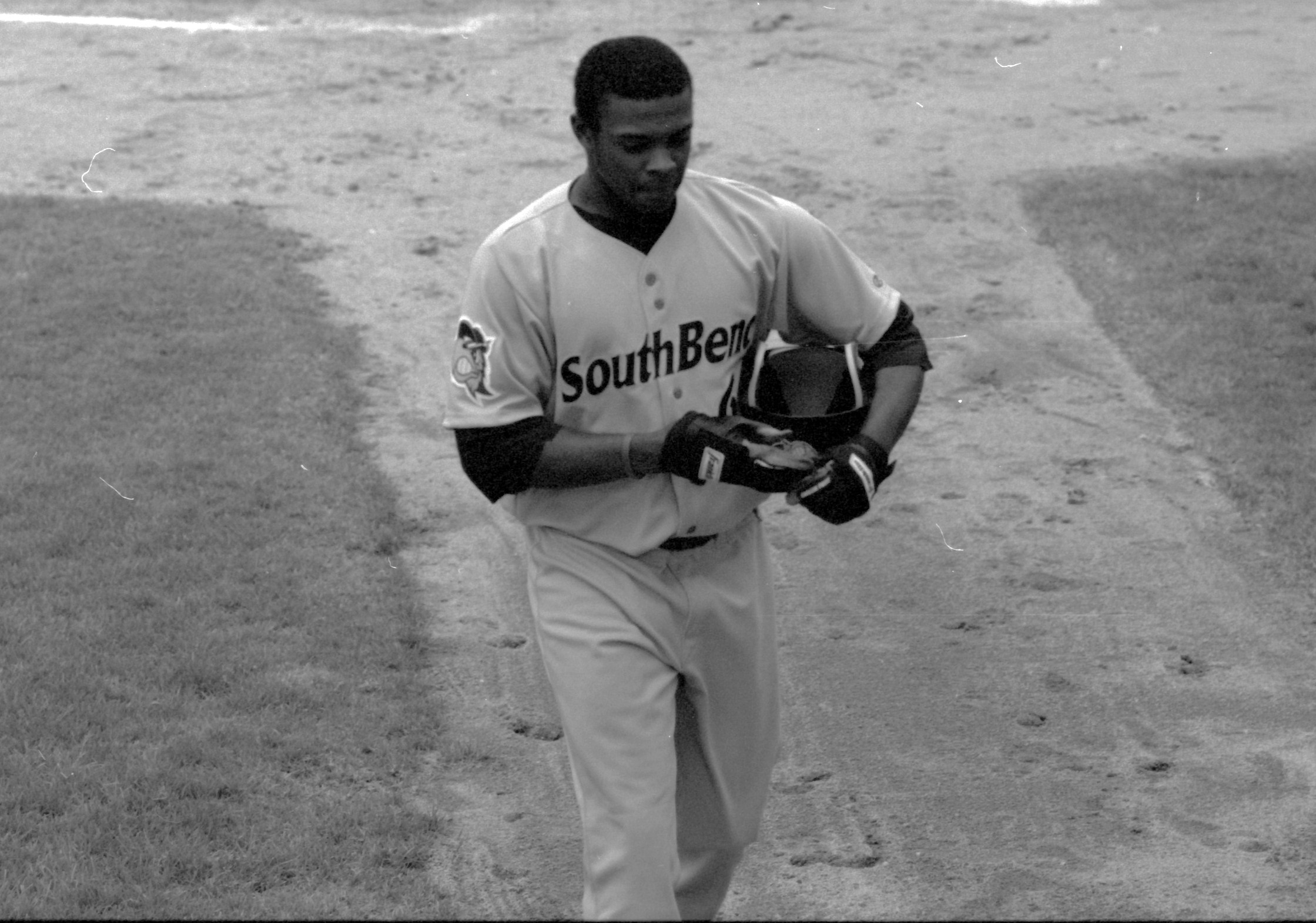
Justin Upton with the South Bend Silver Hawks in 2006.

In his first professional season, Upton played for the Class-A South Bend Silver Hawks. He began 2007 with the Class-A Advanced Visalia Oaks, but was promoted to the Class AA Mobile BayBears after hitting .341 with five home runs for the Oaks in April.

==== 2007 ====
On August 2, 2007, Upton was called up to the big league team at the age of only 19, following an injury to everyday right fielder Carlos Quentin. When he was called up, the Diamondbacks had star rookie Chris Young at center field, so Upton shifted to right.

Upton recorded his first career major league hit and run scored on August 4, 2007, in his third major league game. His first career RBI came the next day, and his first career home run two days after that. He almost became the youngest player ever to hit for the cycle on that day, falling just a single shy of the milestone.

He finished his rookie campaign with 2 home runs, 11 RBIs, 2 stolen bases, and a .221 batting average. Despite a relatively disappointing start to his career (albeit with limited playing time), he broke out in the 2007 post-season, leading the Diamondbacks to a three-game sweep of the Chicago Cubs, making it to the NLCS. He finished the 2007 post-season with an impressive .357 batting average, a double, a triple, a stolen base, and an RBI to go along with an impressive .571 slugging percentage.

==== 2008 ====
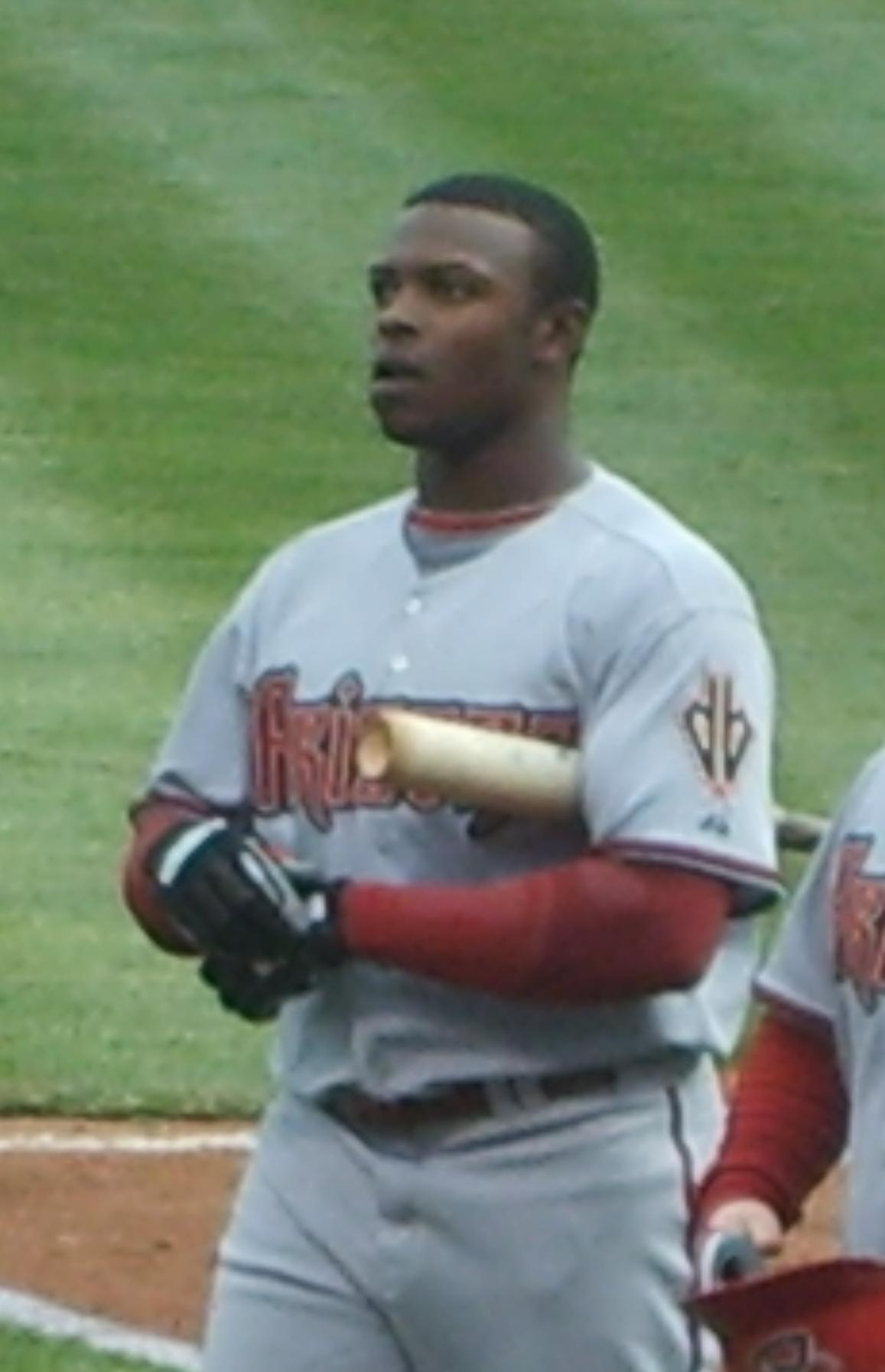
Upton with the Arizona Diamondbacks in 2008

In 2008 spring training, Upton hit over .300 with three home runs, 12 RBIs, and four stolen bases, earning the starting right field job over Jeff Salazar. Manager Bob Melvin said that Upton has a "very high ceiling," and that it "wouldn't surprise him" if he had a great 2008 season.

Upton began the season and held the current title of being the youngest active major leaguer second to Clayton Kershaw as of July 31, 2008. Upton collected his first big hit of the 2008 major league season on April 3. In the sixth inning of a game against the Cincinnati Reds, he broke up a no-hitter in the major league debut of Johnny Cueto with a home run. It was Arizona's only hit of the contest. The next night (April 4), he went 3 for 5 against the Colorado Rockies in their home opener with his second home run of the season. For the third consecutive ballgame on April 5, Upton homered while collecting three hits in a 7–2 Arizona victory. His third home run made him only the third player ever under the age of 21 to hit home runs in three straight games. On April 11, Upton homered off Jeff Francis of Colorado for his fourth home run of 2008 campaign. The home run was in an 8–2 victory that was the seventh straight for Arizona. The very next day (April 12), he and Arizona continued their streaks, with Upton going 3 for 3, hitting a three-run home run to dead center field at Chase Field and the Diamondbacks winning 10–3, marking their eighth straight win. Upton had a career-high four RBIs on the day.

Upton went through a prolonged slump in the month of May that saw him go 0-for-24 with 17 strikeouts at one point. Upton came out of his slump on May 30 with a home run against the Giants.

On July 6, 2008, Upton hit a 484-foot (148 m) shot off San Diego Padres' pitcher Josh Banks. It was at that point the second-longest home run in the history of Chase Field. The only longer home run was a 503 ft (153 m) shot off the bat of Richie Sexson.

Despite getting off to a hot start on the year, cold streaks and a left oblique injury (which resulted in a five-week stint on the DL) ruined chances of Upton putting together a great year. However, he finished the year with respectable numbers for a 20-year-old, finishing the year with 15 home runs, 42 RBIs, 6 triples, 19 doubles, a stolen base, and a .463 slugging percentage to go along with a .250 batting average. On defense, he tied for the lead among all major league outfielders in errors, with 11.

==== 2009 ====
Upton finished April 2009 with a .250 batting average with two home runs and eight RBIs. In May, Upton had seven home runs, 21 RBIs, 8 doubles, 4 triples, a league-leading .709 slugging percentage, to go along with a .373 batting average and a .444 on-base percentage. On June 2, 2009, Upton was named NL Player of the Month of May. His brother Melvin Upton, Jr. earned AL Player of the Month of June, making Justin and B.J. the first pair of brothers to win player of the month honors in the same year. On July 5, Upton was named to the 2009 All-Star team as a reserve outfielder for the National League.

On August 5, 2009, against the Pittsburgh Pirates, Upton strained his right oblique trying to steal second base, resulting in a stint on the disabled list. Rookie outfielder Trent Oeltjen had taken over his spot on the roster.

Upton led the Diamondbacks in batting average (.300) and hits (158) to go along with 26 home runs (including his first career grand slam on 6/2/09 against the Dodgers) and 86 RBI. He's also thirteenth in the NL in slugging percentage (.532, third among outfielders) and has compiled 20 stolen bases to go along with 7 triples and 30 doubles. In 2009, he led all major league outfielders in errors, with 12, and had the lowest fielding percentage among them (.961). Despite this, Justin Upton posted a 7.4 UZR.

==== 2010 ====
On March 3, 2010, Upton agreed to a six-year, $50 million extension with a $1.25 million signing bonus, as well as a limited no-trade clause.

Upton's season was cut short for the second straight season by a strained right oblique, but he still finished the season with a respectable .273 batting average, 17 home runs, and 69 runs driven in to go along with 18 stolen bases.

==== 2011 ====
Upton was selected to be an all-star in his hometown stadium for the second time in his career, along with his teammate, Miguel Montero.

In 2011, Upton batted .289 with 31 home runs, but on defense he led all major league outfielders in errors, with 13. He also led the NL in being hit by the pitch, with 19 (a Diamondbacks record), and was second in the league in doubles (39) and third in runs scored (105) and extra base hits (75). He won a Fielding Bible Award in 2011 as the best fielding right fielder in MLB.

Through 2011, Upton was 2nd all-time of Diamondback hitters in HBP (30), 3rd in slugging percentage (.487) and OPS (.845), 4th in OBP (.357) and strikeouts (573), and 5th in triples (24). He was awarded one of the three National League OF Silver Slugger awards.

He came in fourth in the voting for the 2011 National League Most Valuable Player Award, behind winner Ryan Braun, Matt Kemp, and Prince Fielder.

==== 2012 ====
On August 3, 2012, Justin Upton hit his 100th career home run against the Philadelphia Phillies. His brother, B.J. would hit his 100th career home run thirty minutes later in another ballgame. Upton ended the 2012 season tied for 2nd in the National League in runs scored (107; behind Ryan Braun).

After the 2012 season, Upton rejected a trade to the Seattle Mariners.

=== Atlanta Braves ===
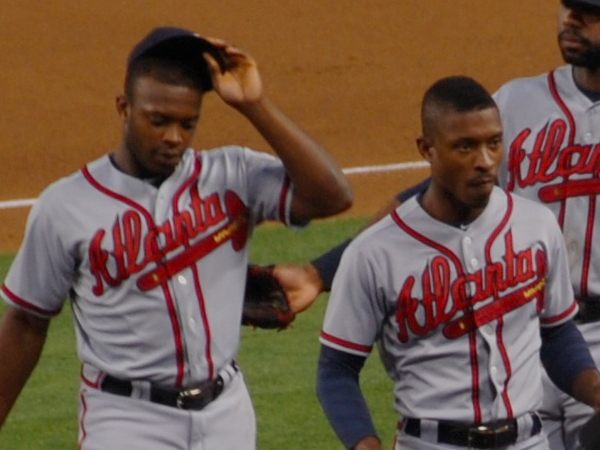
Justin (left) and Melvin Upton Jr. in 2013

On January 20, 2013, the Arizona Diamondbacks traded Upton and Chris Johnson to the Atlanta Braves in exchange for Martín Prado, Randall Delgado, shortstop prospect Nick Ahmed, pitching prospect Zeke Spruill, and minor league first baseman Brandon Drury. The trade allowed Upton to play with his brother Melvin, who had signed with Atlanta earlier in the offseason. The first time Melvin and Justin homered in the same game was April 6, 2013, when Melvin hit a game-tying home run off Carlos Marmol in the 9th inning and Justin Upton hit a game-winning home run (also off Marmol in the 9th inning) to lead the Braves a 6–5 victory over the Cubs. The Upton brothers hit back to back home runs on April 23, 2013, against the Colorado Rockies, marking the first time that brothers hit back to back home runs since 1938.

On August 8, 2014, Justin and Melvin homered in the same game for the fifth time, setting a new Major League record for brothers. The Uptons previously shared the record of four with two pairs of brothers: Vladimir and Wilton Guerrero, and Jason and Jeremy Giambi.

=== San Diego Padres ===
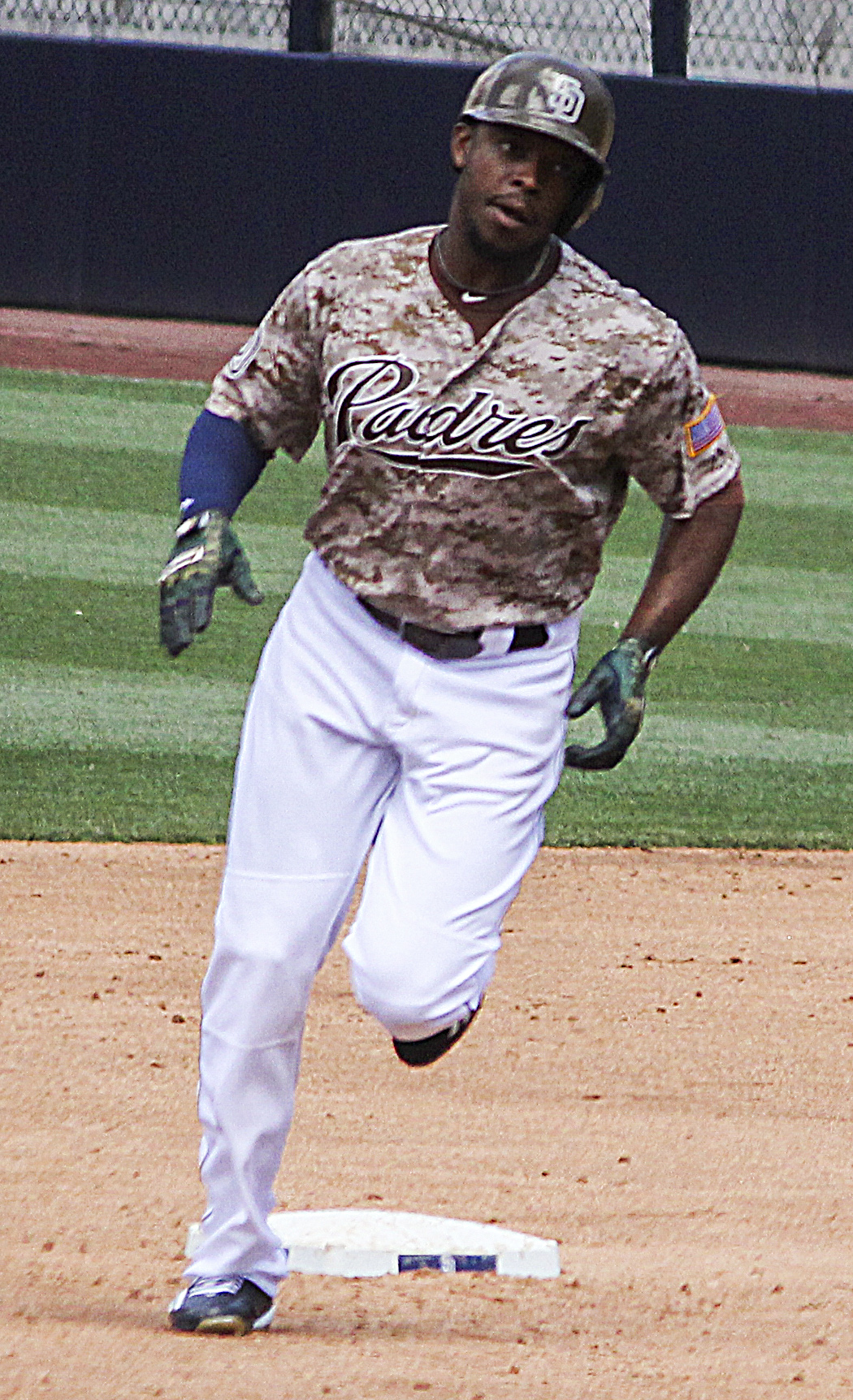
Upton playing for the San Diego Padres in 2015

On December 19, 2014, the Braves traded Upton and Aaron Northcraft to the San Diego Padres in exchange for Max Fried, Jace Peterson, Dustin Peterson, and Mallex Smith.

On July 6, 2015, Upton was selected as an All Star for the third time in his career, and his first selection since 2011. On October 23, 2015, Upton, along with Starling Marte and Christian Yelich, was selected as a Gold Glove finalist in left field. In his only season for the Padres, Upton hit .251 with 26 home runs and 81 RBI. He filed for free agency on November 2, 2015.

=== Detroit Tigers ===
On January 20, 2016, the Detroit Tigers signed Upton to a six-year, $132.75 million contract. The contract included an option for Upton to pursue free agency again after the 2017 season. Upton hit his 200th career home run on July 18, 2016, off Minnesota Twins starter Ricky Nolasco, accounting for the only run in a 1–0 Tigers victory.

Upton was named co-American League Player of the Week for the week of September 19–25 (sharing the honor with Carlos Santana of the Cleveland Indians). Upton was 10-for-25 (.400) with three doubles, three home runs, six RBIs, and an AL-leading 22 total bases. It was his first Player of the Week award in the American League and fourth overall, having last won the NL award on April 13, 2014, with the Atlanta Braves. For the 2016 season, Upton hit .246 with 31 home runs and 87 RBIs. Eighteen of Upton's home runs and 41 of his RBIs came in the last six weeks of the season.

Upton was a late addition to the 2017 American League All-Star roster. His addition was announced after it was determined that starting pitcher Michael Fulmer, the only Tiger player initially selected to the team, could not participate in the game due to the scheduling of his starts. At the time of his selection, Upton was hitting .271 with 21 doubles, 15 home runs, 54 RBIs, a .356 on-base percentage, and a .384 batting average with runners in scoring position (ranking third in the AL). This was Upton's fourth career All-Star selection, and his first in the American League. In an August 4 game against the Baltimore Orioles, Upton hit his third grand slam of the season.

=== Los Angeles Angels ===
On August 31, 2017, the Tigers traded Upton and cash to the Los Angeles Angels for Grayson Long and a player to be named later (PTBNL) or cash. On September 15, the trade was completed with the Tigers acquiring Angels pitching prospect Elvin Rodríguez as the PTBNL. Upton finished 2017 with a .273 batting average and .361 on-base percentage, while setting career highs with 44 doubles, 35 home runs, 109 RBI, and a .901 OPS. He also scored 100 runs for the third time in his career.

Upton was named a 2017 Gold Glove finalist in left field, along with Brett Gardner of the Yankees and Alex Gordon of the Royals. On November 2, Upton agreed to re-sign with the Angels to a 5-year, $106 million contract. Upton was named the AL Silver Slugger Award recipient in left field. This was Upton's third career Silver Slugger Award.

In 2018, Upton batted .257/.344/.463 while slugging 30 home runs and driving in 85 runs. On March 24, 2019, during a preseason game against the Los Angeles Dodgers, Upton suffered a turf toe injury. Upton's season debut was delayed to June 21. On September 13, Upton was diagnosed with patellar tendinitis, ending his 2019 season early. Upton finished the season batting .215/.309/.416 with 12 home runs and 40 RBIs, playing in just 63 games with a total of 256 plate appearances.

Upton hit his 300th career home run on July 29, 2020, in a game against the Seattle Mariners. He finished the pandemic-shortened season hitting .204/.289/.422 with nine home runs and 22 RBIs in 42 games. On August 27, 2021, against the San Diego Padres, Upton hit a sacrifice fly for his 1,000th career RBI. On September 5, Upton was placed on the 10-day injured list with a right lumbar strain. It was his second stint on the injured list this season, both times due to lower back issues.

Upton was designated for assignment by the Angels on April 2, 2022. In five years with Los Angeles, Upton had a .232 batting average, 75 home runs, and 203 RBIs. He cleared waivers and was released on April 8.

=== Seattle Mariners ===
On May 21, 2022, Upton signed a major league contract with the Seattle Mariners. He was recalled and made his Mariner debut on June 17. In 17 games for Seattle, he went 6–for–48 (.125) with one home run and three RBI. On July 22, the Mariners optioned Upton to the Triple–A Tacoma Rainiers, but he refused the assignment and elected free agency.

== Awards ==
- 2007: USA Today Minor League Player of the Year Award
- 2009: Player of the Month – National League, May
- 2011: NL Silver Slugger Award – outfield
- 2013: Player of the Month – National League, April
- 2014: NL Silver Slugger Award – outfield
- 2017: AL Silver Slugger Award – outfield

== Personal life ==
Upton and his wife, Ashley, have two daughters. Their second daughter has Emanuel syndrome; the couple has been active in spreading awareness about the disorder. They reside in Newport Beach, California.

== See also ==
- Arizona Diamondbacks award winners and league leaders
- Atlanta Braves award winners and league leaders
- Detroit Tigers award winners and league leaders
- Los Angeles Angels award winners and league leaders
- List of first overall Major League Baseball draft picks
- List of Major League Baseball career fielding errors leaders
- List of Major League Baseball career games played as a left fielder leaders
- List of Major League Baseball career games played as an outfielder leaders
- List of Major League Baseball career home run leaders
- List of Major League Baseball career putouts leaders
- List of Major League Baseball career runs batted in leaders
- List of Major League Baseball career runs scored leaders
- List of Major League Baseball career strikeouts by batters leaders
