= Martín Prado =

Venezuelan baseball player (born 1983)

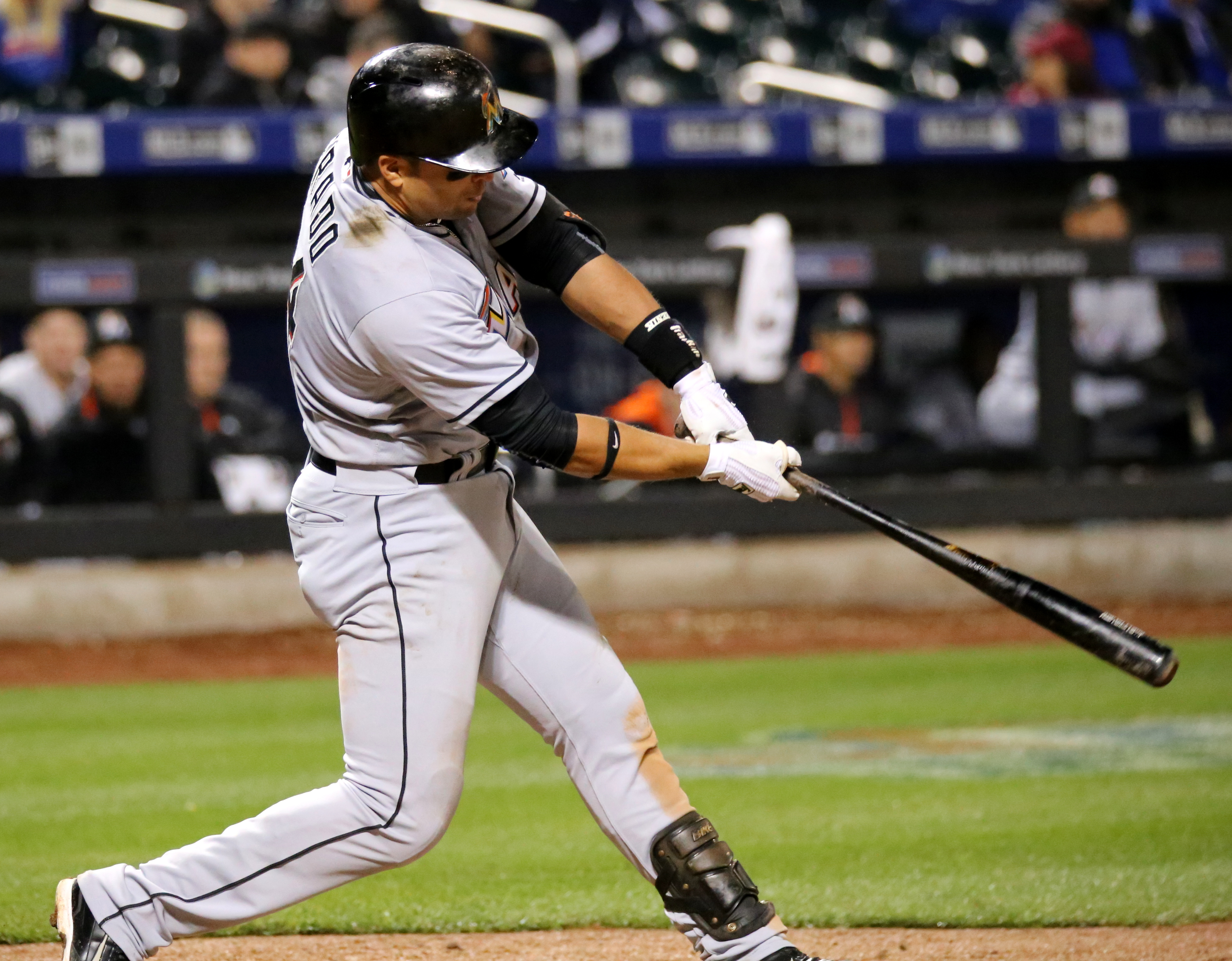
- Prado with the Miami Marlins in 2016
- Third baseman / Second baseman / Left fielder
- Born: October 27, 1983 (age 42); Maracay, Venezuela
- Batted: Right Threw: Right

MLB debut
- April 23, 2006, for the Atlanta Braves

Last MLB appearance
- September 29, 2019, for the Miami Marlins

MLB statistics
- Batting average: .287
- Home runs: 100
- Runs batted in: 609
- Stats at Baseball Reference

Teams
- Atlanta Braves (2006–2012); Arizona Diamondbacks (2013–2014); New York Yankees (2014); Miami Marlins (2015–2019)

Career highlights and awards
- All-Star (2010)

Martín Manuel Prado Torcate (born October 27, 1983) is a Venezuelan former professional baseball third baseman. He played in Major League Baseball (MLB) for the Atlanta Braves, Arizona Diamondbacks, New York Yankees and Miami Marlins. During his time with the Braves, Prado played in the 2010 All-Star Game. Primarily a third baseman, second baseman, and left fielder, Prado started at every position during his MLB career except for pitcher, catcher, and center field.

== Early life ==
Martín Manuel Prado was born in Maracay, Venezuela. He was one of four siblings raised in a single-parent family headed by their mother, Irma Prado.

He signed with the Atlanta Braves as a non-drafted free agent on February 23, 2001. He played in the Braves' Dominican program in 2001 and 2002, and came to the United States to join the Gulf Coast League in 2003. After relocating to the United States, he taught himself English from film subtitles.

== Professional career ==
=== Atlanta Braves ===
==== 2006 ====
Prado made his major league debut on April 23, 2006, going 1 for 2 and logging a triple. He was later sent down to the Triple-A Richmond Braves, but was called back up to the majors later in the season. He hit his first career home run on September 14, 2006, against Jamie Moyer of the Philadelphia Phillies.

In 2006, Prado played 24 games batting .262 with 1 home run, and 9 RBIs.

==== 2007 ====
Prado was called up for the 2007 season on May 20 and was sent down on June 2. He was called up again on August 7. He was sent down on August 22 to make room for the recently activated Édgar Rentería, but Rentería was injured in his first at bat. Prado was called up to stay on September 4.

In the 9th inning of the September 12, 2007, game against the New York Mets, Prado hit a ball in play and, upon dropping his bat to head towards first base, the bat stood perfectly upright. SportsNet New York commentator Keith Hernandez described the incident as one "that would never happen in a hundred years."

In 2007, Prado played 28 games batting .288 with 0 home runs, and 2 RBI.

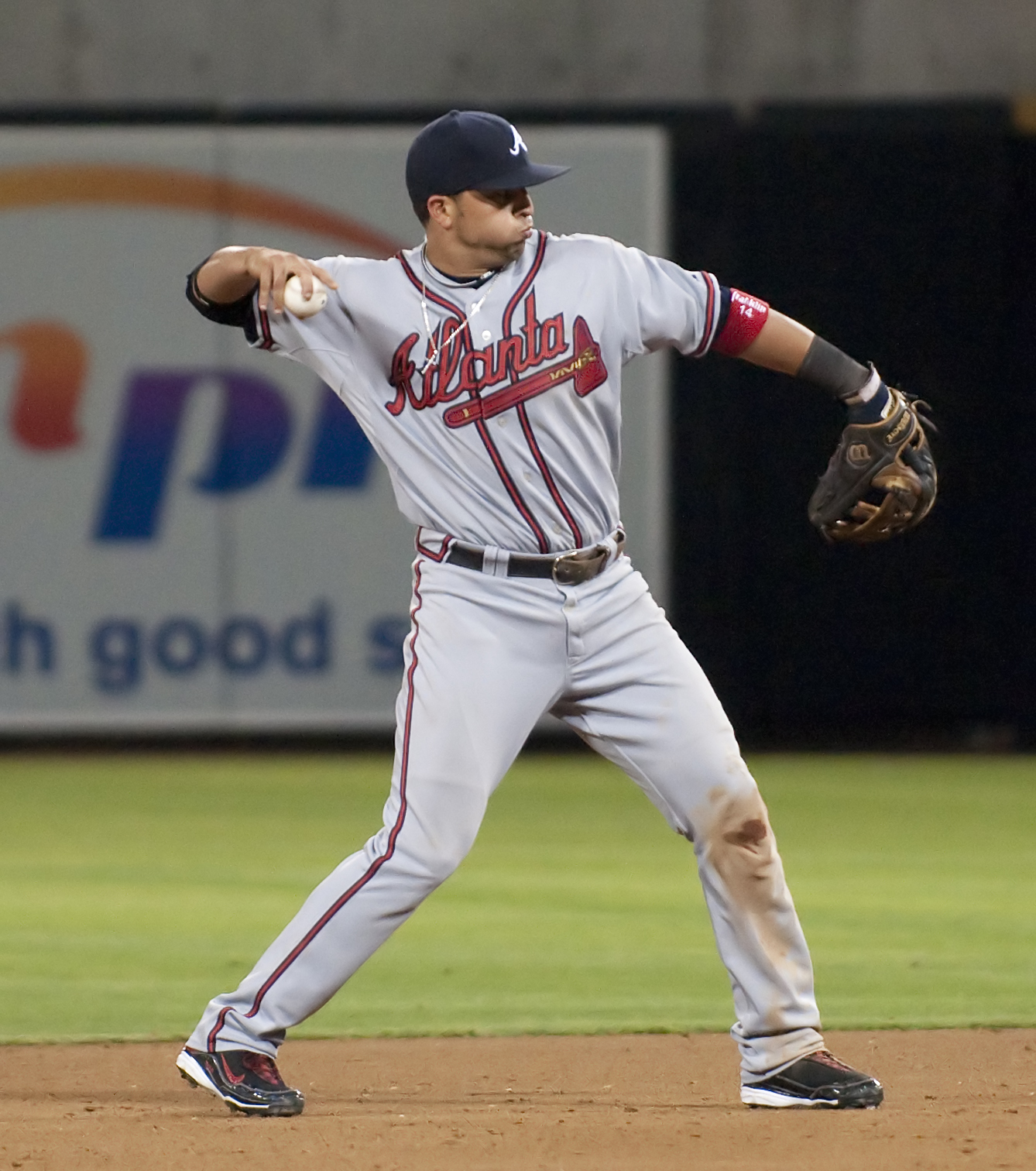
Prado playing for the Atlanta Braves in 2009

==== 2009 ====
During the 2009 season, Prado stepped in as the Braves' starter at second base when Kelly Johnson went on the disabled list midway through the season. Prado took full advantage of the opportunity, to the extent that he remained the starter at second, batting second in the lineup, even after Johnson's return to the active roster. Prado's final stats for the season consisted of a .307 average, 14 home runs, 49 RBIs, and 64 runs scored in 450 at-bats over the course of 128 games. In addition to playing 63 games at second, he showed versatility by playing 41 games at third and 28 at first.

==== 2010 ====
Prado made a huge statement in his career on May 10, 2010, against the Milwaukee Brewers in which he hit a grand slam against Brewers pitcher, Manny Parra. Over the course of the season, he was moved from the No. 2 spot in the batting order to the leadoff spot to take advantage of his high batting average.

Prado told reporters that he lost 14 pounds during the 2010 off-season doing the P90X fitness program, and is starting spring training stronger and "more agile."

On July 8, 2010, Prado led the Major Leagues in hits with 121 and led the NL with a .325 Batting Average. He was selected to the 2010 All-Star Game as a reserve, and started in place of Chase Utley. In late September, Prado suffered from a hip pointer, and an MRI revealed that he had a torn external oblique, causing him to miss the remainder of the season and the playoffs.

==== 2011 ====
In the 2010–11 off-season the Braves acquired former Florida Marlins starting second baseman Dan Uggla in a trade for Omar Infante and reliever Mike Dunn. Although the trade was widely praised, it left the Braves in a conundrum as they now had two All Star starting second basemen on the roster. Prado was approached about moving to left field, which he did without any public complaint. On May 13, 2011, in a game versus the Washington Nationals in which the Braves were trailing 5–1 in the 7th inning, Prado notched his second career grand slam after a 10-pitch duel with Nationals reliever Sean Burnett, putting the Braves on course to win 6–5 in the 10th inning.

On July 26, 2011, in a game against the Pittsburgh Pirates that ended with a controversial call on a play at home plate, Prado went 0-for-9 and left eight men on base. He was on deck when the game ended.

Prado was treated for a staph infection in his right calf and placed on the 15-day DL on June 10, 2011. He returned from the disabled list on July 15, going 2–5 with a home run in his first game back. In 2011, Prado played 129 games batting .260 with 13 home runs, and 57 RBI.

==== 2012 ====
Prado improved much in 2012 as he played in 156 games batting .301 with 10 home runs, 42 doubles, 6 triples, and 70 RBI.

=== Arizona Diamondbacks ===
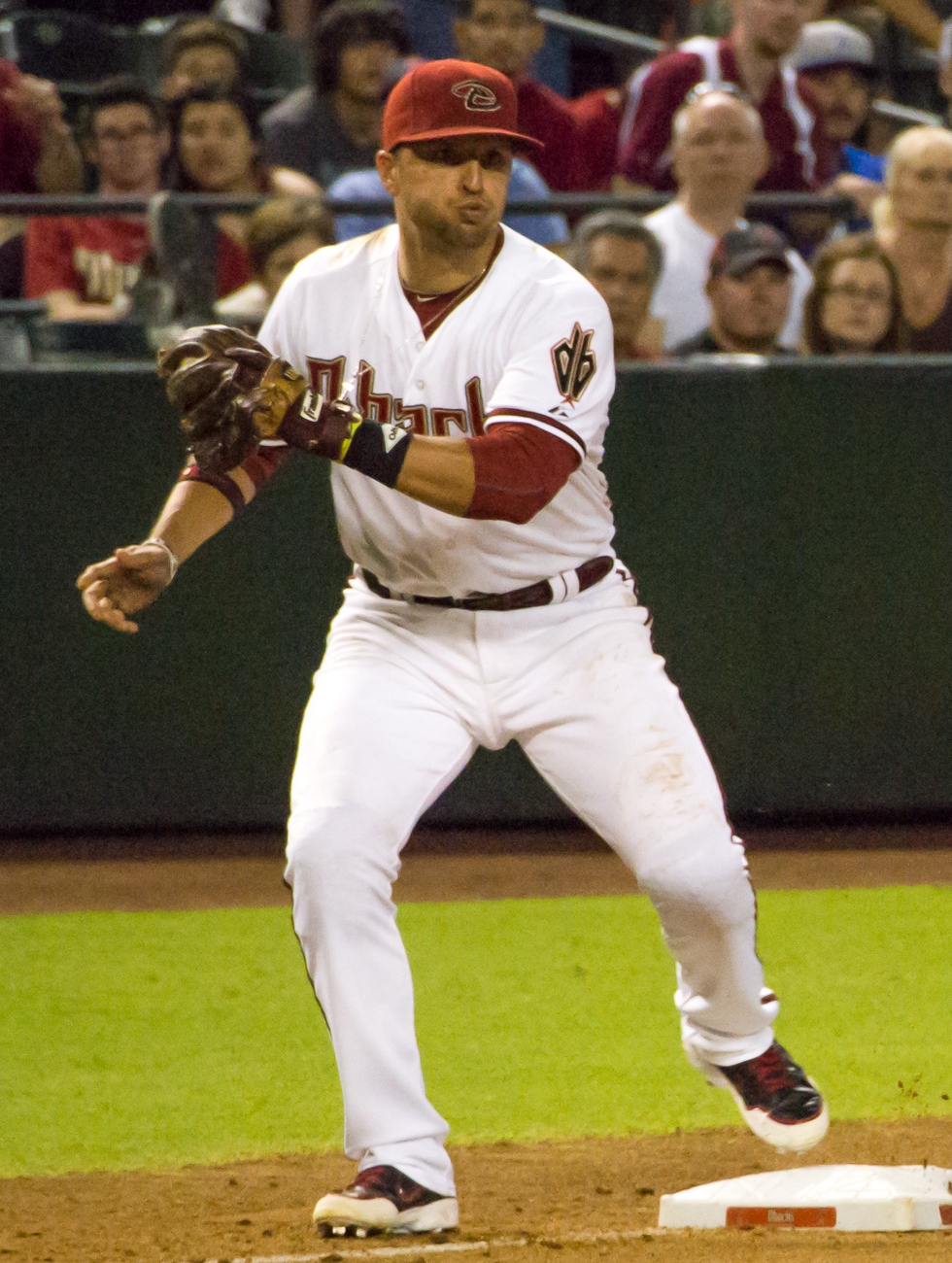
Prado playing for the Arizona Diamondbacks in 2013

==== 2013 ====
After the 2012 season, the Braves traded Prado with Randall Delgado, Nick Ahmed, Zeke Spruill and Brandon Drury to the Arizona Diamondbacks for Justin Upton and Chris Johnson. On January 31, 2013, the Diamondbacks and Prado agreed on a 4-year, $40 million extension. In 2013, Prado batted .282 with 14 home runs, 36 doubles, and 82 RBI in 155 games played.

==== 2014 ====
Prado began the 2014 season with the Diamondbacks by playing 106 games batting .270 with 5 home runs, and 42 RBI.

=== New York Yankees ===
On July 31, 2014, Prado was traded to the New York Yankees in exchange for catching prospect Peter O'Brien and a player to be named later. A few weeks after his acquisition, he hit a walk-off base hit into center field to give the Yankees a win over the Chicago White Sox.

On September 16, 2014, Prado underwent an emergency appendectomy, resulting on the Yankees putting him on the 60-Day Disabled List, ending his season. In 37 games with the Yankees, Prado batted .316 with 7 home runs and 16 RBI. Overall in 2014, combined with both teams, Prado played 143 total games batting .282 with 12 home runs, 26 doubles, and 58 RBI.

=== Miami Marlins ===
On December 19, 2014, the Yankees traded Prado and David Phelps to the Miami Marlins for Nathan Eovaldi, Garrett Jones, and Domingo Germán. Playing primarily at third base, Prado enjoyed successful campaigns in 2015 and 2016, batting .297 overall in 1,086 at bats, with a .350 on base percentage, and a .405 slugging percentage. In 2016 he led all MLB hitters (60 or more plate appearances) in batting average against left-handers, at .424. On September 27, 2016, the Marlins announced a three-year, $40 million contract extension that would keep Prado in Miami through 2019. In their final game of the 2016 season, the Marlins allowed Prado to serve as player-manager; he started the game at third base and played for three innings before taking himself out of the game.

Prado's 2017 and 2018 seasons were severely hampered by a series of different injuries which landed him on the disabled list seven separate times. On March 26, 2017, the Marlins placed Prado on the 15-day disabled list due to a Grade 1 hamstring strain, an injury he suffered during the 2017 World Baseball Classic. Prado returned to the DL in mid-May after his hamstring began bothering him again and did not return until the end of June. He then injured his knee in mid-July making an off-balanced throw and later in the same game tweaking it during an at-bat. Prado ended up missing the rest of 2017 after needing surgery to repair the injured knee. His recovery from that knee surgery took longer than expected and he began the 2018 season on the DL. Upon his return in May, Prado struggled at the plate and only hit .194 before straining his left hamstring in a game on May 25 and was placed on the 10-day disabled list. Prado returned to action on July 5 and hit at a .290 clip upon his return. However, Prado injured his left quadriceps in a game on Aug 13 and was placed on the disabled list yet again. His 2018 season ended on September 3 when Prado suffered an abdominal strain and was placed on the 60-day disabled list.

Prado retired after the 2019 season.

== See also ==
- List of Major League Baseball players from Venezuela
