= Mike Belfiore =

American baseball player (born 1988)

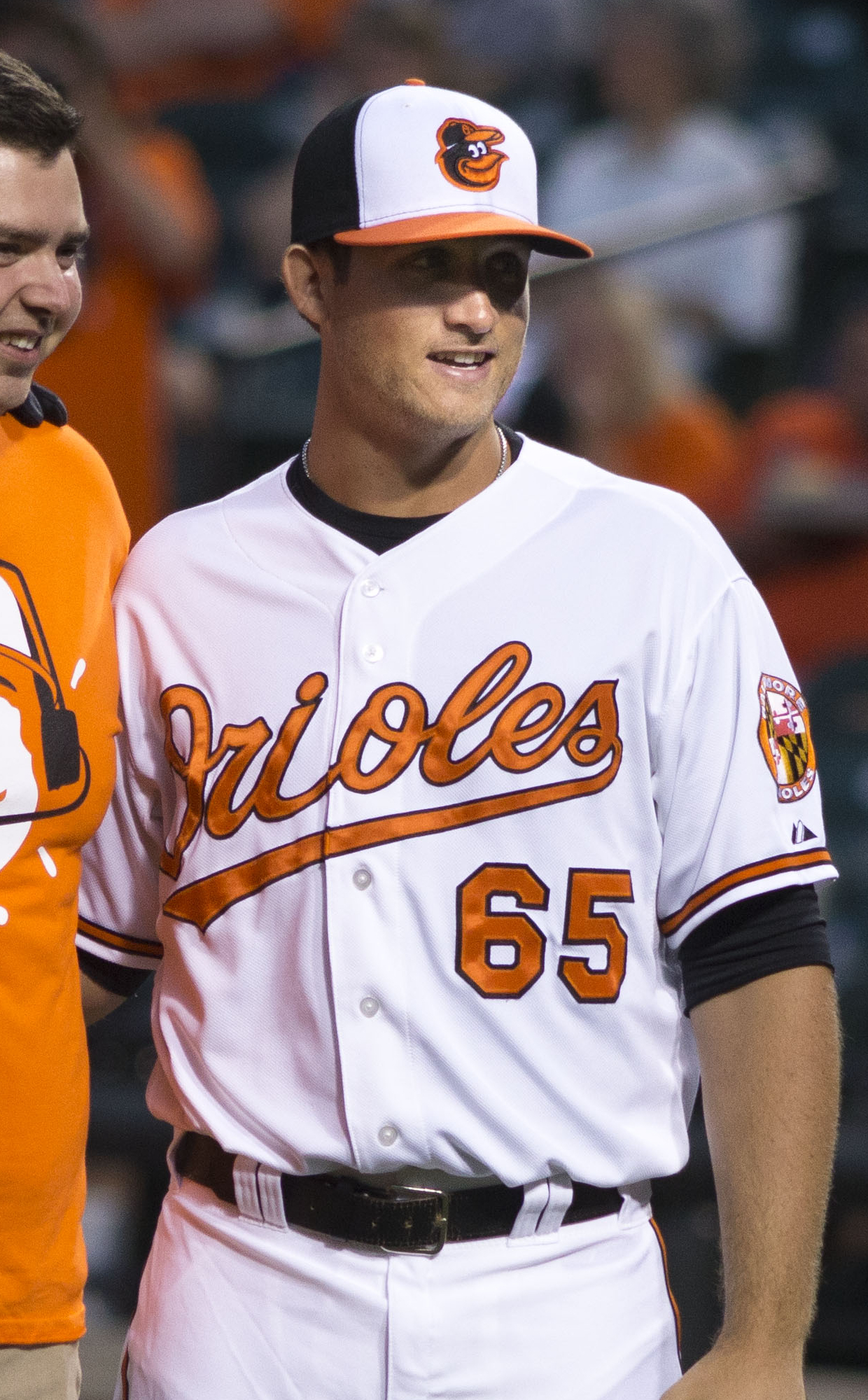
- Belfiore with the Baltimore Orioles
- Pitcher
- Born: October 3, 1988 (age 37); Commack, New York, U.S.
- Batted: Right Threw: Left

MLB debut
- September 27, 2013, for the Baltimore Orioles

Last MLB appearance
- September 27, 2013, for the Baltimore Orioles

MLB statistics
- Win–loss record: 0–0
- Earned run average: 13.50
- Strikeouts: 0
- Stats at Baseball Reference

Teams
- Baltimore Orioles (2013)

Michael John Belfiore (born October 3, 1988) is an American former professional baseball pitcher. He played in Major League Baseball (MLB) for the Baltimore Orioles in 2013.

Belfiore attended Boston College where he was a first baseman and a pitcher. After being drafted by the Arizona Diamondbacks in the 2009 Major League Baseball draft, Belfiore became a full-time pitcher. Belfiore has played professionally with the Missoula Osprey (2009), and the South Bend Silver Hawks (2010). He was a Pioneer League All-Star in 2009. He stands at 6 feet 2 inches (1.88 m) and weighs 220 pounds (100 kg). Belfiore bats right-handed, while throwing left.

== Amateur career ==
Belfiore attended Commack High School, where he played first base, outfield, and pitcher as a member of the school's baseball team. During his senior season in 2006, Belfiore won the Section XI League Most Valuable Player award; the Gibson Award, an award given to the best pitcher in Suffolk County; was named to All-Long Island team; was a first-team All-State All-League and All-County selection; and won the Commack High School Most Outstanding Athlete award. He was also a Suffolk County Hall of Fame inductee in 2006. He started all four of his years on the school's baseball team.

He was perhaps best known in high school for his epic showdown with pitcher Jesse Katz, of Northport High School.

After high school, Belfiore enrolled at Boston College. During his freshman year, as a member of the Boston College Eagles baseball team, Belfiore batted .297 with eight doubles, one triple, three home runs, and 22 runs batted in (RBIs) in 49 games played as a first baseman and designated hitter. As a pitcher, Belfiore compiled a 0–2 record with a 10.45 earned run average (ERA), one save, and five strikeouts in seven games, one start.

During his sophomore season at Boston College, Belfiore batted .274 with 10 doubles, two home runs, and 26 RBIs as a position player. As a pitcher, he went 2–0 with a 2.45 ERA, eight saves, and 19 strikeouts in 18 games. In 2008, he played collegiate summer baseball in the Cape Cod Baseball League for the Yarmouth-Dennis Red Sox.

In his junior year, Belfiore batted .273 with 17 doubles, one triple, 11 home runs, and 62 RBIs at the plate. He went 5–1 with a 2.05 ERA, nine saves, and 59 strikeouts on the mound. After the season, he was an American Baseball Coaches Association All-American Second-Team selection. He was also named the National Collegiate Baseball Writers Association District I Player of the Year. During the 2009 Major League Baseball draft, the Arizona Diamondbacks selected Belfiore with the 45th pick in the first round. He was one of five players selected by the Diamondbacks in the first-round during the 2009 draft. At the time, it was commented that Belfiore would be used as a pitcher in professional baseball.

== Professional career ==
=== Arizona Diamondbacks ===
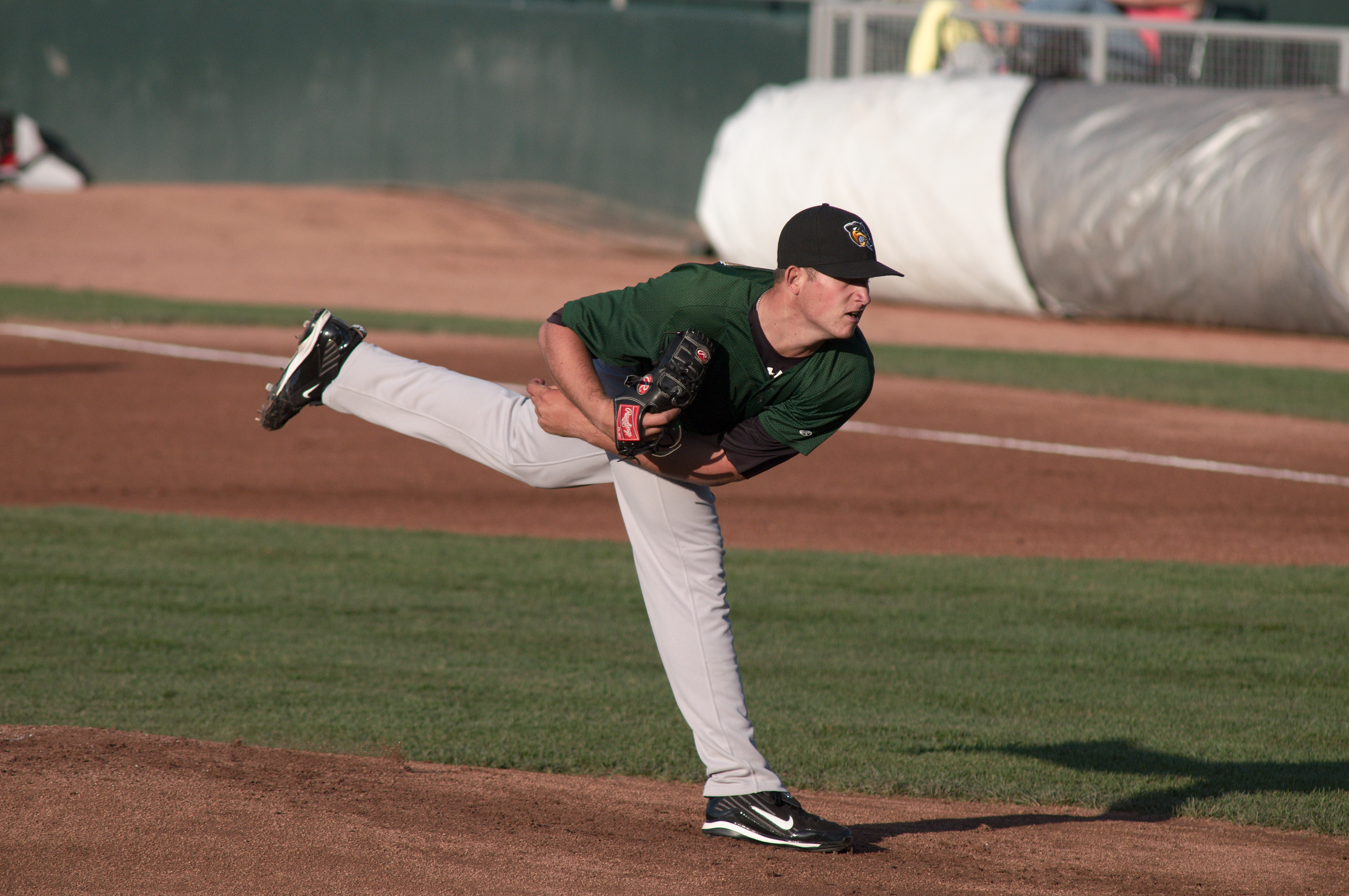
Belfiore pitching for the South Bend Silver Hawks, the Single-A affiliate of the Arizona Diamondbacks, in 2010

Belfiore made his professional baseball debut in 2009 with the rookie-level Missoula Osprey of the Pioneer League. On the subject of pitching in professional baseball, Belfiore said, "In college I just threw fastballs and a slider and blew guys away...You have to use your changeup and understand hitters counts [at this level]". He was a league all-star that season. With Missoula, he went 2–2 with a 2.17 ERA, and 55 strikeouts in 14 games, 11 starts. At the start of the 2010 season, Belfiore was assigned to play with the South Bend Silver Hawks of the Single-A Midwest League. On the season, he compiled a 3–10 record with a 3.99 ERA, and 105 strikeouts in 25 games, all starts.

Belfiore made 35 appearances (eight starts) for the High-A Visalia Rawhide during the 2011 campaign, logging a 4-4 record and 5.92 ERA with 79 strikeouts over 79 innings of work; he returned to Visalia to begin 2012, recording a 2.37 ERA with 28 strikeouts in 12 games.

=== Baltimore Orioles ===
Belfiore was traded to the Baltimore Orioles as the player to be named later in the April trade that sent Josh Bell to Arizona on May 12, 2012. In 28 appearances down the stretch for the Double-A Bowie Baysox, he compiled a 5-1 record and 2.71 ERA with 78 strikeouts and three saves across 66 1/3 innings pitched.

Belfiore was recalled by the Orioles from the Triple-A Norfolk Tides on May 12, 2013, and returned to Norfolk the next day. Belfiore was recalled again on September 21, and made his major league debut on September 27. Pitching to his first batter, he allowed a home run to David Ortiz.

Belfiore was designated for assignment by the Orioles on March 30, 2014.

=== Detroit Tigers ===
On April 3, 2014, the Detroit Tigers claimed Belfiore off waivers and assigned him to the Triple-A Toledo Mud Hens. He made 35 appearances (13 starts) for the Triple-A Toledo Mud Hens, posting a 5-7 record and 3.25 ERA with 60 strikeouts across 91 1/3 innings pitched.

Belfiore returned to Toledo for the 2015 season, logging a 5-11 record and 5.60 ERA with 77 strikeouts over 22 starts. Belfiore was released by Detroit on August 15, 2015, to clear roster space for Kyle Lobstein, who had been sent to the Mud Hens on a rehab assignment.

=== Baltimore Orioles (second stint) ===
On August 19, 2015, Belfiore signed a minor league contract with the Baltimore Orioles. He finished the year with the Triple-A Norfolk Tides, recording a 2.31 ERA with five strikeouts in 11 2/3 innings pitched across three starts. Belfiore elected free agency following the season on November 6.

== Personal ==
Belfiore was born in Commack, New York. He is the middle child of Michael and Patricia Belfiore.
