= 2009 Major League Baseball draft =

Baseball draft of amateur players by Major League Baseball

General information
- Date: June 9–11, 2009
- Location: Secaucus, New Jersey
- Network: MLB Network

Overview
- 1521 total selections
- First selection: Stephen Strasburg; Washington Nationals
- First round selections: 49

The 2009 Major League Baseball draft was held June 9 to June 11 at the MLB Network Studios in Secaucus, New Jersey.

The drafting order is as follows:

== First-round selections ==
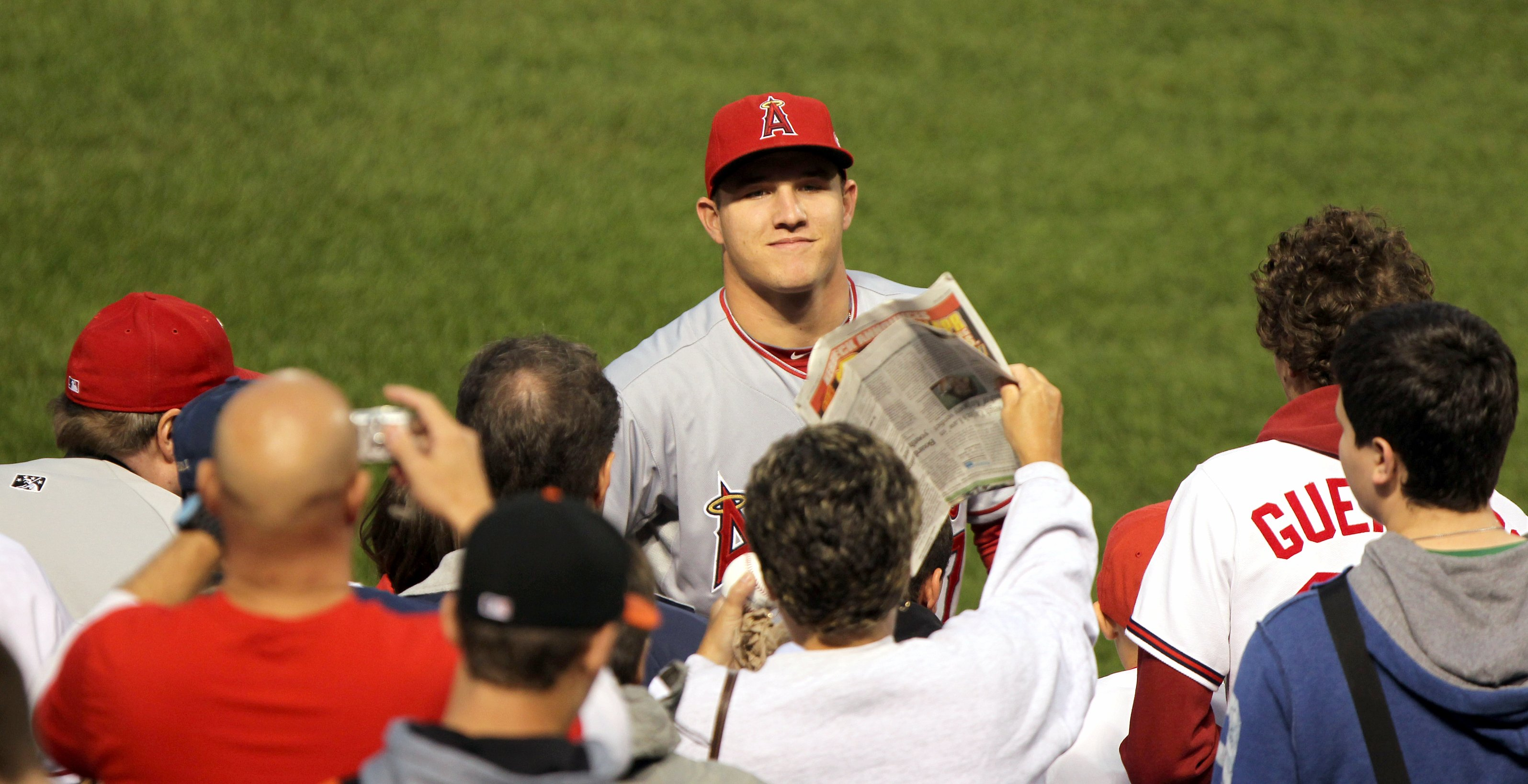
The Los Angeles Angels selected Mike Trout 25th overall. Trout is an 11× All-Star, 3× American League MVP, and 9× Silver Slugger as outfielder.

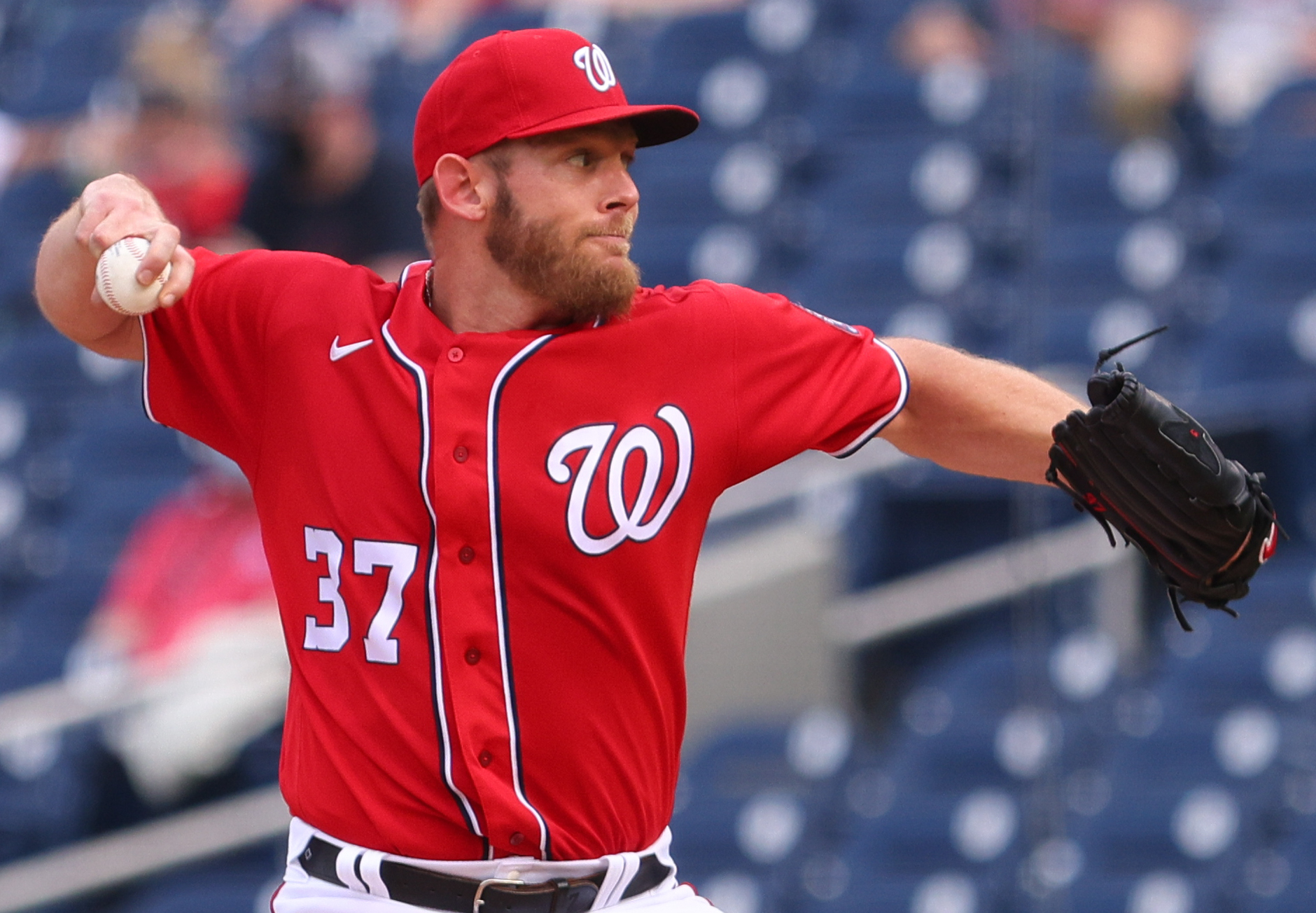
The Washington Nationals selected Stephen Strasburg first overall. The 3× All-Star helped lead the Nationals to a 2019 World Series win.

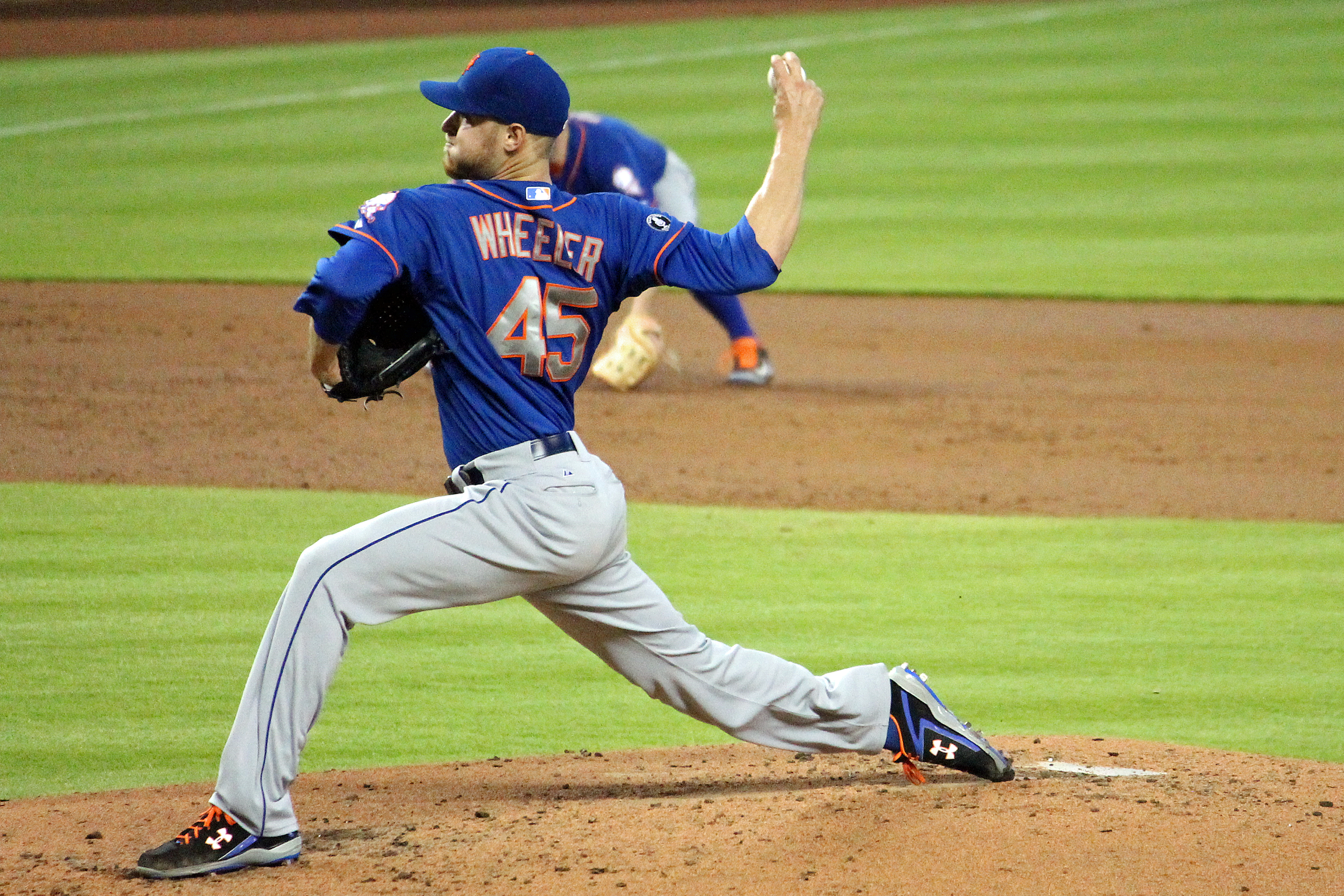
The San Francisco Giants selected Zack Wheeler 6th overall. He was a 2021 All-Star and led the National League in strikeouts.

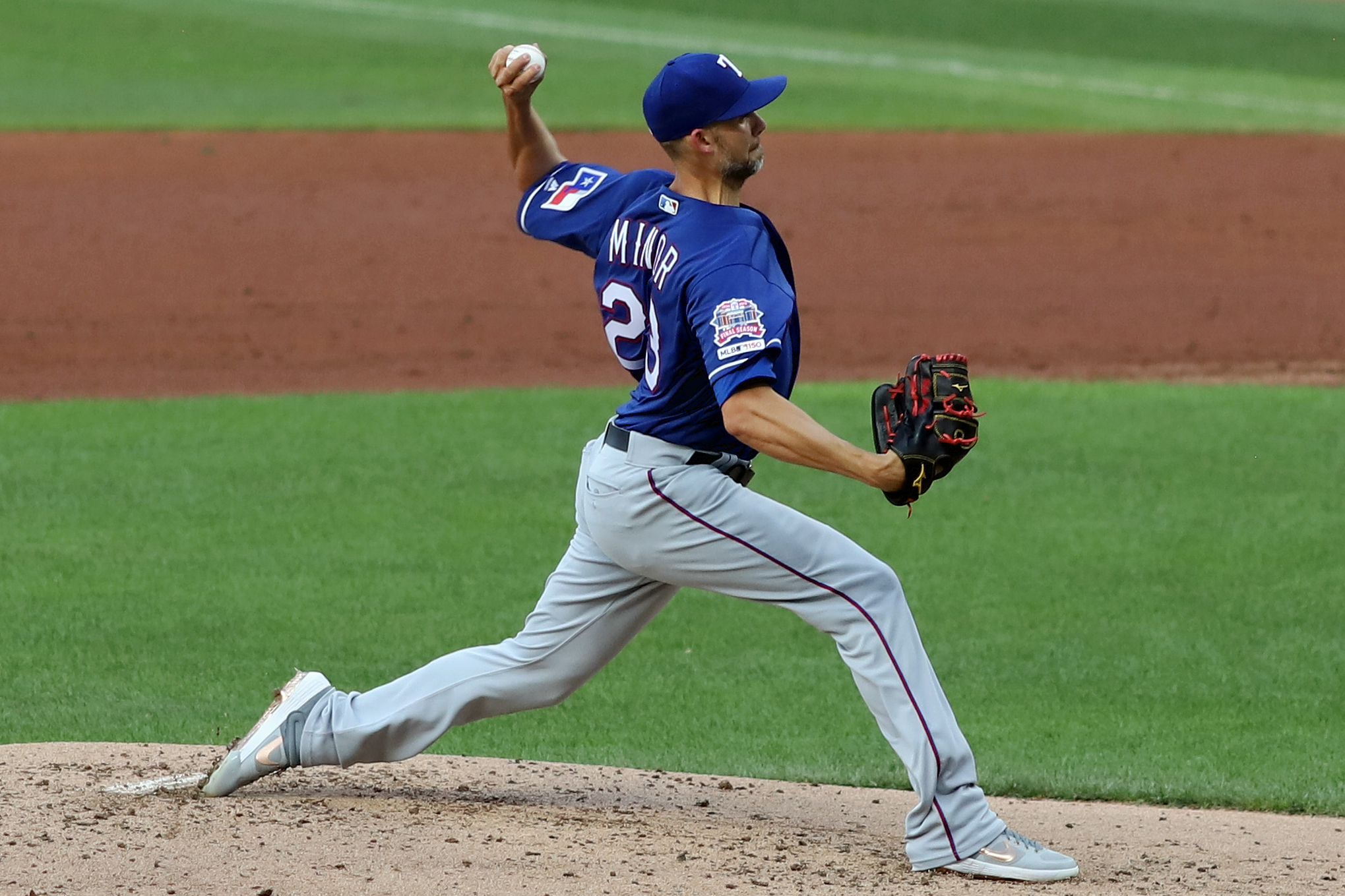
The Braves selected Mike Minor 7th overall. In Minor was named a 2019 All-Star.

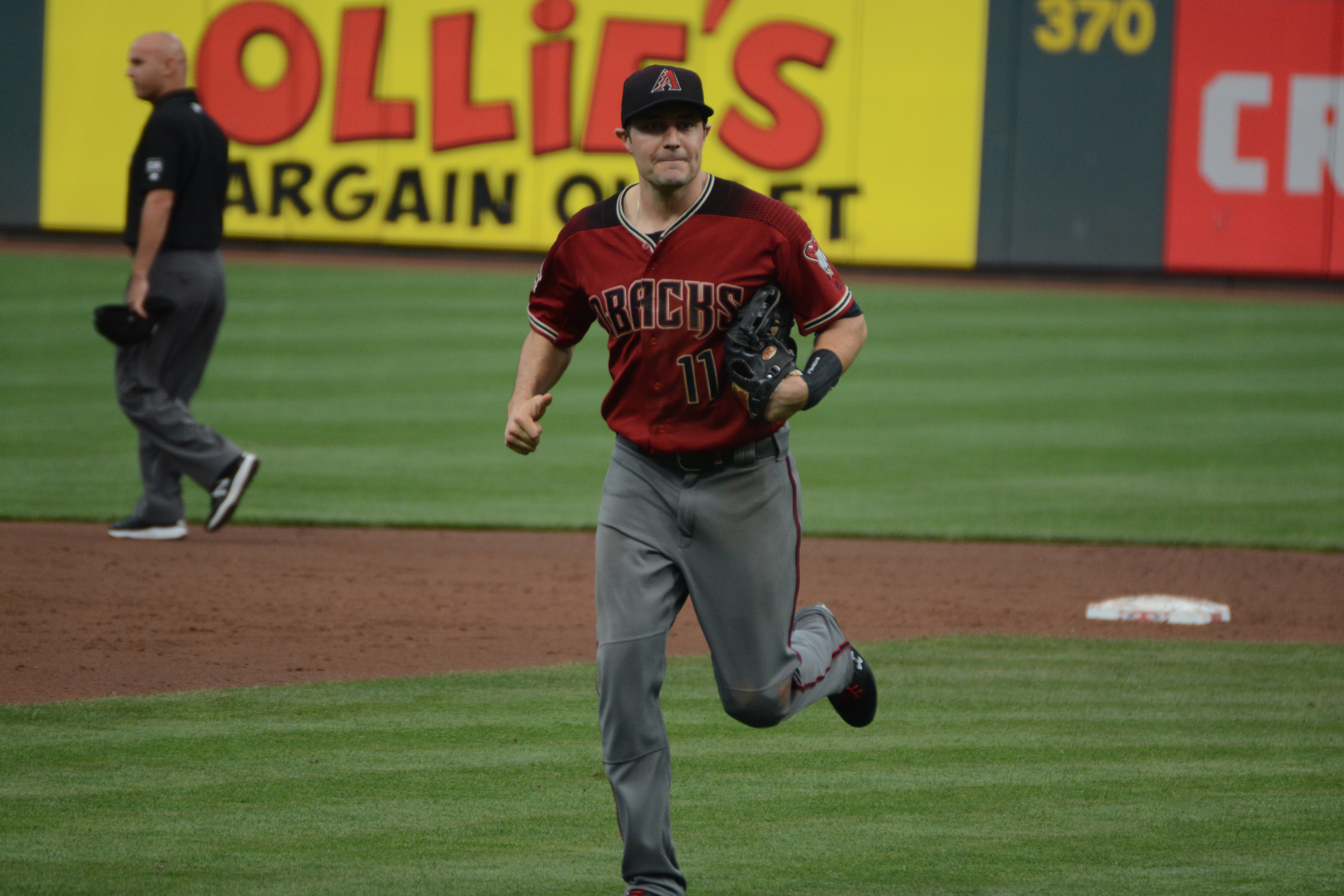
The Diamondbacks selected A. J. Pollock at 17. In 2015, he was selected as an All-Star and won the Gold Glove at outfield.

Key

	All-Star
*	Player did not sign

Pick	Player	Team	Position	School
1	Stephen Strasburg	Washington Nationals	Pitcher	San Diego State
2	Dustin Ackley	Seattle Mariners	Outfielder	North Carolina
3	Donavan Tate	San Diego Padres	Outfielder	Cartersville High School (GA)
4	Tony Sanchez	Pittsburgh Pirates	Catcher	Boston College
5	Matt Hobgood	Baltimore Orioles	Pitcher	Norco High School (CA)
6	Zack Wheeler	San Francisco Giants	Pitcher	East Paulding High School (GA)
7	Mike Minor	Atlanta Braves	Pitcher	Vanderbilt
8	Mike Leake	Cincinnati Reds	Pitcher	Arizona State
9	Jacob Turner	Detroit Tigers	Pitcher	Westminster Christian Academy (MO)
10	Drew Storen	Washington Nationals (Note: Compensation for failure to sign 2008 first-round pick Aaron Crow)	Pitcher	Stanford
11	Tyler Matzek	Colorado Rockies	Pitcher	Capistrano Valley High School (CA)
12	Aaron Crow	Kansas City Royals	Pitcher	Missouri
13	Grant Green	Oakland Athletics	Shortstop	Southern California
14	Matt Purke*	Texas Rangers	Pitcher	Klein High School (TX)
15	Alex White	Cleveland Indians	Pitcher	North Carolina
16	Bobby Borchering	Arizona Diamondbacks	Third baseman	Bishop Verot High School (FL)
17	A. J. Pollock	Arizona Diamondbacks (Note: Pick from Los Angeles Dodgers as compensation for signing of free agent Orlando Hudson)	Outfielder	Notre Dame
18	Chad James	Florida Marlins	Pitcher	Yukon High School (OK)
19	Shelby Miller	St. Louis Cardinals	Pitcher	Brownwood High School (TX)
20	Chad Jenkins	Toronto Blue Jays	Pitcher	Kennesaw State
21	Jiovanni Mier	Houston Astros	Shortstop	Bonita High School (CA)
22	Kyle Gibson	Minnesota Twins	Pitcher	Missouri
23	Jared Mitchell	Chicago White Sox	Outfielder	LSU
24	Randal Grichuk	Los Angeles Angels of Anaheim (Note: Pick from New York Mets as compensation for signing of free agent Francisco Rodríguez)	Outfielder	Lamar Consolidated High School (TX)
25	Mike Trout	Los Angeles Angels of Anaheim (Note: Pick from New York Yankees as compensation for signing of free agent Mark Teixeira)	Outfielder	Millville Senior High School (NJ)
26	Eric Arnett	Milwaukee Brewers	Pitcher	Indiana
27	Nick Franklin	Seattle Mariners (Note: Pick from Philadelphia Phillies as compensation for signing of free agent Raúl Ibañez)	Shortstop	Lake Brantley High School (FL)
28	Reymond Fuentes	Boston Red Sox	Outfielder	Fernando Callejo High School (P.R.)
29	Slade Heathcott	New York Yankees (Note: Compensation for failure to sign 2008 first-round pick Gerrit Cole)	Outfielder	Texas High School (TX)
30	LeVon Washington*	Tampa Bay Rays	Second baseman	Buchholz High School (FL)
31	Brett Jackson	Chicago Cubs	Outfielder	California
32	Tim Wheeler	Colorado Rockies (Note: Pick from Los Angeles Angels of Anaheim as compensation for signing of free agent Brian Fuentes)	Outfielder	Sacramento State

== Supplemental first-round selections ==
Pick	Player	Team	Position	School
33	Steve Baron	Seattle Mariners (Note: Compensation for loss of Type A free agent Raúl Ibañez to the Philadelphia Phillies)	Catcher	John A. Ferguson High School (FL)
34	Rex Brothers	Colorado Rockies (Note: Compensation for loss of Type A free agent Brian Fuentes to the Los Angeles Angels of Anaheim)	Left-handed pitcher	Lipscomb
35	Matthew Davidson	Arizona Diamondbacks (Note: Compensation for loss of Type A free agent Orlando Hudson to the Los Angeles Dodgers)	Third baseman	Yucaipa High School (CA)
36	Aaron Miller	Los Angeles Dodgers (Note: Compensation for loss of Type A free agent Derek Lowe to the Atlanta Braves)	Left-handed pitcher	Baylor
37	James Paxton*	Toronto Blue Jays (Note: Compensation for loss of Type A free agent A. J. Burnett to the New York Yankees)	Left-handed pitcher	Kentucky
38	Josh Phegley	Chicago White Sox (Note: Compensation for loss of Type A free agent Orlando Cabrera to the Oakland Athletics)	Catcher	Indiana
39	Kentrail Davis	Milwaukee Brewers (Note: Compensation for loss of Type A free agent CC Sabathia to the New York Yankees)	Outfielder	Tennessee
40	Tyler Skaggs	Los Angeles Angels of Anaheim (Note: Compensation for loss of Type A free agent Mark Teixeira to the New York Yankees)	Left-handed pitcher	Santa Monica High School (CA)
41	Chris Owings	Arizona Diamondbacks (Note: Compensation for loss of Type A free agent Juan Cruz to the Kansas City Royals)	Shortstop	Gilbert High School (SC)
42	Garrett Richards	Los Angeles Angels of Anaheim (Note: Compensation for loss of Type A free agent Francisco Rodriguez to the New York Mets)	Right-handed pitcher	Oklahoma
43	Brad Boxberger	Cincinnati Reds (Note: Compensation for loss of Type B free agent Jeremy Affeldt to the San Francisco Giants)	Right-handed pitcher	USC
44	Tanner Scheppers	Texas Rangers (Note: Compensation for loss of Type B free agent Milton Bradley to the Chicago Cubs)	Right-handed pitcher	Fresno State
45	Michael Belfiore	Arizona Diamondbacks (Note: Compensation for loss of Type B free agent Brandon Lyon to the Detroit Tigers)	Left-handed pitcher	Boston College
46	Matthew Bashore	Minnesota Twins (Note: Compensation for loss of Type B free agent Dennys Reyes to the St. Louis Cardinals)	Left-handed pitcher	Indiana
47	Kyle Heckathorn	Milwaukee Brewers (Note: Compensation for loss of Type B free agent Brian Shouse to the Tampa Bay Rays)	Right-handed pitcher	Kennesaw State
48	Tyler Kehrer	Los Angeles Angels of Anaheim (Note: Compensation for loss of Type B free agent Jon Garland to the Arizona Diamondbacks)	Left-handed pitcher	Eastern Illinois
49	Vic Black	Pittsburgh Pirates (Note: Compensation for failure to sign 2008 second-round pick Tanner Scheppers)	Right-handed pitcher	Dallas Baptist

From Baseball America

== Other notable selections ==
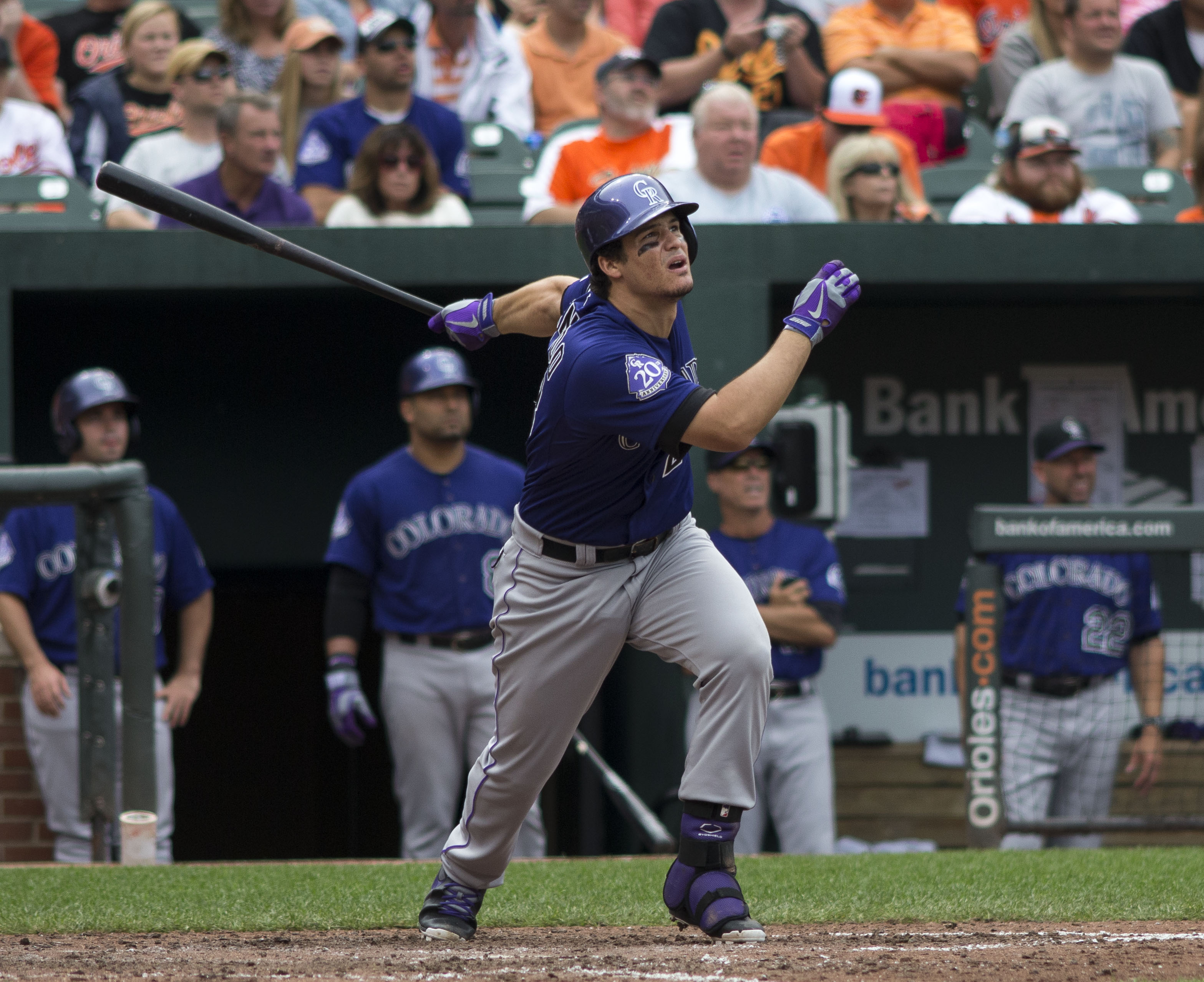
The Colorado Rockies selected Nolan Arenado in the second round. The 8× All-Star has won ten Gold Glove Awards at third base and six Silver Slugger Awards at third base.

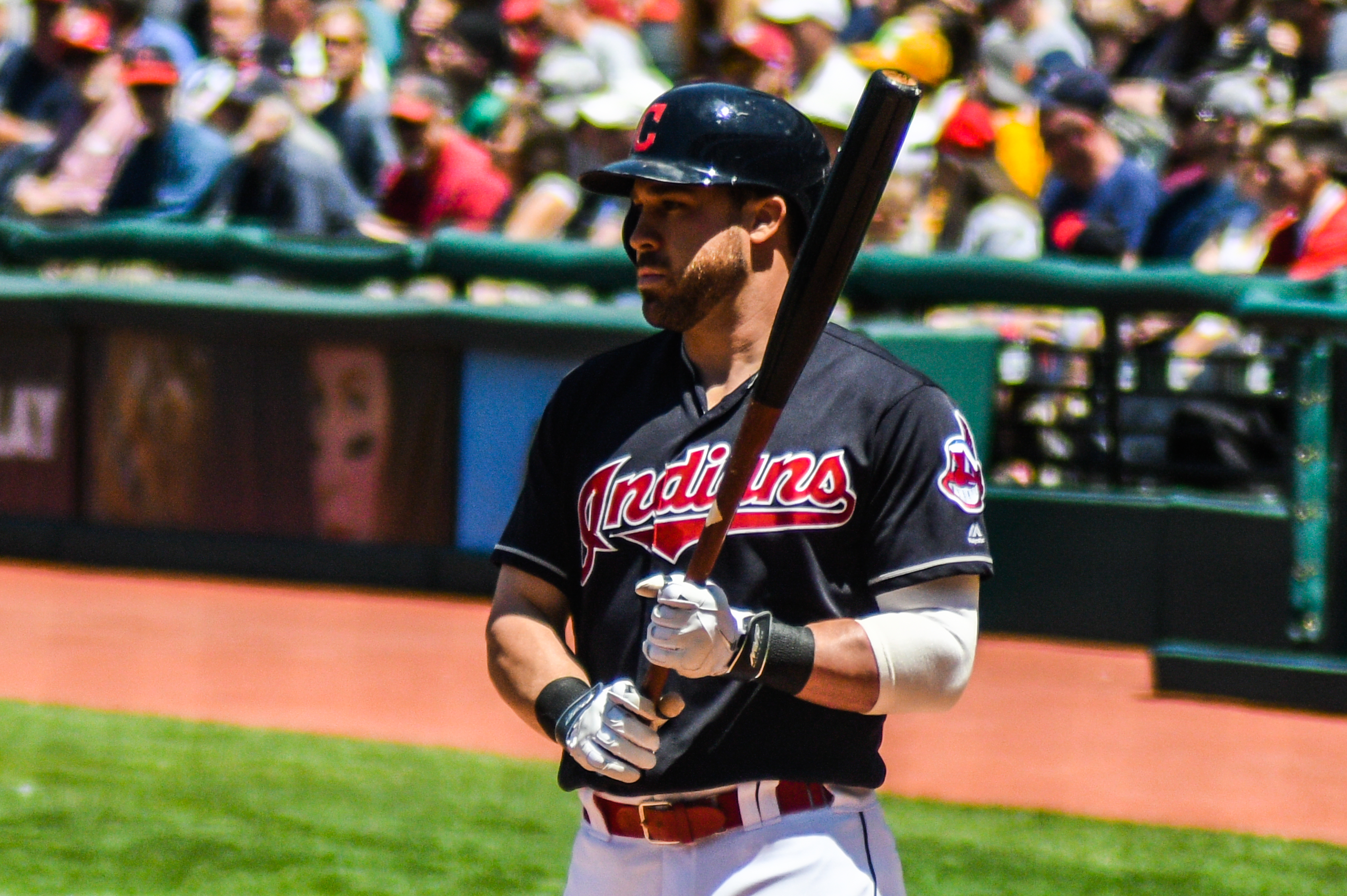
Cleveland selected Jason Kipnis in the second round. Kipnis is a 2× All-Star

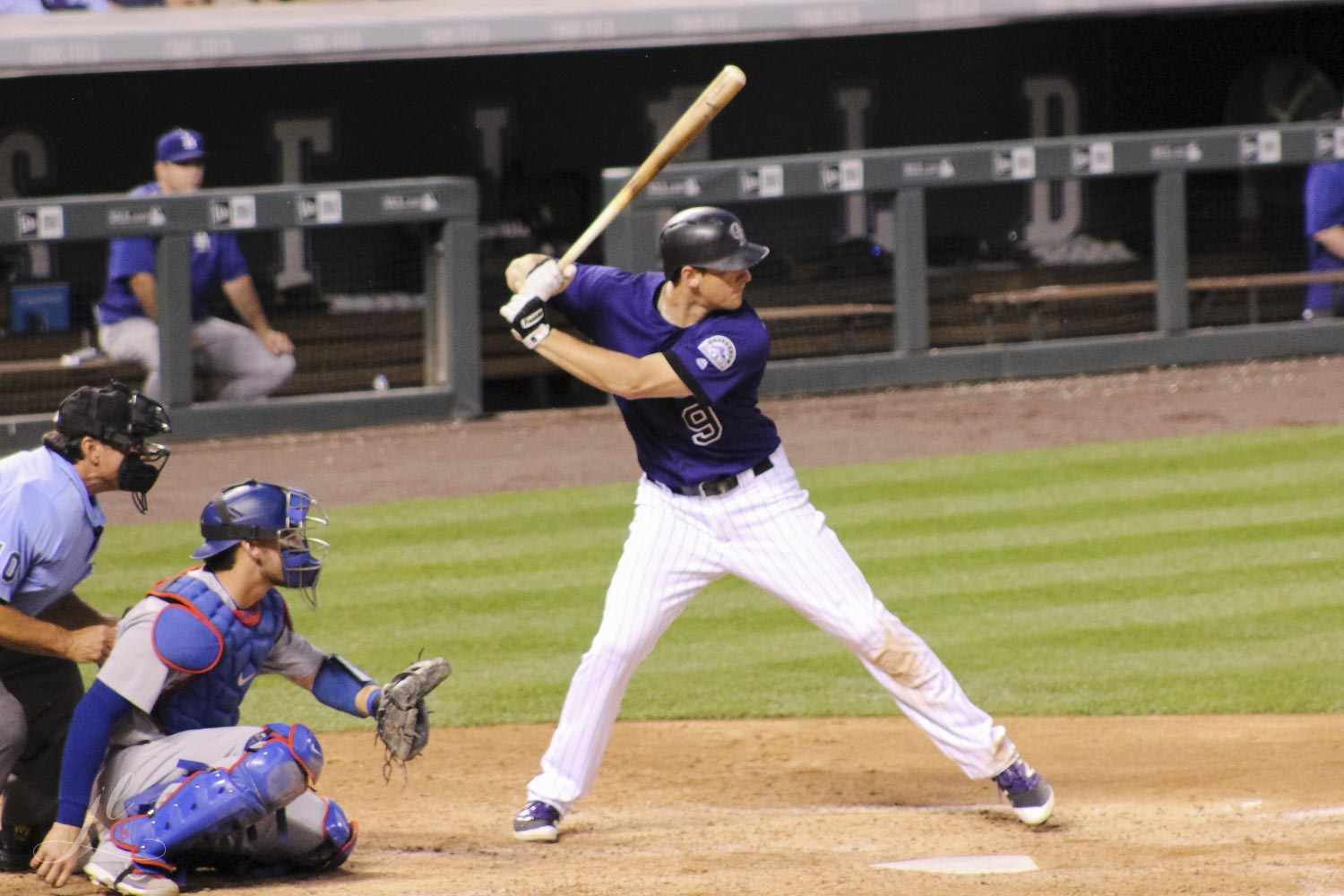
The Chicago Cubs selected DJ LeMahieu In the second round. LeMahieu is a 3× All-Star, 4× Gold Glove winner, and 2× Silver Slugger.

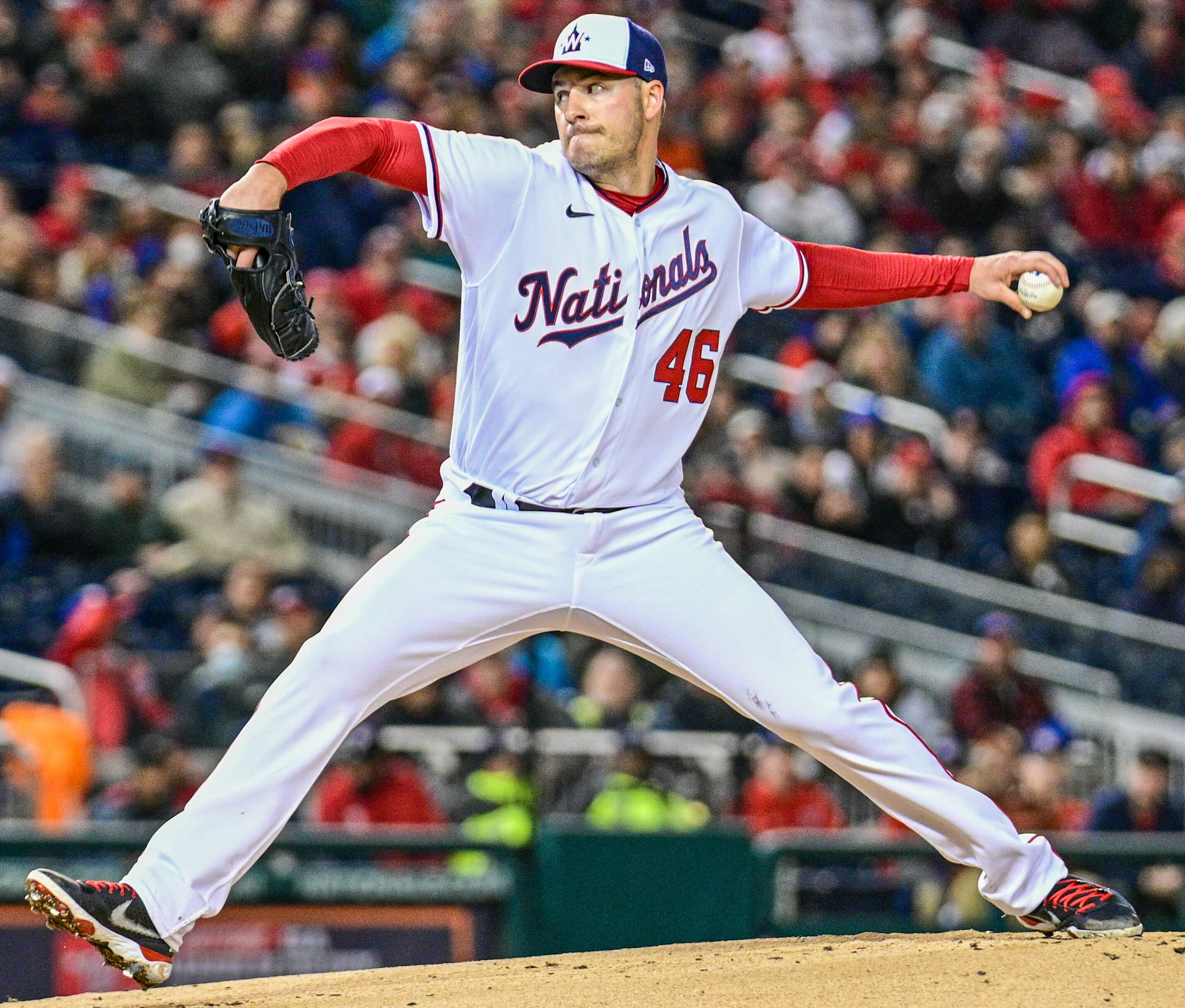
The Arizona Diamondbacks selected Patrick Corbin in the second round. Corbin is a 2× All-Star.

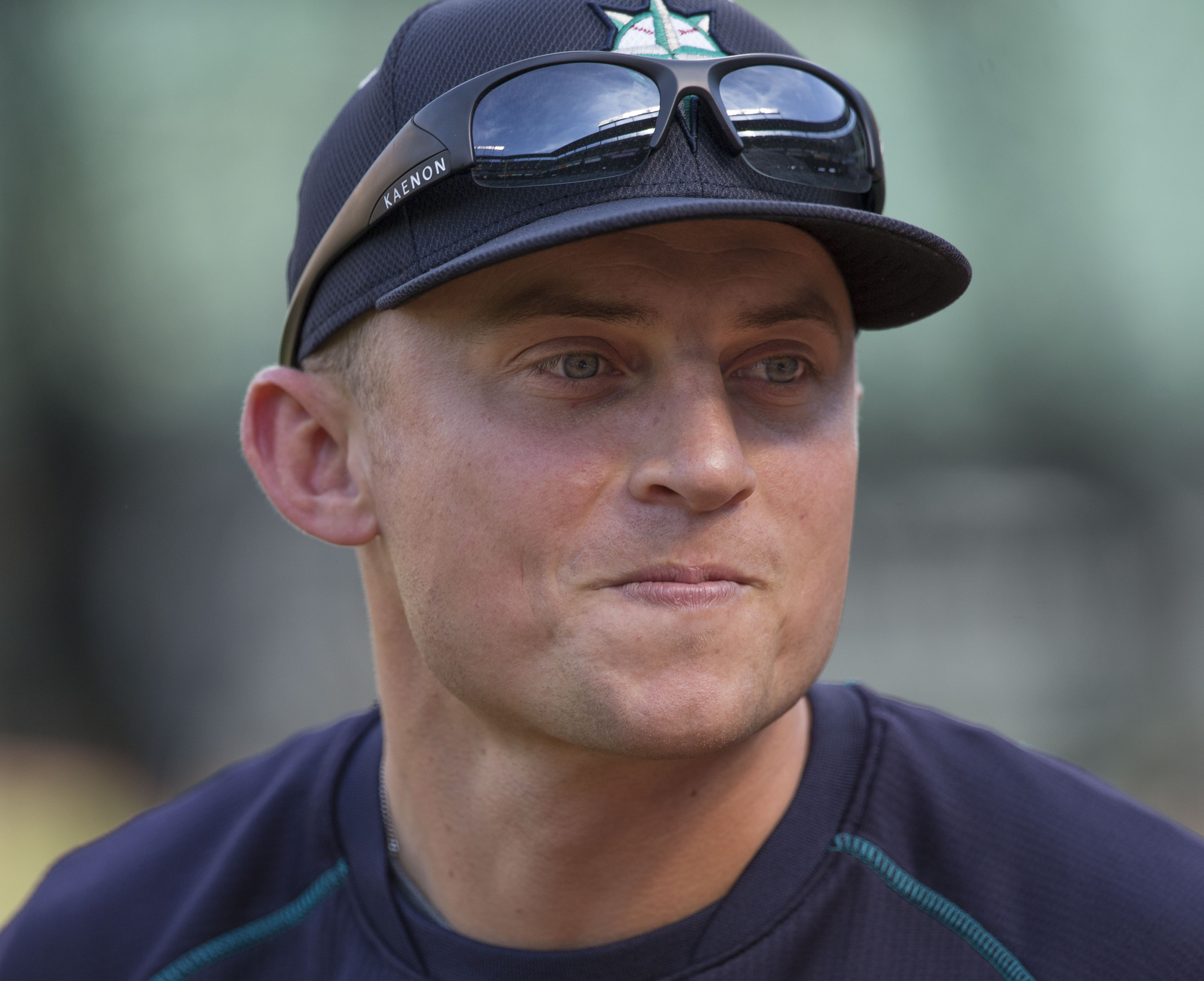
The Seattle Mariners selected Kyle Seager in the third round. Seager was a 2014 All-Star, and won the 2014 Gold Glove Award at third base.

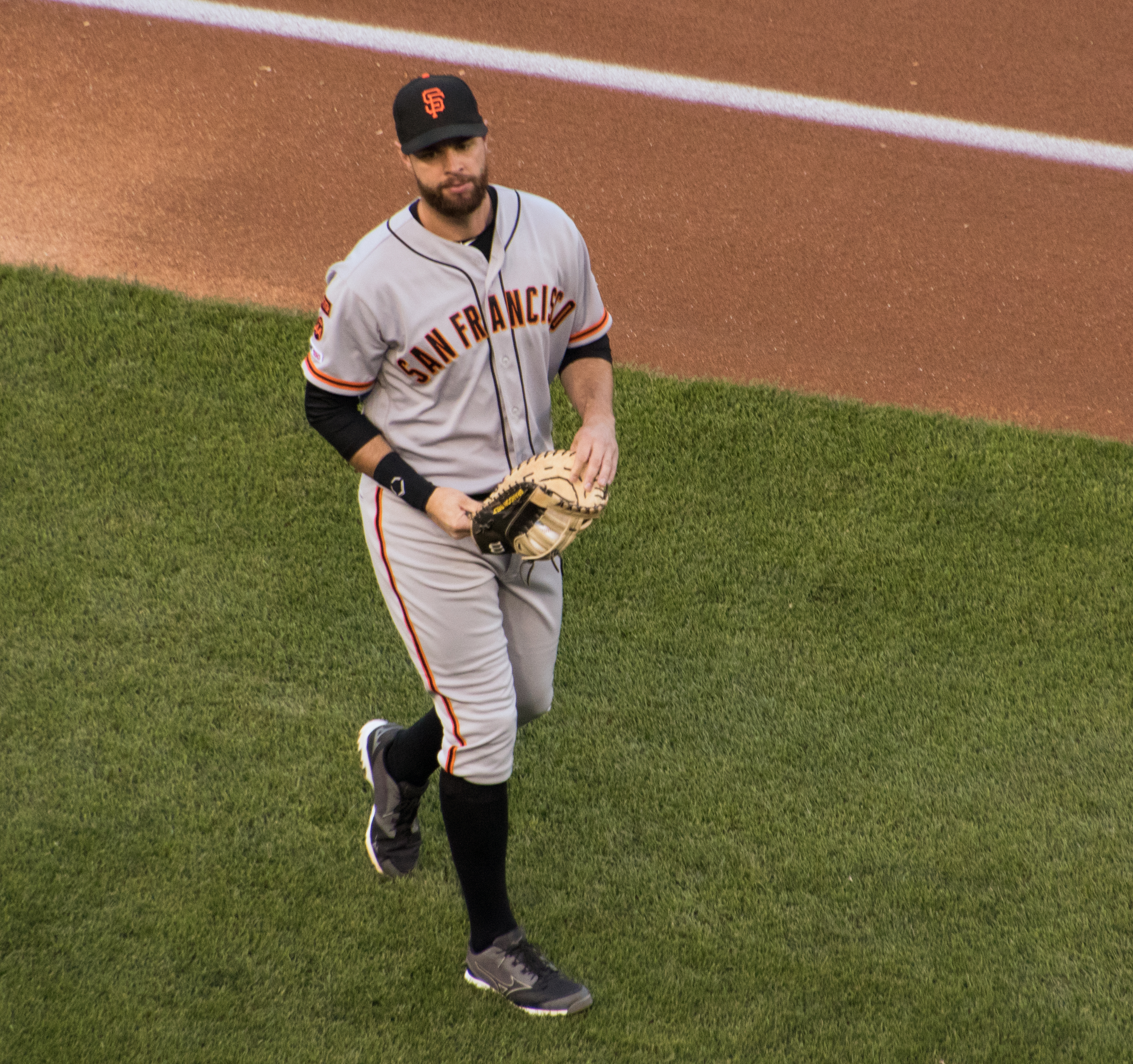
The San Francisco Giants selected Brandon Belt in the fifth round. Belt was a 2016 All-Star, and helped the Giants win the 2012 and 2014 World Series.

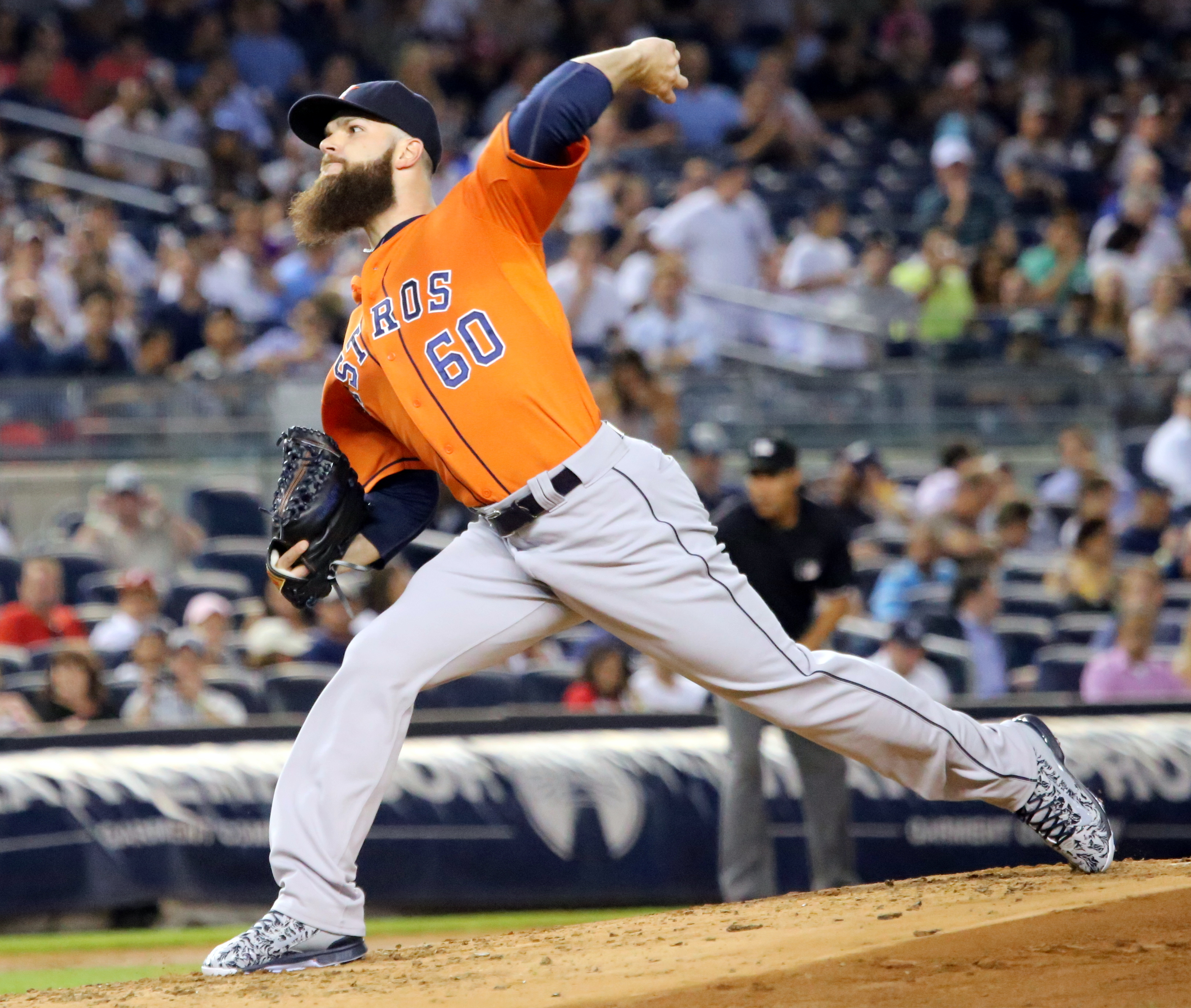
The Houston Astros selected Dallas Keuchel in the 7th round. Keuchel is a 2× All-Star who won the 2015 American League Cy Young Award, and five Gold Glove Award at pitcher.

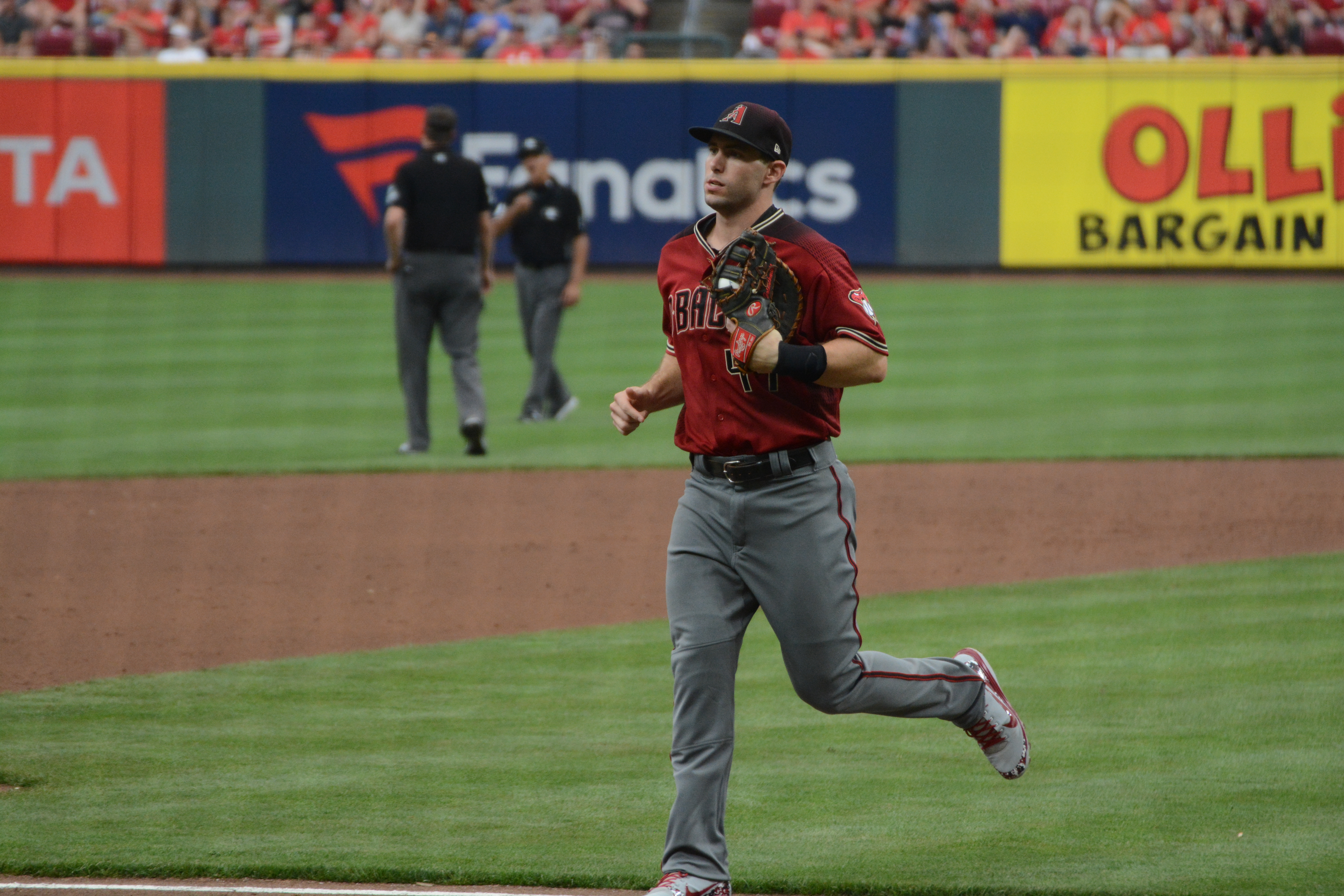
The Arizona Diamondbacks selected Paul Goldschmidt in the eight round. A 7× All-Star, Goldschmidt won 4 Gold Glove Awards at first base, 5 Silver Slugger Awards at first base, and the 2022 National League MVP.

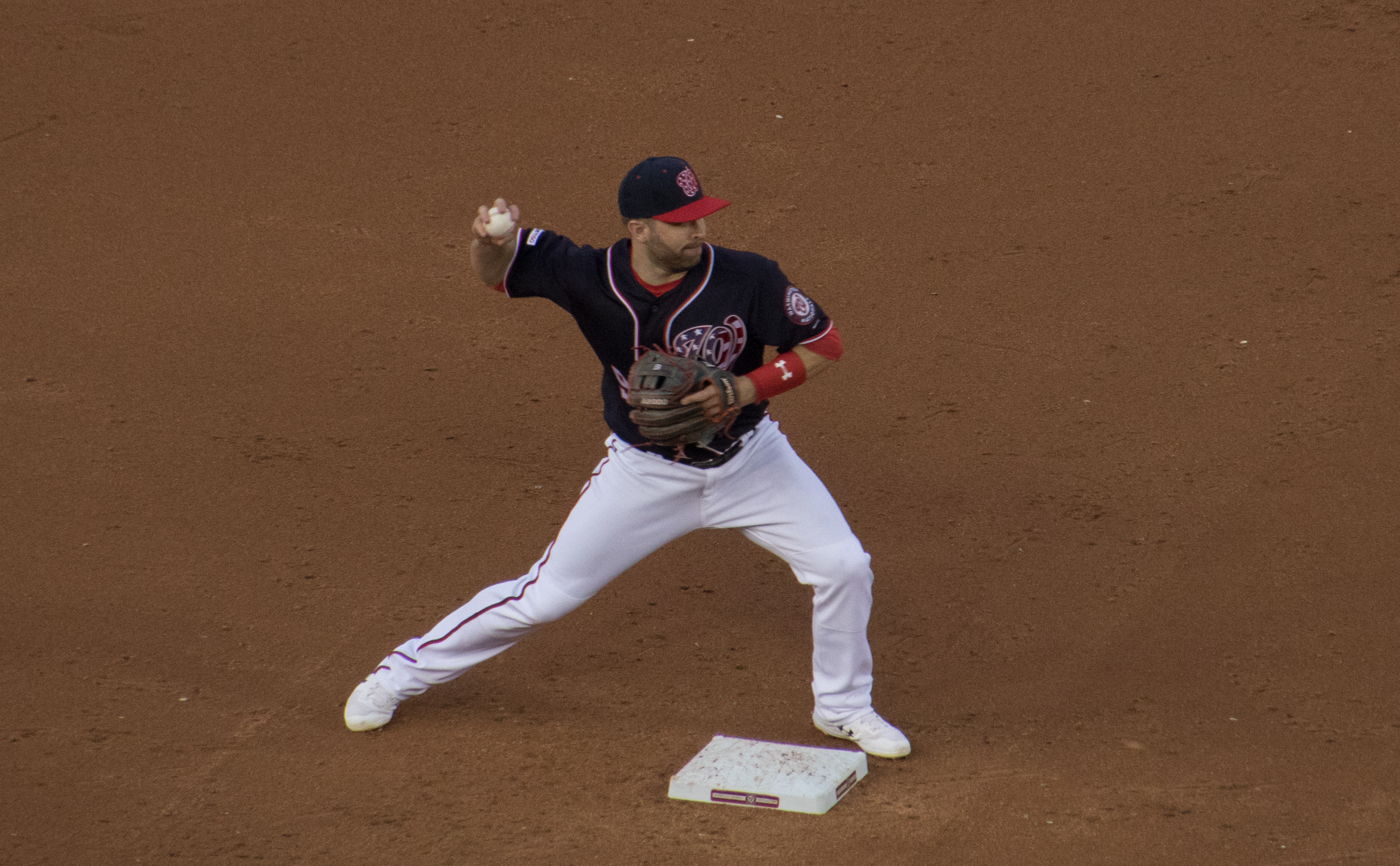
The Minnesota Twins selected Brian Dozier in the 8th round. Dozier was an All-Star in 2015 and the 2017 Gold Glove Award at second base.

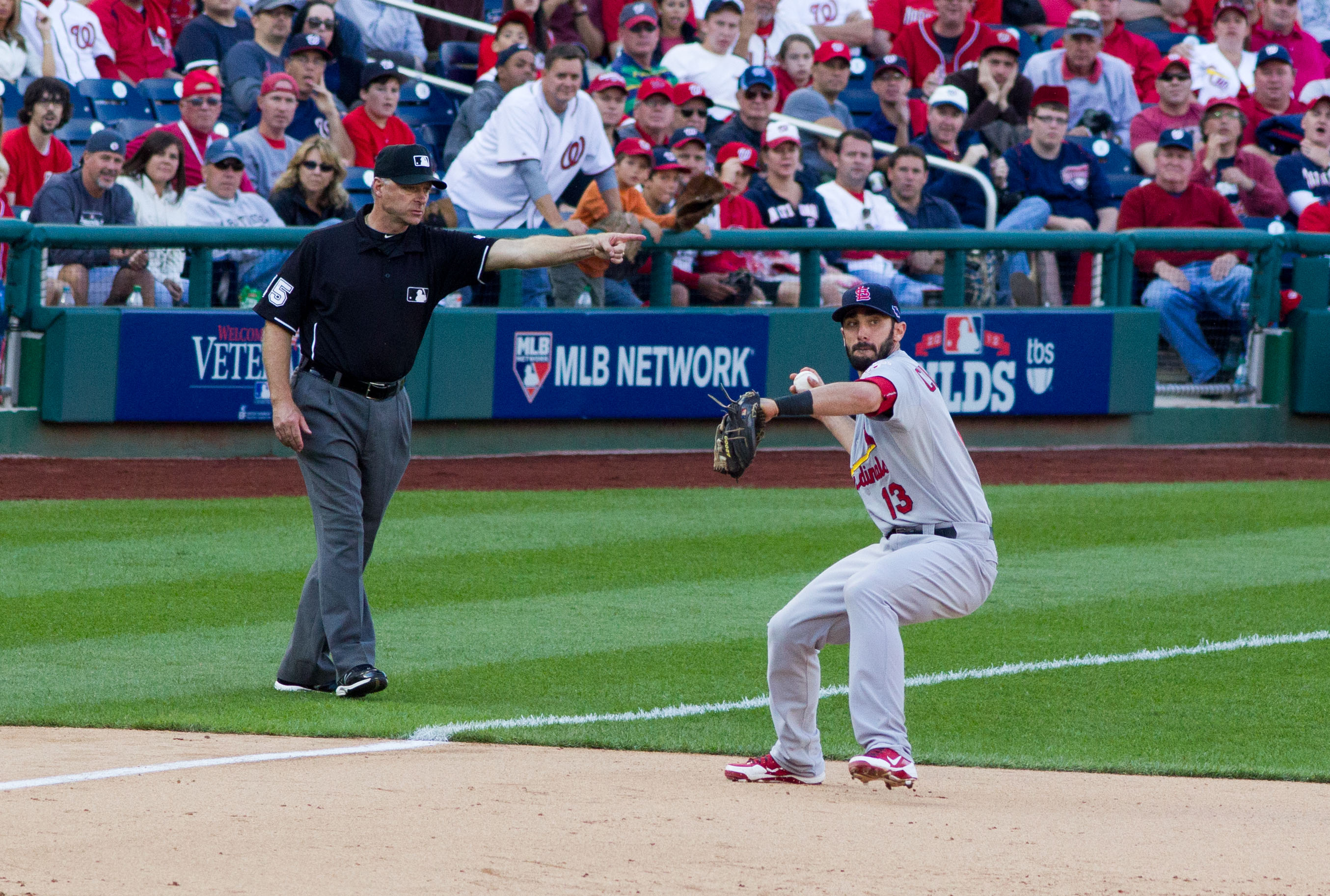
The St. Louis Cardinals selected Matt Carpenter in the 13th round. Carpenter is a 3× All-Star and won the 2013 Silver Slugger Award for second base.

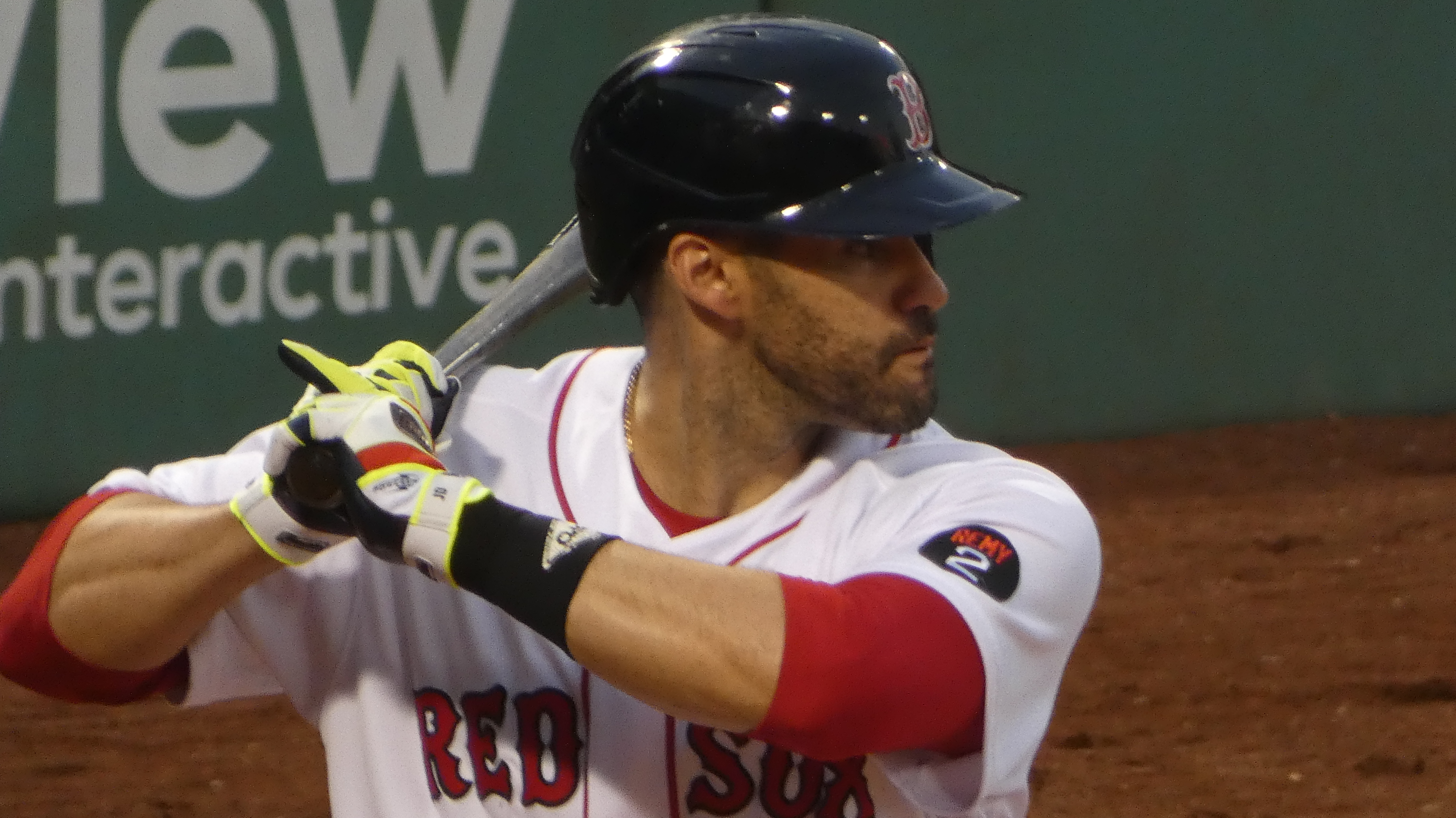
The Houston Astros selected J. D. Martinez in the 20th round. Martinez is a 6× All-Star and 3× Silver Slugger.

As of September 2, 2019

Round	Pick	Player	Team	Position	School
2	50	Jeff Kobernus	Washington Nationals	Second baseman	California
2	53	Brooks Pounders	Pittsburgh Pirates	Pitcher	Temecula Valley High School (CA)
2	54	Mychal Givens	Baltimore Orioles	Shortstop	Henry B. Plant High School (FL)
2	55	Tommy Joseph	San Francisco Giants	Catcher	Horizon High School (AZ)
2	56	Blake Smith	Los Angeles Dodgers	Outfielder	California
2	57	Billy Hamilton	Cincinnati Reds	Shortstop	Taylorsville High School (MS)
2	58	Andy Oliver	Detroit Tigers	Left-handed pitcher	Oklahoma State
2	59	Nolan Arenado	Colorado Rockies	Third baseman	El Toro High School (CA)
2	61	Trayce Thompson	Chicago White Sox	Outfielder	Santa Margarita Catholic High School (CA)
2	63	Jason Kipnis	Cleveland Indians	Outfielder	Arizona State
2	64	Marc Krauss	Arizona Diamondbacks	Outfielder	Ohio
2	67	Robert Stock	St. Louis Cardinals	Catcher	USC
2	71	David Holmberg	Chicago White Sox	Left-handed pitcher	Port Charlotte High School (FL)
2	72	Steven Matz	New York Mets	Left-handed pitcher	Ward Melville High School (NY)
2	76	John Ryan Murphy	New York Yankees	Catcher	IMG Academy (FL)
2	77	Alex Wilson	Boston Red Sox	Right-handed pitcher	Texas A&M
2	79	DJ LeMahieu	Chicago Cubs	Infielder	LSU
2	80	Patrick Corbin	Los Angeles Angels of Anaheim	Left-handed pitcher	Chipola College
3	82	Kyle Seager	Seattle Mariners	Second baseman	North Carolina
3	86	Chris Dominguez	San Francisco Giants	Third baseman	Louisville
3	87	David Hale	Atlanta Braves	Right-handed pitcher	Princeton
3	88	Donnie Joseph	Cincinnati Reds	Left-handed pitcher	Houston
3	90	Ben Paulsen	Colorado Rockies	First baseman	Clemson
3	91	Wil Myers	Kansas City Royals	Catcher	Wesleyan Christian Academy (NC)
3	92	Justin Marks	Oakland Athletics	Left-handed pitcher	Louisville
3	93	Robbie Erlin	Texas Rangers	Left-handed pitcher	Scotts Valley High School (CA)
3	95	Keon Broxton	Arizona Diamondbacks	Third baseman	Santa Fe College
3	98	Joe Kelly	St. Louis Cardinals	Right-handed pitcher	UC Riverside
3	99	Jake Barrett*	Toronto Blue Jays	Right-handed pitcher	Desert Ridge High School (AZ)
3	104	Jake Marisnick	Toronto Blue Jays	Outfielder	Riverside Polytechnic High School (CA)
3	105	Josh Prince	Milwaukee Brewers	Shortstop	Tulane
3	110	Josh Spence*	Los Angeles Angels of Anaheim	Left-handed pitcher	Arizona State
4	112	A. J. Morris	Washington Nationals	Right-handed pitcher	Kansas State
4	113	James Jones	Seattle Mariners	Outfielder	LIU Brooklyn
4	114	Keyvius Sampson	San Diego Padres	Right-handed pitcher	Forest High School (FL)
4	122	Chris Dwyer	Kansas City Royals	Left-handed pitcher	Clemson
4	123	Max Stassi	Oakland Athletics	Catcher	Yuba City High School (CA)
4	130	Ryan Goins	Toronto Blue Jays	Shortstop	Dallas Baptist
4	134	Darrell Ceciliani	New York Mets	Outfielder	Columbia Basin College
4	135	Adam Warren	New York Yankees	Right-handed pitcher	North Carolina
4	138	Jeremy Hazelbaker	Boston Red Sox	Outfielder	Ball State
4	140	Chris Rusin	Chicago Cubs	Left-handed pitcher	Kentucky
5	146	Ashur Tolliver	Baltimore Orioles	Left-handed pitcher	Oklahoma City
5	147	Brandon Belt	San Francisco Giants	First baseman	Texas
5	152	Louis Coleman	Kansas City Royals	Right-handed pitcher	Louisiana State
5	155	Austin Adams	Cleveland Indians	Right-handed pitcher	Faulkner University
5	156	Ryan Wheeler	Arizona Diamondbacks	First baseman	Loyola Marymount
5	159	Ryan Jackson	St. Louis Cardinals	Shortstop	Miami (FL)
5	160	Ryan Schimpf	Toronto Blue Jays	Second baseman	Louisiana State
5	164	Damien Magnifico*	New York Mets	Right-handed pitcher	North Mesquite High School (TX)
5	165	Caleb Cotham	New York Yankees	Right-handed pitcher	Vanderbilt
6	172	Michael Taylor	Washington Nationals	Shortstop	Westminster Academy (FL)
6	175	Zach Von Rosenberg	Pittsburgh Pirates	Right-handed pitcher	Zachary High School (LA)
6	180	Daniel Fields	Detroit Tigers	Shortstop	University of Detroit Jesuit High School (MI)
6	186	Bradin Hagens	Arizona Diamondbacks	Right-handed pitcher	Merced College
6	191	Enrique Hernández	Houston Astros	Shortstop	American Military Academy (PR)
6	192	Chris Herrmann	Minnesota Twins	Catcher	Miami (FL)
6	194	David Buchanan*	New York Mets	Right-handed pitcher	Chipola College
6	196	Hiram Burgos	Milwaukee Brewers	Right-handed pitcher	Bethune-Cookman
6	198	Branden Kline*	Boston Red Sox	Right-handed pitcher	Governor Thomas Johnson High School (MD)
6	200	Brooks Raley	Chicago Cubs	Left-handed pitcher	Texas A&M
7	204	Miles Mikolas	San Diego Padres	Right-handed pitcher	Nova Southeastern
7	212	Buddy Baumann	Kansas City Royals	Left-handed pitcher	Missouri State
7	213	Ian Krol	Oakland Athletics	Left-handed pitcher	Neuqua Valley High School (IL)
7	221	Dallas Keuchel	Houston Astros	Left-handed pitcher	Arkansas
7	226	Khris Davis	Milwaukee Brewers	Outfielder	Cal State Fullerton
7	228	Madison Younginer	Boston Red Sox	Right-handed pitcher	Mauldin High School (SC)
8	234	Nate Freiman	San Diego Padres	First baseman	Duke
8	241	Rob Scahill	Colorado Rockies	Right-handed pitcher	Bradley
8	245	Cory Burns	Colorado Rockies	Right-handed pitcher	Arizona
8	246	Paul Goldschmidt	Arizona Diamondbacks	First baseman	Texas State
8	252	Brian Dozier	Minnesota Twins	Shortstop	Southern Miss
8	257	Jon Singleton	Philadelphia Phillies	First baseman	Millikan High School (CA)
9	262	Taylor Jordan	Washington Nationals	Right-handed pitcher	Eastern Florida State College
9	265	Brock Holt	Pittsburgh Pirates	Second baseman	Rice
9	274	Jabari Blash*	Texas Rangers	Outfielder	Miami Dade College
9	275	Preston Guilmet	Cleveland Indians	Right-handed pitcher	Arizona
9	276	Chase Anderson	Arizona Diamondbacks	Right-handed pitcher	Oklahoma
9	280	Aaron Loup	Toronto Blue Jays	Left-handed pitcher	Tulane
9	287	Aaron Altherr	Philadelphia Phillies	Outfielder	Agua Fria High School (AZ)
9	291	David Carpenter	Los Angeles Angels of Anaheim	Right-handed pitcher	Paris Junior College
10	299	Tucker Barnhart	Cincinnati Reds	Catcher	Brownsburg High School (IN)
10	303	Sam Dyson*	Oakland Athletics	Right-handed pitcher	South Carolina
10	310	Yan Gomes	Toronto Blue Jays	Catcher	Barry University
10	315	Tyler Lyons*	New York Yankees	Left-handed pitcher	Oklahoma State
10	317	Josh Zeid	Philadelphia Phillies	Right-handed pitcher	Tulane
11	326	Mike Ohlman	Baltimore Orioles	Catcher	Lakewood Ranch High School (FL)
11	330	Adam Wilk	Detroit Tigers	Left-handed pitcher	Long Beach State
12	352	Nate Karns	Washington Nationals	Right-handed pitcher	Texas Tech
12	357	Chris Heston	San Francisco Giants	Right-handed pitcher	East Carolina
12	365	Joe Colón	Cleveland Indians	Right-handed pitcher	Huertas Junior College (PR)
12	366	Charles Brewer	Arizona Diamondbacks	Right-handed pitcher	UCLA
12	368	Kyle Jensen	Florida Marlins	Outfielder	St. Mary's (CA)
12	379	Andrew Bellatti	Tampa Bay Rays	Right-handed pitcher	Steele Canyon High School (CA)
13	386	Ty Kelly	Baltimore Orioles	Second baseman	UC Davis
13	389	Nick Christiani	Cincinnati Reds	Right-handed pitcher	Vanderbilt
13	392	Lane Adams	Kansas City Royals	Outfielder	Red Oak High School (OK)
13	393	Murphy Smith	Oakland Athletics	Right-handed pitcher	Binghamton
13	396	Patrick Schuster	Arizona Diamondbacks	Left-handed pitcher	J. W. Mitchell High School (FL)
13	399	Matt Carpenter	St. Louis Cardinals	Third baseman	Texas Christian
13	401	Jake Goebbert	Houston Astros	Outfielder	Northwestern
13	406	Sean Halton	Milwaukee Brewers	First baseman	Lewis–Clark State College
13	408	Chris McGuiness	Boston Red Sox	First baseman	The Citadel
14	414	Nick Greenwood	San Diego Padres	Left-handed pitcher	Rhode Island
14	424	Chad Bell	Texas Rangers	Left-handed pitcher	Walters State Community College
14	441	Sam Selman*	Los Angeles Angels of Anaheim	Left-handed pitcher	St. Andrew's Episcopal School (TX)
15	459	David Washington	St. Louis Cardinals	First baseman	University City High School (CA)
15	460	Drew Hutchison	Toronto Blue Jays	Right-handed pitcher	Lakeland Senior High School (FL)
15	465	Shane Greene	New York Yankees	Right-handed pitcher	Daytona State College
15	469	Pierce Johnson*	Tampa Bay Rays	Right-handed pitcher	Faith Christian Academy (CO)
16	475	Matt den Dekker*	Pittsburgh Pirates	Outfielder	Florida
16	495	Bryan Mitchell	New York Yankees	Right-handed pitcher	Rockingham County High School (NC)
16	496	Scooter Gennett	Milwaukee Brewers	Shortstop	Sarasota High School (FL)
16	497	Andrew Susac*	Philadelphia Phillies	Catcher	Jesuit High School (CA)
16	498	Luke Bard*	Boston Red Sox	Right-handed pitcher	Charlotte Christian School (NC)
17	509	Deven Marrero*	Cincinnati Reds	Shortstop	American Heritage School (FL)
17	517	Steve Ames	Los Angeles Dodgers	Right-handed pitcher	Gonzaga
17	523	Brian Goodwin*	Chicago White Sox	Outfielder	Rocky Mount High School (NC)
17	526	Tyler Cravy	Milwaukee Brewers	Right-handed pitcher	Napa Valley College
18	532	Marcus Stroman*	Washington Nationals	Shortstop	Patchogue-Medford High School (NY)
18	533	Anthony Vasquez	Seattle Mariners	Left-handed pitcher	Southern California
18	550	Daniel Webb	Toronto Blue Jays	Right-handed pitcher	Northwest Florida State College
18	556	Caleb Thielbar	Milwaukee Brewers	Left-handed pitcher	South Dakota State
19	571	Dustin Garneau	Colorado Rockies	Catcher	Cal State Fullerton
19	579	Travis Tartamella	St. Louis Cardinals	Catcher	Cal State Los Angeles
19	580	Ryan Tepera	Toronto Blue Jays	Right-handed pitcher	Sam Houston State
20	611	J. D. Martinez	Houston Astros	Outfielder	Nova Southeastern
20	617	Darin Ruf	Philadelphia Phillies	First baseman	Creighton
20	618	Alex Hassan	Boston Red Sox	First baseman	Duke
20	619	Dylan Floro*	Tampa Bay Rays	Right-handed pitcher	Buhach Colony High School (CA)
21	625	Phil Irwin	Pittsburgh Pirates	Right-handed pitcher	Ole Miss
21	630	Giovanni Soto	Detroit Tigers	Left-handed pitcher	None
21	638	A. J. Ramos	Florida Marlins	Right-handed pitcher	Texas Tech
21	639	Trevor Rosenthal	St. Louis Cardinals	Right-handed pitcher	Cowley College
22	653	Drew Hayes*	Seattle Mariners	Right-handed pitcher	Vanderbilt
22	654	Cody Decker	San Diego Padres	First baseman	UCLA
22	658	Ryan Weber	Atlanta Braves	Right-handed pitcher	St. Petersburg College
22	662	Ryan Dennick	Kansas City Royals	Left-handed pitcher	Tennessee Tech
22	665	Merrill Kelly*	Cleveland Indians	Right-handed pitcher	Yavapai College
22	676	Mike Fiers	Milwaukee Brewers	Right-handed pitcher	Nova Southeastern
23	683	David Rollins*	Seattle Mariners	Left-handed pitcher	San Jacinto College
23	699	Matt Adams	St. Louis Cardinals	First baseman	Slippery Rock (PA)
23	700	Brad Glenn	Toronto Blue Jays	Outfielder	Arizona
24	723	Dan Straily	Oakland Athletics	Right-handed pitcher	Marshall
24	728	Michael Brady	Florida Marlins	Shortstop	California
24	729	Keith Butler	St. Louis Cardinals	Right-handed pitcher	Wabash Valley College
24	732	Mario Hollands*	Minnesota Twins	Left-handed pitcher	UC Santa Barbara
24	739	Andrew Heaney*	Tampa Bay Rays	Left-handed pitcher	Putnam City High School (OK)
25	757	Richie Shaffer*	Los Angeles Dodgers	Third baseman	Providence High School (NC)
25	770	Justin Bour	Chicago Cubs	First baseman	George Mason
26	775	Matt Dermody*	Pittsburgh Pirates	Left-handed pitcher	Norwalk High School (IA)
27	814	Aaron Barrett*	Texas Rangers	Right-handed pitcher	Ole Miss
27	815	Tyler Sturdevant	Cleveland Indians	Right-handed pitcher	New Mexico State
27	817	Brian Johnson*	Los Angeles Dodgers	Left-handed pitcher	Cocoa Beach High School (FL)
28	834	Vince Belnome	San Diego Padres	Second baseman	West Virginia
28	844	Derek Law*	Texas Rangers	Right-handed pitcher	Seton-La Salle Catholic High School (PA)
28	852	Pat Light*	Minnesota Twins	Right-handed pitcher	Christian Brothers Academy (NJ)
28	859	Zac Rosscup	Tampa Bay Rays	Left-handed pitcher	Chemeketa Community College
29	871	Corey Dickerson*	Colorado Rockies	Outfielder	Meridian Community College
29	873	Mike Zunino*	Oakland Athletics	Catcher	Mariner High School (FL)
30	893	Brandon Bantz	Seattle Mariners	Catcher	Dallas Baptist
31	944	Mitch Haniger*	New York Mets	Outfielder	Archbishop Mitty High School (CA)
32	960	Parker Markel*	Detroit Tigers	Right-handed pitcher	Mountain Ridge High School (AZ)
32	962	Luke Voit*	Kansas City Royals	Catcher	Lafayette High School (MO)
33	986	Tyler Naquin*	Baltimore Orioles	Outfielder	Klein Collins High School (TX)
33	987	Jake Dunning	San Francisco Giants	Right-handed pitcher	Indiana
33	993	Mike Bolsinger*	Oakland Athletics	Right-handed pitcher	Arkansas
34	1035	Jake Petricka*	New York Yankees	Right-handed pitcher	Indiana State
34	1037	A. J. Griffin*	Philadelphia Phillies	Right-handed pitcher	San Diego
35	1054	Eddie Butler*	Texas Rangers	Right-handed pitcher	Greenbrier Christian Academy (VA)
35	1055	Chris Beck*	Cleveland Indians	Right-handed pitcher	Jefferson High School (GA)
36	1084	Matt Carasiti*	Texas Rangers	Right-handed pitcher	Berlin High School (CT)
36	1086	Mike Freeman*	Arizona Diamondbacks	Shortstop	Clemson
36	1091	Tyler Saladino*	Houston Astros	Shortstop	Palomar College
36	1098	Mike Yastrzemski*	Boston Red Sox	Outfielder	St. John's Preparatory School (MA)
37	1106	Taylor Rogers*	Baltimore Orioles	Left-handed pitcher	Chatfield Senior High School (CO)
37	1107	Ryan Lollis	San Francisco Giants	Outfielder	Missouri
37	1128	Matt Koch*	Boston Red Sox	Right-handed pitcher	Washington High School (IA)
37	1129	Austin Maddox*	Tampa Bay Rays	Catcher	Eagle's View Academy (FL)
38	1135	Jake Lamb*	Pittsburgh Pirates	Third baseman	Bishop Blanchet High School (Washington
39	1162	Kyle Martin*	Washington Nationals	Right-handed pitcher	St. Michael's Catholic Academy (TX)
39	1180	Josh Lucas*	Toronto Blue Jays	Right-handed pitcher	Lakeland Senior High School (FL)
39	1186	Brady Rodgers*	Milwaukee Brewers	Right-handed pitcher	Lamar Consolidated High School (TX)
40	1202	Mike Morin*	Kansas City Royals	Right-handed pitcher	Shawnee Mission South High School (KS)
40	1219	James Pazos*	Tampa Bay Rays	Left-handed pitcher	Highland High School (AZ)
41	1235	Max Muncy*	Cleveland Indians	Catcher	Keller High School (TX)
41	1238	Darnell Sweeney*	Florida Marlins	Shortstop	American High School (FL)
42	1267	Tony Renda*	Los Angeles Dodgers	Shortstop	Junípero Serra High School (CA)
43	1283	Cameron Perkins*	Seattle Mariners	Outfielder	Southport High School (IN)
43	1308	Luke Maile*	Boston Red Sox	Catcher	Covington Catholic High School (KY)
44	1312	Hoby Milner*	Washington Nationals	Left-handed pitcher	R. L. Paschal High School (TX)
44	1328	Ken Giles*	Florida Marlins	Right-handed pitcher	Rio Grande High School (NM)
44	1333	Taylor Thompson	Chicago White Sox	Right-handed pitcher	Auburn
45	1357	Stephen Piscotty*	Los Angeles Dodgers	Outfielder	Amador Valley High School (CA)
46	1378	Buck Farmer*	Atlanta Braves	Right-handed pitcher	Rockdale County High School (GA)
48	1433	Sean Nolin*	Seattle Mariners	Left-handed pitcher	San Jacinto College
48	1445	Vidal Nuño	Cleveland Indians	Left-handed pitcher	Baker University
48	1451	Paco Rodriguez*	Houston Astros	Left-handed pitcher	Gulliver Preparatory School (FL)
48	1454	Joe Mantiply*	New York Mets	Left-handed pitcher	Tunstall High School (VA)
49	1475	Burch Smith*	Cleveland Indians	Right-handed pitcher	Howard College
49	1477	Christian Walker*	Los Angeles Dodgers	Third baseman	Kennedy-Kenrick Catholic High School (PA)
50	1498	Josh Edgin*	Atlanta Braves	Left-handed pitcher	Francis Marion University
50	1513	Kevin Chapman*	Chicago White Sox	Left-handed pitcher	Florida
50	1514	Zack Godley*	New York Mets	Right-handed pitcher	Bamberg-Ehrhardt High School (SC)

=== NFL players drafted ===
- Jake Locker, 10th round, 321st overall by the Los Angeles Angels of Anaheim, but did not sign
- Riley Cooper, 25th round, 754th overall by the Texas Rangers, but did not sign
- Eric Decker, 27th round, 822nd overall by the Minnesota Twins, but did not sign
- Jacobbi McDaniel, 33rd round, 1006th overall by the Milwaukee Brewers, but did not sign
- Colin Kaepernick, 43rd round, 1310th overall by the Chicago Cubs, but did not sign
- Anthony Scirrotto, 50th round, 1502nd overall by the Kansas City Royals, signed, but never played

Preceded by Tim Beckham	1st Overall Picks; Stephen Strasburg	Succeeded by Bryce Harper
