= List of Arizona Diamondbacks first-round draft picks =

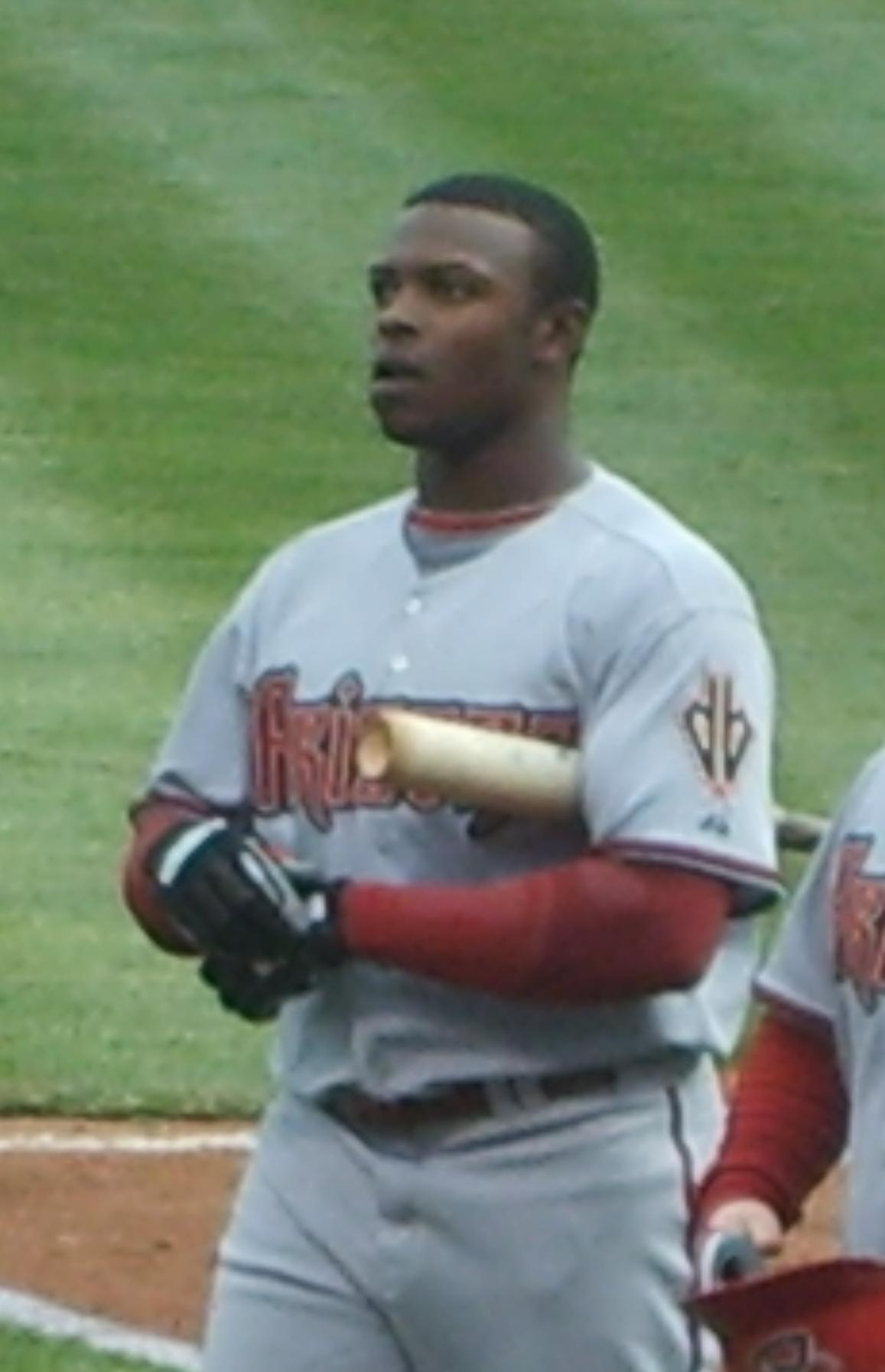
Justin Upton, the first overall selection in 2005, was named to the 2009 All-Star Team.

The Arizona Diamondbacks are a Major League Baseball franchise based in Phoenix, Arizona. The Diamondbacks compete in the National League West division. Officially known as the "First-Year Player Draft", the Rule 4 Draft is Major League Baseball's primary mechanism for assigning amateur baseball players from high schools, colleges, and other amateur baseball clubs to its teams. The draft order is determined based on the previous season's standings, with the team possessing the worst record receiving the first pick. In addition, teams which lost free agents in the previous off-season may be awarded compensatory or supplementary picks. Since the franchise first participated in the draft in 1996, the Diamondbacks have selected 28 players in the first round. The First-Year Player Draft is unrelated to the 1997 expansion draft in which the Diamondbacks filled their roster.

Of the 28 players picked in the first round by the Diamondbacks, 15 have been pitchers, the most of any position; 11 of these have been right-handed, while 4 have been left-handed. Five players taken in the first round have been shortstops; additionally, two players have been selected at each of first base, third base, catcher, and the outfield. No second baseman has been selected in the first round by the Diamondbacks. The Diamondbacks have drafted 16 players out of college, and 10 out of high school. Arizona has drafted seven players out of high schools or colleges in the state of California, with two being taken from each of Florida, Georgia, and their home state of Arizona.

The Diamondbacks' 2003 selection—Carlos Quentin, who was then playing with the Chicago White Sox—won the 2008 Silver Slugger Award as one of the three best offensive outfielders in the American League. The franchise has held the first-overall pick once, in 2005, when they selected Justin Upton. The Diamondbacks have received twelve compensatory picks, including nine selections made in the supplemental round of the draft since the franchise's first draft in 1996. These additional picks are provided when a team loses a particularly valuable free agent in the previous off-season,^{[V]} or, more recently, if a team fails to sign a draft pick from the previous year.

== Key ==
Year	Links to an article about that year's Major League Baseball draft
Position	Indicates the secondary/collegiate position at which the player was drafted, rather than the professional position the player may have gone on to play
Pick	Indicates the number of the pick
*	Player did not sign with the Diamondbacks
§	Indicates a supplemental pick

== Picks ==
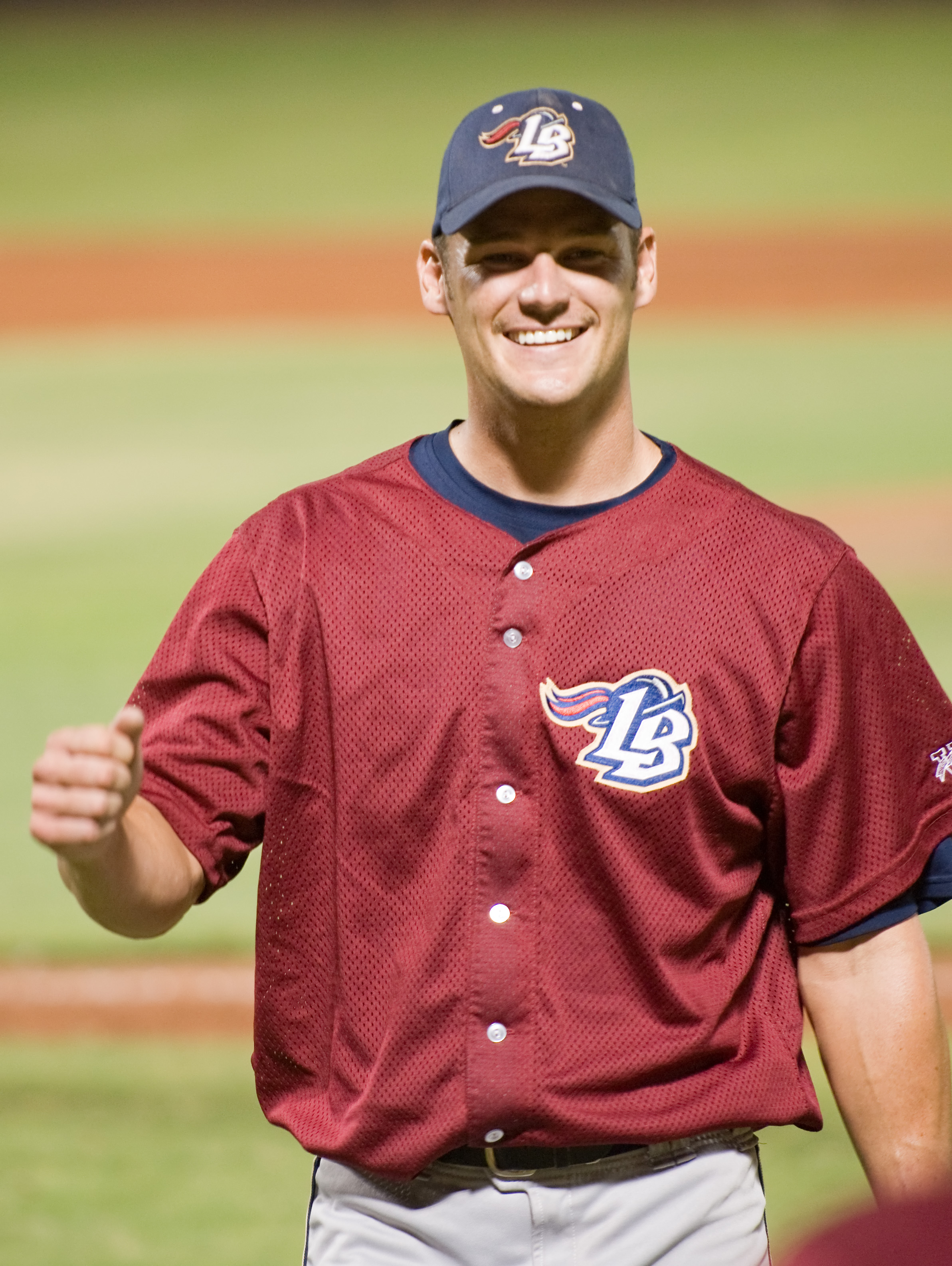
Nick Bierbrodt (1996) was the first player drafted in franchise history.

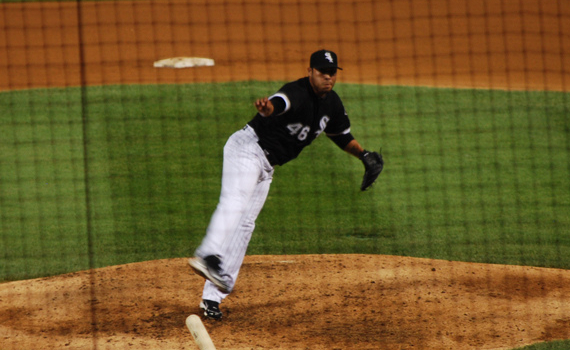
Sergio Santos (2002) was drafted as a shortstop, but later played as a pitcher.

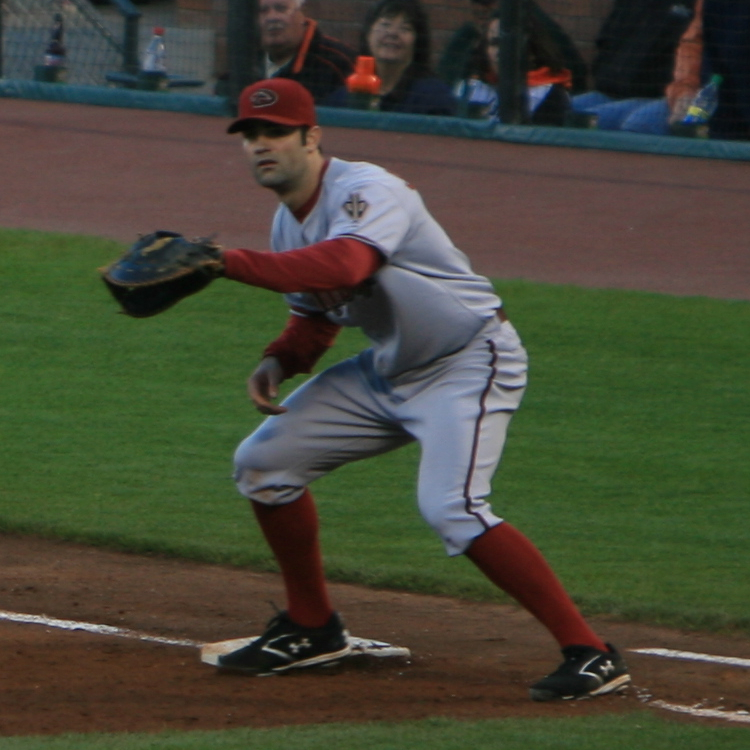
Conor Jackson (2003) is one of three first basemen selected by the Diamondbacks.

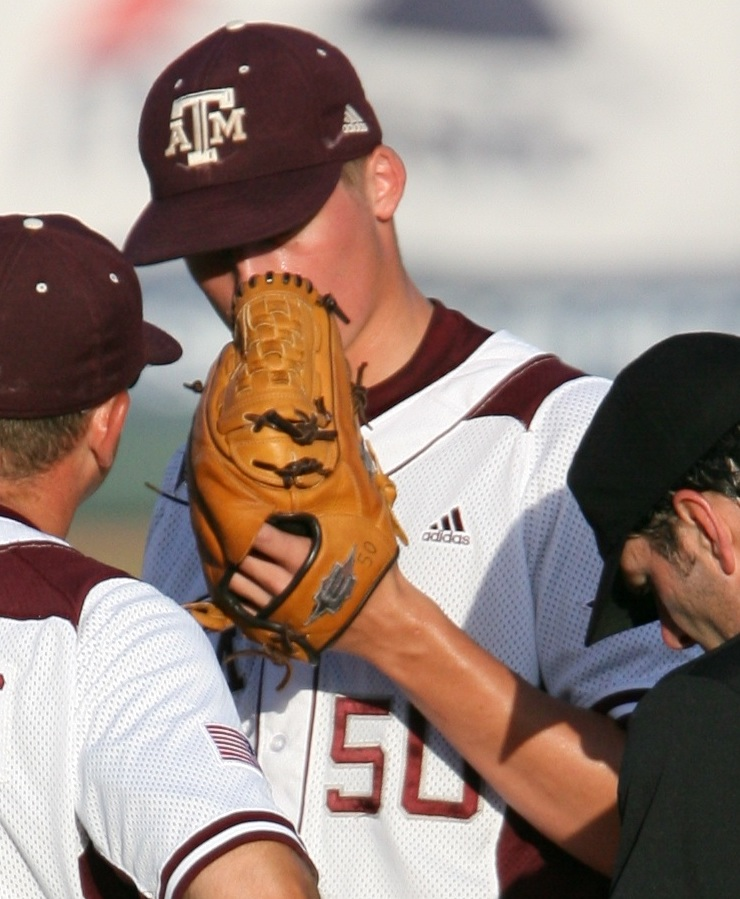
Barret Loux (2010) was the first player drafted by the Diamondbacks in the first round not to sign with the team.

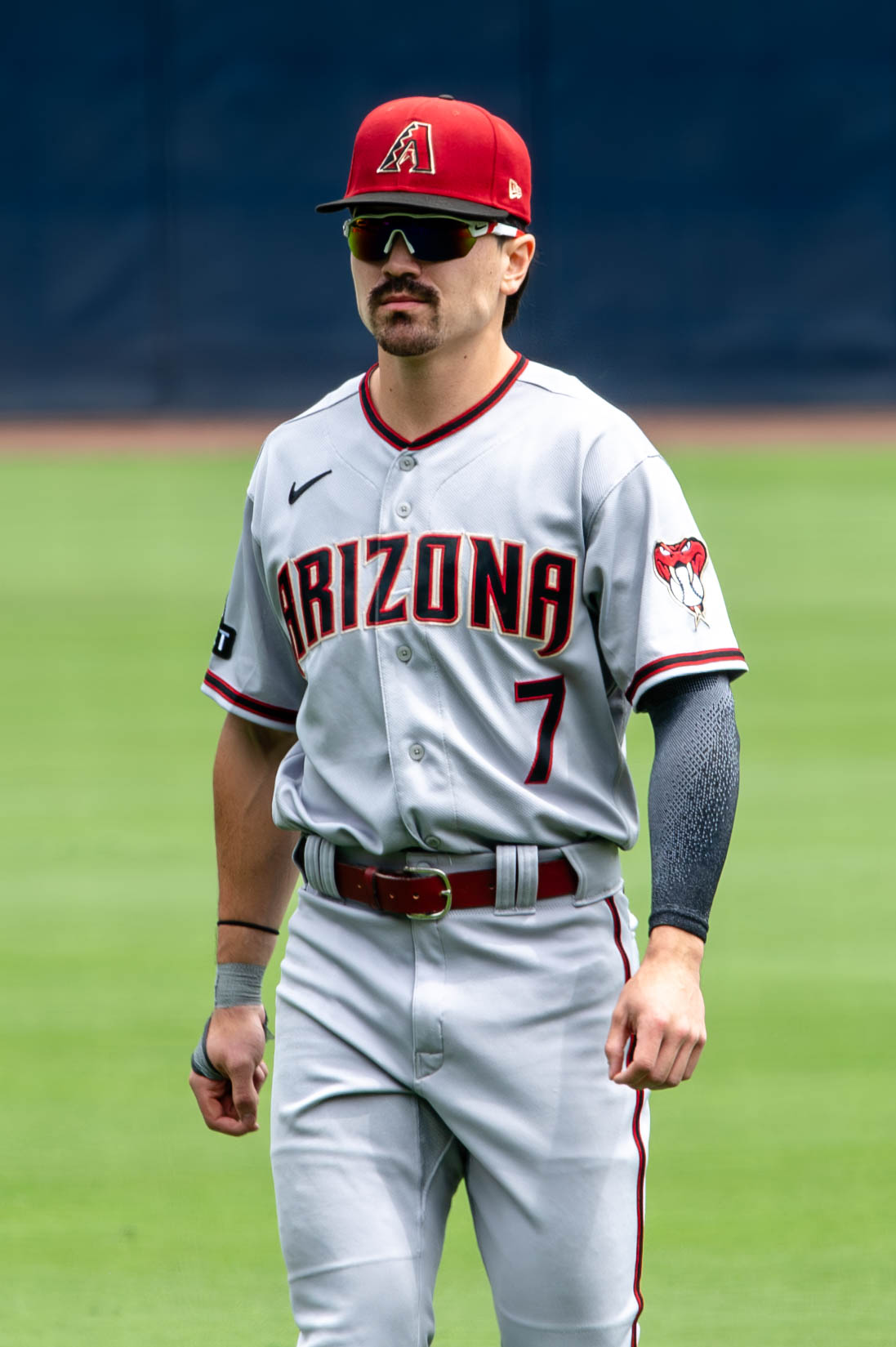
Corbin Carroll was the first of the team's two first-round picks in 2019.

Year	Name	Position	School (location)	Pick	Ref
1996	Nick Bierbrodt	Left-handed pitcher	Millikan High School (Long Beach, California)	30	
1997	Jack Cust	First baseman	Immaculata High School (Somerville, New Jersey)	30	
1998	no first-round pick^{[a]}				
1999	Corey Myers	Shortstop	Desert Vista High School (Phoenix, Arizona)	4	
1999	Casey Daigle	Right-handed pitcher	Sulphur High School (Sulphur, Louisiana)	31§^{[b]}	
2000	no first-round pick^{[c]}				
2001	Jason Bulger	Right-handed pitcher	Valdosta State University (Valdosta, Georgia)	22	
2002	Sergio Santos	Shortstop	Mater Dei High School (Santa Ana, California)	27	
2003	Conor Jackson	First baseman	University of California, Berkeley (Berkeley, California)	19^{[d]}	
2003	Carlos Quentin	Outfielder	Stanford University (Stanford, California)	29	
2004	Stephen Drew	Shortstop	Florida State University (Tallahassee, Florida)	15	
2005	Justin Upton	Shortstop	Great Bridge High School (Chesapeake, Virginia)	1	
2005	Matt Torra	Right-handed pitcher	University of Massachusetts Amherst (Amherst, Massachusetts)	31§^{[e]}	
2006	Max Scherzer	Right-handed pitcher	University of Missouri (Columbia, Missouri)	11	
2006	Brooks Brown	Right-handed pitcher	University of Georgia (Athens, Georgia)	34§^{[f]}	
2007	Jarrod Parker	Right-handed pitcher	Norwell High School (Ossian, Indiana)	9	
2007	Wes Roemer	Right-handed pitcher	California State University, Fullerton (Fullerton, California)	50§^{[g]}	
2007	Ed Easley	Catcher	Mississippi State University (Starkville, Mississippi)	61§^{[h]}	
2008	Daniel Schlereth	Left-handed pitcher	University of Arizona (Tucson, Arizona)	26	
2008	Wade Miley	Left-handed pitcher	Southeastern Louisiana University (Hammond, Louisiana)	43§^{[i]}	
2009	Robert Borchering	Third baseman	Bishop Verot High School (Fort Myers, Florida)	16	
2009	A.J. Pollock	Outfielder	University of Notre Dame (South Bend, Indiana)	17^{[j]}	
2009	Matthew Davidson	Third baseman	Yucaipa High School (Yucaipa, California)	35§^{[k]}	
2009	Chris Owings	Shortstop	Gilbert High School (Gilbert, South Carolina)	41§^{[l]}	
2009	Michael Belfiore	Left-handed pitcher	Boston College (Chestnut Hill, Massachusetts)	45§^{[m]}	
2010	Barret Loux*	Right-handed pitcher	Texas A&M University (College Station, Texas)	6	
2011	Trevor Bauer	Right-handed pitcher	University of California, Los Angeles (Los Angeles, California)	3	
2011	Archie Bradley	Right-handed pitcher	Broken Arrow Senior High (Broken Arrow, Oklahoma)	7^{[n]}	
2012	Stryker Trahan	Catcher	Acadiana High School (Lafayette, Louisiana)	26	
2013	Braden Shipley	Right-handed pitcher	University of Nevada, Reno (Reno, Nevada)	15	
2014	Touki Toussaint	Right-handed pitcher	Coral Springs Christian Academy (Coral Springs, Florida)	16	
2015	Dansby Swanson	Shortstop	Vanderbilt University (Nashville, Tennessee)	1	
2016	Anfernee Grier	Outfielder	Auburn University (Auburn, Alabama)	39	
2017	Pavin Smith	First Baseman	University of Virginia (Charlottesville, Virginia)	7	
2018	Matt McLain*	Second Baseman	Beckman High School (Irvine, California)	25	
2019	Corbin Carroll	Outfielder	Lakeside School (Seattle, Washington)	16	
2019	Blake Walston	Left-handed Pitcher	New Hanover High School (Wilmington, North Carolina)	26	
2020	Bryce Jarvis	Right-handed pitcher	Duke University (Durham, North Carolina)	18	
2021	Jordan Lawlar	Shortstop	Dallas Jesuit College Prep (Dallas, Texas)	6	
2022	Druw Jones	Outfielder	Wesleyan School (Peachtree Corners, Georgia)	2	
2022	Landon Sims	Right-Handed pitcher	Mississippi State University (Starkville, Mississippi)	34	
2023	Tommy Troy	Shortstop	Stanford University (Stanford, California)	12	
2024	Slade Caldwell	Outfielder	Valley View High School (Jonesboro, Arkansas)	29	
2025	Kayson Cunningham	Shortstop	Lady Bird Johnson High School (San Antonio, Texas)	18	
2025	Patrick Forbes	Right-handed pitcher	University of Louisville (Louisville, Kentucky)	29§	
2026	Ryder Helfrick	Catcher	University of Arkansas (Fayetteville, Arkansas)	15	
2026	Blake Bryant	Right-handed pitcher	Citizens Christian Academy (Douglas, Georgia)	31§	

== See also ==
- Arizona Diamondbacks minor league players

== Footnotes ==
- ^{V} Through the 2012 draft, free agents were evaluated by the Elias Sports Bureau and rated "Type A", "Type B", or not compensation-eligible. If a team offered arbitration to a player but that player refused and subsequently signed with another team, the original team was able to receive additional draft picks. If a "Type A" free agent left in this way, his previous team received a supplemental pick and a compensatory pick from the team with which he signed. If a "Type B" free agent left in this way, his previous team received only a supplemental pick. Since the 2013 draft, free agents are no longer classified by type; instead, compensatory picks are only awarded if the team offered its free agent a contract worth at least the average of the 125 current richest MLB contracts. However, if the free agent's last team acquired the player in a trade during the last year of his contract, it is ineligible to receive compensatory picks for that player.
- ^{a} The Diamondbacks lost their first-round pick in 1998 to the Kansas City Royals as compensation for signing free agent Jay Bell.
- ^{b} The Diamondbacks gained a supplemental first-round pick in 1999 for losing free agent Devon White.
- ^{c} The Diamondbacks lost their first-round pick in 2000 to the Atlanta Braves as compensation for signing free agent Russ Springer.
- ^{d} The Diamondbacks gained a compensatory first-round pick in 2003 from the Seattle Mariners for losing free agent Greg Colbrunn.
- ^{e} The Diamondbacks gained a supplemental first-round pick in 2005 for losing free agent Richie Sexson.
- ^{f} The Diamondbacks gained a supplemental first-round pick in 2006 for losing free agent Tim Worrell.
- ^{g} The Diamondbacks gained a supplemental first-round pick in 2007 for losing free agent Craig Counsell.
- ^{h} The Diamondbacks gained a supplemental first-round pick in 2007 for losing free agent Miguel Batista.
- ^{i} The Diamondbacks gained a supplemental first-round pick in 2008 for losing free agent Liván Hernández.
- ^{j} The Diamondbacks gained a compensatory first-round pick in 2009 from the Los Angeles Dodgers for losing free agent Orlando Hudson.
- ^{k} The Diamondbacks gained a supplemental first-round pick in 2009 for losing free agent Orlando Hudson.
- ^{l} The Diamondbacks gained a supplemental first-round pick in 2009 for losing free agent Juan Cruz.
- ^{m} The Diamondbacks gained a supplemental first-round pick in 2009 for losing free agent Brandon Lyon.
- ^{n} The Diamondbacks gained a compensatory first-round pick in 2011 for failing to sign 2010 first-round pick Barret Loux.
