= Nolan Reimold =

American baseball player (born 1983)

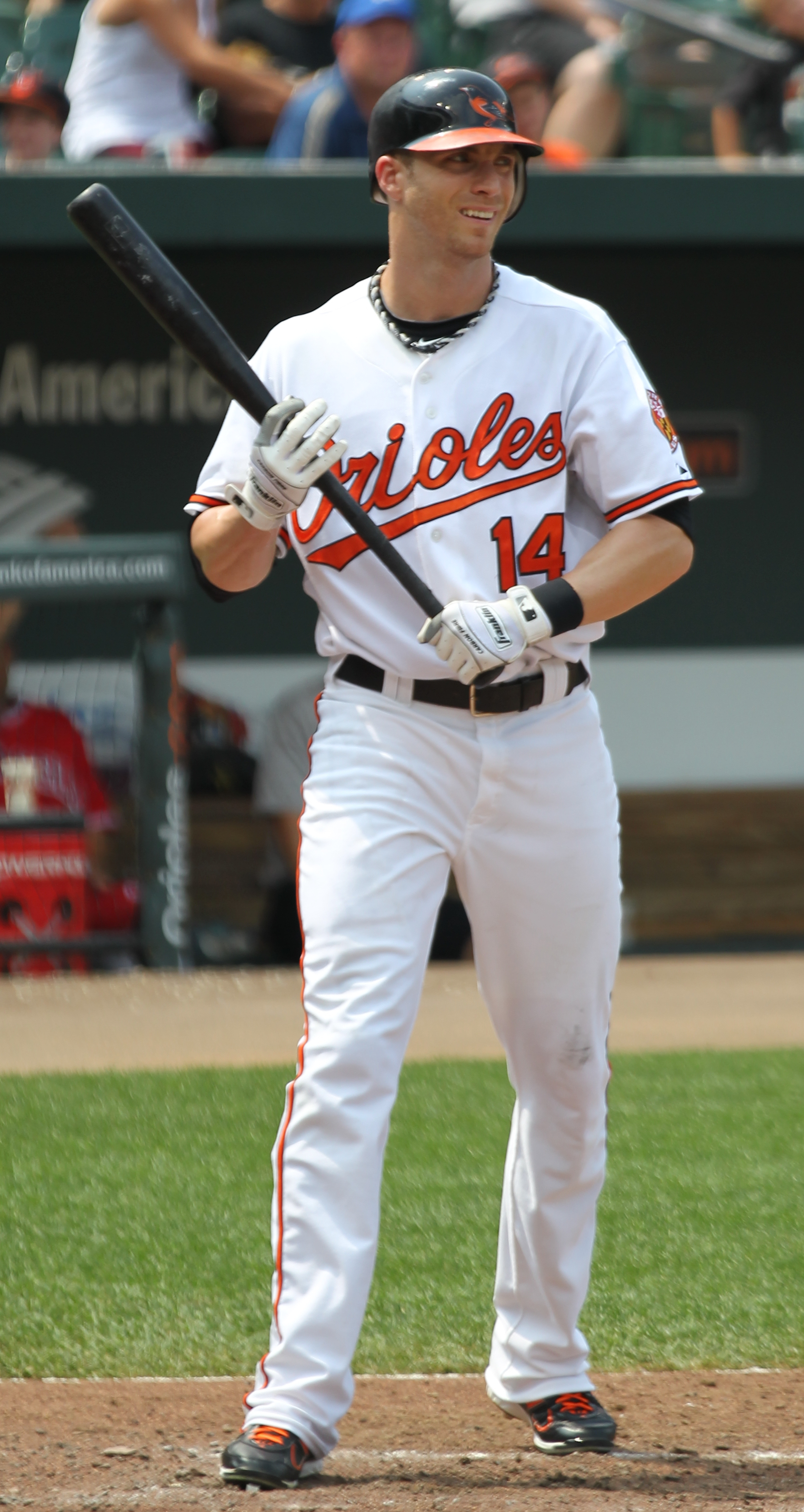
- Reimold with the Baltimore Orioles in 2011
- Left fielder
- Born: October 12, 1983 (age 42); Greenville, Pennsylvania, U.S.
- Batted: Right Threw: Right

MLB debut
- May 14, 2009, for the Baltimore Orioles

Last MLB appearance
- October 1, 2016, for the Baltimore Orioles

MLB statistics
- Batting average: .246
- Home runs: 56
- Runs batted in: 174
- Stats at Baseball Reference

Teams
- Baltimore Orioles (2009–2013); Toronto Blue Jays (2014); Arizona Diamondbacks (2014); Baltimore Orioles (2015–2016)

Nolan Gallagher Reimold (born October 12, 1983) is an American former professional baseball outfielder and designated hitter who played in Major League Baseball (MLB) for the Baltimore Orioles, Toronto Blue Jays, and Arizona Diamondbacks.

== Early life ==
Reimold was born to John and Mary Reimold on October 12, 1983, in Greenville, Pennsylvania. He attended Kennedy Catholic High School in Hermitage, Pennsylvania. In addition to baseball, he was also on the basketball team in a traditional football-heavy stronghold of Western Pennsylvania.

Reimold attended Bowling Green State University in Bowling Green, Ohio, the same as former Bowie Baysox teammate Jeff Hundley and Major League relief pitcher Burke Badenhop. Reimold currently holds the career records at Bowling Green State University for home runs and runs batted in (RBI). Reimold was an all Mid-American Conference outfielder in 2004, and a 3rd-team All American as a designated hitter in 2005. He was named National Hitter of the Week on March 28, 2005. He led the Mid-American Conference (MAC) in home runs (20), RBIs (60), total bases (137), on-base percentage (.496), and slugging percentage (.770) throughout the 2005 regular season, only to be second in batting (.360) behind fellow Falcon teammate, Andy Hudak.

== Career ==
=== Baltimore Orioles ===
Reimold was drafted by the Baltimore Orioles as their 2nd round pick (61st overall) in the 2005 MLB draft. He became the fourth highest Falcon ever drafted and just the third Falcon drafted in the top two rounds. He also became first Falcon ever to be named All-America by three different outlets in one season which were the NCBWA Second Team, ABCA Third Team, Baseball America Third Team. After signing, he played for the Aberdeen IronBirds and Frederick Keys, and was a New York–Penn League All-Star for the IronBirds. He continued to play with the Frederick Keys for the 2006 season, and was the MVP for the Carolina League's all-star game. He started the 2007 season with the Bowie Baysox but was sidelined shortly thereafter with an oblique strain. After a brief rehab stint with the Gulf Coast Orioles, Reimold returned to the Baysox to finish the rest of the season.

==== 2008 ====
Reimold continued playing for the Baysox for the 2008 season, and was named an Eastern League post-season all-star. In game two of Bowie's match-up with the Akron Aeros in the first round of the Eastern League playoffs, Reimold hit three home runs for the first time in his career en route to finishing 4-for-5 with eight RBI.

Reimold played for the Surprise Rafters in the Arizona Fall League during the 2008 Winter Baseball season. Baseball America named him the 5th-best prospect in the Orioles' farm system for the 2009 season.

==== 2009 ====
Reimold reported to the Norfolk Tides, the Orioles' Triple-A team to begin the 2009 season, and was recalled to the major league club on May 14 collecting his first major league hit that night off Ron Mahay, then would collect his first major league RBI and double, both off Royals pitcher Kyle Davies on May 16. Reimold hit his first career home run on May 20, 2009, against the New York Yankees at Yankee Stadium off Mariano Rivera. On May 27, 2009, Reimold hit his first walk off home run against the Toronto Blue Jays in the 11th inning to give the Orioles a 12–10 victory.

Nolan won the American League Rookie of the Month award for June 2009.

On September 18, the Orioles decided to shut down Reimold for the rest of the season due to fraying in his left Achilles tendon. The surgery was successful to repair the Achilles, but the rehab was not complete until late in the 2010 year, causing many of his future issues.

==== 2010 ====
Reimold started the season with the Baltimore as the team's starting left fielder. After a slow start in his first 83 at-bats, Reimold was demoted back to Norfolk on May 12, 2010, where the coaching staff was retooling him to play first base. During that time, the Orioles released their starting first baseman Garrett Atkins, with speculation that it would allow Reimold to rejoin the Orioles after the All-Star Break. Instead, Reimold spent most of the year in Norfolk, not returning to the big leagues until September.

==== 2011 ====
Reimold had a successful 2011 campaign with most of his playing time in left field after Luke Scott tore his labrum and Félix Pie was sent down to the minor leagues. In the season finale against the visiting Boston Red Sox, he tied the game on an RBI double and crossed the plate for the game-winning run. The loss, coupled with the walk-off win by the Tampa Bay Rays minutes later, eliminated the Red Sox from playoff contention.

==== 2012 ====
Reimold started the 2012 season strong playing in left field, hitting .313 with five home runs and 10 RBI in his first 16 games, but was plagued by injuries, including a herniated cervical disk, that put him on the disabled list after April 30. He was moved to the 60-day disabled list on June 12. On June 22, it was announced Reimold would undergo surgery to repair the disk in his neck, which ended his season.

==== 2013 ====
Reimold struggled in 2013, dealing with more injuries and batting .195 with five home runs and 12 RBI in 40 games. In order to fix the procedure performed the previous June, he was once again forced to undergo season-ending corrective surgery after limited playing time.

After the season, Reimold signed a one-year contract with the Orioles, promising him just over $1 million for the 2014 season while avoiding arbitration.

Reimold was designated for assignment by the Orioles on July 1, 2014.

=== Toronto Blue Jays ===
Reimold was claimed off waivers by the Toronto Blue Jays on July 6, 2014. After four games played with the Blue Jays, in which he batted .333 with three RBI, Reimold was placed on the 15-day disabled list with a left calf strain on July 12. On July 31, Reimold went 2-for-4, including two home runs, against the Houston Astros to lead the Blue Jays to a 6–5 victory. He was designated for assignment on August 26 when Kevin Pillar was recalled.

=== Arizona Diamondbacks ===
On August 28, 2014, Reimold was claimed off waivers by the Arizona Diamondbacks. In seven appearances for the Diamondbacks, Reimold batted .294/.278/.529 with one home run and four RBI.

=== Baltimore Orioles (second stint) ===
==== 2015 ====
On February 3, 2015, Reimold signed a minor league contract with the Baltimore Orioles that included an invitation to spring training. Reimold was assigned to Triple-A Norfolk Tides to begin the regular season. On June 8, the Orioles recalled Reimold from Norfolk. He was designated for assignment on August 24, and brought back up on September 6. In 61 total appearances for Baltimore, Reimold batted .247/.344/.394 with six home runs and 20 RBI.

Reimold sued Johns Hopkins Hospital and his surgeon in Baltimore City Circuit Court for prematurely clearing him to play after his 2012 surgery. Hopkins settled the following year for an undisclosed sum.

==== 2016 ====
At the All-Star break, Reimold was hitting .268 (33-for-123) in 57 games with four home runs and 11 RBI. On July 24, Reimold hit his third career walk off home run off of Cleveland Indians pitcher Cody Allen to defeat the Indians 5–3. In 104 appearances for Baltimore, he batted .222/.300/.365 with six home runs and 15 RBI.

=== Long Island Ducks ===
On April 5, 2017, Reimold signed with the Long Island Ducks of the Atlantic League of Professional Baseball. He made 19 appearances for the Ducks, batting .238/.359/.397 with two home runs, seven RBI, and two stolen bases. On May 28, Reimold announced his retirement from professional baseball.

== Personal life ==
Reimold is married to Jennifer "Jenny" Reimold, a style expert for HomeGoods, and has seven children.
