= Matt Torra =

American baseball player (born 1984)

- Pitcher
- Born: June 29, 1984 (age 42); Pittsfield, Massachusetts, U.S.
- Batted: Right Threw: Right

CPBL debut
- July 18, 2013, for the EDA Rhinos

Last CPBL appearance
- October 2, 2013, for the EDA Rhinos

CPBL statistics
- Win–loss record: 6–3
- Earned run average: 2.77
- Strikeouts: 36
- Stats at Baseball Reference

Teams
- EDA Rhinos (2013)

Matthew T. Torra (born June 29, 1984) is an American former professional baseball pitcher. He played in the Chinese Professional Baseball League (CPBL) for the EDA Rhinos.

== Career ==
Torra attended Pittsfield High School and the University of Massachusetts Amherst, where he played college baseball for the UMass Minutemen. In 2004, he played collegiate summer baseball with the Orleans Cardinals of the Cape Cod Baseball League.

Torra was drafted by the Arizona Diamondbacks in the first round (31st overall) of the 2005 Major League Baseball draft. The Diamondbacks sold Torra to the Rays for cash considerations in 2011. The Rays invited Torra to spring training in 2012. He was signed to a minor league contract by the Nationals on December 28, 2012.
