= Félix Pie =

Haitian / Dominican baseball player (born 1985)

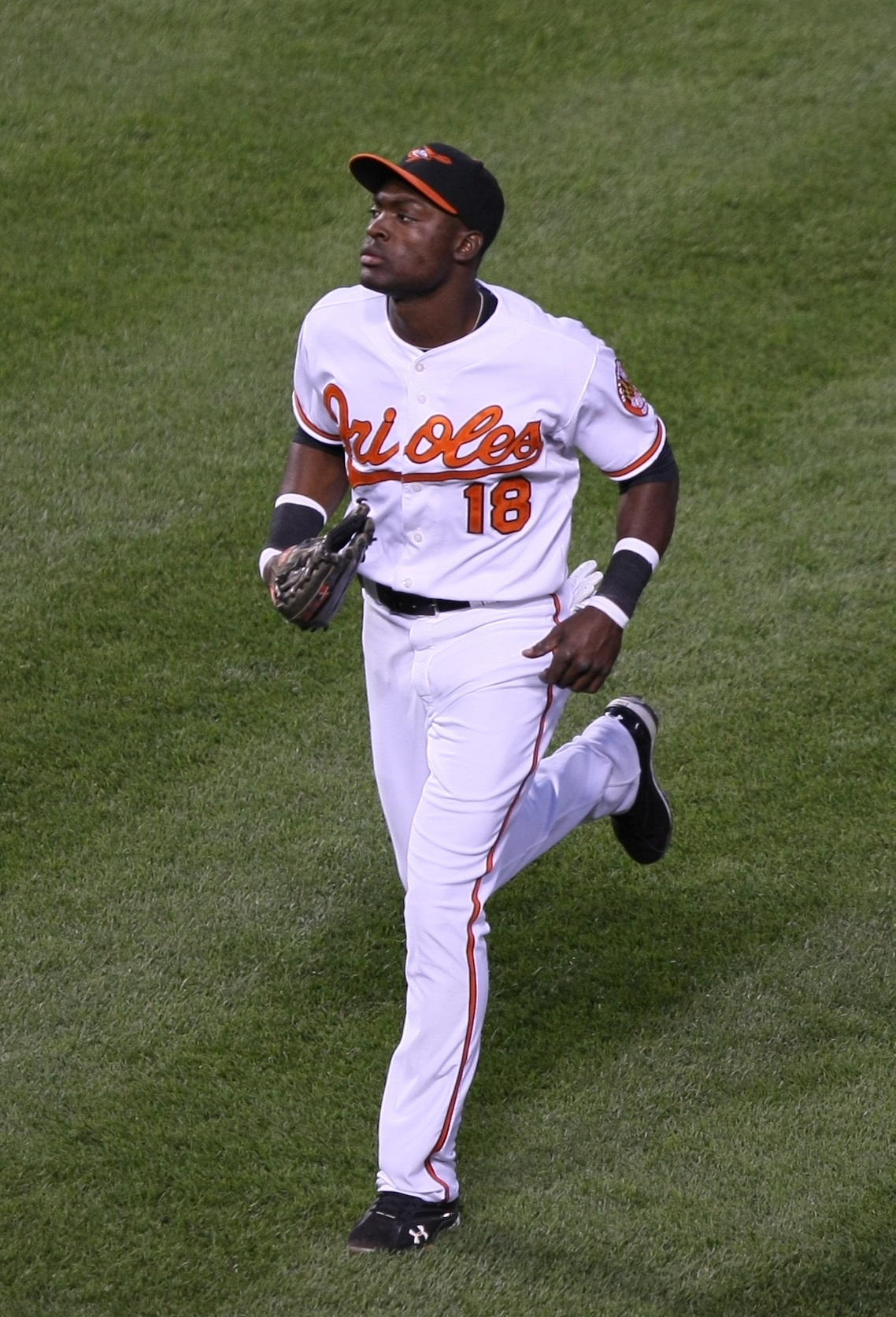
- Pie playing for the Baltimore Orioles in 2009
- Outfielder
- Born: February 8, 1985 (age 41); La Romana, Dominican Republic
- Batted: Left Threw: Left

Professional debut
- MLB: April 17, 2007, for the Chicago Cubs
- KBO: March 30, 2014, for the Hanwha Eagles
- CPBL: March 20, 2016, for the Uni-President 7-Eleven Lions

Last appearance
- MLB: September 29, 2013, for the Pittsburgh Pirates
- KBO: October 13, 2014, for the Hanwha Eagles
- CPBL: March 27, 2016, for the Uni-President 7-Eleven Lions

MLB statistics
- Batting average: .246
- Home runs: 17
- Runs batted in: 99

KBO statistics
- Batting average: .326
- Home runs: 17
- Runs batted in: 92

CPBL statistics
- Batting average: .300
- Home runs: 1
- Runs batted in: 4
- Stats at Baseball Reference

Teams
- Chicago Cubs (2007–2008); Baltimore Orioles (2009–2011); Pittsburgh Pirates (2013); Hanwha Eagles (2014); Uni-President 7-Eleven Lions (2016)

Career highlights and awards
- Hit for the cycle on August 14, 2009

Félix Pie Dofen (/ˈpiːeɪ/ PEE-ay; born February 8, 1985) is a Haitian former professional baseball outfielder. He played in Major League Baseball (MLB) for the Chicago Cubs, Baltimore Orioles, and Pittsburgh Pirates. Pie also played in the KBO League for the Hanwha Eagles and in the Chinese Professional Baseball League (CPBL) for the Uni-President 7-Eleven Lions.

Pie was born to Haitian immigrants in the Dominican Republic.

== Career ==
=== Chicago Cubs ===
Pie started with the Mesa Cubs, the Chicago Cubs Rookie affiliate, in 2002. He played in 55 games and hit .321, with 4 home runs and 37 runs batted in. He was called up to Boise where he played in 2 games. He played for the Lansing Lugnuts, the Cubs' Class A affiliate, in 2003. There, he hit .285 with 4 home runs and 47 runs batted in.

In 2004, he played for the Daytona Cubs. He hit .299 with 8 home runs and 47 runs batted in. In 2005, he played for the Double-A West Tennessee Diamond Jaxx. He hit .304 with 11 home runs and 25 runs batted in. His season was shortened due to a broken ankle suffered during the season. In 2006, his season began poorly, as he hit .222 in June and slugged only .343, but soon after he broke out of his slump to end with a batting average of .282, on-base percentage of .341, and slugging percentage of .451. Pie played 55 games of the 2007 season with the Iowa Cubs. Pie was a highly touted young prospect, and put on the fast-track to reach the big-league club, although he did not start the 2007 season in the major leagues. Pie's strikeout rates continued to be much higher than average. Pie was called up from Triple-A Iowa on April 17, 2007, and was in the starting lineup, replacing the injured Alfonso Soriano. At the time of his call-up, Pie was batting .444 with one home run and six RBI in 36 at-bats. Before the 2007 season, Pie was ranked as the number one prospect in the Cubs organization. He was nicknamed "The Cat."

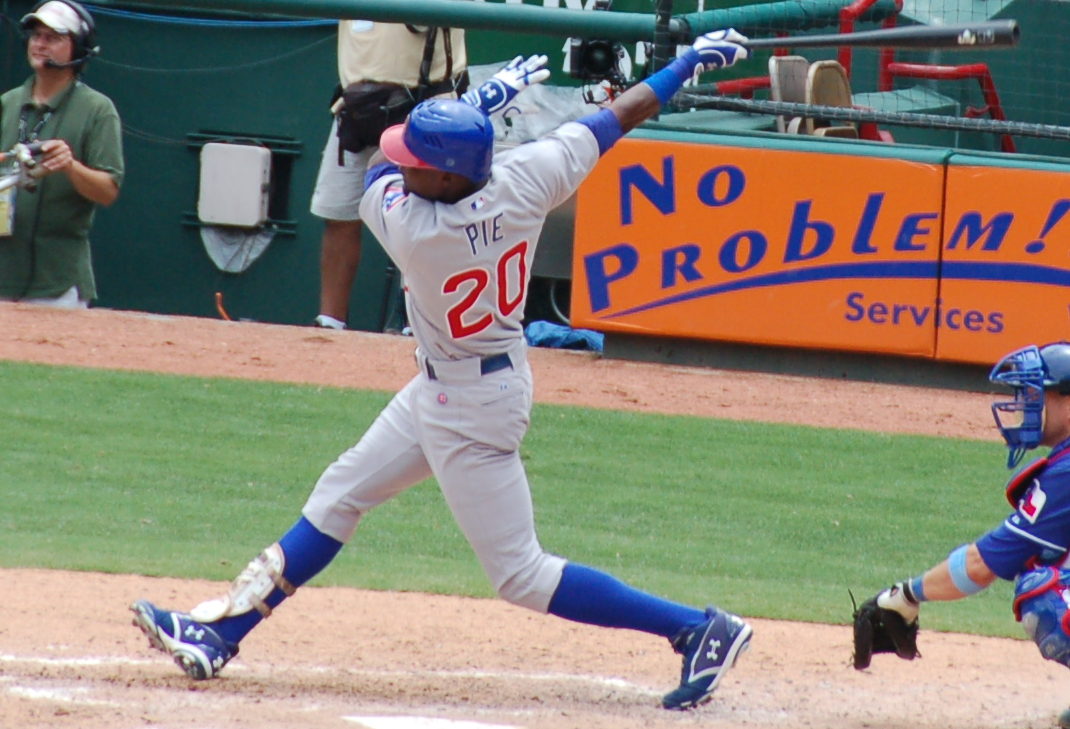
Pie batting for the Cubs on June 21, 2007.

Pie got his first major league hit on April 17, 2007, a double off Greg Maddux of the San Diego Padres. He scored his first run in the same inning on a Derrek Lee hit. In the same game, Pie also threw a runner out at home plate from center field which gave the Cubs a chance to win the game. On April 23, Pie changed his number from 17 to 20. Pie recorded his first major league home run on April 27, 2007, off Anthony Reyes of the St. Louis Cardinals. Pie was sent back down to the minors, but he was recalled on June 3, 2007, and remained with the club until July 13, when he was sent back down to Triple-A to get more regular at-bats. However, the Cubs recalled Pie from the minors in order to replace an injured Alfonso Soriano and Ángel Pagán on August 8, 2007. On August 9, Pie was brought back up to Chicago.

When the Cubs traded their starting left-handed center fielder Jacque Jones in November 2007, general manager Jim Hendry indicated that the club wasn't necessarily looking outside for a veteran, with Pie and Sam Fuld in the mix. Fuld pushed Pie for the center field spot during spring training (Piniella in late February said that Pie was only "a head or nose in front" of Fuld). "He's ready to go out there in spring training lined up next to Pie and compete to play center field", Hendry said of Fuld. Pie fell victim to the spring training 2008 injury bug that afflicted the Cubs. Originally deemed "a minor surgery on the groin region", Cubs.com reported the injury as "a twisted testicle", an injury more commonly known as testicular torsion. The surgery involved sewing the outer layer of the testicle to the scrotum wall. The surgery was deemed successful, and Pie reported back to spring training.

Pie won the center field job competition in spring training, and started opening day in center field. However, due to a slow start and the signing of former Toronto Blue Jays outfielder Reed Johnson, Pie by May 2008 was utilized mostly in a platoon with Johnson and as a defensive replacement. The Cubs signed Jim Edmonds on May 14, 2008, and optioned Pie.

=== Baltimore Orioles ===
On January 18, 2009, Pie was traded to the Baltimore Orioles for Garrett Olson and Single-A pitcher Henry Williamson. In the 2009 season, Pie started in left field for the Orioles for most of April and part of May. However, his struggles at the plate and occasional mental lapses led to the Orioles calling up rookie Nolan Reimold, who had been playing well with the Triple-A Norfolk Tides and quickly seized the opportunity to become the Orioles' starting left fielder. While on the bench for most of June and July, Pie worked extensively on improving his swing and pitch recognition with Orioles' hitting coach Terry Crowley. Injuries to Orioles' center fielder Adam Jones and Nolan Reimold's nagging Achilles problem allowed Pie to play more regularly later in the season, and he showed significant improvement compared to his April performance. On August 14, 2009, Pie took full advantage of a spot in the starting lineup by hitting for the cycle, becoming only the fourth Oriole to ever do so. Pie won the starting left field assignment in 2010 after a very strong spring, but landed on the 60-day disabled list not long into the season, where he remained until July 6, 2010.

Pie was designated for assignment by Baltimore on August 23, 2011. After the 2011 season, he elected for free agency.

=== Cleveland Indians ===
On December 11, 2011, Pie signed a minor league contract with the Cleveland Indians. He did not make the major league roster and was released on April 4, 2012.

=== Atlanta Braves ===
On May 12, 2012, Pie signed a minor league contract with the Atlanta Braves and played for the AAA affiliate Gwinnett.

=== Pittsburgh Pirates ===
On November 19, 2012, Pie signed a minor league deal with the Pittsburgh Pirates with an invitation to Spring training.

Pie spent the bulk of the 2013 season with the Indianapolis Indians, the Triple A affiliate of the Pirates. With the Indians, he batted .250 and collected 40 RBIs and 38 stolen bases. He appeared in 27 games for the Pirates and scored 5 runs while batting .138.

=== Hanwha Eagles ===
Pie signed with the Hanwha Eagles of the Korea Baseball Organization for the 2014 season and he didn't re-sign with the team after the 2014 KBO League season.

=== Uni-President 7-Eleven Lions ===
On January 12, 2016, the Uni-President 7-Eleven Lions of the Chinese Professional Baseball League, a professional baseball team based in Taiwan, confirmed that Pie signed with the team and would join the spring training in mid-February. Pie was the first foreign slugger for Lions after 2009. The Lions had been weak for the 2014 and 2015 seasons because of poor hitting. Pie was expected to help the team score more easily with his hitting ability. The previous foreign slugger for Lions was Tilson Brito, who played for Lions from 2006 to 2008. Following an ankle injury, Pie was released.

=== Bravos de León ===
On March 7, 2018, Pie signed with the Bravos de León of the Mexican Baseball League. He collected a .334 batting average with 16 HR and 61 RBI in that year. On March 7, 2019, he renewed contract for the upcoming season in this league. He posted a batting average of .381, but lost the batting title to fellow former MLB player Chris Carter. He became a free agent following the 2019 season.

=== Piratas de Campeche ===
On March 13, 2020, Pie signed with the Piratas de Campeche of the Mexican League. Pie did not play in a game in 2020 due to the cancellation of the Mexican League season because of the COVID-19 pandemic.

Pie made 46 appearances for Campeche in 2021, slashing .297/.381/.452 with five home runs, 23 RBI, and two stolen bases. He was released by the Piratas on January 17, 2022.

=== Wild Health Genomes ===
On April 8, 2022, Pie signed with the Wild Health Genomes of the Atlantic League of Professional Baseball. In 97 appearances for the Genomes, he slashed .254/.343/.418 with 13 home runs, 48 RBI, and five stolen bases. Pie became a free agent after the season.

== See also ==
- List of Major League Baseball players to hit for the cycle

Achievements
Preceded by Troy Tulowitzki	Hitting for the cycle August 14, 2009	Succeeded by B. J. Upton
