= Mark Pawelek =

American baseball player (born 1986)

- Pitcher
- Born: August 18, 1986 (age 39); Springville, Utah, U.S.
- Bats: Left Throws: Left
- Stats at Baseball Reference

Mark W. Pawelek (born August 18, 1986) is an American former professional baseball pitcher.

He was drafted by the Chicago Cubs in the 1st round (20th overall pick) round of the 2005 Major League Baseball draft. Pawelek attended Springville High School and signed with the Cubs and received a $1.75 million signing bonus instead of accepting a scholarship offer to play college baseball at Arizona State University. He played in the Cubs minor league system from 2005 to 2009, and never reached the major leagues. In 2007, Pawelek fractured the radial head in his right elbow after accidentally tripping over his PlayStation gaming console. The injury left him on the disabled list for 69 days. Pawelek maintained a 6–12 record with a 3.86 ERA in 54 appearances. His development was hampered by injures, culminating with his release from the Cubs organization in 2009. In 2010, he played independent baseball for the Gateway Grizzlies of the Frontier League. Pawelek played for Team Netherlands in the 2013 World Baseball Classic.
