= Wild Health Genomes =

Professional baseball team

- Logo

Information
- League: Atlantic League of Professional Baseball
- Location: Lexington, Kentucky
- Ballpark: Wild Health Field (2022–present)
- Founded: 2022
- Disbanded: 2022
- Nickname: Genomes
- Colors: Black, light blue, magenta, white
- Manager: Mark Minicozzi

The Wild Health Genomes were an American professional baseball team based in Lexington, Kentucky. Founded in 2022, they were a member of the Atlantic League of Professional Baseball, an MLB Partner League. The Genomes were owned by the same group as the Lexington Legends and shared Wild Health Field with the Legends.

Following the addition of the Staten Island FerryHawks as the ninth Atlantic League team, the Genomes were created to ensure an even number of teams for the 2022 season. This was the first time that an Atlantic League "filler" team has had a home stadium, as the Road Warriors were a travelling club during their intermittent stints in the league.

The Genomes made history on March 23, 2022, when they drafted catcher Alexis "Scrappy" Hopkins with the eighth pick, the first woman ever drafted for an on-field role in professional baseball. In their lone season, they finished in 3rd place in the South Division during the first half with a 35–31 record, then finished the second half in a tie for third with the High Point Rockers at 32–34. With the Gastonia Honey Hunters winning both halves, the Genomes' 67–65 overall record saw them finish four games behind the Rockers for the wild card spot.

Following the season, the Genomes' spot in the league was purchased by Attain Sports and Entertainment, owners of the Bowie Baysox and Frederick Keys. The new Spire City Ghost Hounds began to play at Nymeo Field at Harry Grove Stadium, home of the Keys, in 2023. It is not known if the new Frederick team will continue past 2023 or will also be a "filler" team in anticipation of the previously announced Hagerstown team scheduled to begin play in 2024.

== Season-by-season results ==
The Wild Health Genomes franchise played one season in the Atlantic League of Professional Baseball (2022). As of the completion of the 2022 season, the club played in 132 regular season games and compiled a record of 67 - 65 or a .508 winning percentage. The team had a postseason record of 0-0. One notable roster member was Khris Davis, playing in his final professional season after leading the majors in home runs in 2018. In 54 games for the Genomes, he hit .271/.356/.585 with 17 home runs and 46 RBI.

League champions †	Post-season Berth ♦

Season	Manager	Record^{[a]}	Win %	League^{[b]}	Division^{[c]}	GB^{[d]}	Post-season record^{[e]}	Post-season win %	Result	League affiliate
2022	Mark Minicozzi	67–65	.508	4th	3rd	21	–	–	–	Atlantic League of Professional Baseball

== Roster ==
Wild Health Genomes roster
Active (25-man) roster	Coaching staff
Pitchers: 5 Jhoendri Herrera; 7 Bruce Bell; 11 Robbie Ross Jr.; 14 Dustin Beggs; 15 Alejandro Chacín; 17 Jack Weinberger; 21 Ryan Kellogg; 22 Max Povse; 23 Josh Martin; 26 Diógenes Almengo; 27 Akeem Bostick; 28 Luis Guzman; 31 Elih Villanueva ‡; Catchers: 13 Chase Vallot; 16 Austin Rei; Infielders: 3 Clayton Mehlbauer; 4 Gavin Jones; 9 Luke Becker; 25 Jimmy Paredes; 36 Samir Dueñez; Outfielders: 2 Demetrius Moorer; 6 Eury Pérez; 12 Félix Pie ‡; 20 Moisés Sierra	Manager: -- Mark Minicozzi; Coaches: Disabled list; ‡ Inactive list; § Suspended list; updated November 1, 2022 Transactions
