= 2005 Major League Baseball draft =

Major League Baseball draft

General information
- Date: June 7–8, 2005

Overview
- 1501 total selections
- First selection: Justin Upton; Arizona Diamondbacks

The 2005 Major League Baseball draft, was held on June 7 and 8. It was conducted via conference call with representatives from each of the league's 30 teams. It is widely considered to be one of the best drafts in recent memory.

Source: Major League Baseball 2005 Official Draft Site

== First round selections ==
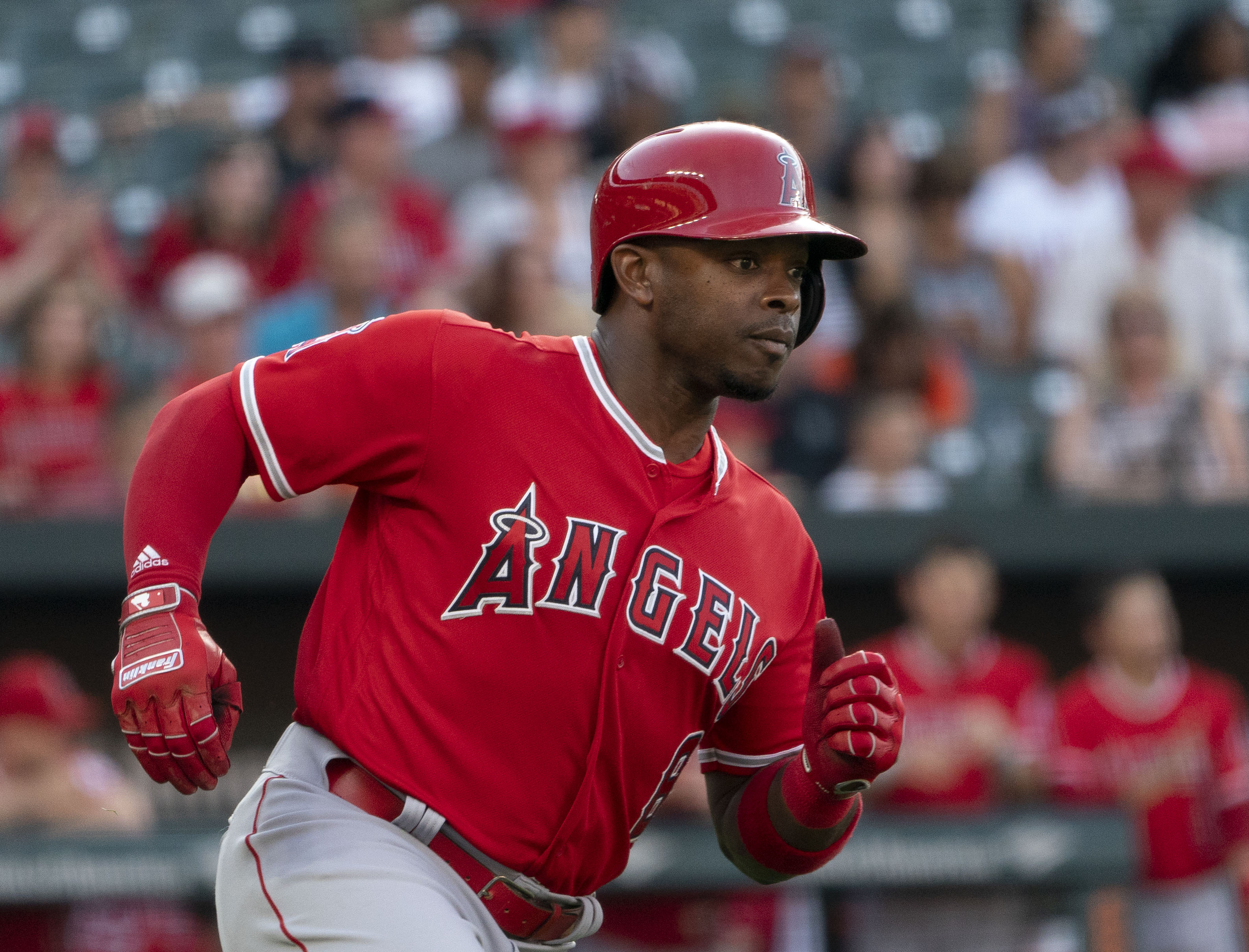
The Diamondbacks drafted Justin Upton first overall. Upton was a 4× All-Star and 3× Silver Slugger Award winner.

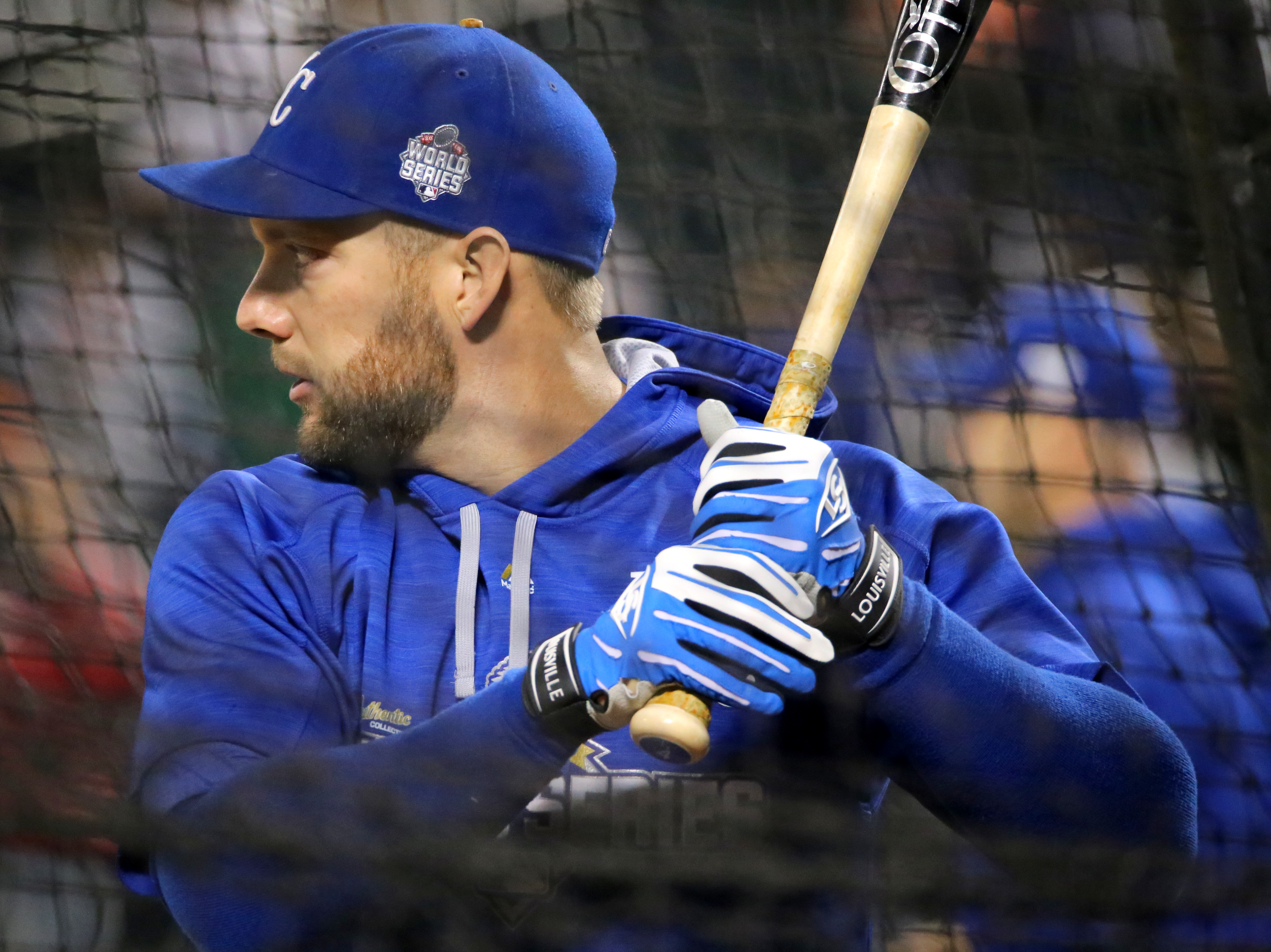
The Royals selected Alex Gordon 2nd overall. He was an 8× Gold Glove Award winner at outfield and 3× All-Star.

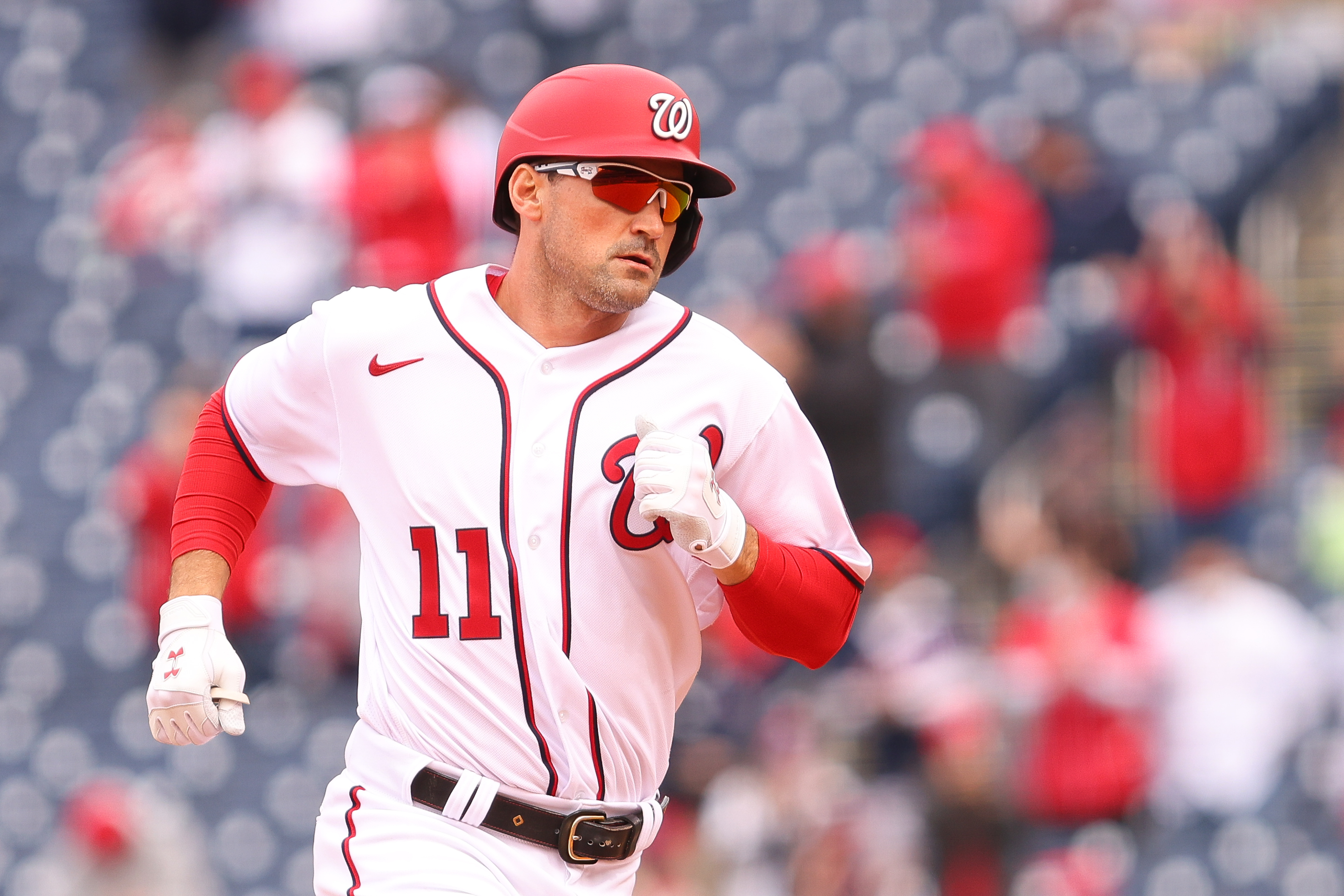
Washington selected Ryan Zimmerman 4th overall. The 2× All-Star and Silver Slugger had his number retired by the Nationals in 2022.

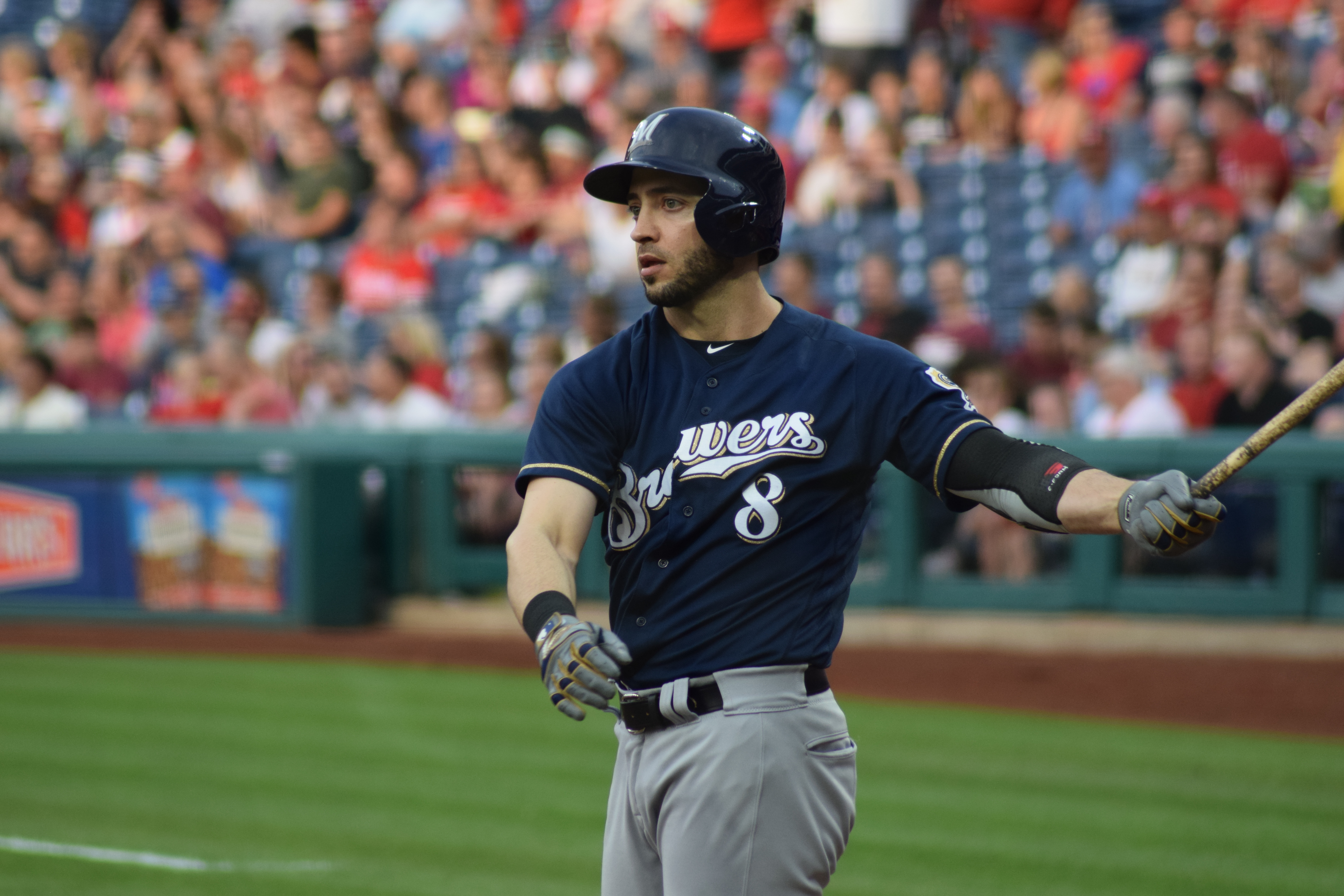
Milwaukee selected Ryan Braun 5th overall. The 2011 National League MVP was a 6× All-Star and 5× Silver Slugger Award winner.

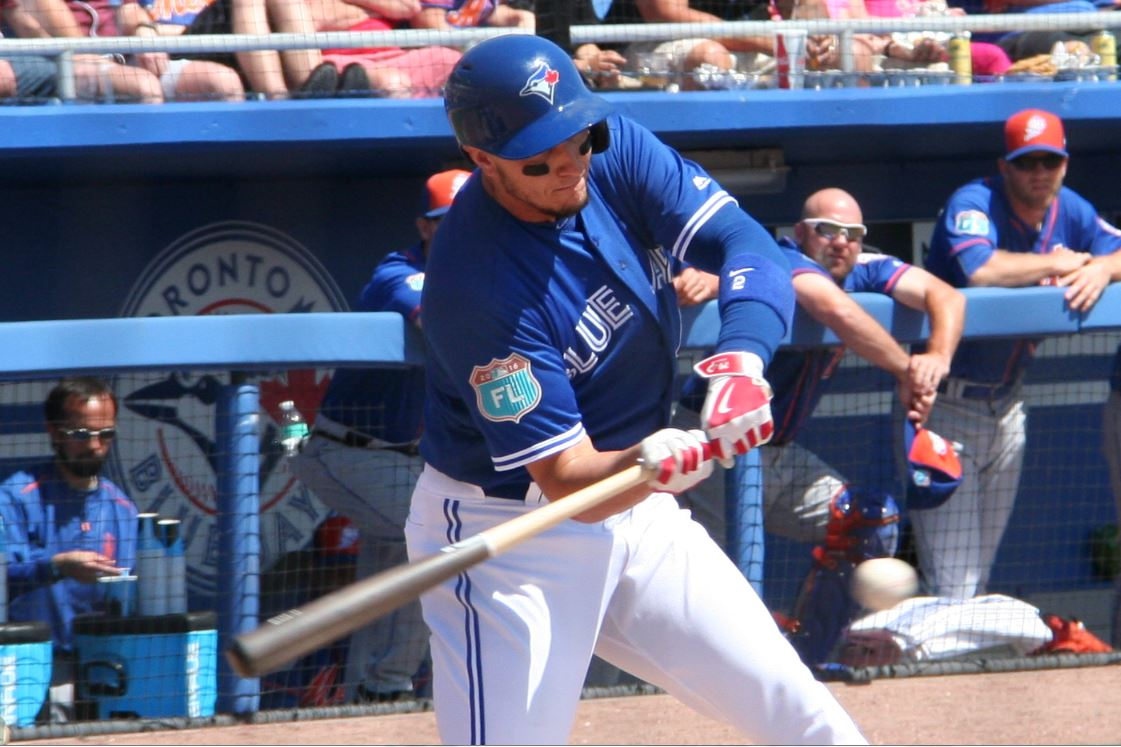
The Rockies selected Troy Tulowitzki 7th overall. The 5× All-Star, was a 2× Silver Slugger at shortstop, and 2× Gold Glove winner at shortstop.

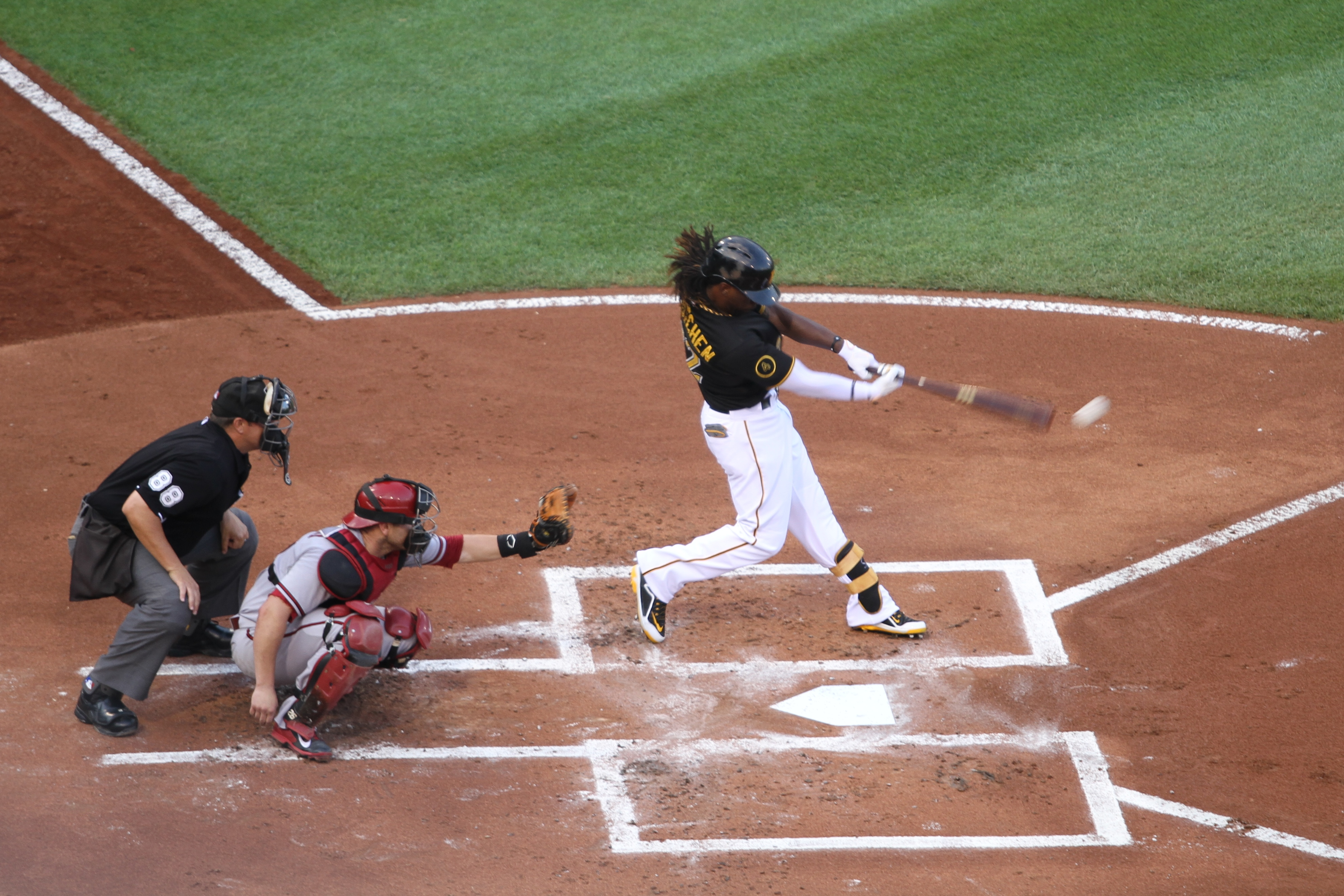
The Pirates selected Andrew McCutchen 11th overall. The 2013 National League MVP is a 5× All-Star and 4× Silver Slugger.

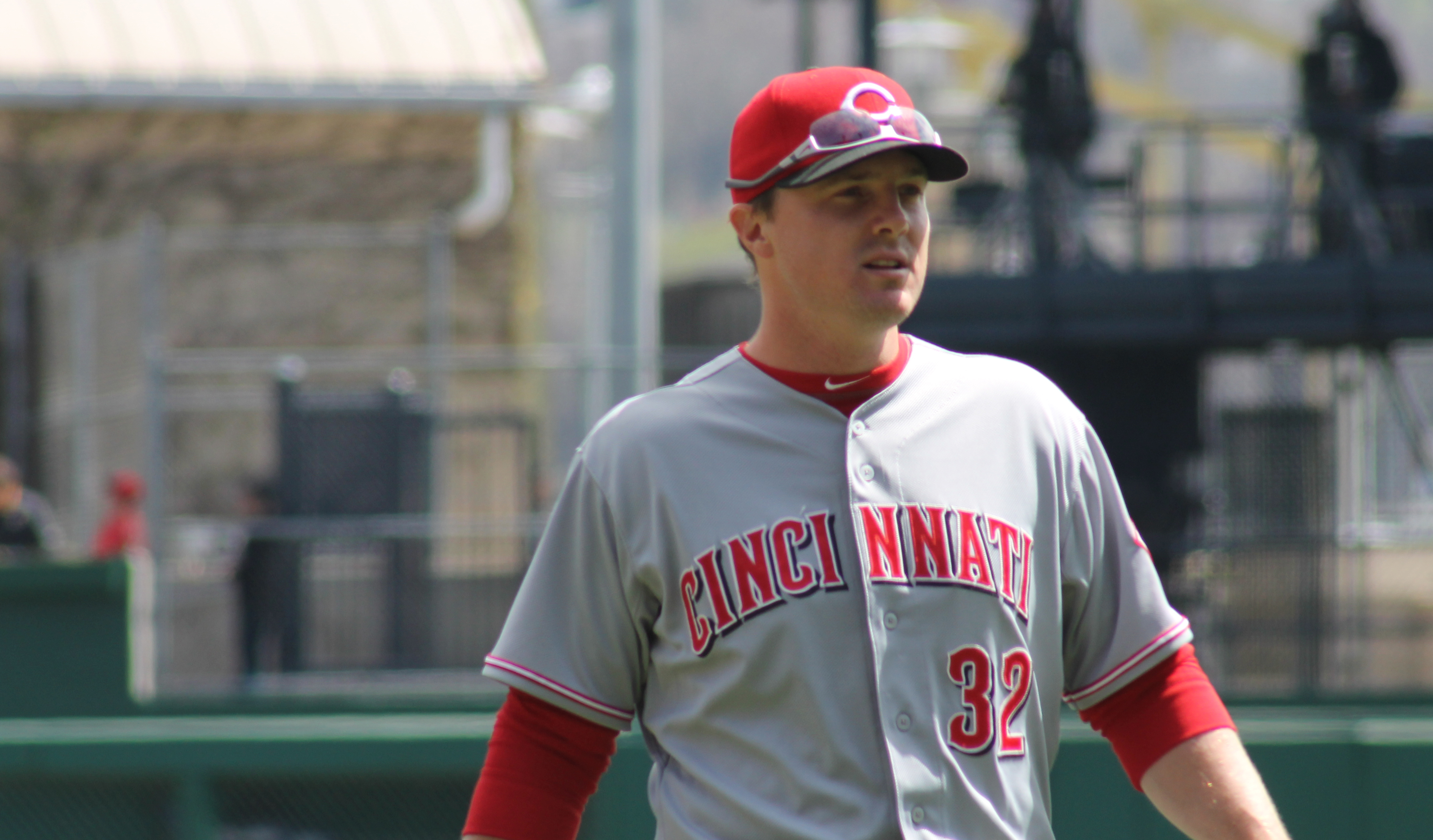
Cincinnati selected Jay Bruce 12th overall. Bruce was a 3× All-Star and 2× Silver Slugger Award as an outfielder.

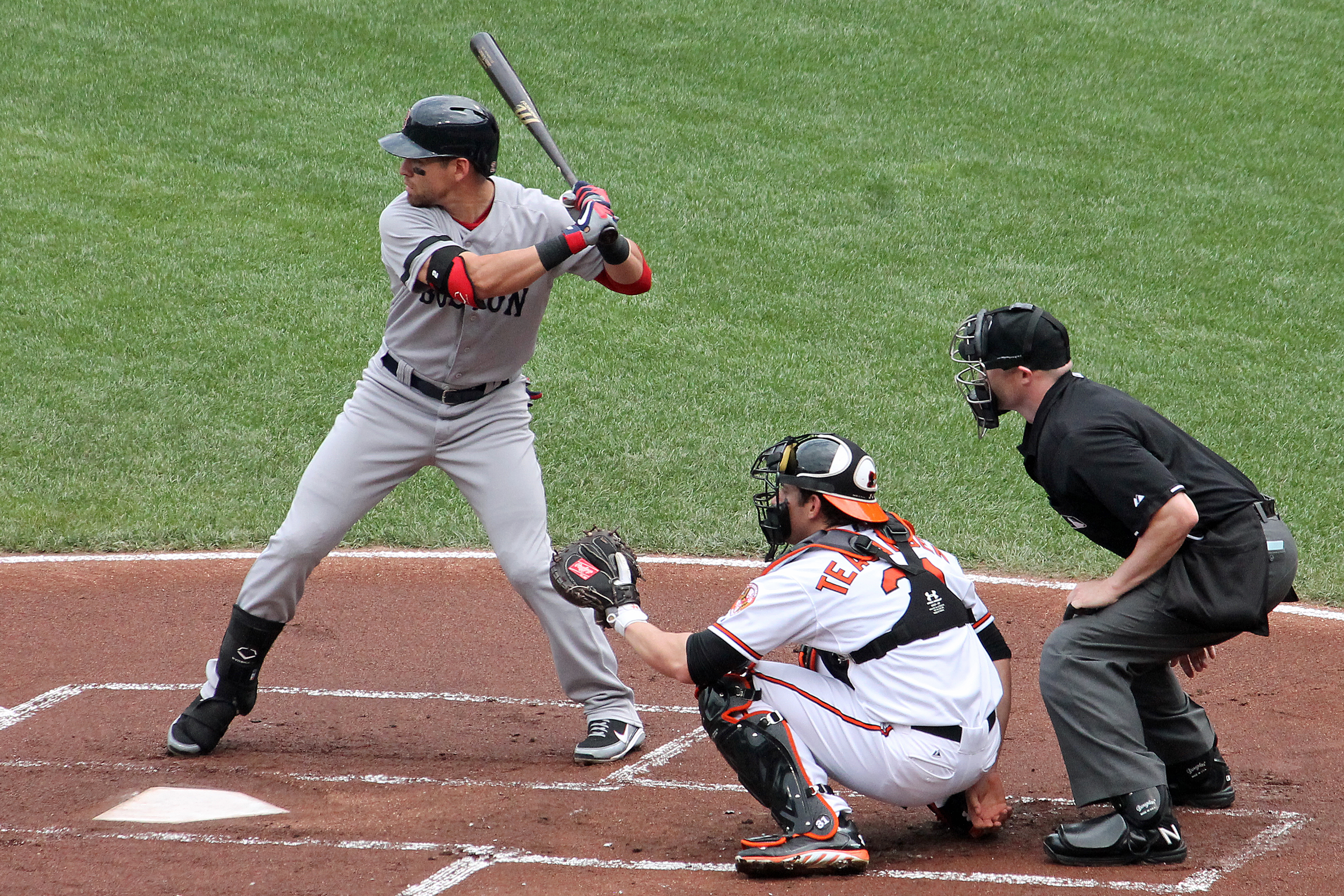
Boston selected Jacoby Ellsbury 23rd overall. He won the Gold Glove and Silver Slugger awards as an outfielder in 2011.

= All-Star

Pick	Player	Team	Position	School
1	Justin Upton	Arizona Diamondbacks	SS	Great Bridge High School (VA)
2	Alex Gordon	Kansas City Royals	3B	Nebraska
3	Jeff Clement	Seattle Mariners	C	USC
4	Ryan Zimmerman	Washington Nationals	3B	Virginia
5	Ryan Braun	Milwaukee Brewers	3B	Miami (FL)
6	Ricky Romero	Toronto Blue Jays	LHP	Cal State Fullerton
7	Troy Tulowitzki	Colorado Rockies	SS	Long Beach State
8	Wade Townsend	Tampa Bay Devil Rays	RHP	Rice
9	Mike Pelfrey	New York Mets	RHP	Wichita State
10	Cameron Maybin	Detroit Tigers	CF	T.C. Roberson High School (NC)
11	Andrew McCutchen	Pittsburgh Pirates	CF	Fort Meade High School (FL)
12	Jay Bruce	Cincinnati Reds	CF	West Brook Senior High School (TX)
13	Brandon Snyder	Baltimore Orioles	C	Westfield High School (VA)
14	Trevor Crowe	Cleveland Indians	CF	Arizona
15	Lance Broadway	Chicago White Sox	RHP	TCU
16	Chris Volstad	Florida Marlins	RHP	Palm Beach Gardens Community High School (FL)
17	C.J. Henry	New York Yankees (Note: Pick from Philadelphia Phillies as compensation for signing of free agent Jon Lieber)	SS	Putnam City High School (OK)
18	Cesar Carrillo	San Diego Padres	RHP	Miami (FL)
19	John Mayberry Jr.	Texas Rangers	RF	Stanford
20	Mark Pawelek	Chicago Cubs	LHP	Springville High School (UT)
21	Cliff Pennington	Oakland Athletics	SS	Texas A&M
22	Aaron Thompson	Florida Marlins (Note: Pick from San Francisco Giants as compensation for signing of free agent Armando Benítez)	LHP	Second Baptist School (TX)
23	Jacoby Ellsbury	Boston Red Sox (Note: Pick from Anaheim Angels as compensation for signing of free agent Orlando Cabrera)	CF	Oregon State
24	Brian Bogusevic	Houston Astros	LHP	Tulane
25	Matt Garza	Minnesota Twins	RHP	Fresno State
26	Craig Hansen	Boston Red Sox (Note: Pick from Los Angeles Dodgers as compensation for signing of free agent Derek Lowe)	RHP	St. John's
27	Joey Devine	Atlanta Braves	RHP	NC State
28	Colby Rasmus	St. Louis Cardinals (Note: Pick from Boston Red Sox as compensation for signing of free agent Édgar Rentería)	CF	Russell County High School (AL)
29	Jacob Marceaux	Florida Marlins (Note: Pick from New York Yankees as compensation for signing of free agent Carl Pavano)	RHP	McNeese State
30	Tyler Greene	St. Louis Cardinals	SS	Georgia Tech

== Supplemental first round selections ==
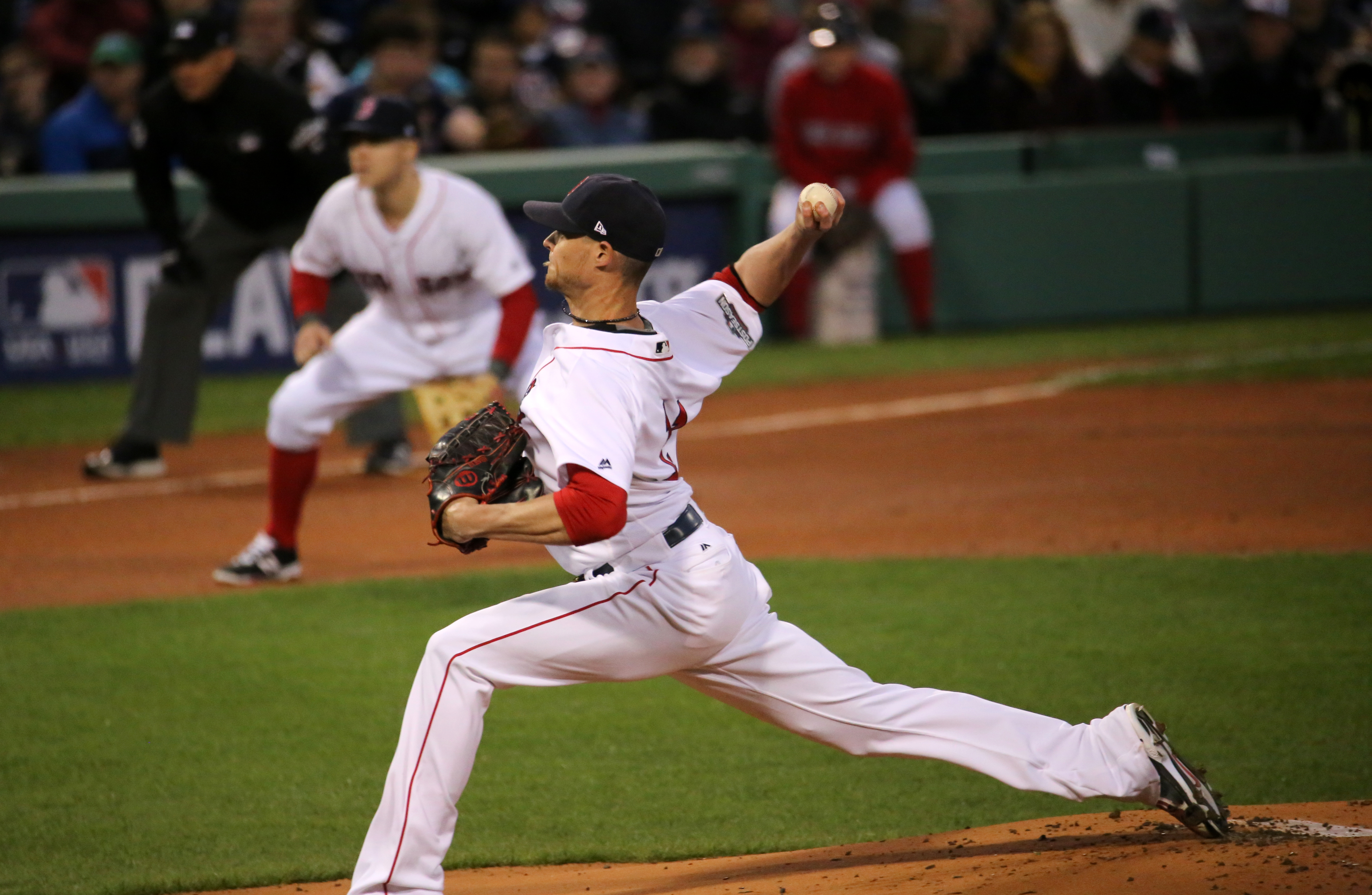
The Red Sox selected Clay Buchholz 42nd overall. The 2× All-Star pitched a no-hitter in 2007.

Pick	Player	Team	Position	School
31	Matt Torra	Arizona Diamondbacks (Note: Supplemental pick as compensation for loss of free agent Richie Sexson)	RHP	UMass-Amherst
32	Chaz Roe	Colorado Rockies (Note: Supplemental pick as compensation for loss of free agent Vinny Castilla)	RHP	Lafayette High School (KY)
33	John Drennen	Cleveland Indians (Note: Supplemental pick as compensation for loss of free agent Omar Vizquel)	OF	Rancho Bernardo High School (CA)
34	Ryan Tucker	Florida Marlins (Note: Supplemental pick as compensation for loss of free agent Armando Benítez)	RHP	Temple City High School (CA)
35	Cesar Ramos	San Diego Padres (Note: Supplemental pick as compensation for loss of free agent David Wells)	LHP	Long Beach State
36	Travis Buck	Oakland Athletics (Note: Supplemental pick as compensation for loss of free agent Damian Miller)	OF	Arizona State
37	Trevor Bell	Anaheim Angels (Note: Supplemental pick as compensation for loss of free agent Troy Percival)	RHP	Crescenta Valley High School (CA)
38	Eli Iorg	Houston Astros (Note: Supplemental pick as compensation for loss of free agent Carlos Beltrán)	OF	Tennessee
39	Henry Sanchez	Minnesota Twins (Note: Supplemental pick as compensation for loss of free agent Corey Koskie)	1B	Mission Bay High School (CA)
40	Luke Hochevar*	Los Angeles Dodgers (Note: Supplemental pick as compensation for loss of free agent Adrián Beltré)	RHP	Tennessee
41	Beau Jones	Atlanta Braves (Note: Supplemental pick as compensation for loss of free agent Jaret Wright)	LHP	Destrehan High School (LA)
42	Clay Buchholz	Boston Red Sox (Note: Supplemental pick as compensation for loss of free agent Pedro Martínez)	RHP	Angelina College
43	Mark McCormick	St. Louis Cardinals (Note: Supplemental pick as compensation for loss of free agent Édgar Rentería)	RHP	Baylor
44	Sean West	Florida Marlins (Note: Supplemental pick as compensation for loss of free agent Carl Pavano)	LHP	Captain Shreve High School (LA)
45	Jed Lowrie	Boston Red Sox (Note: Supplemental pick as compensation for loss of free agent Orlando Cabrera)	2B	Stanford
46	Tyler Herron	St. Louis Cardinals (Note: Supplemental pick as compensation for loss of free agent Mike Matheny)	RHP	Wellington High School (FL)
47	Michael Bowden	Boston Red Sox (Note: Supplemental pick as compensation for loss of free agent Derek Lowe)	RHP	Waubonsie Valley High School (IL)
48	Garrett Olson	Baltimore Orioles (Note: Compensation for failure to sign 2004 first-round pick Wade Townsend)	LHP	Cal Poly

* Did not sign with team

== Other notable players ==
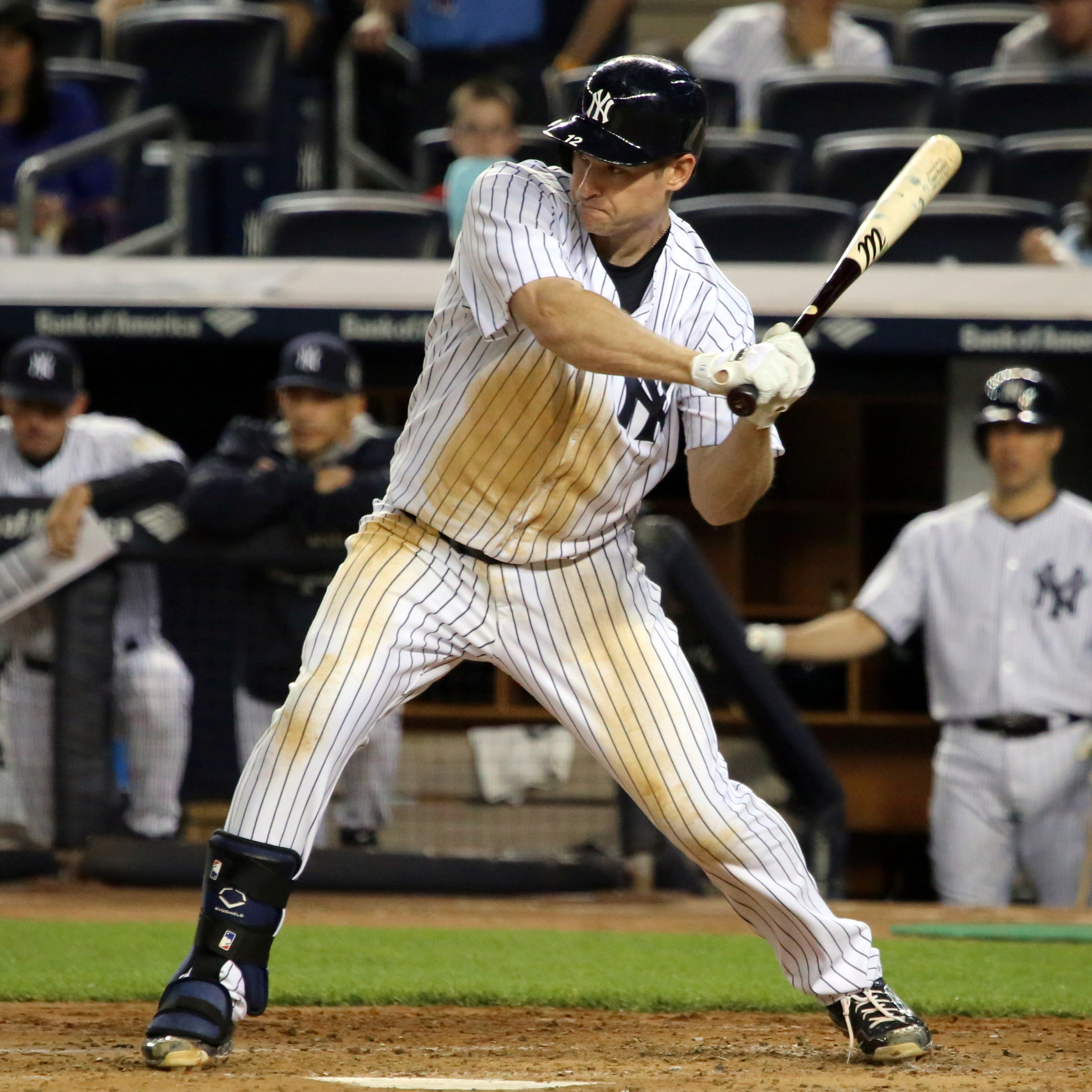
San Diego selected Chase Headley in the 2nd round. In 2012, Headley was named an All-Star and Silver Slugger at third base.

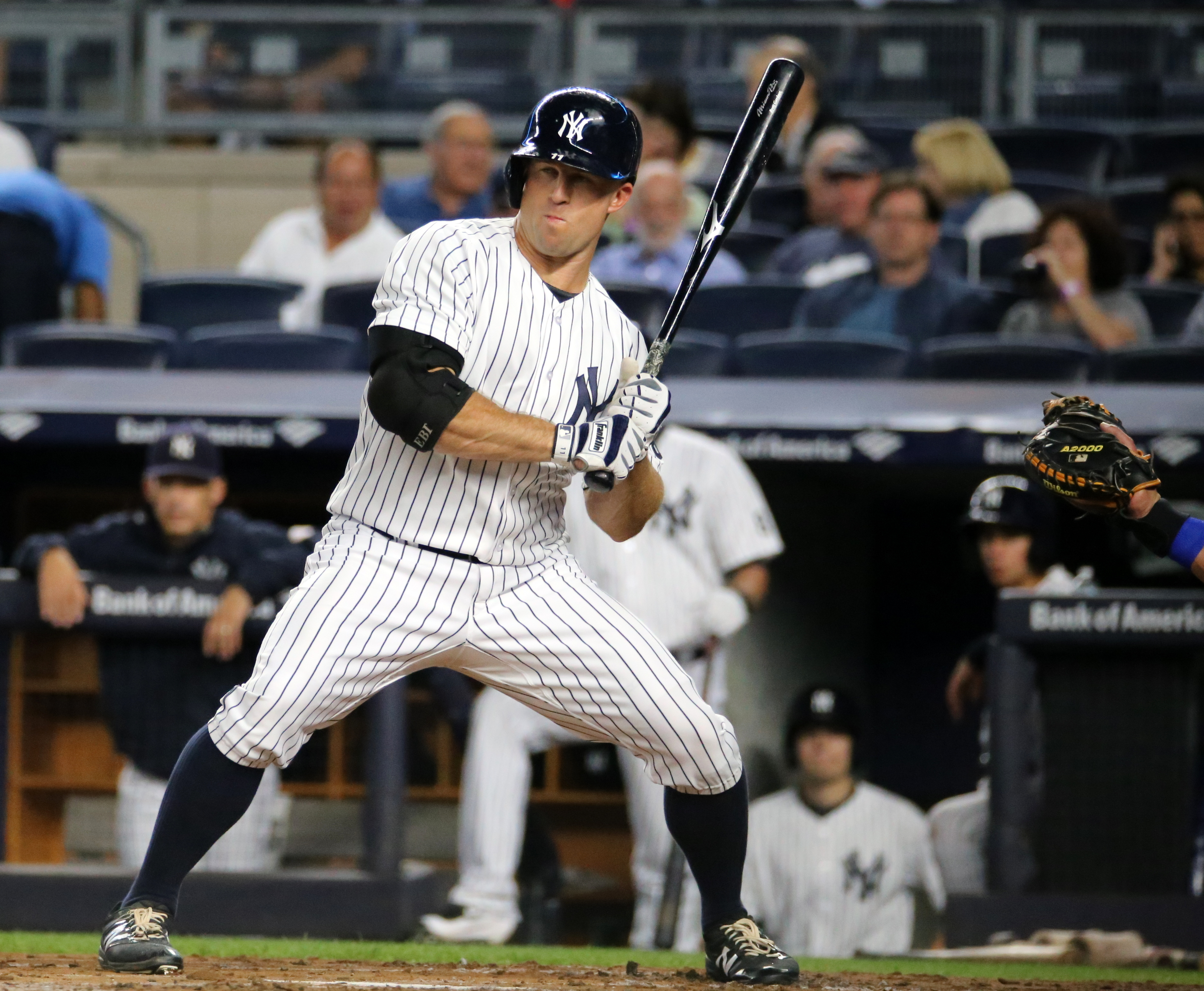
The Yankees selected Brett Gardner in the 3rd round. the 2015 All-Star won the 2016 Gold Glove as an outfielder.

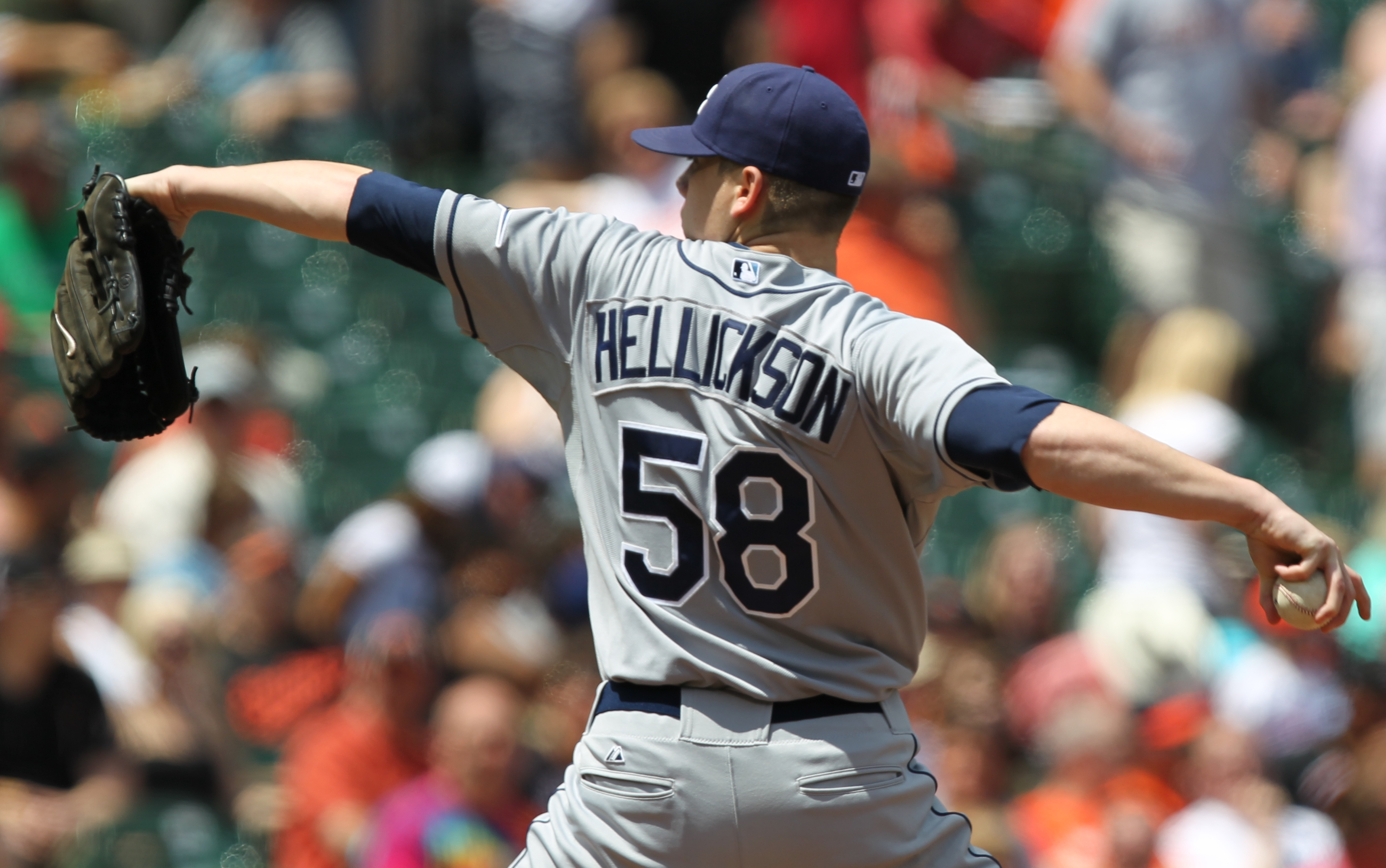
Tampa Bay selected Jeremy Hellickson in the 4th round. He won the 2011 A.L. Rookie of the Year and 2012 Gold Glove for a pitcher.

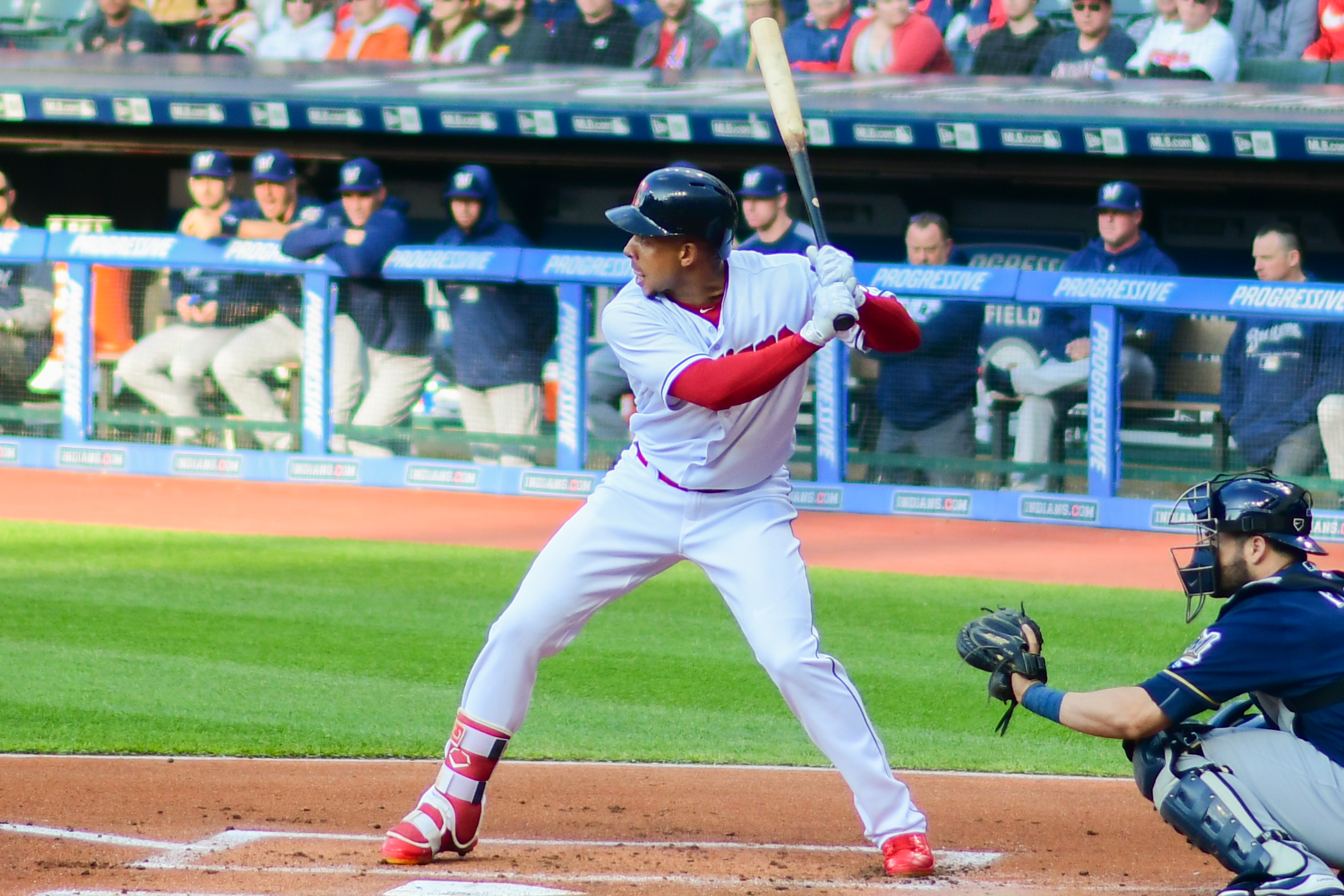
The Brewers selected Michael Brantley in the 7th round. Brantley is a 5× All-Star and a 2014 A.L. Silver Slugger as an outfielder.

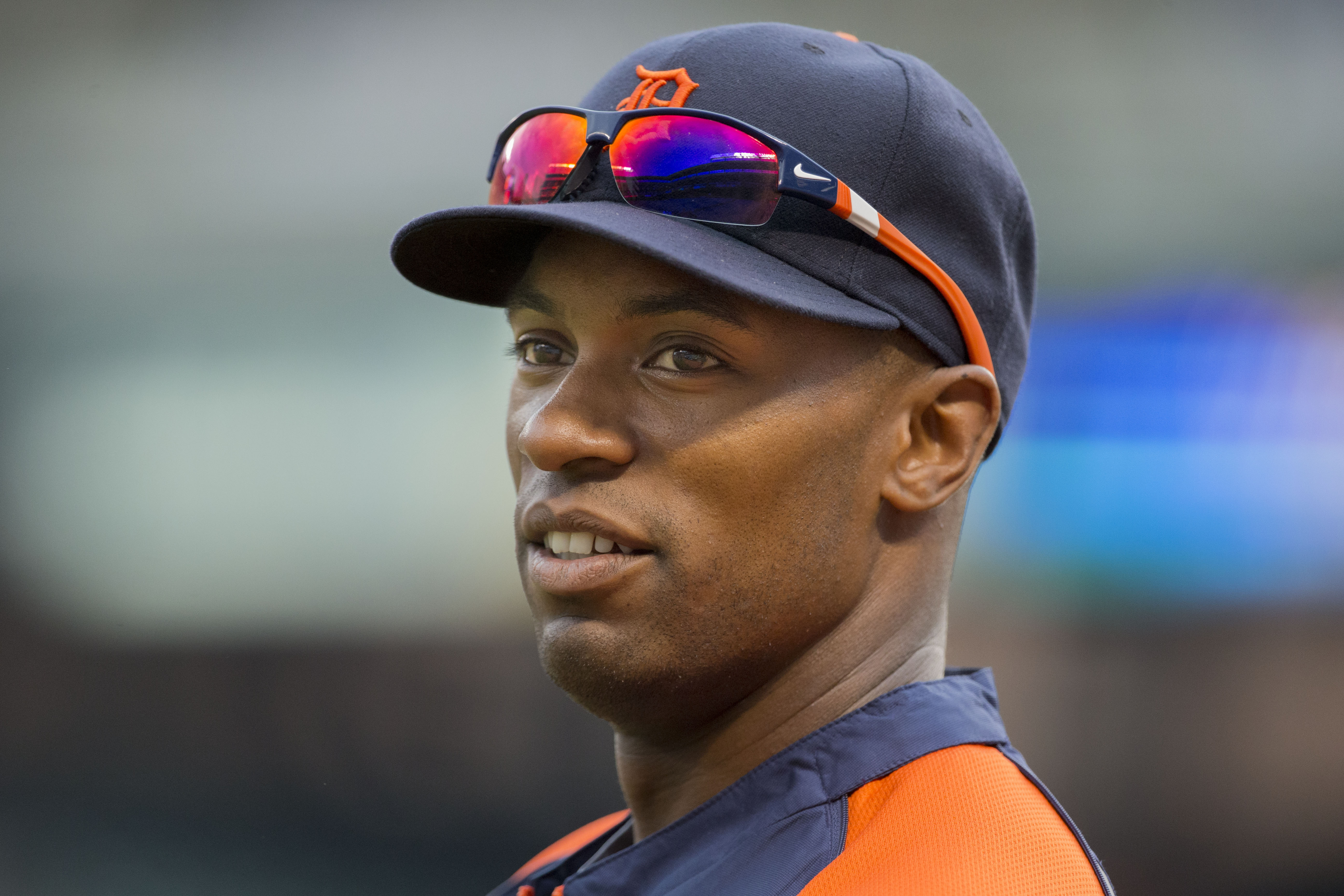
The Yankees selected Austin Jackson in the 8th round. He twice led the American League in triples.

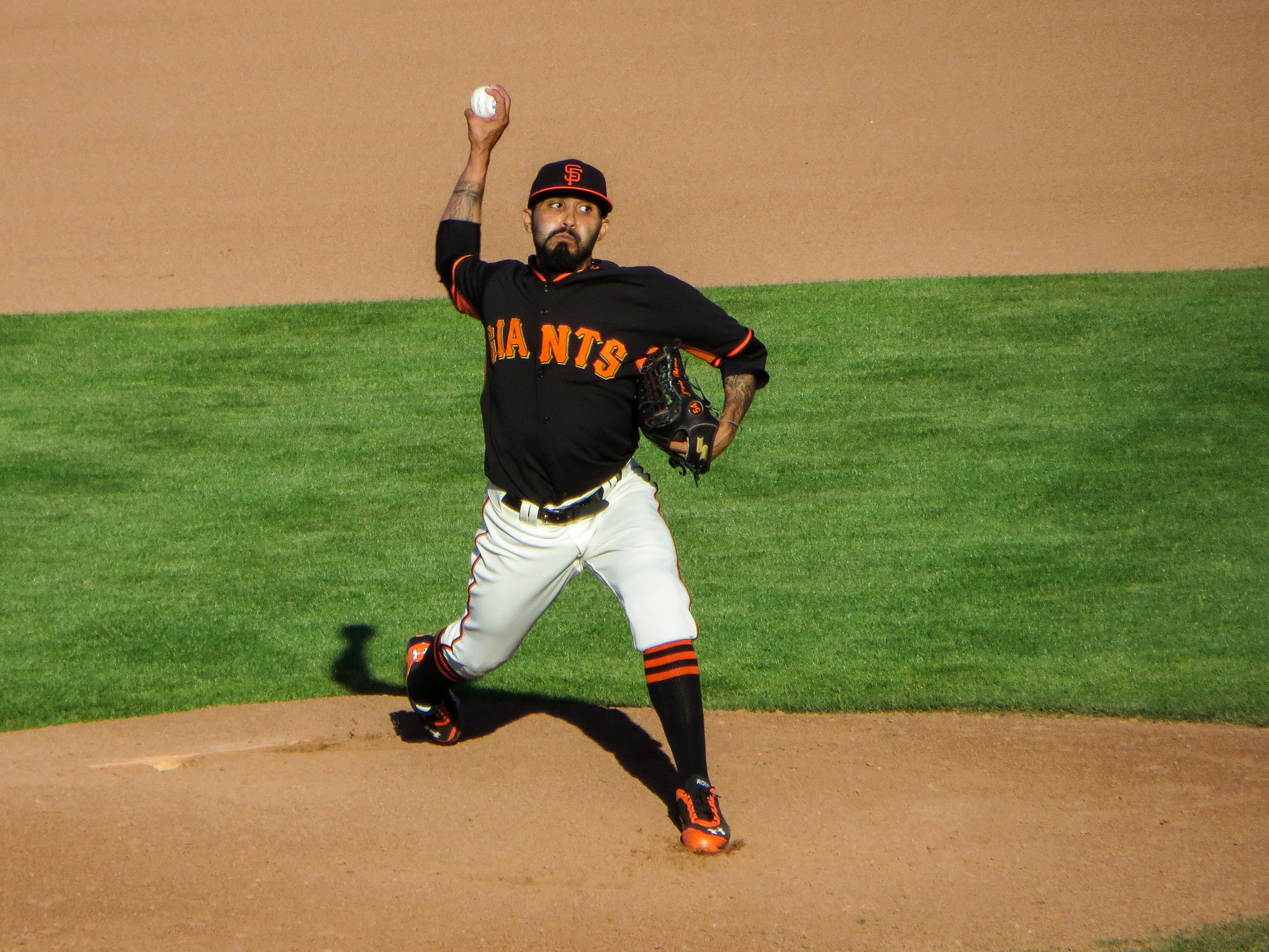
The San Francisco Giants selected Sergio Romo in the 28th round. The 2013 All-Star helped the Giants win the World Series in 2010, 2012, and 2014.

Key

	All-Star
*	Player did not sign

Round	Pick	Player	Team	Position	School
2	60	Travis Wood	Cincinnati Reds	Pitcher	Bryant High School (AR)
2	61	Nolan Reimold	Baltimore Orioles	Outfielder	Bowling Green
2	66	Chase Headley	San Diego Padres	Third baseman	Tennessee
2	73	Kevin Slowey	Minnesota Twins	Pitcher	Winthrop
2	75	Yunel Escobar	Atlanta Braves	Third baseman	Independent prospect
2	76	Nick Hundley	San Diego Padres	Catcher	Arizona
3	83	Micah Owings	Arizona Diamondbacks	Pitcher	Tulane
3	84	Brian Duensing	Minnesota Twins	Pitcher	Nebraska
3	99	Taylor Teagarden	Texas Rangers	Catcher	Texas
3	103	Sean O'Sullivan	Los Angeles Angels of Anaheim	Pitcher	Valhalla High School (CA)
3	107	Jordan Schafer	Atlanta Braves	Outfielder	Winter Haven High School (FL)
3	109	Brett Gardner	New York Yankees	Outfielder	Charleston
4	114	Justin Maxwell	Washington Nationals	Outfielder	Maryland
4	118	Jeremy Hellickson	Tampa Bay Devil Rays	Pitcher	Herbert Hoover High School (IA)
4	122	Sam LeCure	Cincinnati Reds	Pitcher	Texas
4	125	Chris Getz	Chicago White Sox	Second baseman	Michigan
4	126	Gaby Sánchez	Florida Marlins	Catcher	Miami(FL)
4	133	Brian Matusz*	Los Angeles Angels of Anaheim	Pitcher	St. Mary's High School (AZ)
5	149	Drew Butera	New York Mets	Catcher	UCF
5	170	Mitchell Boggs	St. Louis Cardinals	Pitcher	Georgia
6	173	Lance Lynn*	Seattle Mariners	Pitcher	Brownsburg High School (IN)
6	174	Marco Estrada	Washington Nationals	Pitcher	Long Beach State
6	199	Doug Fister*	New York Yankees	Pitcher	Fresno State
7	205	Michael Brantley	Milwaukee Brewers	Outfielder	Fort Pierce Central High School (FL)
7	209	Jon Niese	New York Mets	Pitcher	Defiance High School (OH)
7	218	Will Venable	San Diego Padres	Outfielder	Princeton
8	235	Jemile Weeks*	Milwaukee Brewers	Shortstop	Lake Brantley High School (FL)
8	241	Steve Pearce	Pittsburgh Pirates	First baseman	South Carolina
8	245	Clayton Richard	Chicago White Sox	Pitcher	Michigan
8	259	Austin Jackson	New York Yankees	Outfielder	Ryan High School (TX)
9	269	Bobby Parnell	New York Mets	Pitcher	Charleston Southern
10	307	Josh Outman	Philadelphia Phillies	Pitcher	Central Missouri
10	313	Peter Bourjos	Los Angeles Angels of Anaheim	Outfielder	Notre Dame Preparatory School (AZ)

- John Lannan, 11th round, 324th overall by the Washington Nationals
- Josh Tomlin, 11th round, 338th overall by the San Diego Padres, but did not sign
- Craig Stammen, 12th round, 354th overall by the Washington Nationals
- Matt Joyce, 12th round, 360th overall by the Detroit Tigers
- Josh Thole, 13th round, 389th overall by the New York Mets
- Logan Ondrusek, 13th round, 392nd overall by the Cincinnati Reds
- Casper Wells, 14th round, 420th overall by the Detroit Tigers
- Pedro Alvarez, 14th round, 438th overall by the Boston Red Sox, but did not sign
- Chris Carter, 15th round, 455th overall by the Chicago White Sox
- Andrew Bailey, 16th round, 475th overall by the Milwaukee Brewers, but did not sign
- David Hernandez, 16th round, 483rd overall by the Baltimore Orioles
- Justin Smoak, 16th round, 491st overall by the Oakland Athletics, but did not sign
- Yonder Alonso, 16th round, 495th overall by the Minnesota Twins, but did not sign
- James Russell, 17th round, 503rd overall by the Seattle Mariners, but did not sign
- Tommy Hunter, 18th round, 538th overall by the Tampa Bay Devil Rays, but did not sign
- Desmond Jennings, 18th round, 544th overall by the Cleveland Indians, but did not sign
- Ike Davis, 19th round, 568th overall by the Tampa Bay Devil Rays, but did not sign
- Burke Badenhop, 19th round, 570th overall by the Detroit Tigers
- Wade Miley, 20th round, 598th overall by the Tampa Bay Devil Rays, but did not sign
- Vance Worley, 20th round, 607th overall by the Philadelphia Phillies, but did not sign
- Andrew Cashner, 20th round, 617th overall by the Atlanta Braves, but did not sign
- Charlie Blackmon, 20th round, 618th overall by the Boston Red Sox, but did not sign
- Logan Morrison, 22nd round, 666th overall by the Florida Marlins
- Tommy Hanson, 22nd round, 677th overall by the Atlanta Braves
- Jaime García, 22nd round, 680th overall by the St. Louis Cardinals
- Jake Arrieta, 26th round, 775th overall by the Milwaukee Brewers, but did not sign
- Tony Mansolino, 26th round, 781st overall by the Pittsburgh Pirates
- Kirby Yates, 26th round, 798th overall by the Boston Red Sox, but did not sign
- Sergio Romo, 28th round, 852nd overall by the San Francisco Giants
- Justin Turner, 29th round, 889th overall by the New York Yankees, but did not sign
- Ryan Buchter, 33rd round, 984th overall by the Washington Nationals
- Tyler Flowers, 33rd round, 1007th overall by the Atlanta Braves
- Alex Avila, 34th round, 1020th overall by the Detroit Tigers, but did not sign
- Brian Schlitter, 34th round, 1033rd overall by the Los Angeles Angels of Anaheim, but did not sign
- Chris Davis, 35th round, 1063rd overall by the Los Angeles Angels of Anaheim, but did not sign
- Brett Wallace, 42nd round, 1253rd overall by the Toronto Blue Jays, but did not sign
- John Axford, 42nd round, 1259th overall by the Cincinnati Reds, but did not sign
- Tim Lincecum, 42nd round, 1261st overall by the Cleveland Indians, but did not sign
- Buster Posey, 50th round, 1496th overall by the Los Angeles Angels of Anaheim, but did not sign

== Background ==
The Diamondbacks used the top overall pick on high school shortstop Justin Upton and thus made him and older brother, B.J., the highest selected pair of brothers in the history of the draft. The Devil Rays selected B.J. with the second overall pick of the 2002 draft. With the fourth overall pick, the Nationals chose one of Upton's AAU teammates, third baseman Ryan Zimmerman of the University of Virginia. Zimmerman and B.J. Upton played in the same AAU infield as New York Mets third baseman David Wright in their youth.

College third basemen accounted for three of the top five selections. A total of 13 pitchers went in the first round, 10 of whom came from the college ranks.

Rice pitcher Wade Townsend was the eighth overall pick in the first round for the second straight year. After failing to reach terms with the Orioles last year, Townsend re-entered the draft pool and was selected by Tampa Bay.

Stanford outfielder John Mayberry, the son of the longtime Major League first baseman of the same name, was drafted by the Rangers with the 19th overall pick.

Three 2005 first-round draft choices saw action before the conclusion of the Major League season. Atlanta's Joey Devine became the first Brave since Bob Horner in 1978 to appear in the Majors the same year he was drafted. Devine joined Ariel Prieto (OAK-1995), Chad Cordero (MON-2003) and Ryan Wagner (CIN-2003) as the only draftees of the last 15 years to reach the Majors before September 1 the same year. Zimmerman and Boston's Craig Hansen joined their Major League clubs in September 2005.

Ryan Braun was the first 2005 draftee to be selected to an All-Star Game. He was voted in as a starter in 2008. Jacoby Ellsbury and Clay Buchholz were the first 2005 draftees to win a World Series championship, although Buchholz, drafted in the supplemental first round, was never on the 2007 Red Sox postseason roster. Matt Garza was named MVP of the 2008 ALCS.

Preceded by Matt Bush	1st Overall Picks; Justin Upton	Succeeded by Luke Hochevar
