= Whitaker Bank Corporation =

- Company type: Parent
- Industry: Financial services
- Founded: 1978; 47 years ago
- Founder: Elmer Whitaker
- Headquarters: Lexington, Kentucky, United States
- Products: banking services
- Number of employees: 500 (2014)
- Website: whitakerbank.com

Whitaker Bank Corporation, or just Whitaker Bank, is an American state bank headquartered in Lexington, Kentucky. By 2024, it operated its 44 locations throughout Central and Eastern Kentucky. The bank was founded in 1978 by Elmer Whitaker when he bought three bank charters in Central and Eastern Kentucky. The bank grew through acquisitions of competitors and, in 2014 at the death of his founder, was among the largest banks in the state with over 500 employees and 2 billion dollars in assets.

From 2011 until 2021, the company owned the naming rights to Whitaker Bank Ballpark.
