= CommonSpirit Ballpark =

Baseball stadium in Lexington, Kentucky

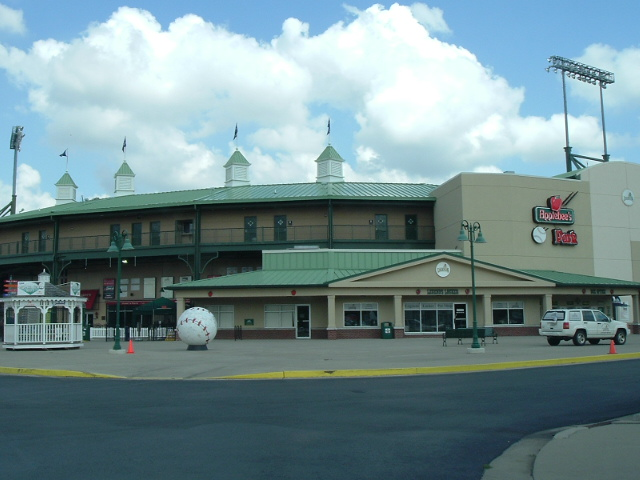
- CommonSpirit Ballpark viewed from North Broadway

- Location within Kentucky Location within the United States
- Interactive map of CommonSpirit Ballpark
- Former names: Applebee's Park (2001–2010); Whitaker Bank Ballpark (2011–2020); Lexington Legends Ballpark (2021); Wild Health Field (2022); Counter Clocks Field (2023); Legends Field (2024–2026)
- Address: 207 Legends Lane; Lexington, KY
- Coordinates: 38.06545°N 84.47852°W
- Owner: Temerity Baseball
- Operator: Temerity Baseball
- Capacity: 6,994
- Surface: Turf
- Record attendance: 9,222 (June 6, 2006)
- Field size: Left Field: 320 feet Center Field: 401 feet Right Field: 318 feet

Construction
- Groundbreaking: February 7, 2000
- Opened: May 9, 2001
- Cost: $13.5 million ($24.5 million in 2025 dollars)
- Architects: Brisbin Brook Benyon Architects, Ltd.
- Project manager: National Sports Services
- Structural engineer: Halcrow Yolles
- Services engineers: The Mitchell Partnership, Inc.
- General contractors: H&M Company, Inc.

Tenants
- Lexington Legends (SAL/ALPB) 2001–present Transylvania Pioneers (NCAA) 2020–present Wild Health Genomes (ALPB) 2022

CommonSpirit Ballpark (formerly Legends Field) is a ballpark in Lexington, Kentucky. Built in 2001, the ballpark has a seating capacity of 6,994. It is primarily used for baseball, and is the home field of the Lexington Legends of the Atlantic League of Professional Baseball, an official Partner League of Major League Baseball. CommonSpirit Ballpark has been home to the Transylvania University Pioneers baseball team since 2020. In 2024 the university reached an agreement to make the ballpark their home field for another 20 years.

== Features ==
The ballpark is modeled after larger minor-league and major-league stadiums. It features the "Pepsi Party Deck" over the right field wall. This area is available to rent by groups. Along the first base line is the "Hicks and Funfsinn Stables," where fans can order beer and watch a game from an area of picnic tables. Behind home plate and accessible from the stadium's main entrance, "The Taproom" restaurant caters to members and guests with passes. The third base line features a small but popular area for families to watch the games. This area includes a kids area with a playground, bouncer and obstacle course. The bleachers, behind left field, holds more fans. There are two videoboards and one manual out-of-town scoreboard. The ballpark contains 785 club seats and 24 luxury suites.

The stadium's largest crowd to date came on June 6, 2006, when a standing-room-only crowd of 9,222 was on hand to witness what the team dubbed "Rocket Relaunch" — Roger Clemens's first stop on his return to the Houston Astros.

== Naming ==
From 2001 until 2010, the stadium was named Applebee's Park. In January 2011, it was announced that the naming rights to the stadium had been bought by Whitaker Bank Corporation, and the stadium was renamed Whitaker Bank Ballpark. The deal ended in 2021.

In February 2022, the Legends announced that the stadium would be renamed Wild Health Field following a new naming rights agreement with Wild Health, a Lexington-based health clinic specializing in genomics-based precision medicine and wellness, and that the stadium would host a second Atlantic League team, the Wild Health Genomes. The Genomes only played one season.

In March 2023, the Lexington Legends were renamed the Lexington Counter Clocks. During that season the stadium was known as Counter Clocks Field.

In February 2024 the team announced a return to the Lexington Legends brand and the ballpark was renamed Legends Field.

In July 2026, the Lexington Legends announced CommonSpirit Health as their official naming rights partner, renaming the ballpark CommonSpirit Ballpark.

== Ballpark firsts ==
- Game: April 9, 2001 (7:16 PM EST)
- Attendance: 8,037

== Gallery ==
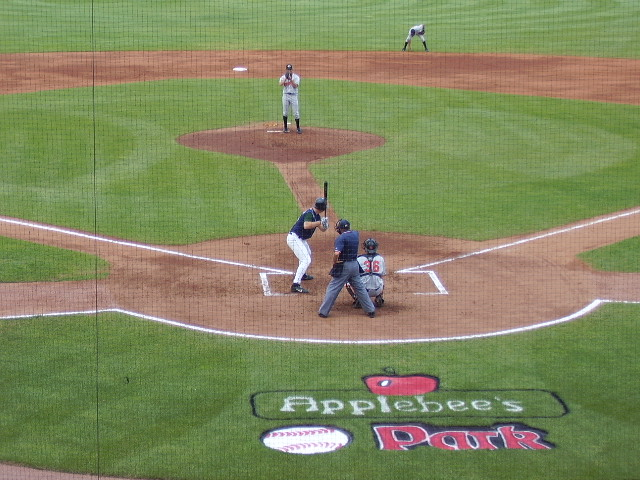
View behind home plate

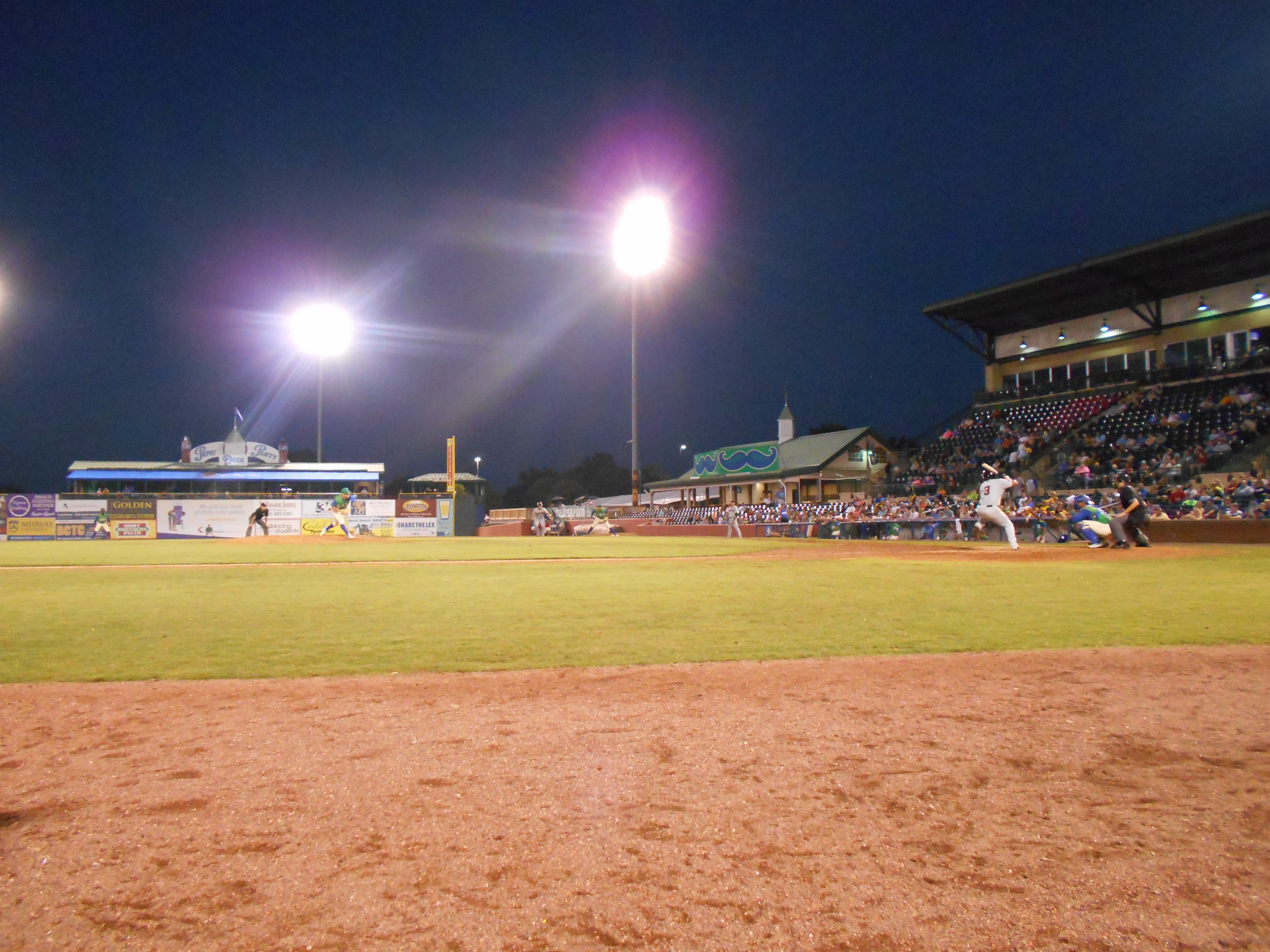
A night game
