= Elih Villanueva =

American baseball player (born 1986)

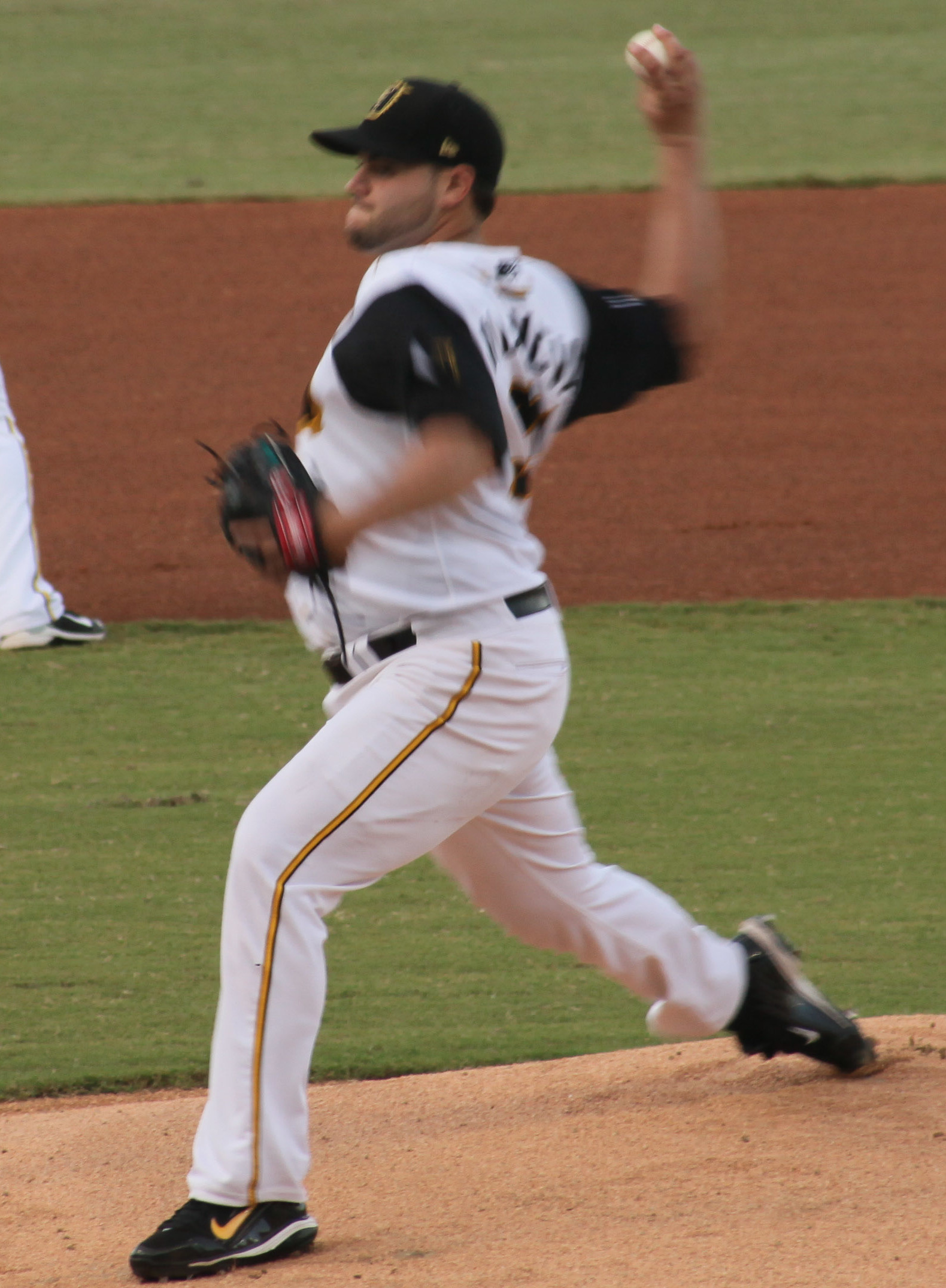
- Villanueva with the Jacksonville Suns in 2010
- Starting pitcher
- Born: July 26, 1986 (age 40); Coral Springs, Florida, U.S.
- Batted: Right Threw: Right

Professional debut
- MLB: June 15, 2011, for the Florida Marlins
- CPBL: July 27, 2018, for the Chinatrust Brothers

Last appearance
- MLB: June 15, 2011, for the Florida Marlins
- CPBL: September 1, 2020, for the Rakuten Monkeys

MLB statistics
- Win–loss record: 0–1
- Earned run average: 24.00
- Strikeouts: 2

CPBL statistics
- Win–loss record: 13–14
- Earned run average: 4.66
- Strikeouts: 206
- Stats at Baseball Reference

Teams
- Florida Marlins (2011); Chinatrust Brothers (2018–2019); Rakuten Monkeys (2020)

Career highlights and awards
- Pitched a no-hitter on September 28, 2018 (CPBL)

Elih Christopher Villanueva (born July 26, 1986) is an American former professional baseball pitcher and current pitching coach. He played in Major League Baseball (MLB) for the Florida Marlins, who drafted him in the 27th round of the 2008 Major League Baseball draft out of Florida State University. He has also played in the Chinese Professional Baseball League (CPBL) for the Chinatrust Brothers and Rakuten Monkeys.

== Amateur career ==
Villanueva was a 2004 graduate of Westminster Academy in Ft. Lauderdale, Florida where he posted a 1.15 ERA to go along with a 10–3 record on his way to earning second team All-State honors as a senior.

With Florida International he compiled a 7–3 record in his freshman season. He was second on the team in innings pitched with 101 2/3 and 79 strikeouts in 2005.

Villanueva transferred to Miami-Dade Community College in 2006 where he was named the Florida Community College Activities Association Pitcher of the Year, the National Junior College Athletic Association second team All-American and first team All-State. He helped Miami Dade win the Southern Conference championship as he posted a 0.81 ERA striking out 109 batters in 89 innings of work. After the 2006 season, he played collegiate summer baseball with the Orleans Cardinals of the Cape Cod Baseball League.

He spent his Junior and Senior years at Florida State University.

== Professional career ==
=== Florida/Miami Marlins ===
Villanueva made his professional debut and pitched at three Minor League levels in 2008. He started the season in the Rookie-level Gulf Coast Marlins where he pitched four scoreless innings in his lone Gulf Coast League start on July 19 against the Gulf Coast League Cardinals. Villanueva made five appearances, one start, for the Short-Season Jamestown Jammers of the New York–Penn League. He allowed one run over six innings in his lone start with the Jammers on September 3. Opponents hit .205 (15-for-73) against him. Villanueva was promoted to Class-A and went 1–0 with a 0.77 ERA in four games, two starts, for the Jupiter Hammerheads.

In 2009 Villanueva pitched for Class-A Advanced Jupiter and the Double-A Jacksonville Suns. With the Hammerheads he went 9–12 with a 3.47 ERA in 26 games, 25 starts. With the Suns he went 0–1 with a 4.50 ERA in two games, both of them starts. He helped the Suns to their fourth Southern League championship as a Marlins' affiliate. Villanueva threw five innings, allowing five hits, no walks, three runs, all earned, and striking out six to earn the win in the final game, however, this was not his main contribution. He hit a three-run go-ahead home run off of the Birmingham Barons pitcher, Andrew Cashner.

In 2010 Villanueva was a key figure leading the Jacksonville Suns to a second straight Southern League championship. He was second on the team with 14 wins and 115 strikeouts, and lead the team with four complete games, three shutouts, 179 innings pitched. He was named as a Topps Double-A All-Star, Southern League Post-Season All-Star, Southern League Mid-Season All-Star, and Southern League pitcher of the week for 8/16/2010.

On June 15, 2011, Villanueva was called up to replace Osvaldo Martínez. He made his Major League debut against the Philadelphia Phillies on June 15, 2011. He pitched three innings, giving up on eight runs, walking five and striking out two. His first major league strikeout was of Shane Victorino, earning the loss. He started the 2012 season and finished it with the New Orleans Zephyrs going 9-8-1 with a 3.90 ERA, a 1.45 WHIP, in 113 innings pitched with 44 walks, 83 strikeouts in 32 games played(16 starts). In 2013, he pitched at two levels: Rookie and Triple A. Combined, he threw 64 and a third innings, striking out 50 and walking 14. He had a 2.80 ERA, a 1.17 WHIP, and a 4–3 record. For 2014, he has pitched in 11 games(all starts) and has a 5–2 record with a 2.48 ERA, a 1.10 WHIP, 39 strikeouts, and 13 walks in 61.2 innings.

=== Baltimore Orioles ===
On February 28, 2015, Villanueva signed a minor league contract with the Baltimore Orioles organization. He spent the season with the Double-A Bowie Baysox and Triple-A Norfolk Tides before electing free agency on November 6, 2015.

=== Lancaster Barnstormers/Boston Red Sox ===
Villanueva took the 2016 season off of baseball. After a brief period with the independent Lancaster Barnstormers, the Boston Red Sox purchased his contract on June 4, 2017. In 14 games (12 starts) for the Double–A Portland Sea Dogs, Villanueva registered a 5–5 record and 7.85 ERA with 48 strikeouts in 57 1/3 innings of work. He elected free agency following the season on November 6.

=== Chinatrust Brothers ===
On March 30, 2018, Villanueva signed with the Chinatrust Brothers of the Chinese Professional Baseball League as a foreign backup pitcher. He will pitch for the club's farm team and can only be promoted if one of the other three foreign pitchers on the active roster is released. On July 21, 2018, Villanueva was promoted to the Brothers following the release of pitcher Zack Segovia. On September 28, 2018, Villanueva pitched a no-hitter against the Lamigo Monkeys, becoming the 9th player in the history of the league to accomplish the feat, and the second one that season. He became a free agent following the season, but later re-signed with the team as their foreign backup pitcher on April 24, 2019. He was again promoted to the active roster on June 5, 2019. He became a free agent following the season.

=== Rakuten Monkeys ===
On February 8, 2020, Villanueva signed with the Rakuten Monkeys of the Chinese Professional Baseball League. Villanueva struggled to a 7.13 ERA in 12 games for Rakuten in 2020. He became a free agent after the season.

=== West Virginia Power ===
On April 5, 2021, Villanueva signed with the West Virginia Power of the Atlantic League of Professional Baseball. In 7 starts, Villanueva posted a 2–2 record with a 3.16 ERA and 37 strikeouts.

=== Sultanes de Monterrey ===
On July 8, 2021, Villanueva's contract was purchased by the Sultanes de Monterrey of the Mexican League. In 4 starts, he posted a 1–3 record with a 13.11 ERA over 11.2 innings. The Sultanes failed to qualify for the playoffs, and Villanueva became a free agent after the season.

=== West Virginia Power (second stint) ===
On August 7, 2021, Villanueva re-signed with the West Virginia Power of the Atlantic League of Professional Baseball. He became a free agent following the season.

=== Wild Health Genomes ===
On February 28, 2022, Villanueva signed with the Wild Health Genomes of the Atlantic League of Professional Baseball. He made 24 starts for the Genomes in 2022, working to a 12–9 record and 5.45 ERA with 151 strikeouts in 140.1 innings pitched.

=== Spire City Ghost Hounds ===
On February 17, 2023, Villanueva signed with the Spire City Ghost Hounds of the Atlantic League of Professional Baseball to serve as a player/coach for the 2023 season. In 14 games (13 starts) for Spire City, he struggled to a 1–7 record and 7.33 ERA with 60 strikeouts across 66 1/3 innings of work. On November 2, Villanueva became a free agent after he was not selected in the Ghost Hounds dispersal draft.

=== Dorados de Chihuahua ===
On May 31, 2024, Villanueva signed with the Dorados de Chihuahua of the Mexican League. In 12 games (6 starts) for Chihuahua, he logged a 2–2 record and 6.75 ERA with 31 strikeouts over 30 2/3 innings pitched. Villanueva was released by the Dorados on September 23.
