= 2007 Eastern League season =

The 2007 Eastern League season began on approximately April 1 and the regular season ended on approximately September 1.

The Akron Aeros defeated the Erie SeaWolves 3 games to 1 in the Southern Division Championship Series and the Trenton Thunder defeated the Portland Sea Dogs 3 games to 1 in the Northern Division Championship Series. The Trenton Thunder defeated the Akron Aeros 3 games to 1 to win the Eastern League Championship Series.

== Regular season ==
=== Standings ===
Eastern League – Northern Division
| Team | Win | Loss | % | GB |
|---|---|---|---|---|
| **Trenton Thunder** | 83 | 59 | .585 | – |
| Portland Sea Dogs | 71 | 72 | .497 | 12.5 |
| New Hampshire Fisher Cats | 70 | 73 | .490 | 13.5 |
| New Britain Rock Cats | 69 | 72 | .489 | 13.5 |
| Connecticut Defenders | 63 | 78 | .447 | 19.5 |
| Binghamton Mets | 61 | 81 | .430 | 22.0 |

Eastern League – Southern Division
| Team | Win | Loss | % | GB |
|---|---|---|---|---|
| Erie SeaWolves | 81 | 59 | .579 | – |
| **Akron Aeros** | 80 | 61 | .567 | 1.5 |
| Altoona Curve | 73 | 68 | .518 | 8.5 |
| Bowie Baysox | 72 | 68 | .514 | 9.0 |
| Reading Phillies | 70 | 71 | .496 | 11.5 |
| Harrisburg Senators | 55 | 86 | .390 | 26.5 |

Key: Green shade indicates that team advanced to the playoffs • Bold indicates that team advanced to ELCS • Italics indicates that team won ELCS

=== Statistical league leaders ===
==== Batting leaders ====
| Stat | Player | Total |
|---|---|---|
| AVG | Jordan Brown (Akron Aeros) | .333 |
| HR | Jeff Larish (Erie SeaWolves) | 28 |
| RBI | Jeff Larish (Erie SeaWolves) | 101 |
| R | Clete Thomas (Erie SeaWolves) | 97 |

==== Pitching leaders ====
| Stat | Player | Total |
|---|---|---|
| W | Jeffrey Marquez (Trenton Thunder) | 15 |
| ERA | Alan Horne (Trenton Thunder) | 3.11 |
| SO | Alan Horne (Trenton Thunder) | 165 |
| SV | Brian Anderson (Connecticut Defenders); Matt Peterson (Altoona Curve) | 29; 29 |

== Playoffs ==
=== Divisional Series ===
==== Northern Division ====
The Trenton Thunder defeated the Portland Sea Dogs in the Northern Division playoffs 3 games to 1.

==== Southern Division ====
The Akron Aeros defeated the Erie SeaWolves in the Southern Division playoffs 3 games to 1.

=== Championship Series ===
The Trenton Thunder defeated the Akron Aeros in the ELCS 3 games to 1.
