= 2017 Minnesota Twins season =

2017 Minnesota Twins
- American League Wild Card winners
- League: American League
- Division: Central
- Ballpark: Target Field
- City: Minneapolis, Minnesota
- Record: 85–77 (.525)
- Divisional place: 2nd
- Owners: Jim Pohlad
- President of baseball operations: Derek Falvey
- General managers: Thad Levine
- Managers: Paul Molitor
- Television: Fox Sports North (Dick Bremer, Bert Blyleven, Torii Hunter)
- Radio: Go 96.3 (Cory Provus, Dan Gladden)
- Stats: ESPN.com; Baseball Reference

The 2017 Minnesota Twins season was the 57th season for the Minnesota Twins franchise in the Twin Cities of Minnesota, their eighth season at Target Field and the 117th overall in the American League. The Twins began the season on April 3 at home against the Kansas City Royals and finished the year on October 1 at home against the Detroit Tigers.

On September 27, the Twins clinched the second wild-card berth to become the first team in Major League Baseball history to reach the postseason after losing 100 games the previous season. They were able to take advantage of a weak American League, as they made the playoffs despite their pedestrian 85–77 record, the worst record to make the playoffs since the 2008 Los Angeles Dodgers. They lost to the New York Yankees in the ALWC Game.

== Offseason and spring training ==
The Twins recorded a 16–13 win–loss record in spring training. Three games finished tied and were therefore not included in the standings.

== Regular season ==
=== Season standings ===
AL Central
Team	W	L	Pct.	GB	Home	Road
Cleveland Indians	102	60	.630	—	49‍–‍32	53‍–‍28
Minnesota Twins	85	77	.525	17	41‍–‍40	44‍–‍37
Kansas City Royals	80	82	.494	22	43‍–‍38	37‍–‍44
Chicago White Sox	67	95	.414	35	39‍–‍42	28‍–‍53
Detroit Tigers	64	98	.395	38	34‍–‍47	30‍–‍51

Division leaders
Team	W	L	Pct.
Cleveland Indians	102	60	.630
Houston Astros	101	61	.623
Boston Red Sox	93	69	.574

Wild Card teams (Top 2 teams qualify for postseason)
Team	W	L	Pct.	GB
New York Yankees	91	71	.562	+6
Minnesota Twins	85	77	.525	—
Kansas City Royals	80	82	.494	5
Los Angeles Angels	80	82	.494	5
Tampa Bay Rays	80	82	.494	5
Seattle Mariners	78	84	.481	7
Texas Rangers	78	84	.481	7
Toronto Blue Jays	76	86	.469	9
Baltimore Orioles	75	87	.463	10
Oakland Athletics	75	87	.463	10
Chicago White Sox	67	95	.414	18
Detroit Tigers	64	98	.395	21

=== Record vs. opponents ===
2017 American League record Source: MLB Standings Grid – 2017
Team	BAL	BOS	CWS	CLE	DET	HOU	KC	LAA	MIN	NYY	OAK	SEA	TB	TEX	TOR	NL
Baltimore	—	10–9	4–3	1–6	3–4	1–5	3–3	2–4	2–5	7–12	4–3	4–2	8–11	6–1	12–7	8–12
Boston	9–10	—	6–1	4–3	3–4	3–4	2–4	2–4	5–2	8–11	3–4	3–3	11–8	5–1	13–6	16–4
Chicago	3–4	1–6	—	6–13	10–9	4–2	10–9	3–4	7–12	3–4	1–5	3–4	3–3	4–3	3–3	6–14
Cleveland	6–1	3–4	13–6	—	13–6	5–1	12–7	6–0	12–7	5–2	3–4	4–2	4–3	6–1	4–2	6–14
Detroit	4–3	4–3	9–10	6–13	—	3–4	8–11	3–4	8–11	3–3	1–5	1–6	2–5	1–5	3–3	8–12
Houston	5–1	4–3	2–4	1–5	4–3	—	3–4	12–7	5–1	5–2	12–7	14–5	3–4	12–7	4–3	15–5
Kansas City	3–3	4–2	9–10	7–12	11–8	4–3	—	6–1	8–11	2–5	3–3	5–2	4–3	1–6	3–3	9–11
Los Angeles	4–2	4–2	4–3	0–6	4–3	7–12	1–6	—	2–5	4–2	12–7	12–7	3–4	8–11	4–3	11–9
Minnesota	5–2	2–5	12–7	7–12	11–8	1–5	11–8	5–2	—	2–4	3–3	3–4	2–4	4–3	4–3	13–7
New York	12–7	11–8	4–3	2–5	3–3	2–5	5–2	2–4	4–2	—	2–5	5–2	12–7	3–3	9–10	15–5
Oakland	3–4	4–3	5–1	4–3	5–1	7–12	3–3	7–12	3–3	5–2	—	7–12	2–5	10–9	2–5	7–13
Seattle	2–4	3–3	4–3	2–4	6–1	5–14	2–5	7–12	4–3	2–5	12–7	—	5–1	11–8	1–6	12–8
Tampa Bay	11–8	8–11	3–3	3–4	5–2	4–3	3–4	4–3	4–2	7–12	5–2	1–5	—	2–4	9–10	11–9
Texas	1–6	1–5	3–4	1–6	5–1	7–12	6–1	11–8	3–4	3–3	9–10	8–11	4–2	—	3–4	14–6
Toronto	7–12	6–13	3–3	2–4	3–3	3–4	3–3	3–4	3–4	10–9	5–2	6–1	10–9	4–3	—	9–11

=== Game log ===
2017 game log: 85−77 (Home: 41−40; Away: 44−37)
April: 12–11 (Home: 5–7; Away: 7–4)

#	Date	Opponent	Score	Win	Loss	Save	Attendance	Record	Streak
1	April 3	Royals	7–1	**Santana** (1–0)	Strahm (0–1)	—	39,615	1–0	W1
2	April 5	Royals	9–1	**Santiago** (1–0)	Kennedy (0–1)	—	15,171	2–0	W2
3	April 6	Royals	5–3	**Rogers** (1–0)	Minor (0–1)	**Kintzler** (1)	16,078	3–0	W3
4	April 7	@ White Sox	3–1	**Hughes** (1–0)	Holland (0–1)	**Kintzler** (2)	14,004	4–0	W4
5	April 8	@ White Sox	2–6	Gonzalez (1–0)	**Mejia** (0–1)	—	23,024	4–1	L1
6	April 9	@ White Sox	4–1	**Santana** (2–0)	Quintana (0–2)	**Kintzler** (3)	24,074	5–1	W1
7	April 11	@ Tigers	1–2	Boyd (1–1)	**Santiago** (1–1)	Rodríguez (3)	21,237	5–2	L1
8	April 12	@ Tigers	3–5	Fulmer (1–0)	**Gibson** (0–1)	Wilson (1)	23,738	5–3	L2
9	April 13	@ Tigers	11–5	**Hughes** (2–0)	Zimmermann (1–1)	**Haley** (1)	22,573	6–3	W1
10	April 14	White Sox	1–2	Jennings (1–0)	**Pressly** (0–1)	Robertson (2)	18,466	6–4	L1
11	April 15	White Sox	6–0	**Santana** (3–0)	Quintana (0–3)	—	25,938	7–4	W1
12	April 16	White Sox	1–3	Jones (1–0)	**Pressly** (0–2)	Robertson (3)	19,511	7–5	L1
13	April 17	Indians	1–3	Salazar (1–1)	**Gibson** (0–2)	Allen (3)	16,961	7–6	L2
14	April 18	Indians	4–11	Tomlin (1–2)	**Hughes** (2–1)	—	16,553	7–7	L3
—	April 19	Indians	**Postponed (rain)** (Rescheduled for June 17)						
15	April 20	Indians	2–6	Bauer (1–2)	**Duffey** (0–1)	—	17,339	7–8	L4
16	April 21	Tigers	6–3	**Santiago** (2–1)	Verlander (1–2)	**Kintzler** (4)	22,647	8–8	W1
17	April 22	Tigers	4–5	Hardy (1–0)	Tonkin (0–1)	Rodríguez (6)	25,719	8–9	L1
18	April 23	Tigers	4–13	Fulmer (2–1)	**Gibson** (0–3)	—	26,713	8–10	L2
19	April 24	@ Rangers	3–2	**Hughes** (3–1)	Perez (1–3)	**Kintzler** (5)	19,027	9–10	W1
20	April 25	@ Rangers	8–1	**Santana** (4–0)	Cashner (0–2)	—	20,568	10–10	W2
21	April 26	@ Rangers	3–14	Hamels (2–0)	**Rogers** (1–1)	—	22,365	10–11	L1
22	April 28	@ Royals	6–4	**Breslow** (1–0)	Soria (1–1)	**Kintzler** (6)	27,911	11–11	W1
—	April 29	@ Royals	**Postponed (rain)** (Rescheduled for July 1)						
23	April 30	@ Royals	7–5	**Hughes** (4–1)	Hammel (0–3)	**Kintzler** (7)	32,685	12–11	W2

May: 14–12 (Home: 7–11; Away: 7–1)

#	Date	Opponent	Score	Win	Loss	Save	Attendance	Record	Streak
24	May 2	A's	9–1	**Santana** (5–0)	Gray (0–1)	—	18,930	13–11	W3
25	May 3	A's	7–4	**Santiago** (3–1)	Graveman (2–2)	—	18,658	14–11	W4
26	May 4	A's	5–8	Cotton (3–3)	**Gibson** (0–4)	Casilla (5)	19,247	14–12	L1
27	May 5	Red Sox	5–4	**Kintzler** (1–0)	Barnes (3–1)		28,707	15–12	W1
28	May 6	Red Sox	1–11	Porcello (2–4)	**Tepesch** (0–1)		30,859	15–13	L1
29	May 7	Red Sox	6–17	Sale (3–2)	**Santana** (5–1)	—	31,763	15–14	L2
30	May 9	@ White Sox	7–2	**Santiago** (4–1)	Pelfrey (0–3)	—	14,498	16–14	W1
—	May 10	@ White Sox	**Postponed (rain)** (Rescheduled August 21)						
31	May 11	@ White Sox	7–6	**Pressly** (1–2)	Holland (3–3)	**Kintzler** (8)	16,084	17–14	W2
32	May 12	@ Indians	1–0	**Santana** (6–1)	Tomlin (2–4)	**Kintzler** (9)	24,452	18–14	W3
33	May 13	@ Indians	4–1	**Berríos** (1–0)	Clevinger (1–1)	**Kintzler** (10)	28,379	19–14	W4
34	May 14	@ Indians	3–8	Bauer (3–4)	**Santiago** (4–2)	—	23,099	19–15	L1
35	May 16	Rockies	3–7	Freeland (4–2)	**Hughes** (4–2)	Holland (17)	24,295	19–16	L2
—	May 17	Rockies	**Postponed (rain)** (Rescheduled May 18)						
36	May 18	Rockies	1–5	Márquez (2–2)	**Santana** (6–2)	Holland (18)	20,603	19–17	L3
37	May 18	Rockies	2–0	**Berríos** (2–0)	Chatwood (3–6)	**Kintzler** (11)	17,140	20–17	W1
38	May 19	Royals	4–3 (10)	**Kintzler** (2–0)	Alburquerque (0–1)	—	23,553	21–17	W2
—	May 20	Royals	**Postponed (rain)** (Rescheduled May 21)						
39	May 21 (1)	Royals	4–6	Minor (1–1)	**Hughes** (4–3)	Herrera (9)	n/a	21–18	L1
40	May 21 (2)	Royals	8–4	**Mejia** (1–1)	Kennedy (0–4)	—	27,852	22–18	W1
41	May 22	@ Orioles	14–7	**Gibson** (1–4)	Wilson (2–2)	—	12,882	23–18	W2
42	May 23	@ Orioles	2–0	**Santana** (7–2)	Bundy (5–3)	—	13,294	24–18	W3
43	May 24	@ Orioles	4–3	**Berríos** (3–0)	Tillman (1–1)	**Kintzler** (12)	32,267	25–18	W4
44	May 26	Rays	2–5	Archer (4–3)	**Santiago** (4–3)	Colomé (13)	20,949	25–19	L1
45	May 27	Rays	5–3	**Rogers** (2–1)	Farquhar (2–2)	**Kintzler** (13)	27,530	26–19	W1
46	May 28	Rays	6–8 (15)	Colomé (1–2)	**Santiago** (4–4)	Ramírez (1)	28,951	26–20	L1
47	May 29	Astros	8–16	Jankowski (1–0)	**Breslow** (0–1)	—	24,472	26–21	L2
48	May 30	Astros	2–7	Fiers (2–2)	**Berríos** (3–1)	—	22,616	26–22	L3
49	May 31	Astros	6–17	Feliz (2–0)	**Santiago** (4–5)	—	25,593	26–23	L4

June: 14–15 (Home: 4–7; Away: 10–8)

#	Date	Opponent	Score	Win	Loss	Save	Attendance	Record	Streak
50	June 1	@ Angels	4–2	**Rogers** (3–1)	Alvarez (0–2)	—	33,426	27–23	W1
51	June 2	@ Angels	11–5	**Gibson** (2–4)	Ramírez (5–4)	—	39,042	28–23	W2
52	June 3	@ Angels	2–7	Shoemaker (5–3)	**Santana** (7–3)	—	40,236	28–24	L1
53	June 4	@ Angels	3–2	**Berríos** (4–1)	Nolasco (2–6)	**Kintzler** (15)	39,701	29–24	W1
54	June 6	@ Mariners	3–12	Paxton (5–0)	**Santiago** (4–6)	—	18,166	29–25	L1
55	June 7	@ Mariners	5–6	Díaz (2–2)	**Kintzler** (2–1)	—	15,732	29–26	L2
56	June 8	@ Mariners	2–1	**Gibson** (3–4)	Bergman (3–3)	**Kintzler** (16)	15,621	30–26	W1
57	June 9	@ Giants	4–0	**Santana** (8–3)	Moore (2–7)	—	41,046	31–26	W2
58	June 10	@ Giants	3–2	**Berríos** (5–1)	Samardzija (2–8)	**Kintzler** (17)	41,255	32–26	W3
59	June 11	@ Giants	8–13	Osich (1–1)	**Belisle** (0–1)	—	41,321	32–27	L1
60	June 12	Mariners	3–14	Gallardo (3–6)	**Mejía** (1–2)	—	16,996	32–28	L2
61	June 13	Mariners	20–7	**Gibson** (4–4)	Bergman (3–4)	—	17,922	33–28	W1
62	June 14	Mariners	4–6	Gaviglio (3–1)	**Santana** (8–4)	Díaz (11)	22,283	33–29	L1
63	June 15	Mariners	6–2	**Berríos** (6–1)	Miranda (6–3)	—	24,464	34–29	W1
64	June 16	Indians	1–8	Carrasco (7–3)	**Turley** (0–1)	—	30,563	34–30	L1
65	June 17	Indians	3–9	McAllister (1–0)	**Wilk** (0–2)	—	24,010	34–31	L2
66	June 17	Indians	2–6	Goody (1–0)	**Mejía** (1–3)	—	41,017	34–32	L3
67	June 18	Indians	2–5	Bauer (6–5)	**Gibson** (4–5)	Miller (1)	35,039	34–33	L4
68	June 20	White Sox	9–7	**Santana** (9–4)	Holland (5–7)	**Kintzler** (18)	26,095	35–33	W1
69	June 21	White Sox	4–2	**Berríos** (7–1)	Holmberg (1–1)	**Kintzler** (19)	33,316	36–33	W2
70	June 22	White Sox	0–9	Quintana (4–8)	**Turley** (0–2)	—	27,684	36–34	L1
71	June 23	@ Indians	5–0	**Mejía** (2–3)	Bauer (6–6)	—	31,725	37–34	W1
72	June 24	@ Indians	4–2	**Rogers** (4–1)	Allen (0–3)	**Kintzler** (20)	33,111	38–34	W2
73	June 25	@ Indians	4–0	**Santana** (10–4)	Tomlin (4–9)	—	29,672	39–34	W3
74	June 26	@ Red Sox	2–4	Sale (10–3)	**Berríos** (7–2)	Kimbrel (21)	37,172	39–35	L1
75	June 27	@ Red Sox	2–9	Pomeranz (7–4)	**Santiago** (4–7)	—	36,804	39–36	L2
76	June 28	@ Red Sox	4–1	**Mejia** (3–3)	Porcello (4–10)	**Kintzler** (21)	37,487	40–36	W1
77	June 29	@ Red Sox	3–6	Price (3–2)	**Gibson** (4–6)	Kimbrel (22)	37,445	40–37	L1
78	June 30	@ Royals	1–8	Vargas (12–3)	**Santana** (10–5)	—	34,332	40–38	L2

July: 10–15 (Home: 7–6; Away: 3–9)

#	Date	Opponent	Score	Win	Loss	Save	Attendance	Record	Streak
79	July 1 (1)	@ Royals	6–11	Minor (4–1)	**Duffey** (0–2)	—	25,571	40–39	L3
80	July 1 (2)	@ Royals	10–5	**Jorge** (1–0)	Hammel (4–7)	—	32,448	41–39	W1
81	July 2	@ Royals	2–6	Alexander (1–2)	**Santiago** (4–8)	—	28,775	41–40	L1
82	July 3	Angels	6–2	**Mejía** (4–3)	Meyer (3–5)	—	36,182	42–40	W1
83	July 4	Angels	5–4	**Gibson** (5–6)	Ramirez (7–7)	**Kintzler** (22)	25,013	43–40	W2
84	July 5	Angels	1–2	Bridwell (3–1)	**Santana** (10–6)	Norris (12)	19,106	43–41	L1
85	July 6	Orioles	6–4	**Berríos** (8–2)	Bundy (8–8)	**Kintzler** (23)	19,706	44–41	W1
86	July 7	Orioles	9–6	**Hildenberger** (1–0)	Castro (1–1)	**Kintzler** (24)	28,668	45–41	W2
87	July 8	Orioles	1–5	Miley (4–7)	**Mejía** (4–4)	—	26,323	45–42	L1
88	July 9	Orioles	5–11	Jiménez (4–4)	**Gibson** (5–7)	—	25,848	45–43	L2
**88th All-Star Game in Miami, Florida**
89	July 14	@ Astros	5–10	Morton (7–3)	**Berríos** (8–3)	—	38,006	45–44	L3
90	July 15	@ Astros	4–2	**Santana** (11–6)	Musgrove (4–8)	**Kintzler** (25)	41,038	46–44	W1
91	July 16	@ Astros	2–5	Fiers (6–4)	**Gibson** (5–8)	Giles (20)	38,253	46–45	L1
92	July 17	Yankees	4–2	**Rogers** (5–1)	Smith (0–1)	**Kintzler** (26)	27,566	47–45	W1
93	July 18	Yankees	3–6	Shreve (3–1)	**Colón** (2–9)	Chapman (10)	33,114	47–46	L1
94	July 19	Yankees	6–1	**Berríos** (9–3)	Montgomery (6–5)	—	33,380	48–46	W1
95	July 21	Tigers	3–6	Sánchez (2–0)	**Santana** (11–7)	J. Wilson (11)	22,369	48–47	L1
96	July 22	Tigers	6–5	**Gibson** (6–8)	Zimmermann (6–8)	**Kintzler** (27)	33,700	49–47	W1
97	July 23	Tigers	6–9	Boyd (4–5)	**Hildenberger** (1–1)	J. Wilson (12)	28,373	49–48	L1
98	July 24	@ Dodgers	4–6	Paredes (1–0)	**Rogers** (5–2)	Jansen (25)	47,754	49–49	L2
99	July 25	@ Dodgers	2–6	Maeda (9–4)	**Berríos** (9–4)	Ravin (1)	44,403	49–50	L3
100	July 26	@ Dodgers	5–6	Jansen (5–0)	**Kintzler** (2–2)	—	50,941	49–51	L4
101	July 28	@ A's	6–3	**García** (5–7)	Gossett (2–6)	**Kintzler** (28)	17,727	50–51	W1
102	July 29	@ A's	4–5	Coulombe (2–1)	**Rogers** (5–3)	—	27,047	50–52	L1
103	July 30	@ A's	5–6	Smith (1–0)	**Duffey** (0–3)	—	16,790	50–53	L2

August: 20–10 (Home: 11–4; Away: 9–6)

#	Date	Opponent	Score	Win	Loss	Save	Attendance	Record	Streak
104	August 1	@ Padres	0–3	Chacín (11–7)	**Berríos** (9–5)	Hand (7)	24,491	50–54	L3
105	August 2	@ Padres	5–2	**Santana** (12–7)	Perdomo (5–6)	—	23,806	51–54	W1
106	August 3	Rangers	1–4	Griffin (5–2)	**Mejía** (4–5)	Claudio (5)	22,903	51–55	L1
107	August 4	Rangers	8–4	**Colón** (3–9)	Perez (5–10)	—	22,272	52–55	W1
108	August 5	Rangers	1–4	Hamels (6–1)	**Gibson** (6–9)	—	27,415	52–56	L1
109	August 6	Rangers	6–5	**Berríos** (10–5)	Bibens-Dirkx (3–2)	**Belisle** (1)	29,056	53–56	W1
110	August 7	Brewers	5–4	**Boshers** (1–0)	Drake (3–4)	**Belisle** (2)	31,339	54–56	W2
111	August 8	Brewers	11–4	**Duffey** (1–3)	Garza (5–6)	**Gee** (1)	34,185	55–56	W3
112	August 9	@ Brewers	4–0	**Colón** (4–9)	Woodruff (1–1)	—	30,174	56–56	W4
113	August 10	@ Brewers	7–2	**Busenitz** (1–0)	Davies (13–6)	—	33,904	57–56	W5
114	August 11	@ Tigers	9–4	**Pressly** (2–2)	Sánchez (3–3)	—	29,733	58–56	W6
115	August 12	@ Tigers	11–12	Greene (3–2)	**Belisle** (0–2)	—	33,006	58–57	L1
116	August 13	@ Tigers	6–4	**Duffey** (2–3)	Rondón (1–3)	**Hildenberger** (1)	30,582	59–57	W1
117	August 15	Indians	1–8	Salazar (5–5)	**Colón** (2–2)	—	29,626	59–58	L1
—	August 16	Indians	**Postponed (rain)** (Rescheduled for August 17)						
118	August 17	Indians	3–9	Carrasco (12–5)	**Gibson** (6–10)	—	29,579	59–59	L2
119	August 17	Indians	4–2	**Hildenberger** (2–1)	Clevinger (6–5)	**Belisle** (3)	22,857	60–59	W1
120	August 18	D-backs	10–3	**Santana** (13–7)	Godley (6–7)	—	25,830	61–59	W2
121	August 19	D-backs	5–0	**Berríos** (11–5)	Greinke (14–6)	—	29,456	62–59	W3
122	August 20	D-backs	12–5	**Colón** (5–10)	McFarland (4–5)	—	27,367	63–59	W4
123	August 21	@ White Sox	6–7	Rodon (2–4)	**Melville** (0–1)	Minaya (3)		63–60	L1
124	August 21	@ White Sox	10–2	**Gee** (1–0)	Fulmer (0–1)	**Duffey** (1)	14,493	64–60	W1
125	August 22	@ White Sox	4–1	**Gibson** (7–10)	Giolito (0–1)	**Belisle** (4)	14,053	65–60	W2
126	August 23	@ White Sox	3–4	Farquhar (3–2)	**Hildenberger** (2–2)	—	15,605	65–61	L1
127	August 24	@ White Sox	1–5	Holland (7–13)	**Berríos** (11–6)	—	34,032	65–62	L2
128	August 25	@ Blue Jays	6–1	**Colón** (6–10)	Happ (6–10)	—	37,525	66–62	W1
129	August 26	@ Blue Jays	9–10	Estrada (6–8)	**Gee** (1–1)	Osuna (34)	45,591	66–63	L1
130	August 27	@ Blue Jays	7–2	**Gibson** (8–10)	Biagini (3–9)	—	42,478	67–63	W1
131	August 29	White Sox	6–4	**Santana** (14–7)	Shields (2–5)	**Belisle** (5)	20,530	68–63	W2
132	August 30	White Sox	11–1	**Berríos** (12–6)	Holland (7–14)	—	21,172	69–63	W3
133	August 31	White Sox	5–4	**Belisle** (1–2)	Minaya (2–2)	—	21,288	70–63	W4

September/October: 15–14 (Home: 7–5; Away: 8–9)

#	Date	Opponent	Score	Win	Loss	Save	Attendance	Record	Streak
134	September 1	Royals	6–7	Hammel (7–10)	**Gee** (1–2)	Alexander (2)	24,068	70–64	L1
135	September 2	Royals	17–0	**Gibson** (9–10)	Garcia (0–1)	—	33,413	71–64	W1
136	September 3	Royals	4–5	Alexander (4–3)	**Busenitz** (1–1)	Maurer (21)	32,234	71–65	L1
137	September 4	@ Rays	4–11	Cobb (10–9)	**Berríos** (12–7)	—	12,108	71–66	L2
138	September 5	@ Rays	1–2	Odorizzi (8–7)	**Colón** (6–11)	Colomé (42)	6,509	71–67	L3
139	September 6	@ Rays	10–6	**Rogers** (6–3)	Cishek (3–2)	—	7,185	72–67	W1
140	September 7	@ Royals	4–2	**Hildenberger** (3–2)	Herrera (3–3)	**Belisle** (6)	26,485	73–67	W2
141	September 8	@ Royals	8–5	**Santana** (8–5)	Kennedy (4–11)	**Belisle** (7)	31,879	74–67	W3
142	September 9	@ Royals	2–5	Minor (6–6)	**Pressly** (2–3)	Maurer (2)	29,991	74–68	L1
143	September 10	@ Royals	3–11	Vargas (15–10)	**Colón** (6–12)	—	35,003	74–69	L2
144	September 12	Padres	16–0	**Gibson** (10–10)	Wood (3–6)	—	28,852	75–69	W1
145	September 13	Padres	3–1 (10)	**Belisle** (2–2)	Maton (3–1)	—	20,018	76–69	W2
146	September 14	Blue Jays	3–2 (10)	**Gee** (2–2)	Santos (0–1)	—	22,664	77–69	W3
147	September 15	Blue Jays	3–4	Happ (9–10)	**Colón** (6–13)	Osuna (36)	27,902	77–70	L1
148	September 16	Blue Jays	2–7	Estrada (9–8)	**Mejía** (4–6)	—	29,917	77–71	L2
149	September 17	Blue Jays	13–7	**Gibson** (11–10)	Biagini (3–11)	—	27,572	78–71	W1
150	September 18	@ Yankees	1–2	Robertson (9–2)	**Santana** (15–8)	Chapman (19)	30,425	78–72	L1
151	September 19	@ Yankees	2–5	Sabathia (12–5)	**Berríos** (12–8)	Chapman (20)	30,218	78–73	L2
152	September 20	@ Yankees	3–11	Shreve (4–1)	**Colón** (6–14)	—	30,099	78–74	L3
153	September 21	@ Tigers	12–1	**Gee** (3–2)	Zimmerman (8–13)	—	25,437	79–74	W1
154	September 22	@ Tigers	7–3	**Gibson** (12–10)	Norris (4–8)	—	25,390	80–74	W2
155	September 23	@ Tigers	10–4	**Santana** (16–8)	Stumpf (0–1)	—	26,800	81–74	W3
156	September 24	@ Tigers	10–4	**Berríos** (13–8)	Farmer (4–5)	—	23,882	82–74	W4
157	September 26	@ Indians	8–6	**Rogers** (7–3)	Shaw (4–6)	**Belisle** (8)	21,268	83–74	W5
158	September 27	@ Indians	2–4	Clevinger (12–5)	**Mejia** (4–7)	—	19,682	83–75	L1
159	September 28	@ Indians	2–5	Carrasco (18–6)	**Hildenberger** (3–3)	—	21,810	83–76	L2
160	September 29	Tigers	6–3	**Berríos** (14–8)	Boyd (6–11)	**Belisle** (9)	34,580	84–76	W1
161	September 30	Tigers	2–3	Farmer (5–5)	**Slegers** (0–1)	Greene (9)	35,515	84–77	L1
162	October 1	Tigers	5–1	**Colón** (7–14)	Sánchez (3–7)	**Moya** (1)	28,148	85–77	W1

Legend: = Win = Loss = Postponement
Bold = Twins team member

== Roster ==
2017 Minnesota Twins
Roster
Pitchers: 9 Matt Belisle; 17 José Berríos; 62 Buddy Boshers; 47 Craig Breslow; 67 Alan Busenitz; 40 Bartolo Colón; 27 John Curtiss; 56 Tyler Duffey; 47 Dietrich Enns; 24 Jaime García; 35 Dillon Gee; 44 Kyle Gibson; 58 Justin Haley; 50 Chris Heston; 39 Trevor Hildenberger; 45 Phil Hughes; 76 Félix Jorge; 27 Brandon Kintzler; 49 Adalberto Mejía; 58 Tim Melville; 58 Gabriel Moya; 15 Glen Perkins; 57 Ryan Pressly; 55 Taylor Rogers; 64 Randy Rosario; 32 Drew Rucinski; 54 Ervin Santana; 53 Hector Santiago; 50 Aaron Slegers; 23 Nick Tepesch; 59 Michael Tonkin; 66 Nik Turley; 50 Jason Wheeler; 39 Adam Wilk; 51 Alex Wimmers	Catchers: 21 Jason Castro; 43 Mitch Garver; 38 Chris Gimenez; Infielders: 16 Ehire Adrianza; 2 Brian Dozier; 5 Eduardo Escobar; 23 Niko Goodrum; 7 Joe Mauer; 11 Jorge Polanco; 22 Miguel Sanó; 19 Kennys Vargas	Outfielders: 25 Byron Buxton; 8 Zack Granite; 36 Robbie Grossman; 26 Max Kepler; 20 Eddie Rosario; 39 Danny Santana	Manager: 4 Paul Molitor; Coaches: 41 Neil Allen (pitching); 75 Nate Dammann (bullpen catcher); 13 Gene Glynn (third base); 18 Eddie Guardado (bullpen); 63 Rudy Hernandez (assistant hitting); 31 Jeff Pickler (major league coach); 33 James Rowson (hitting); 37 Jeff Smith (first base); 46 Joe Vavra (bench)

== Player stats ==
=== Batting ===
Note: G = Games played; AB = At bats; R = Runs; H = Hits; 2B = Doubles; 3B = Triples; HR = Home runs; RBI = Runs batted in; SB = Stolen bases; BB = Walks; AVG = Batting average; SLG = Slugging average

Player	G	AB	R	H	2B	3B	HR	RBI	SB	BB	AVG	SLG
Brian Dozier	152	617	106	167	30	4	34	93	16	78	.271	.498
Eddie Rosario	151	542	79	157	33	2	27	78	9	35	.290	.507
Joe Mauer	141	525	69	160	36	1	7	71	2	66	.305	.417
Max Kepler	147	511	67	124	32	2	19	69	6	47	.243	.425
Jorge Polanco	133	488	60	125	30	3	13	74	13	41	.256	.410
Byron Buxton	140	462	69	117	14	6	16	51	29	38	.253	.413
Eduardo Escobar	129	457	62	116	16	5	21	73	5	33	.254	.449
Miguel Sanó	114	424	75	112	15	2	28	77	0	54	.264	.507
Robbie Grossman	119	382	62	94	22	1	9	45	3	67	.246	.380
Jason Castro	110	356	49	86	22	0	10	47	0	45	.242	.388
Kennys Vargas	78	241	33	61	13	0	11	41	0	20	.253	.444
Chris Gimenez	74	186	28	41	9	0	7	16	1	33	.220	.382
Ehire Adrianza	70	162	30	43	9	2	2	24	8	16	.265	.383
Zack Granite	40	93	14	22	2	0	1	13	2	12	.237	.290
Mitch Garver	23	46	5	9	1	3	0	3	0	6	.196	.348
Danny Santana	13	25	3	5	1	0	1	1	1	1	.200	.360
Niko Goodrum	11	17	1	1	0	0	0	0	0	1	.059	.059
Pitcher totals	162	23	3	4	1	0	0	5	0	0	.174	.217
Team totals	162	5557	815	1444	286	31	206	781	95	593	.260	.434

=== Pitching ===
Note: W = Wins; L = Losses; ERA = Earned run average; G = Games pitched; GS = Games started; SV = Saves; IP = Innings pitched; H = Hits allowed; R = Runs allowed; ER = Earned runs allowed; BB = Walks allowed; SO = Strikeouts

Player	W	L	ERA	G	GS	SV	IP	H	R	ER	BB	SO
Ervin Santana	16	8	3.28	33	33	0	211.1	177	85	77	61	167
Kyle Gibson	12	10	5.07	29	29	0	158.0	182	93	89	60	121
José Berríos	14	8	3.89	26	25	0	145.2	131	71	63	48	139
Adalberto Mejía	4	7	4.50	21	21	0	98.0	110	52	49	44	85
Bartolo Colón	5	6	5.18	15	15	0	80.0	100	46	46	15	47
Tyler Duffey	2	3	4.94	56	0	1	71.0	79	41	39	18	67
Hector Santiago	4	8	5.63	15	14	0	70.1	70	44	44	31	51
Ryan Pressly	2	3	4.70	57	0	0	61.1	52	34	32	19	61
Matt Belisle	2	2	4.03	62	0	9	60.1	48	31	27	22	54
Taylor Rogers	7	3	3.07	69	0	0	55.2	52	20	19	21	49
Phil Hughes	4	3	5.87	14	9	0	53.2	72	38	35	13	38
Brandon Kintzler	2	2	2.78	45	0	28	45.1	41	15	14	11	27
Trevor Hildenberger	3	3	3.21	37	0	1	42.0	38	15	15	6	44
Dillon Gee	3	2	3.22	14	3	1	36.1	37	14	13	9	31
Buddy Boshers	1	0	4.89	38	0	0	35.0	37	20	19	10	28
Alan Busenitz	1	1	1.99	28	0	0	31.2	22	9	7	9	23
Craig Breslow	1	1	5.23	30	0	0	31.0	38	19	18	12	18
Michael Tonkin	0	1	5.14	16	0	0	21.0	22	15	12	12	24
Justin Haley	0	0	6.00	10	0	1	18.0	22	12	12	6	14
Nik Turley	0	2	11.21	10	3	0	17.2	30	22	22	8	13
Aaron Slegers	0	1	6.46	4	3	0	15.1	12	12	11	6	9
Adam Wilk	0	1	7.84	3	1	0	10.1	16	9	9	8	6
John Curtiss	0	0	8.31	9	0	0	8.2	9	8	8	2	10
Felix Jorge	1	0	10.57	2	2	0	7.2	14	9	9	2	4
Alex Wimmers	0	0	4.91	6	0	0	7.1	8	4	4	8	7
Jaime García	1	0	4.05	1	1	0	6.2	8	3	3	3	7
Gabriel Moya	0	0	4.26	7	0	1	6.1	5	3	3	2	5
Glen Perkins	0	0	9.53	8	0	0	5.2	8	6	6	5	2
Chris Gimenez	0	0	7.20	6	0	0	5.0	7	4	4	0	0
Drew Rucinski	0	0	10.38	2	0	0	4.1	10	5	5	2	5
Dietrich Enns	0	0	6.75	2	1	0	4.0	7	4	3	1	2
Tim Melville	0	1	13.50	1	1	0	3.1	4	5	5	3	4
Jason Wheeler	0	0	9.00	2	0	0	3.0	6	5	3	4	0
Randy Rosario	0	0	30.86	2	0	0	2.1	7	8	8	0	2
Nick Tepesch	0	1	5.40	1	1	0	1.2	5	7	1	2	2
Chris Heston	0	0	0.00	1	0	0	1.0	1	0	0	0	0
Team totals	85	77	4.59	162	162	42	1436.0	1487	788	732	483	1166

== Postseason ==
=== Game log ===
2017 Postseason: 0−1 (Home 0−0; Away 0−1)
AL Wild Card Game: 0−1

#	Date	Opponent	Score	Win	Loss	Save	Attendance	Record
1	October 3	@ Yankees	4–8	Robertson (1–0)	Berríos (0–1)	—	49,280	0–1

=== Postseason rosters ===
Playoff rosters
American League Wild Card Game

- Pitchers: 9 Matt Belisle 17 José Berríos 35 Dillon Gee 39 Trevor Hildenberger 49 Adalberto Mejía 54 Ervin Santana 55 Taylor Rogers 56 Tyler Duffey 57 Ryan Pressly 62 Buddy Boshers 67 Alan Busenitz
- Catchers: 21 Jason Castro 38 Chris Gimenez 43 Mitch Garver
- Infielders: 2 Brian Dozier 5 Eduardo Escobar 7 Joe Mauer 11 Jorge Polanco 16 Ehire Adrianza 19 Kennys Vargas
- Outfielders: 8 Zack Granite 20 Eddie Rosario 25 Byron Buxton 26 Max Kepler 36 Robbie Grossman

== Farm system ==
Level	Team	League	Manager
AAA	Rochester Red Wings	International League	Mike Quade
AA	Chattanooga Lookouts	Southern League	Jake Mauer
A-Advanced	Fort Myers Miracle	Florida State League	Doug Mientkiewicz
A	Cedar Rapids Kernels	Midwest League	Tommy Watkins
Rookie	Elizabethton Twins	Appalachian League	Ray Smith
Rookie	GCL Twins	Arizona League	Ramon Borrego
Rookie	DSL Twins	Dominican Summer League	
