= 2017 Kansas City Royals season =

2017 Kansas City Royals
- League: American League
- Division: Central
- Ballpark: Kauffman Stadium
- City: Kansas City, Missouri
- Record: 80–82 (.494)
- Divisional place: 3rd
- Owners: David Glass
- General managers: Dayton Moore
- Managers: Ned Yost
- Television: Fox Sports Kansas City (Ryan Lefebvre, Jeff Montgomery, Rex Hudler, Steve Physioc)
- Radio: KCSP 610 AM (Denny Matthews, Steve Stewart, Rex Hudler, Ryan Lefebvre, Steve Physioc, Jeff Montgomery)

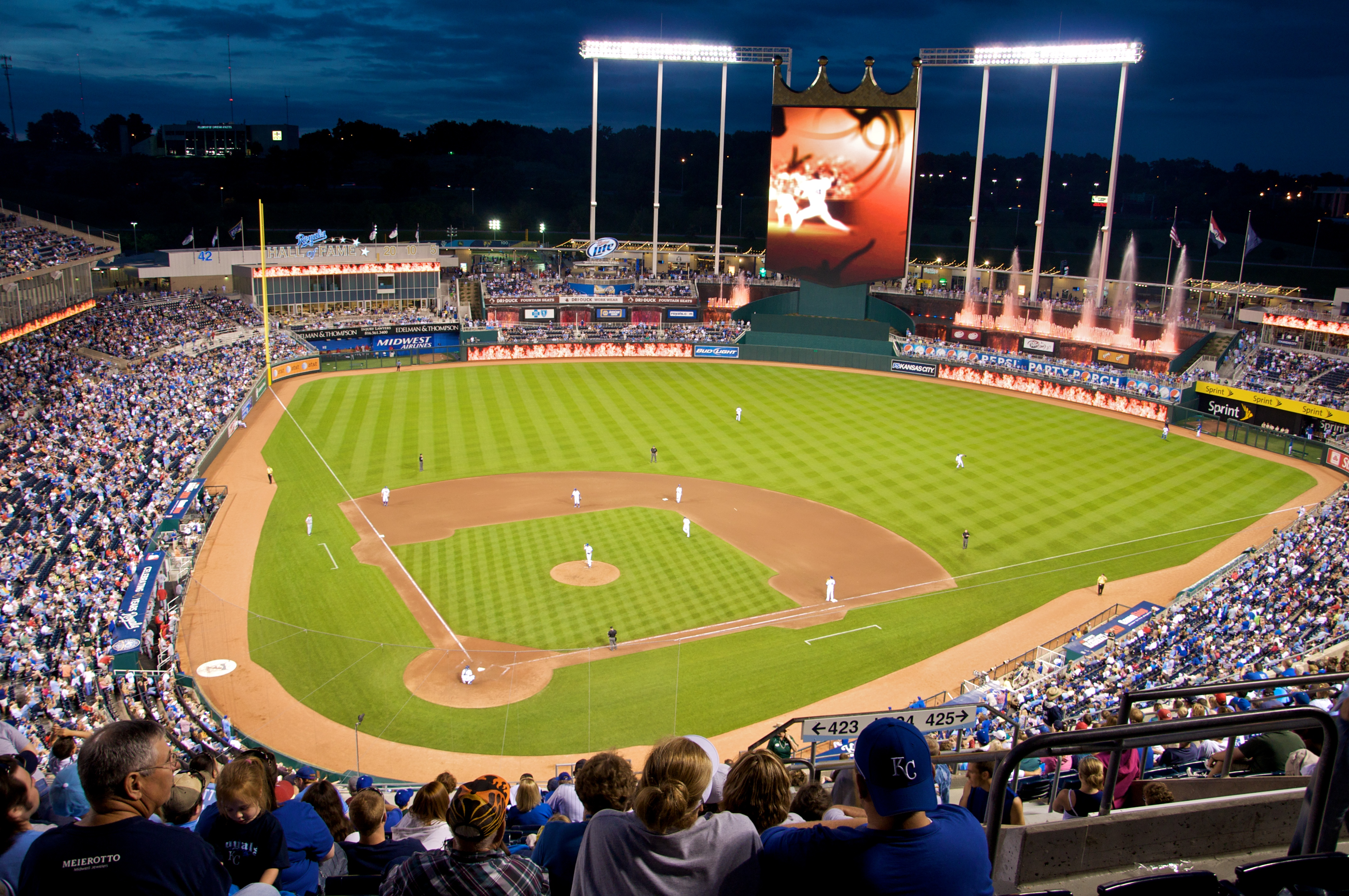
The 2017 Kansas City Royals season was held in Kauffman Stadium

The 2017 Kansas City Royals season was the 49th season for the franchise, and their 45th at Kauffman Stadium. The Royals opened the season at the Minnesota Twins on April 3, 2017, and finished the season at home against the Arizona Diamondbacks on October 1. They failed to make the playoffs for the second consecutive season.

== Offseason ==
=== Transactions ===
- November 3: C Drew Butera and RHP Peter Moylan elected free agency.
- November 4: RHP Edinson Vólquez, RHP Kris Medlen, and DH Kendrys Morales elected free agency.
- November 5: RHP Luke Hochevar elected free agency.
- November 18: C Tony Cruz designated for assignment. C Drew Butera signed. C Cam Gallagher, RHP Andrew Edwards, Jake Junis, and 1B Samir Dueñez signed from minors.
- November 23: C Tony Cruz released.
- December 1: RHP Brooks Pounders traded to the Los Angeles Angels for RHP Jared Ruxer.
- December 7: RHP Wade Davis traded to the Chicago Cubs for LF Jorge Soler
- January 3: RHP Sam Lewis traded to the Arizona Diamondbacks for LF Peter O'Brien.
- January 6: LF Jarrod Dyson traded to the Seattle Mariners for RHP Nate Karns.
- February 1: DH Brandon Moss signed.
- February 8: RHP Alec Mills traded to the Chicago Cubs for CF Donald Dewees Jr. RHP Jason Hammel signed.
- February 15: LHP Travis Wood signed.

=== Yordano Ventura ===
On the morning of January 22, 2017, it was announced that Kansas City Royals pitcher Yordano Ventura was killed in a car accident in the Dominican Republic.

== Regular season ==
The team's 16–4 win over the Detroit Tigers on July 20, 2017, was the first time in franchise history that the Royals had recorded four 4-run innings in a game. In the month of August, the Royals set a dubious franchise record of 45 innings without scoring a run, spanning more than 4 games. It was the longest such streak by any team since the pitching mound was lowered in the late 1960s.

=== Game log ===
2017 game log: 80–82 (Home: 43–38; Away: 37–44)
April: 7–16 (Home: 5–5; Away: 2–11)

| # | Date | Opponent | Score | Win | Loss | Save | Attendance | Record | Streak |
|---|---|---|---|---|---|---|---|---|---|
| 1 | April 3 | @ Twins | 1–7 | Santana (1–0) | **Strahm** (0–1) | — | 39,615 | 0–1 | L1 |
| 2 | April 5 | @ Twins | 1–9 | Santiago (1–0) | **Kennedy** (0–1) | — | 15,171 | 0–2 | L2 |
| 3 | April 6 | @ Twins | 3–5 | Rogers (1–0) | **Minor** (0–1) | Kintzler (1) | 16,078 | 0–3 | L3 |
| 4 | April 7 | @ Astros | 5–1 | **Vargas** (1–0) | Fiers (0–1) | — | 30,491 | 1–3 | W1 |
| 5 | April 8 | @ Astros | 7–3 | **Duffy** (1–0) | Gregerson (0–1) | — | 35,373 | 2–3 | W2 |
| 6 | April 9 | @ Astros | 4–5 (12) | Devenski (1–0) | **Strahm** (0–2) | — | 32,411 | 2–4 | L1 |
| 7 | April 10 | A's | 0–2 | Cotton (1–1) | **Kennedy** (0–2) | Doolittle (1) | 40,019 | 2–5 | L2 |
| 8 | April 12 | A's | 3–8 | Triggs (2–0) | **Hammel** (0–1) | — | 24,380 | 2–6 | L3 |
| 9 | April 13 | A's | 3–1 | **Vargas** (2–0) | Hahn (0–1) | **Herrera** (1) | 22,160 | 3–6 | W1 |
| 10 | April 14 | Angels | 7–1 | **Duffy** (2–0) | Ramírez (2–1) | — | 26,838 | 4–6 | W2 |
| 11 | April 15 | Angels | 3–2 | **Soria** (1–0) | Alvarez (0–1) | **Herrera** (2) | 24,162 | 5–6 | W3 |
| 12 | April 16 | Angels | 1–0 | **Herrera** (1–0) | Parker (0–1) | — | 27,950 | 6–6 | W4 |
| 13 | April 18 | Giants | 2–1 (11) | Law (1–0) | **Alexander** (0–1) | Melancon (3) | 20,863 | 6–7 | L1 |
| 14 | April 19 | Giants | 2–0 | **Vargas** (3–0) | Bumgarner (0–3) | **Herrera** (3) | 24,402 | 7–7 | W1 |
| 15 | April 20 | @ Rangers | 0–1 (13) | Álvarez (1–0) | **Wood** (0–1) | — | 26,898 | 7–8 | L1 |
| 16 | April 21 | @ Rangers | 2–6 | Hamels (1–0) | **Karns** (0–1) | — | 31,320 | 7–9 | L2 |
| 17 | April 22 | @ Rangers | 1–2 | Bush (1–0) | **Wood** (0–2) | — | 41,446 | 7–10 | L3 |
| 18 | April 23 | @ Rangers | 2–5 | Darvish (2–2) | **Hammel** (0–2) | Bush (1) | 37,177 | 7–11 | L4 |
| 19 | April 24 | @ White Sox | 1–12 | González (3–0) | **Vargas** (3–1) | — | 11,484 | 7–12 | L5 |
| 20 | April 25 | @ White Sox | 5–10 | Jennings (2–0) | **Duffy** (2–1) | — | 14,591 | 7–13 | L6 |
| 21 | April 26 | @ White Sox | 2–5 | Quintana (1–4) | **Karns** (0–2) | Robertson (5) | 18,218 | 7–14 | L7 |
| 22 | April 28 | Twins | 4–6 | Breslow (1–0) | **Soria** (1–1) | Kintzler (6) | 27,911 | 7–15 | L8 |
| — | April 29 | Twins | **Postponed (rain)** (Rescheduled for July 1st) | | | | | | |
| 23 | April 30 | Twins | 5–7 | Hughes (4–1) | **Hammel** (0–3) | Kintzler (7) | 32,685 | 7–16 | L9 |

May: 15–14 (Home: 8–8; Away: 7–6)

| # | Date | Opponent | Score | Win | Loss | Save | Attendance | Record | Streak |
|---|---|---|---|---|---|---|---|---|---|
| 24 | May 1 | White Sox | 6–1 | **Vargas** (4–1) | Covey (0–2) | — | 20,148 | 8–16 | W1 |
| 25 | May 2 | White Sox | 0–6 | Quintana (2–4) | **Duffy** (2–2) | — | 18,604 | 8–17 | L1 |
| 26 | May 3 | White Sox | 6–1 | **Karns** (1–2) | Pelfrey (0–2) | — | 22,298 | 9–17 | W1 |
| 27 | May 4 | White Sox | 3–8 | Holland (3–2) | **Kennedy** (0–3) | — | 36,525 | 9–18 | L1 |
| 28 | May 5 | Indians | 3–1 | **Hammel** (1–3) | Salazar (2–3) | **Herrera** (4) | 25,722 | 10–18 | W1 |
| 29 | May 6 | Indians | 1–3 | Miller (2–0) | **Herrera** (1–1) | Allen (8) | 23,743 | 10–19 | L1 |
| 30 | May 7 | Indians | 0–1 | Clevinger (1–0) | **Duffy** (2–3) | Allen (9) | 25,754 | 10–20 | L2 |
| 31 | May 8 | @ Rays | 7–3 | **Karns** (2–2) | Snell (0–3) | — | 12,826 | 11–20 | W1 |
| 32 | May 9 | @ Rays | 7–6 (12) | **Junis** (1–0) | Moreno (0–1) | **Herrera** (5) | 9,921 | 12–20 | W2 |
| 33 | May 10 | @ Rays | 1–12 | Archer (3–1) | **Hammel** (1–4) | — | 9,320 | 12–21 | L1 |
| 34 | May 11 | @ Rays | 6–0 | **Vargas** (5–1) | Odorizzi (2–2) | — | 9,340 | 13–21 | W1 |
| 35 | May 12 | Orioles | 3–2 | **Soria** (2–1) | Nuño (0–1) | **Herrera** (6) | 25,467 | 14–21 | W2 |
| 36 | May 13 | Orioles | 4–3 | **Maness** (1–0) | Asher (1–2) | **Herrera** (7) | 24,662 | 15–21 | W3 |
| 37 | May 14 | Orioles | 9–8 | **Strahm** (1–2) | Bleier (0–1) | **Herrera** (8) | 30,662 | 16–21 | W4 |
| 38 | May 16 | Yankees | 1–7 | Sabathia (3–2) | **Hammel** (1–5) | — | 30,878 | 16–22 | L1 |
| 39 | May 17 | Yankees | 7–11 | Pineda (4–2) | **Vargas** (5–2) | Betances (1) | 22,899 | 16–23 | L2 |
| 40 | May 18 | Yankees | 5–1 | **Duffy** (3–3) | Montgomery (2–3) | — | 22,803 | 17–23 | W1 |
| 41 | May 19 | @ Twins | 3–4 (10) | Kintzler (2–0) | **Alburquerque** (0–1) | — | 23,553 | 17–24 | L1 |
| — | May 20 | @ Twins | **Postponed (rain)** (Rescheduled for May 21) | | | | | | |
| 42 | May 21 | @ Twins | 6–4 | **Minor** (1–1) | Hughes (4–3) | **Herrera** (9) | | 18–24 | W1 |
| 43 | May 21 | @ Twins | 4–8 | Mejía (1–1) | **Kennedy** (0–4) | — | 27,852 | 18–25 | L1 |
| 44 | May 22 | @ Yankees | 2–4 | Pineda (5–2) | **Vargas** (5–3) | Betances (3) | 35,005 | 18–26 | L2 |
| 45 | May 23 | @ Yankees | 6–2 | **Duffy** (4–3) | Warren (1–1) | — | 35,931 | 19–26 | W1 |
| 46 | May 24 | @ Yankees | 0–3 | Severino (3–2) | **Hammel** (1–6) | Betances (4) | 34,610 | 19–27 | L1 |
| — | May 25 | @ Yankees | **Postponed (rain)** (Rescheduled for September 25) | | | | | | |
| 47 | May 26 | @ Indians | 6–4 | **Minor** (2–1) | Shaw (1–1) | **Herrera** (10) | 29,603 | 20–27 | W1 |
| 48 | May 27 | @ Indians | 5–2 | **Vargas** (6–3) | Salazar (3–5) | **Herrera** (11) | 30,920 | 21–27 | W2 |
| 49 | May 28 | @ Indians | 1–10 | Tomlin (3–6) | **Duffy** (4–4) | — | 23,136 | 21–28 | L1 |
| 50 | May 29 | Tigers | 7–10 | Rodríguez (2–5) | **Soria** (2–2) | Wilson (4) | 28,419 | 21–29 | L2 |
| 51 | May 30 | Tigers | 1–0 | **Skoglund** (1–0) | Verlander (4–4) | **Herrera** (12) | 21,864 | 22–29 | W1 |
| 52 | May 31 | Tigers | 5–6 | Saupold (1–0) | **Kennedy** (0–5) | Wilson (5) | 24,347 | 22–30 | L1 |

June: 17–9 (Home: 9–5; Away: 8–4)

| # | Date | Opponent | Score | Win | Loss | Save | Attendance | Record | Streak |
|---|---|---|---|---|---|---|---|---|---|
| 53 | June 2 | Indians | 4–0 | **Vargas** (7–3) | Tomlin (3–7) | — | 33,408 | 23–30 | W1 |
| 54 | June 3 | Indians | 12–5 | **Hammel** (2–6) | Carrasco (5–3) | — | 26,497 | 24–30 | W2 |
| 55 | June 4 | Indians | 0–8 | Otero (1–0) | **Skoglund** (1–1) | — | 28,185 | 24–31 | L1 |
| 56 | June 5 | Astros | 3–7 | Fiers (2–2) | **Kennedy** (0–6) | — | 21,892 | 24–32 | L2 |
| 57 | June 6 | Astros | 9–7 | **Minor** (3–1) | Giles (1–2) | — | 20,974 | 25–32 | W1 |
| 58 | June 7 | Astros | 7–5 | **Vargas** (8–3) | Díaz (0–1) | **Herrera** (13) | 25,628 | 26–32 | W2 |
| 59 | June 8 | Astros | 1–6 | Harris (2–1) | **Herrera** (1–2) | — | 32,747 | 26–33 | L1 |
| 60 | June 9 | @ Padres | 3–6 | Chacín (5–5) | **Strahm** (1–3) | Maurer (10) | 23,055 | 26–34 | L2 |
| 61 | June 10 | @ Padres | 12–6 | **Wood** (1–2) | Hand (1–4) | — | 26,107 | 27–34 | W1 |
| 62 | June 11 | @ Padres | 8–3 | **Junis** (2–0) | Lamet (2–2) | — | 25,599 | 28–34 | W2 |
| 63 | June 13 | @ Giants | 8–1 | **Vargas** (9–3) | Blach (4–4) | — | 41,284 | 29–34 | W3 |
| 64 | June 14 | @ Giants | 7–2 | **Hammel** (3–6) | Cueto (5–6) | — | 41,144 | 30–34 | W4 |
| 65 | June 15 | @ Angels | 7–2 | **Strahm** (2–3) | Nolasco (2–8) | — | 34,884 | 31–34 | W5 |
| 66 | June 16 | @ Angels | 3–1 | **Kennedy** (1–6) | Chavez (5–7) | **Herrera** (14) | 34,184 | 32–34 | W6 |
| 67 | June 17 | @ Angels | 0–9 | Meyer (3–3) | **Junis** (2–1) | — | 41,209 | 32–35 | L1 |
| 68 | June 18 | @ Angels | 7–3 | **Vargas** (10–3) | Ramirez (6–5) | **Herrera** (15) | 40,178 | 33–35 | W1 |
| 69 | June 19 | Red Sox | 4–2 | **Hammel** (4–6) | Boyer (0–1) | **Herrera** (16) | 27,992 | 34–35 | W2 |
| 70 | June 20 | Red Sox | 3–8 | Sale (9–3) | **Strahm** (2–4) | — | 25,983 | 34–36 | L1 |
| 71 | June 21 | Red Sox | 6–4 | **Soria** (3–2) | Scott (0–1) | **Herrera** (17) | 30,826 | 35–36 | W1 |
| 72 | June 23 | Blue Jays | 5–4 | **Soria** (4–2) | Loup (2–1) | — | 38,848 | 36–36 | W2 |
| 72 | June 24 | Blue Jays | 3–2 | **Vargas** (11–3) | Estrada (4–6) | **Herrera** (18) | 26,938 | 37–36 | W3 |
| 74 | June 25 | Blue Jays | 2–8 | Liriano (4–3) | **Alexander** (0–2) | — | 37,182 | 37–37 | L1 |
| 75 | June 27 | @ Tigers | 3–5 | Verlander (5–4) | **Strahm** (2–5) | J. Wilson (7) | 29,488 | 37–38 | L2 |
| 76 | June 28 | @ Tigers | 8–2 | **Kennedy** (2–6) | Norris (4–6) | — | 29,614 | 38–38 | W1 |
| 77 | June 29 | @ Tigers | 3–7 | Fulmer (7–6) | **Junis** (2–2) | — | 33,681 | 38–39 | L1 |
| 78 | June 30 | Twins | 8–1 | **Vargas** (12–3) | Santana (10–5) | — | 34,332 | 39–39 | W1 |

July: 16–10 (Home: 8–5; Away: 8–5)

| # | Date | Opponent | Score | Win | Loss | Save | Attendance | Record | Streak |
|---|---|---|---|---|---|---|---|---|---|
| 79 | July 1 (1) | Twins | 11–6 | **Minor** (4–1) | Duffey (0–2) | — | 25,571 | 40–39 | W2 |
| 80 | July 1 (2) | Twins | 5–10 | Jorge (1–0) | **Hammel** (4–7) | — | 32,448 | 40–40 | L1 |
| 81 | July 2 | Twins | 6–2 | **Alexander** (1–2) | Santiago (4–8) | — | 28,775 | 41–40 | W1 |
| 82 | July 3 | @ Mariners | 3–1 | **Kennedy** (3–6) | Moore (1–1) | **Soria** (1) | 35,789 | 42–40 | W2 |
| 83 | July 4 | @ Mariners | 7–3 | **Duffy** (5–4) | Hernandez (3–3) | — | 25,555 | 43–40 | W3 |
| 84 | July 5 | @ Mariners | 9–6 | **Minor** (7–5) | Pazos (2–2) | **Herrera** (19) | 15,157 | 44–40 | W4 |
| 85 | July 7 | @ Dodgers | 1–4 | Maeda (7–4) | **Hammel** (4–8) | Jansen (21) | 48,017 | 44–41 | L1 |
| 86 | July 8 | @ Dodgers | 4–5 (10) | Stripling (1–3) | **Alexander** (1–3) | — | 45,225 | 44–42 | L2 |
| 87 | July 9 | @ Dodgers | 2–5 | Kershaw (14–2) | **Duffy** (5–5) | — | 41,524 | 44–43 | L3 |
**88th All-Star Game in Miami, Florida**
| 88 | July 14 | Rangers | 3–5 | Pérez (5–6) | **Minor** (5–2) | Claudio (2) | 35,591 | 44–44 | L4 |
| 89 | July 15 | Rangers | 0–1 | Leclerc (2–2) | **Duffy** (5–6) | Claudio (3) | 32,907 | 44–45 | L5 |
| 90 | July 16 | Rangers | 4–3 | **Herrera** (2–2) | Grilli (2–5) | — | 23,163 | 45–45 | W1 |
| 91 | July 17 | Tigers | 2–10 | Zimmermann (6–7) | **Vargas** (12–4) | — | 26,359 | 45–46 | L1 |
| 92 | July 18 | Tigers | 3–9 | Boyd (3–5) | **Wood** (1–3) | — | 22,908 | 45–47 | L2 |
| 93 | July 19 | Tigers | 4–3 | **McCarthy** (1–0) | J. Wilson (3–4) | — | 30,105 | 46–47 | W1 |
| 94 | July 20 | Tigers | 16–4 | **Duffy** (6–6) | Fulmer (10–7) | — | 29,018 | 47–47 | W2 |
| 95 | July 21 | White Sox | 7–6 (10) | **Feliz** (2–5) | Clippard (1–6) | — | 29,647 | 48–47 | W3 |
| 96 | July 22 | White Sox | 7–2 | **Alexander** (2–3) | Holmberg (1–3) | — | 34,088 | 49–47 | W4 |
| 97 | July 23 | White Sox | 5–4 | **Herrera** (3–2) | Infante (0–1) | — | 23,184 | 50–47 | W5 |
| 98 | July 24 | @ Tigers | 5–3 (12) | **Junis** (3–2) | VerHagen (0–1) | **Herrera** (20) | 26,415 | 51–47 | W6 |
| 99 | July 25 | @ Tigers | 3–1 | **Duffy** (7–6) | Fulmer (10–8) | **Herrera** (21) | 27,259 | 52–47 | W7 |
| 100 | July 26 | @ Tigers | 16–2 | **Kennedy** (4–6) | Sánchez (2–1) | — | 29,073 | 53–47 | W8 |
| 101 | July 28 | @ Red Sox | 4–2 | **Vargas** (13–4) | Porcello (4–14) | **Herrera** (22) | 37,321 | 54–47 | W9 |
| 102 | July 29 | @ Red Sox | 8–9 (10) | Barnes (6–2) | **Minor** (5–3) | — | 36,912 | 54–48 | L1 |
| 103 | July 30 | @ Red Sox | 5–3 | **Hammel** (5–8) | Barnes (6–3) | **Herrera** (23) | 36,480 | 55–48 | W1 |
| 104 | July 31 | @ Orioles | 1–2 | Britton (1–0) | Soria (4–3) | — | 20,663 | 55–49 | L1 |

August: 10–18 (Home: 6–9; Away: 4–9)

| # | Date | Opponent | Score | Win | Loss | Save | Attendance | Record | Streak |
|---|---|---|---|---|---|---|---|---|---|
| 105 | August 1 | @ Orioles | 2–7 | Bundy (10–8) | **Kennedy** (4–7) | — | 20,931 | 55–50 | L2 |
| 106 | August 2 | @ Orioles | 0–6 | Hellickson (7–5) | **Vargas** (13–5) | — | 14,984 | 55–51 | L3 |
| 107 | August 3 | Mariners | 6–4 | **Buchter** (4–3) | Pagan (0–2) | **Herrera** (24) | 29,228 | 56–51 | W1 |
| 108 | August 4 | Mariners | 2–5 | Paxton (12–3) | **Hammel** (5–9) | Diaz (22) | 38,130 | 56–52 | L1 |
| — | August 5 | Mariners | | PPD, RAIN; Rescheduled for August 6 | | | | | |
| 109 | August 6 | Mariners | 7–8 | Pazos (3–3) | **Duffy** (7–7) | Díaz (23) | | 56–53 | L2 |
| 110 | August 6 | Mariners | 9–1 | **Junis** (4–2) | Ramírez (4–4) | — | 29,432 | 57–53 | W1 |
| 111 | August 7 | Cardinals | 3–11 | Martinez (8–9) | **Kennedy** (4–8) | — | 38,478 | 57–54 | L1 |
| 112 | August 8 | Cardinals | 3–10 | Wacha (9–4) | **Vargas** (13–6) | — | 37,267 | 57–55 | L2 |
| 113 | August 9 | @ Cardinals | 5–8 | Bowman (3–4) | **Maurer** (1–5) | Rosenthal (9) | 44,139 | 57–56 | L3 |
| 114 | August 10 | @ Cardinals | 6–8 | Lyons (1–0) | **Minor** (5–4) | Rosenthal (10) | 41,706 | 57–57 | L4 |
| 115 | August 11 | @ White Sox | 3–6 | Bummer (1–2) | **Duffy** (7–8) | Clippard (3) | 18,137 | 57–58 | L5 |
| 116 | August 12 | @ White Sox | 5–4 | **Alexander** (3–3) | Bummer (1–3) | **Herrera** (25) | 20,413 | 58–58 | W1 |
| 117 | August 13 | @ White Sox | 14–6 | **Vargas** (14–6) | Holland (6–12) | — | 27,351 | 59–58 | W2 |
| 118 | August 14 | @ A's | 6–2 | **Junis** (5–2) | Cotton (5–10) | — | 9,848 | 60–58 | W3 |
| 119 | August 15 | @ A's | 8–10 | Treinen (1–2) | **Minor** (5–5) | — | 13,875 | 60–59 | L1 |
| 120 | August 16 | @ A's | 7–6 | **Maurer** (2–5) | Treinen (1–3) | **Herrera** (26) | 15,239 | 61–59 | W1 |
| 121 | August 18 | Indians | 1–10 | Kluber (12–3) | **Kennedy** (4–9) | — | 35,974 | 61–60 | L1 |
| 122 | August 19 | Indians | 0–5 | Bauer (12–8) | Vargas (14–7) | — | 34,204 | 61–61 | L2 |
| 123 | August 20 | Indians | 7–4 | **Hammel** (6–9) | Salazar (5–6) | — | 27,417 | 62–61 | W1 |
| 124 | August 22 | Rockies | 3–2 | **Duffy** (8–8) | Gray (5–3) | **Alexander** (1) | 22,868 | 63–61 | W2 |
| 125 | August 23 | Rockies | 6–4 | **Maurer** (3–5) | Holland (2–5) | — | 25,752 | 64–61 | W3 |
| 126 | August 24 | Rockies | 2–3 | Ottavino (2–3) | **Minor** (5–6) | Holland (36) | 25,314 | 64–62 | L1 |
| 127 | August 25 | @ Indians | 0–4 | Merritt (1–0) | **Vargas** (14–8) | — | 34,061 | 64–63 | L2 |
| 128 | August 26 | @ Indians | 0–4 | Clevinger (7–5) | **Hammel** (6–10) | — | 34,273 | 64–64 | L3 |
| 129 | August 27 | @ Indians | 0–12 | Carrasco (13–6) | **Skoglund** (1–2) | — | 32,229 | 64–65 | L4 |
| 130 | August 28 | Rays | 0–12 | Pruitt (7–3) | **Kennedy** (4–10) | Andriese (1) | 21,866 | 64–66 | L5 |
| 131 | August 29 | Rays | 6–2 | **Junis** (6–2) | Cobb (9–9) | — | 25,204 | 65–66 | W1 |
| 132 | August 30 | Rays | 3–5 | Odorizzi (7–7) | **Vargas** (14–9) | Colomé (40) | 25,916 | 65–67 | L1 |

September/October: 15–15 (Home: 7–6; Away: 8–9)

| # | Date | Opponent | Score | Win | Loss | Save | Attendance | Record | Streak |
|---|---|---|---|---|---|---|---|---|---|
| 133 | September 1 | @ Twins | 7–6 | **Hammel** (7–10) | Gee (1–2) | **Alexander** (2) | 24,068 | 66–67 | W1 |
| 134 | September 2 | @ Twins | 0–17 | Gibson (9–10) | **Garcia** (0–1) | — | 33,413 | 66–68 | L1 |
| 135 | September 3 | @ Twins | 5–4 | **Alexander** (4–3) | Busenitz (1–1) | **Maurer** (21) | 32,234 | 67–68 | W1 |
| 136 | September 4 | @ Tigers | 7–6 | **Junis** (7–2) | Lewicki (0–1) | **Alexander** (3) | 24,804 | 68–68 | W3 |
| 137 | September 5 | @ Tigers | 2–13 | Jaye (1–0) | **Vargas** (14–10) | — | , | 68–69 | L1 |
| 138 | September 6 | @ Tigers | 13–2 | **Hammel** (8–10) | Boyd (5–9) | — | 23,755 | 69–69 | W1 |
| 139 | September 7 | Twins | 2–4 | Hildenberger (3–2) | **Herrera** (3–3) | Belisle (6) | 26,485 | 69–70 | L1 |
| 140 | September 8 | Twins | 5–8 | Santana (8–5) | **Kennedy** (4–11) | Belisle (7) | 31,879 | 69–71 | L2 |
| 141 | September 9 | Twins | 5–2 | **Minor** (6–6) | Pressly (2–3) | **Maurer** (2) | 29,991 | 70–71 | W1 |
| 142 | September 10 | Twins | 11–3 | **Vargas** (15–10) | Colón (6–12) | — | 35,003 | 71–71 | W2 |
| 143 | September 11 | White Sox | 3–11 | López (1–3) | **Hammel** (8–11) | — | 23,135 | 71–72 | L1 |
| 144 | September 12 | White Sox | 4–3 | **Gaviglio** (4–5) | Covey (0–5) | **Alexander** (4) | 17,727 | 72–72 | W1 |
| 145 | September 13 | White Sox | 3–5 | Minaya (3–2) | **Alexander** (4–4) | — | 25,665 | 72–73 | L1 |
| 146 | September 14 | @ Indians | 2–3 (10) | Allen (3–6) | **Maurer** (3–6) | — | 30,874 | 72–74 | L2 |
| 147 | September 15 | @ Indians | 4–3 | **Vargas** (16–10) | Bauer (16–9) | **Minor** (1) | 34,025 | 73–74 | W1 |
| 148 | September 16 | @ Indians | 4–8 | Carrasco (16–6) | **Hammel** (8–12) | — | 33,688 | 73–75 | L1 |
| 149 | September 17 | @ Indians | 2–3 | Kluber (17–4) | **Duffy** (8–9) | Allen (28) | 32,313 | 73–76 | L2 |
| 150 | September 19 | @ Blue Jays | 2–5 | Stroman (12–8) | **Kennedy** (4–12) | Osuna (37) | 33,554 | 73–77 | L3 |
| 151 | September 20 | @ Blue Jays | 15–5 | **Junis** (8–2) | Anderson (1–2) | — | 33,050 | 74–77 | W1 |
| 152 | September 21 | @ Blue Jays | 1–0 | **Vargas** (17–10) | Happ (9–11) | **Minor** (2) | 35,861 | 75–77 | W2 |
| 153 | September 22 | @ White Sox | 6–7 | López (3–3) | **Hammel** (8–13) | Minaya (6) | 18,041 | 75–78 | L1 |
| 154 | September 23 | @ White Sox | 8–2 | **Duffy** (9–9) | Covey (0–7) | — | 20,306 | 76–78 | W1 |
| 155 | September 24 | @ White Sox | 1–8 | Giolito (3–3) | **Kennedy** (4–13) | — | 18,791 | 76–79 | L1 |
| 156 | September 25 | @ Yankees | 3–11 | Sabathia (13–5) | **Junis** (8–3) | — | 40,023 | 76–80 | L2 |
| 157 | September 26 | Tigers | 2–1 | **Vargas** (18–10) | Sánchez (3–6) | **Minor** (3) | 20,613 | 77–80 | W1 |
| 158 | September 27 | Tigers | 7–4 | **Alexander** (5–4) | VerHagen (0–3) | **Minor** (4) | 21,319 | 78–80 | W2 |
| 159 | September 28 | Tigers | 1–4 | Norris (5–8) | **Duffy** (9–10) | Greene (8) | 21,650 | 78–81 | L1 |
| 160 | September 29 | D-Backs | 2–1 | **Kennedy** (5–13) | Greinke (17–7) | **Minor** (5) | 23,488 | 79–81 | W1 |
| 161 | September 30 | D-Backs | 4–3 | **Junis** (9–3) | Bradley (3–3) | **Minor** (6) | 32,727 | 80–81 | W2 |
| 162 | October 1 | D-Backs | 2–14 | Banda (2–3) | **Vargas** (18–11) | — | 32,277 | 80–82 | L1 |

Legend: = Win = Loss = Postponement
Bold = Royals team member

== Season standings ==
=== American League Central ===
AL Central
| Team | W | L | Pct. | GB | Home | Road |
|---|---|---|---|---|---|---|
| Cleveland Indians | 102 | 60 | .630 | — | 49‍–‍32 | 53‍–‍28 |
| Minnesota Twins | 85 | 77 | .525 | 17 | 41‍–‍40 | 44‍–‍37 |
| Kansas City Royals | 80 | 82 | .494 | 22 | 43‍–‍38 | 37‍–‍44 |
| Chicago White Sox | 67 | 95 | .414 | 35 | 39‍–‍42 | 28‍–‍53 |
| Detroit Tigers | 64 | 98 | .395 | 38 | 34‍–‍47 | 30‍–‍51 |

=== American League Wild Card ===
Division leaders
| Team | W | L | Pct. |
|---|---|---|---|
| Cleveland Indians | 102 | 60 | .630 |
| Houston Astros | 101 | 61 | .623 |
| Boston Red Sox | 93 | 69 | .574 |

Wild Card teams (Top 2 teams qualify for postseason)
| Team | W | L | Pct. | GB |
|---|---|---|---|---|
| New York Yankees | 91 | 71 | .562 | +6 |
| Minnesota Twins | 85 | 77 | .525 | — |
| Kansas City Royals | 80 | 82 | .494 | 5 |
| Los Angeles Angels | 80 | 82 | .494 | 5 |
| Tampa Bay Rays | 80 | 82 | .494 | 5 |
| Seattle Mariners | 78 | 84 | .481 | 7 |
| Texas Rangers | 78 | 84 | .481 | 7 |
| Toronto Blue Jays | 76 | 86 | .469 | 9 |
| Baltimore Orioles | 75 | 87 | .463 | 10 |
| Oakland Athletics | 75 | 87 | .463 | 10 |
| Chicago White Sox | 67 | 95 | .414 | 18 |
| Detroit Tigers | 64 | 98 | .395 | 21 |

=== Record against opponents ===
2017 American League record Source: MLB Standings Grid – 2017
| Team | BAL | BOS | CWS | CLE | DET | HOU | KC | LAA | MIN | NYY | OAK | SEA | TB | TEX | TOR | NL |
|---|---|---|---|---|---|---|---|---|---|---|---|---|---|---|---|---|
| Baltimore | — | 10–9 | 4–3 | 1–6 | 3–4 | 1–5 | 3–3 | 2–4 | 2–5 | 7–12 | 4–3 | 4–2 | 8–11 | 6–1 | 12–7 | 8–12 |
| Boston | 9–10 | — | 6–1 | 4–3 | 3–4 | 3–4 | 2–4 | 2–4 | 5–2 | 8–11 | 3–4 | 3–3 | 11–8 | 5–1 | 13–6 | 16–4 |
| Chicago | 3–4 | 1–6 | — | 6–13 | 10–9 | 4–2 | 10–9 | 3–4 | 7–12 | 3–4 | 1–5 | 3–4 | 3–3 | 4–3 | 3–3 | 6–14 |
| Cleveland | 6–1 | 3–4 | 13–6 | — | 13–6 | 5–1 | 12–7 | 6–0 | 12–7 | 5–2 | 3–4 | 4–2 | 4–3 | 6–1 | 4–2 | 6–14 |
| Detroit | 4–3 | 4–3 | 9–10 | 6–13 | — | 3–4 | 8–11 | 3–4 | 8–11 | 3–3 | 1–5 | 1–6 | 2–5 | 1–5 | 3–3 | 8–12 |
| Houston | 5–1 | 4–3 | 2–4 | 1–5 | 4–3 | — | 3–4 | 12–7 | 5–1 | 5–2 | 12–7 | 14–5 | 3–4 | 12–7 | 4–3 | 15–5 |
| Kansas City | 3–3 | 4–2 | 9–10 | 7–12 | 11–8 | 4–3 | — | 6–1 | 8–11 | 2–5 | 3–3 | 5–2 | 4–3 | 1–6 | 3–3 | 9–11 |
| Los Angeles | 4–2 | 4–2 | 4–3 | 0–6 | 4–3 | 7–12 | 1–6 | — | 2–5 | 4–2 | 12–7 | 12–7 | 3–4 | 8–11 | 4–3 | 11–9 |
| Minnesota | 5–2 | 2–5 | 12–7 | 7–12 | 11–8 | 1–5 | 11–8 | 5–2 | — | 2–4 | 3–3 | 3–4 | 2–4 | 4–3 | 4–3 | 13–7 |
| New York | 12–7 | 11–8 | 4–3 | 2–5 | 3–3 | 2–5 | 5–2 | 2–4 | 4–2 | — | 2–5 | 5–2 | 12–7 | 3–3 | 9–10 | 15–5 |
| Oakland | 3–4 | 4–3 | 5–1 | 4–3 | 5–1 | 7–12 | 3–3 | 7–12 | 3–3 | 5–2 | — | 7–12 | 2–5 | 10–9 | 2–5 | 7–13 |
| Seattle | 2–4 | 3–3 | 4–3 | 2–4 | 6–1 | 5–14 | 2–5 | 7–12 | 4–3 | 2–5 | 12–7 | — | 5–1 | 11–8 | 1–6 | 12–8 |
| Tampa Bay | 11–8 | 8–11 | 3–3 | 3–4 | 5–2 | 4–3 | 3–4 | 4–3 | 4–2 | 7–12 | 5–2 | 1–5 | — | 2–4 | 9–10 | 11–9 |
| Texas | 1–6 | 1–5 | 3–4 | 1–6 | 5–1 | 7–12 | 6–1 | 11–8 | 3–4 | 3–3 | 9–10 | 8–11 | 4–2 | — | 3–4 | 14–6 |
| Toronto | 7–12 | 6–13 | 3–3 | 2–4 | 3–3 | 3–4 | 3–3 | 3–4 | 3–4 | 10–9 | 5–2 | 6–1 | 10–9 | 4–3 | — | 9–11 |

== Roster ==
2017 Kansas City Royals
Roster
| Pitchers: 62 Al Alburquerque; 54 Scott Alexander; 50 Miguel Almonte; 49 Ryan Buchter; 34 Trevor Cahill; 41 Danny Duffy; 59 Luke Farrell; 43 Neftalí Feliz; 33 Brian Flynn; 64 Onelki García; 62 Sam Gaviglio; 44 Jason Hammel; 40 Kelvin Herrera; 65 Jake Junis; 55 Nate Karns; 31 Ian Kennedy; 59 Andrés Machado; 63 Seth Maness; 32 Brandon Maurer; 61 Kevin McCarthy; 26 Mike Minor; 64 Mike Morin; 47 Peter Moylan; 53,69 Eric Skoglund; 48 Joakim Soria; 64 Matt Strahm; 51 Jason Vargas; 34 Travis Wood; 32 Chris Young | Catchers: 9 Drew Butera; 36 Cam Gallagher; 13 Salvador Perez; Infielders: 24 Christian Colón; 19 Cheslor Cuthbert; 2 Alcides Escobar; 35 Eric Hosmer; 15 Whit Merrifield; 27 Raúl Mondesí; 37 Brandon Moss; 8 Mike Moustakas; 46 Ramón Torres | Outfielders: 38 Jorge Bonifacio; 14 Billy Burns; 53 Melky Cabrera; 6 Lorenzo Cain; 4 Alex Gordon; 0 Terrance Gore; 16 Paulo Orlando; 12 Jorge Soler | Manager: 3 Ned Yost; Coaches: 44 Brian Buchanan (assistant hitting); 80 Ryan Eigsti (bullpen catcher); 58 Dave Eiland (pitching); 28 Pedro Grifol (catching); 57 Doug Henry (bullpen); 23 Mike Jirschele (third base/infield); 18 Rusty Kuntz (first base/outfield/baserunning); 21 Dale Sveum (hitting); 22 Don Wakamatsu (bench) |

== Player stats ==
=== Batting ===
Note: G = Games played; AB = At bats; R = Runs; H = Hits; 2B = Doubles; 3B = Triples; HR = Home runs; RBI = Runs batted in; SB = Stolen bases; BB = Walks; AVG = Batting average; SLG = Slugging average

| Player | G | AB | R | H | 2B | 3B | HR | RBI | SB | BB | AVG | SLG |
|---|---|---|---|---|---|---|---|---|---|---|---|---|
| Eric Hosmer | 162 | 603 | 98 | 192 | 31 | 1 | 25 | 94 | 6 | 66 | .318 | .498 |
| Alcides Escobar | 162 | 599 | 71 | 150 | 36 | 5 | 6 | 54 | 4 | 15 | .250 | .357 |
| Whit Merrifield | 145 | 587 | 80 | 169 | 32 | 6 | 19 | 78 | 34 | 29 | .288 | .460 |
| Lorenzo Cain | 155 | 584 | 86 | 175 | 27 | 5 | 15 | 49 | 26 | 54 | .300 | .440 |
| Mike Moustakas | 148 | 555 | 75 | 151 | 24 | 0 | 38 | 85 | 0 | 34 | .272 | .521 |
| Alex Gordon | 148 | 476 | 52 | 99 | 20 | 2 | 9 | 45 | 7 | 45 | .208 | .315 |
| Salvador Pérez | 129 | 471 | 57 | 126 | 24 | 1 | 27 | 80 | 1 | 17 | .268 | .495 |
| Jorge Bonifacio | 113 | 384 | 55 | 98 | 15 | 1 | 17 | 40 | 1 | 35 | .255 | .432 |
| Brandon Moss | 118 | 362 | 41 | 75 | 14 | 0 | 22 | 50 | 2 | 37 | .207 | .428 |
| Melky Cabrera | 58 | 223 | 24 | 60 | 13 | 2 | 4 | 29 | 1 | 11 | .269 | .399 |
| Drew Butera | 75 | 163 | 18 | 37 | 4 | 1 | 3 | 14 | 0 | 12 | .227 | .319 |
| Cheslor Cuthbert | 58 | 143 | 10 | 33 | 7 | 0 | 2 | 18 | 0 | 9 | .231 | .322 |
| Jorge Soler | 35 | 97 | 7 | 14 | 5 | 0 | 2 | 6 | 0 | 12 | .144 | .258 |
| Paulo Orlando | 39 | 86 | 9 | 17 | 3 | 0 | 2 | 6 | 1 | 1 | .198 | .302 |
| Ramón Torres | 33 | 74 | 9 | 18 | 3 | 0 | 0 | 4 | 1 | 4 | .243 | .284 |
| Adalberto Mondesí | 25 | 53 | 4 | 9 | 1 | 0 | 1 | 3 | 5 | 3 | .170 | .245 |
| Cam Gallagher | 13 | 24 | 2 | 6 | 1 | 0 | 1 | 5 | 0 | 3 | .250 | .417 |
| Christian Colón | 7 | 17 | 1 | 3 | 0 | 0 | 0 | 0 | 0 | 1 | .176 | .176 |
| Billy Burns | 7 | 6 | 1 | 1 | 0 | 0 | 0 | 0 | 0 | 0 | .167 | .167 |
| Terrance Gore | 12 | 4 | 2 | 0 | 0 | 0 | 0 | 0 | 2 | 1 | .000 | .000 |
| Pitcher totals | 162 | 25 | 0 | 3 | 0 | 0 | 0 | 0 | 0 | 1 | .120 | .120 |
| Team totals | 162 | 5536 | 702 | 1436 | 260 | 24 | 193 | 660 | 91 | 390 | .259 | .420 |

=== Pitching ===
Note: W = Wins; L = Losses; ERA = Earned run average; G = Games pitched; GS = Games started; SV = Saves; IP = Innings pitched; H = Hits allowed; R = Runs allowed; ER = Earned runs allowed; BB = Walks allowed; SO = Strikeouts

| Player | W | L | ERA | G | GS | SV | IP | H | R | ER | BB | SO |
|---|---|---|---|---|---|---|---|---|---|---|---|---|
| Jason Hammel | 8 | 13 | 5.29 | 32 | 32 | 0 | 180.1 | 209 | 109 | 106 | 48 | 145 |
| Jason Vargas | 18 | 11 | 4.16 | 32 | 32 | 0 | 179.2 | 181 | 84 | 83 | 58 | 134 |
| Ian Kennedy | 5 | 13 | 5.38 | 30 | 30 | 0 | 154.0 | 143 | 99 | 92 | 61 | 131 |
| Danny Duffy | 9 | 10 | 3.81 | 24 | 24 | 0 | 146.1 | 143 | 67 | 62 | 41 | 130 |
| Jakob Junis | 9 | 3 | 4.30 | 20 | 16 | 0 | 98.1 | 101 | 52 | 47 | 25 | 80 |
| Mike Minor | 6 | 6 | 2.55 | 65 | 0 | 6 | 77.2 | 57 | 23 | 22 | 22 | 88 |
| Scott Alexander | 5 | 4 | 2.48 | 58 | 0 | 4 | 69.0 | 62 | 23 | 19 | 28 | 59 |
| Kelvin Herrera | 3 | 3 | 4.25 | 64 | 0 | 26 | 59.1 | 60 | 33 | 28 | 20 | 56 |
| Peter Moylan | 0 | 0 | 3.49 | 79 | 0 | 0 | 59.1 | 40 | 26 | 23 | 25 | 46 |
| Joakim Soria | 4 | 3 | 3.70 | 59 | 0 | 1 | 56.0 | 49 | 24 | 23 | 20 | 64 |
| Nate Karns | 2 | 2 | 4.17 | 9 | 8 | 0 | 45.1 | 41 | 21 | 21 | 13 | 51 |
| Kevin McCarthy | 1 | 0 | 3.20 | 33 | 0 | 0 | 45.0 | 50 | 23 | 16 | 13 | 27 |
| Travis Wood | 1 | 3 | 6.91 | 28 | 3 | 0 | 41.2 | 56 | 33 | 32 | 20 | 29 |
| Matt Strahm | 2 | 5 | 5.45 | 24 | 3 | 0 | 34.2 | 30 | 22 | 21 | 22 | 37 |
| Chris Young | 0 | 0 | 7.50 | 14 | 2 | 0 | 30.0 | 47 | 27 | 25 | 14 | 22 |
| Ryan Buchter | 1 | 0 | 2.67 | 29 | 0 | 0 | 27.0 | 16 | 10 | 8 | 8 | 18 |
| Trevor Cahill | 0 | 0 | 8.22 | 10 | 3 | 0 | 23.0 | 33 | 21 | 21 | 21 | 15 |
| Brandon Maurer | 2 | 2 | 8.10 | 26 | 0 | 2 | 20.0 | 34 | 18 | 18 | 11 | 21 |
| Neftalí Feliz | 1 | 0 | 4.74 | 20 | 0 | 0 | 19.0 | 17 | 11 | 10 | 8 | 16 |
| Eric Skoglund | 1 | 2 | 9.50 | 7 | 5 | 0 | 18.0 | 30 | 20 | 19 | 12 | 14 |
| Sam Gaviglio | 1 | 0 | 3.00 | 4 | 2 | 0 | 12.0 | 13 | 4 | 4 | 5 | 9 |
| Al Alburquerque | 0 | 1 | 3.60 | 11 | 0 | 0 | 10.0 | 7 | 4 | 4 | 6 | 9 |
| Seth Maness | 1 | 0 | 3.72 | 8 | 0 | 0 | 9.2 | 16 | 5 | 4 | 2 | 4 |
| Onelki Garcia | 0 | 1 | 13.50 | 2 | 1 | 0 | 6.0 | 12 | 9 | 9 | 5 | 2 |
| Mike Morin | 0 | 0 | 7.94 | 6 | 0 | 0 | 5.2 | 8 | 5 | 5 | 3 | 6 |
| Andrés Machado | 0 | 0 | 22.09 | 2 | 0 | 0 | 3.2 | 10 | 9 | 9 | 3 | 1 |
| Luke Farrell | 0 | 0 | 16.88 | 1 | 1 | 0 | 2.2 | 7 | 5 | 5 | 3 | 2 |
| Brian Flynn | 0 | 0 | 3.86 | 1 | 0 | 0 | 2.1 | 3 | 1 | 1 | 0 | 0 |
| Miguel Almonte | 0 | 0 | 13.50 | 2 | 0 | 0 | 2.0 | 5 | 3 | 3 | 2 | 0 |
| Team totals | 80 | 82 | 4.61 | 162 | 162 | 39 | 1437.2 | 1480 | 791 | 737 | 519 | 1216 |

== Awards ==
First baseman Eric Hosmer won the Silver Slugger Award as the best offensive player at his position in the American League.

== Farm system ==
| Level | Team | League | Manager |
|---|---|---|---|
| AAA | Omaha Storm Chasers | Pacific Coast League | Brian Poldberg |
| AA | Northwest Arkansas Naturals | Texas League | Vance Wilson |
| A-Advanced | Wilmington Blue Rocks | Carolina League | Jamie Quirk |
| A | Lexington Legends | South Atlantic League | Scott Thorman |
| Rookie | Burlington Royals | Appalachian League | Omar Ramírez |
| Rookie | Idaho Falls Chukars | Pioneer League | Justin Gemoll |
| Rookie | AZL Royals | Arizona League | Darryl Kennedy |
| Rookie | DSL Royals | Dominican Summer League | Miguel Bernard |
