= Justin Haley =

Justin Haley may refer to:

- Justin Haley (baseball) (born 1991), American professional pitcher
- Justin Haley (racing driver) (born 1999), American stock car racing driver
