= Adam Wilk =

American baseball player (born 1987)

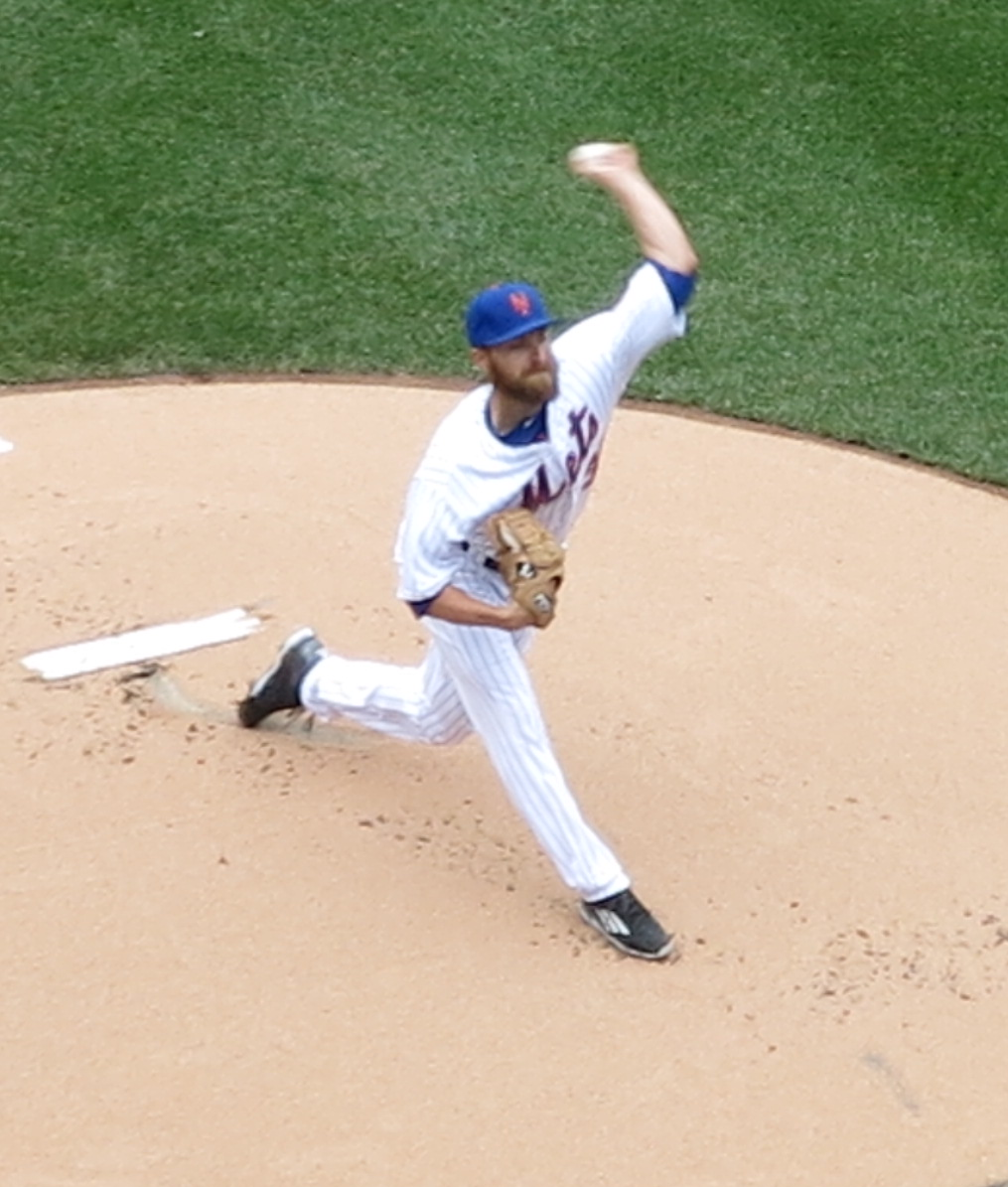
- Wilk with the New York Mets
- Pitcher
- Born: December 9, 1987 (age 38); Anaheim, California, U.S.
- Batted: Left Threw: Left

Professional debut
- MLB: May 26, 2011, for the Detroit Tigers
- KBO: April 2, 2013, for the NC Dinos

Last appearance
- MLB: June 17, 2017, for the Minnesota Twins
- KBO: September 29, 2013, for the NC Dinos

MLB statistics
- Win–loss record: 0–5
- Earned run average: 7.36
- Strikeouts: 27

KBO statistics
- Win–loss record: 4–8
- Earned run average: 4.12
- Strikeouts: 70
- Stats at Baseball Reference

Teams
- Detroit Tigers (2011–2012); NC Dinos (2013); Los Angeles Angels of Anaheim (2015); New York Mets (2017); Minnesota Twins (2017)

Adam Robert Wilk (born December 9, 1987) is an American former professional baseball pitcher. He played in Major League Baseball (MLB) for the Detroit Tigers, Los Angeles of Anaheim, New York Mets, and Minnesota Twins, and in the KBO League for the NC Dinos.

== Amateur career ==
Wilk graduated from Cypress High School in Cypress, California, then attended Long Beach State, and in 2007 played for the Newport Gulls of the NECBL. He still holds the team records for lowest opponent batting average (.153) and fewest hits allowed (25). In 2008, he played collegiate summer baseball with the Orleans Cardinals of the Cape Cod Baseball League and was named a league all-star.

== Professional career ==
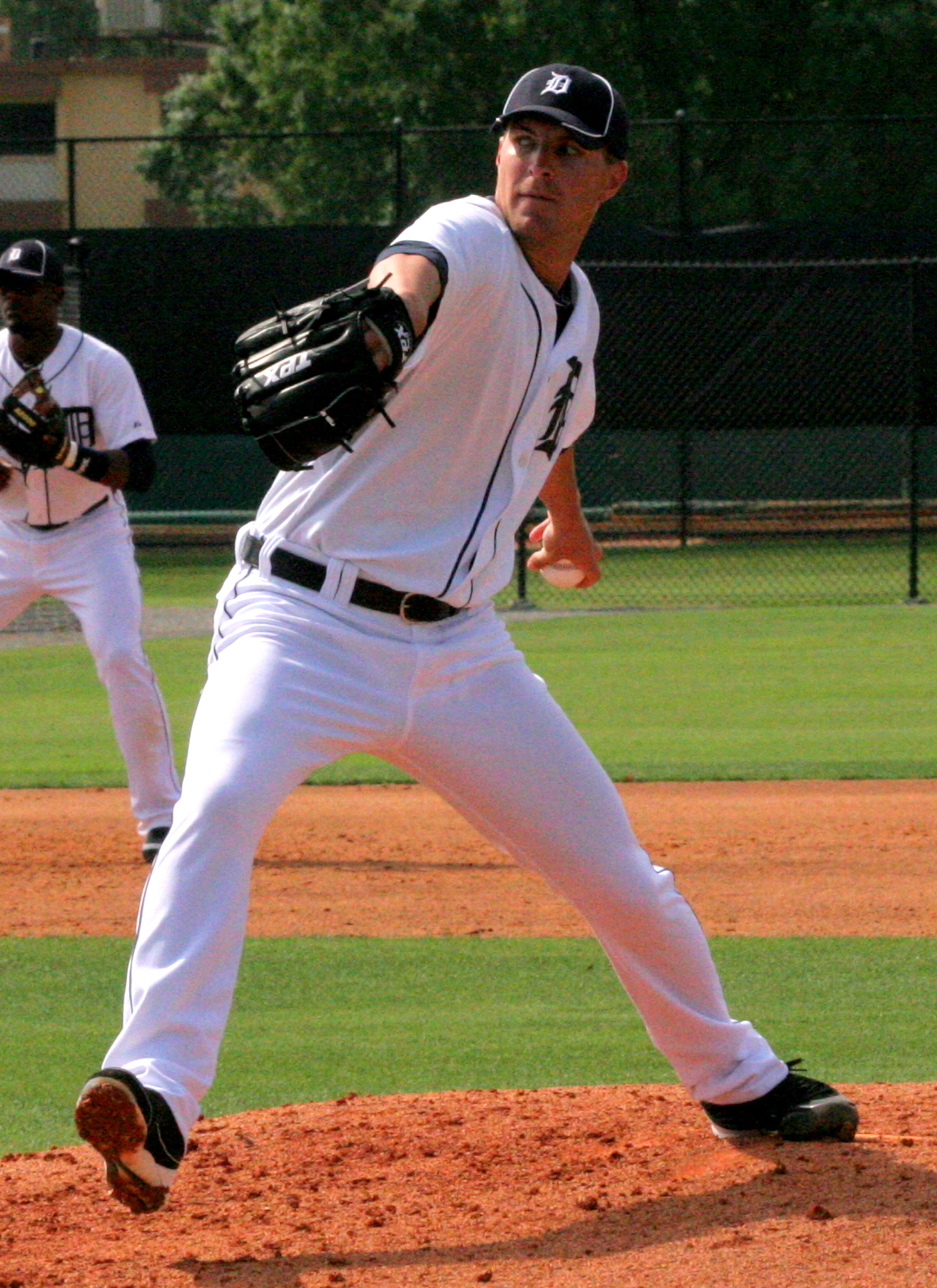
Wilk with the Tigers in 2012

=== Detroit Tigers ===
The Detroit Tigers called Wilk up to the majors for the first time on May 24, 2011, when Phil Coke was placed on the 15-day disabled list with a bone bruise in his right foot.

On May 26, 2011, Wilk made his major league debut against the Boston Red Sox, relieving Max Scherzer in the middle of the third inning. He pitched 3 2/3 innings, gave up one unearned run, struck out four batters, two hits, and one walk. On May 28, Wilk was optioned to the Triple-A Toledo Mud Hens to make room for recently acquired David Purcey.

=== NC Dinos ===
On December 19, 2012, Wilk's contact was sold by the Tigers to the NC Dinos of the KBO League. He made 17 appearances (16 starts) for the Dinos in 2013, logging a 4-8 record and 4.12 ERA with 70 strikeouts across 91 2/3 innings pitched.

=== Pittsburgh Pirates ===
Wilk signed a minor league contract with the Pittsburgh Pirates on December 18, 2013. He made 28 appearances (24 starts) for the Triple-A Indianapolis Indians in 2014, compiling a 7-14 record and 4.73 ERA with 106 strikeouts and one save across 146 2/3 innings pitched.

=== Los Angeles Angels ===
Wilk signed a major league contract with the Los Angeles Angels of Anaheim on December 5, 2014. He made one appearance for Los Angeles on April 15, 2015, allowing one run across two innings pitched against the Texas Rangers. Wilk was designated for assignment by the Angels on July 25. He cleared waivers and was sent outright to the Triple-A Salt Lake Bees the next day.

=== Tampa Bay Rays ===
The Tampa Bay Rays signed Wilk to a minor league contract on January 19, 2016. In 15 starts for the Triple–A Durham Bulls, he logged a 2–8 record and 3.61 ERA with 75 strikeouts across 87 1/3 innings pitched. Wilk elected free agency following the season on November 7.

=== New York Mets ===
On January 12, 2017, Wilk signed a minor league contract with the New York Mets and was invited to spring training. He began the season with the Triple-A Las Vegas 51s. On May 7, the Mets selected Wilk's contract, adding him to their active roster. He started that day against the Miami Marlins, but allowed six runs (five earned) on eight hits over 3 2/3 innings. Wilk was designated for assignment for the Mets the next day, following the promotion of Tommy Milone.

=== Minnesota Twins ===
The Minnesota Twins claimed Wilk on waivers on May 10, 2017. He was designated for assignment by the Twins following the promotion of Adalberto Mejía on May 27. Wilk cleared waivers and was sent outright to the Triple-A Rochester Red Wings two days later. On June 17, the Twins added Wilk back to their active roster. He was designated for assignment the next day, following the promotion of Alan Busenitz. In three appearances for Minnesota, Wilk had struggled to an 0-1 record and 7.84 ERA with six strikeouts across 10 1/3 innings pitched. He was released by the Twins on June 24.

=== Cleveland Indians ===
On January 20, 2018, Wilk signed a minor league contract with the Cleveland Indians. In 27 starts for the Triple–A Columbus Clippers, he registered a 6–9 record and 3.66 ERA with 107 strikeouts across 164 2/3 innings pitched. Wilk elected free agency following the season on November 2.

== Personal life ==
Wilk was noted for his community involvement while with the Toledo Mud Hens. In the 2012–2013 offseason, he began his own non-profit organization, the Adam Wilk Foundation.
