= Ramón Torres (baseball) =

Dominican baseball player (born 1993)

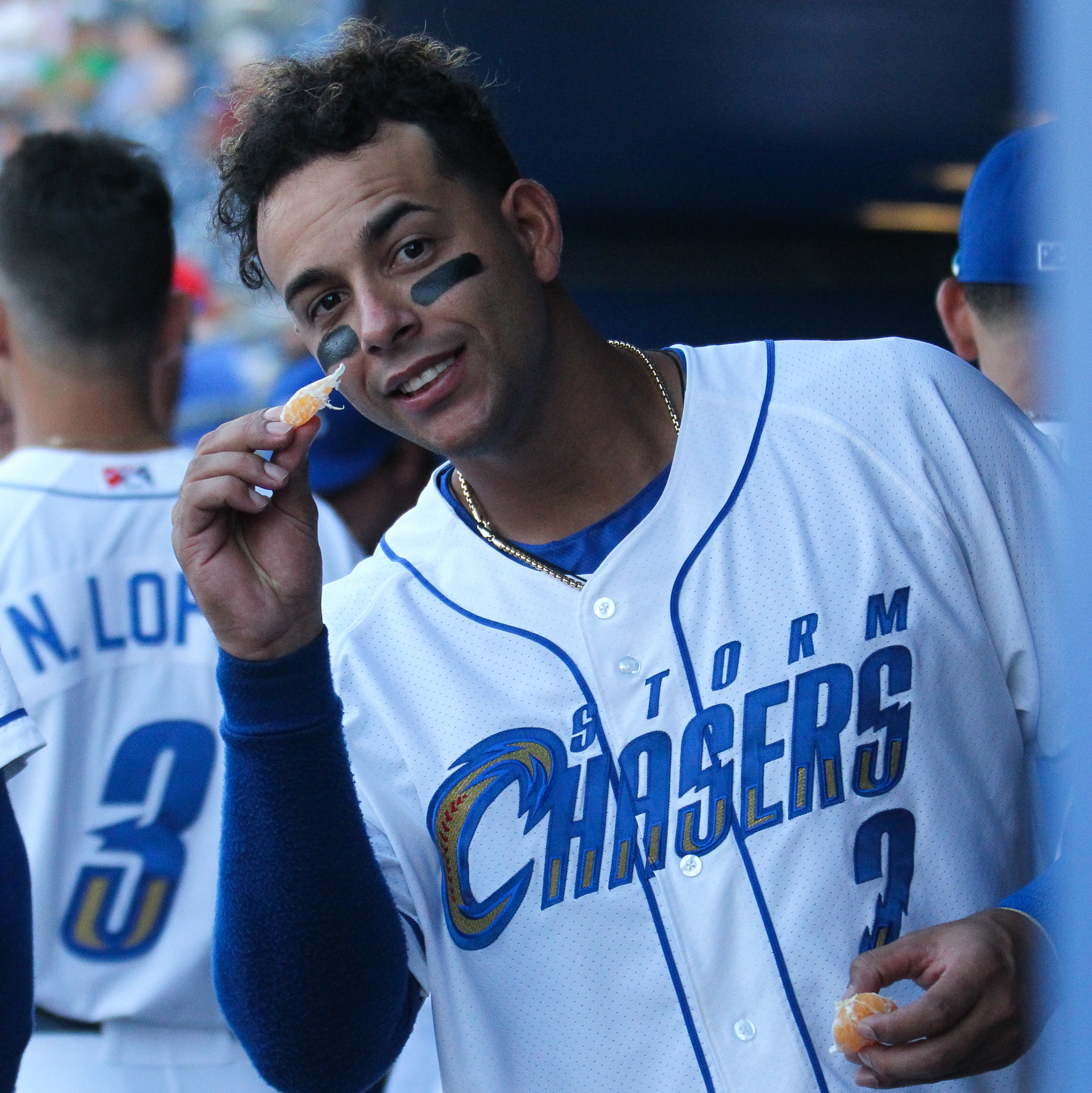
- Torres with the Storm Chasers in 2018
- Infielder
- Born: January 22, 1993 (age 33); Monción, Santiago Rodríguez, Dominican Republic
- Batted: Switch Threw: Right

MLB debut
- June 7, 2017, for the Kansas City Royals

Last MLB appearance
- June 13, 2018, for the Kansas City Royals

MLB statistics
- Batting average: .225
- Home runs: 0
- Runs batted in: 5
- Stats at Baseball Reference

Teams
- Kansas City Royals (2017–2018)

Ramón Alexander Torres (born January 22, 1993) is a Dominican former professional baseball infielder. He has previously played in Major League Baseball (MLB) for the Kansas City Royals.

== Career ==
=== Kansas City Royals ===
Torres signed with the Kansas City Royals as an international free agent on May 28, 2010. He made his professional debut with the Dominican Summer League Royals. He played for the DSL Royals the next year, slashing .260/.351/.397 with 2 home runs and 24 RBI. In 2012, he spent the year with the rookie ball AZL Royals, batting .316/.385/.430 with 3 home runs and 27 RBI. He split the 2013 season between the rookie ball Burlington Royals and the Single-A Lexington Legends, posting a .257/.294/.365 batting line with 3 home runs and 25 RBI. The next year, Torres split the season between Lexington and the High-A Wilmington Blue Rocks, accumulating a .285/.329/.391 batting line with career-highs in home runs (5) and RBI (34). He split the 2015 season between the Double-A Northwest Arkansas Naturals and Wilmington, slashing .264/.308/.354 with 5 home runs and 31 RBI.

The Royals added him to their 40-man roster after the 2015 season. He spent the entire year split between Northwest Arkansas and the Triple-A Omaha Storm Chasers, hitting .262/.311/.328 with 3 home runs and 29 RBI. He was assigned to Omaha to begin the 2017 season, and was called up to the Royals on June 7. He made his major league debut that night starting at second base, and went 2–4 with an RBI double in a win over the Houston Astros. He finished his rookie season batting .243/.291/.284 with 4 RBI in 33 games. In 2018, Torres spent the bulk of the season in Omaha, but appeared in 9 major league games for the Royals, going 5-for-28 with 1 RBI. On November 2, 2018, Torres was outrighted off of the 40-man roster and subsequently elected free agency.

=== Chicago White Sox ===
On February 19, 2019, Torres signed a minor league contract with the Chicago White Sox organization. He split the year between the Double-A Birmingham Barons and the Triple-A Charlotte Knights, posting a .250/.277/.406 batting line with 4 home runs and 25 RBI. Torres elected free agency following the season on November 4.

On February 24, 2020, Torres re–signed with the White Sox on a new minor league contract. He did not play in a game in 2020 due to the cancellation of the minor league season because of the COVID-19 pandemic. Torres was released by the White Sox on June 26.

On May 22, 2021, Torres signed with the Olmecas de Tabasco of the Mexican League. However, he was released by the team on June 1 without appearing in a game.

=== Leones de Yucatán ===
On December 23, 2021, Torres signed with the Leones de Yucatán of the Mexican League for the 2022 season. In 21 games for Yucatán, he hit .317/.368/.443 with two home runs and five RBI. Torres was released on June 1, 2022.

=== Charros de Jalisco ===
On February 19, 2024, Torres signed with the Charros de Jalisco of the Mexican League. However, he was released prior to the start of the season on April 10.
