= Zack Granite =

American baseball player (born 1992)

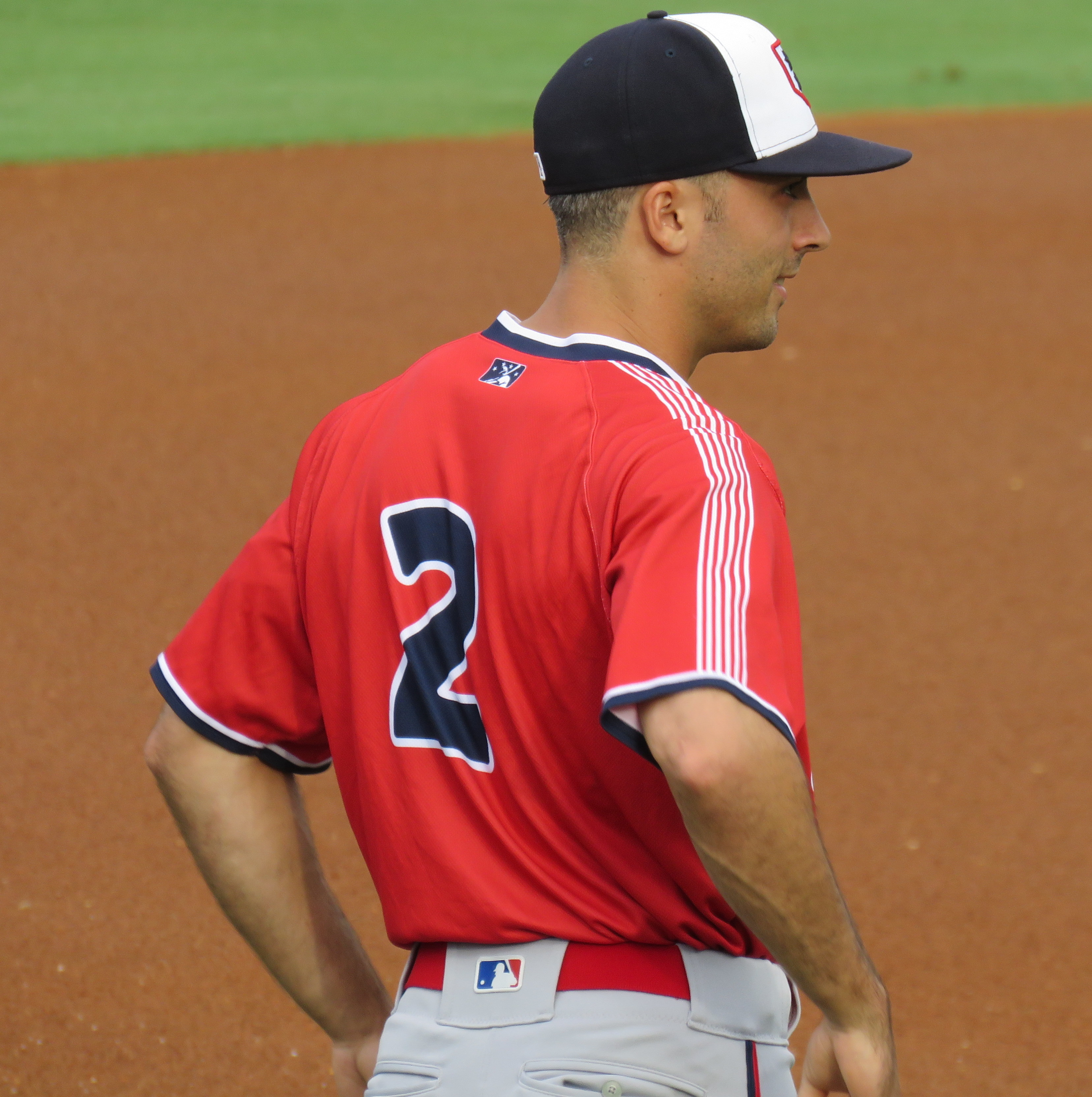
- Granite with the Nashville Sounds
- Outfielder
- Born: September 17, 1992 (age 34); Staten Island, New York, U.S.
- Batted: Left Threw: Left

MLB debut
- July 8, 2017, for the Minnesota Twins

Last MLB appearance
- October 1, 2017, for the Minnesota Twins

MLB statistics
- Batting average: .237
- Home runs: 1
- Runs batted in: 13
- Stats at Baseball Reference

Teams
- Minnesota Twins (2017)

Zachary Thomas Granite (born September 17, 1992) is an American former professional baseball outfielder. He played one season in Major League Baseball (MLB) for the Minnesota Twins in 2017.

== Career ==
Granite attended Tottenville High School in Staten Island, New York. He played for the school's baseball team as an outfielder and pitcher. As a senior, he batted .583 in the postseason and Tottenville won the Public Schools Athletic League championship. He enrolled at Seton Hall University and played college baseball for the Seton Hall Pirates. As a freshman, Granite started in every game, and led the team with a .296 batting average, .387 on-base percentage, 61 hits, 39 runs, 27 walks, and 10 stolen bases. Granite played for the Lakeshore Chinooks in the Northwoods League in 2012.

=== Minnesota Twins ===
The Minnesota Twins selected Granite in the 14th round, 410th overall, of the 2013 Major League Baseball draft. He made his professional debut with the rookie-level Elizabethton Twins, batting .285/.362/.343 in 61 games. The following year, he split the season between the Gulf Coast League Twins and the Single-A Cedar Rapids Kernels, accumulating a .280/.320/.344 batting line in 25 games between the two teams. In 2015, Granite split the year between Cedar Rapids and the High-A Fort Myers Miracle, slashing .266/.349/.328 with one home run and 31 RBI. Granite played for the Chattanooga Lookouts of the Double-A Southern League in 2016, and was named the Twins Minor League Player of the Year after hitting .295/.347/.382 with 4 home runs, 52 RBI, and 56 stolen bases. The Twins added Granite to their 40-man roster after the season. Granite played for the Rochester Red Wings of the Triple-A International League in 2017, and was named to the Triple-A All-Star Game.

On July 7, 2017, the Twins promoted Granite to the major leagues for the first time. Granite made his major league debut the following day against the Baltimore Orioles as a pinch hitter for Ehire Adrianza, flying out in his only at-bat. In 107 plate appearances for the Twins, Granite batted .237/.321/.290 with 1 home run and 13 RBI. Granite batted .140 and injured his shoulder during spring training in 2018. He spent the entire season with Triple-A Rochester, where he batted .211. The Twins designated Granite for assignment on February 25, 2019, when they signed Marwin González.

=== Texas Rangers ===
On March 3, 2019, Granite was traded to the Texas Rangers in exchange for Xavier Moore and cash considerations. Granite was optioned to the Triple-A Nashville Sounds to begin the 2019 season, and hit .290/.331/.375/.706 with 3 home runs and 37 RBI on the year. Granite was outrighted off the Rangers 40-man roster on October 31, 2019. On November 4, he elected free agency.

=== New York Yankees ===
On November 22, 2019, Granite signed a minor league contract with the New York Yankees organization. Granite did not play in a game in 2020 due to the cancellation of the minor league season because of the COVID-19 pandemic. He became a free agent on November 2, 2020.

=== Chicago White Sox ===
On April 2, 2021, Granite signed a minor league contract with the Chicago White Sox organization. Granite played in 51 games for the Double-A Birmingham Barons, slashing .226/.338/.369 with 5 home runs and 24 RBI. On July 12, Granite retired from professional baseball.
