= Trevor Hildenberger =

American baseball player (born 1990)

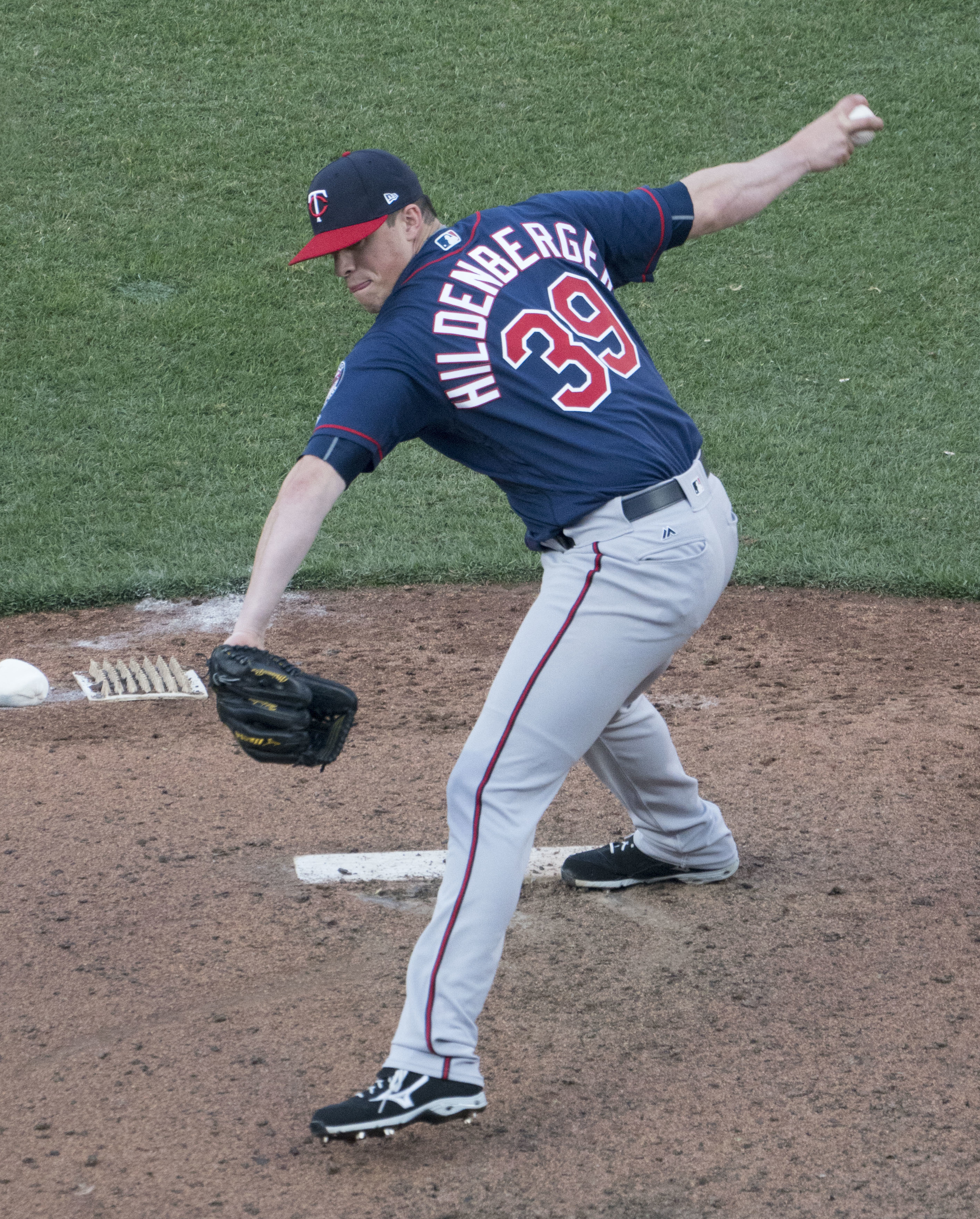
- Hildenberger with the Minnesota Twins
- Pitcher
- Born: December 15, 1990 (age 35); San Jose, California, U.S.
- Batted: Right Threw: Right

MLB debut
- June 23, 2017, for the Minnesota Twins

Last MLB appearance
- April 21, 2021, for the New York Mets

MLB statistics
- Win–loss record: 9–11
- Earned run average: 5.52
- Strikeouts: 133
- Stats at Baseball Reference

Teams
- Minnesota Twins (2017–2019); New York Mets (2021)

Trevor Hildenberger, nicknamed Hildy (born December 15, 1990), is an American former professional baseball pitcher. He was drafted in the 22nd round of the 2014 Major League Baseball draft and made his Major League Baseball debut in 2017 for the Minnesota Twins. He also played for the New York Mets.

== Career ==
Hildenberger attended Archbishop Mitty High School in San Jose, California. He then played college baseball at the University of California, Berkeley. As a senior, his 10 saves tied the school’s single-season record, and he was 3-3 with a 2.83 ERA and 48 strikeouts in 47.2 innings.

=== Minnesota Twins ===
He was drafted by the Minnesota Twins in the 22nd round of the 2014 Major League Baseball draft, and signed. He made his professional debut with the Gulf Coast Twins that same year, before being promoted to the Elizabethton Twins. In 29 relief innings pitched between the two teams he compiled a 1–4 record and 2.48 ERA. He was named a GCL post-season All Star.

He started 2015 with the Cedar Rapids Kernels, and was eventually called up to the Fort Myers Miracle. In 41 appearances out of the bullpen between Cedar Rapids and Fort Myers, he was 3–2 with a 1.55 ERA and an 0.72 WHIP. He also played in the Arizona Fall League after the 2015 season.

Hildenberger spent 2016 with Fort Myers and the Chattanooga Lookouts. He compiled a 3–4 record, a 0.75 ERA, and a 0.79 WHIP in 38 relief appearances.

Hildenberger's 2017 began with the Rochester Red Wings, and on June 23 the Twins purchased his contract from Rochester, with Hildenberger making his MLB debut the same day. In 21 appearances for the Red Wings prior to his call-up he was 2–1 with a 2.05 ERA. In his debut against the Cleveland Indians, Hildenberger allowed a hit and struck out one in his lone inning of work. He spent the remainder of 2017 with the Twins, going 3–3 with a 3.21 ERA with 44 strikeouts in 42 innings.

He began the 2018 season with the Twins, collecting 7 saves in 73 appearances. In 2019, he excelled during the first month of the season before struggling the following month, leading to his demotion to AAA.

On December 2, 2019, Hildenberger was non-tendered by Minnesota and became a free agent.

=== Boston Red Sox ===
On January 11, 2020, Hildenberger signed a minor league deal with the Boston Red Sox that included an invitation to spring training. Hildenberger did not play in a game in 2020 due to the cancellation of the minor league season because of the COVID-19 pandemic. He became a free agent following the season on November 2.

=== New York Mets ===
On December 8, 2020, Hildenberger signed a minor league contract with the New York Mets organization. He was selected to the Mets' roster on April 8, 2021, replacing the injured Dellin Betances. After allowing four earned runs in 2 1/3 innings, Hildenberger was designated for assignment on May 15, 2021.

=== San Francisco Giants ===
On May 18, 2021, Hildenberger was claimed off waivers by the San Francisco Giants and assigned to the Triple-A Sacramento River Cats. On May 21, Hildenberger was designated for assignment by the Giants. He was removed from the 40-man roster and sent outright to Triple-A Sacramento on May 26. He made 20 appearances for Sacramento, posting a 2-1 record and 4.70 ERA with 29 strikeouts in 25.2 innings pitched. Hildenberger became a free agent following the season, but re-signed with the Giants on a minor league contract on December 1.

Hildenberger began the 2022 season on the injured list of the Double-A Richmond Flying Squirrels after suffering an undisclosed injury. After an initial rehab assignment with the Arizona League Giants was halted in August, he began rehabbing again with the Single-A San Jose Giants on September 14, 2022. On September 19, he was activated from the injured list and assigned to Triple-A. In 4 games following his activation, he logged a 2.08 ERA with 2 strikeouts in 4.1 innings pitched.

On February 6, 2023, Hildenberger re-signed with the Giants on another minor league contract. He began the year in Triple-A with Sacramento, making 5 appearances which included one start. He struggled immensely however, surrendering 12 runs (10 earned) on 10 hits with 4 strikeouts and 9 walks in 5.2 innings pitched. On April 20, Hildenberger was released by the organization.
