= Justin Haley (baseball) =

American baseball player (born 1991)

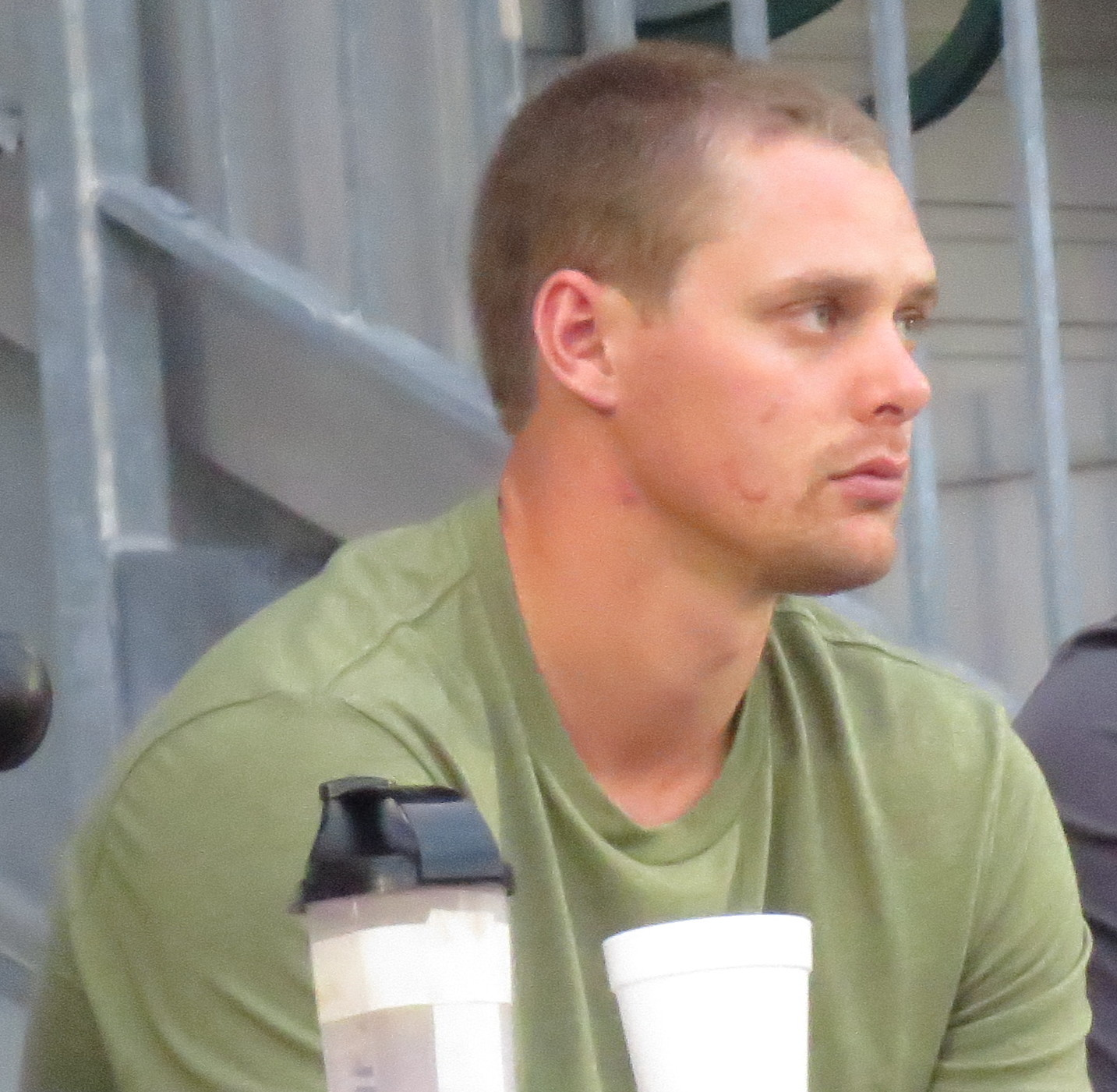
- Haley at Metro Bank Park in 2014
- Pitcher
- Born: June 16, 1991 (age 35); Sacramento, California, U.S.
- Batted: Right Threw: Right

Professional debut
- MLB: April 5, 2017, for the Minnesota Twins
- KBO: March 26, 2019, for the Samsung Lions

Last appearance
- MLB: July 1, 2018, for the Boston Red Sox
- KBO: July 17, 2019, for the Samsung Lions

MLB statistics
- Win–loss record: 0–0
- Earned run average: 5.61
- Strikeouts: 14

KBO statistics
- Win–loss record: 5–8
- Earned run average: 5.75
- Strikeouts: 84
- Stats at Baseball Reference

Teams
- Minnesota Twins (2017); Boston Red Sox (2018); Samsung Lions (2019)

Justin Case Haley (born June 16, 1991) is an American former professional baseball pitcher. He played in Major League Baseball (MLB) for the Minnesota Twins and Boston Red Sox, and in the KBO League for the Samsung Lions. Haley throws and bats right-handed.

== Early years ==
Haley was selected by the Cleveland Indians in the 46th round of the 2010 MLB draft out of Sierra College, where he had been 4-5 with a 4.88 ERA, but did not sign. Haley transferred to California State University, Fresno, where he posted an 8–4 record with a 2.77 ERA and 117 strikeouts in 120 innings for the Fresno State Bulldogs from 2011 to 2012. A three-year letter winner and three-time all-league selection, he also played on the basketball team.

=== Scouting report ===
Haley is described as having a hard fastball, which he throws between 91 and 93 mph and occasionally will touch 95 mph with heavy downward action. He also features a slider and a changeup with late fade.

== Career ==
=== Boston Red Sox ===
The Red Sox selected Haley in the sixth round of the 2012 MLB draft. He came to terms on a contract for a signing bonus of $125,000. Haley debuted professionally with the Class A Short Season Lowell Spinners in 2012, as he finished with a 0–1 record and a 1.89 ERA in 13 appearances (12 starts), including 33 strikeouts and 16 walks in 33 1/3 innings. He made his full-season debut in 2013 with the Class A Greenville Drive, where he struck out 124 batters in 124 2/3 innings en route to a 7–11 record with a 3.68 ERA in 26 appearances, while leading the team in starts (24), strikeouts and innings. His 75 walks were fourth-most in the South Atlantic League.

In 2014, Haley was promoted to the Class A-Advanced Salem Red Sox. He went 7–4 with a 2.82 ERA and 74 strikeouts in 19 games (11 starts), giving up just 23 walks in 92 2/3 innings (2.7 W/9), a significant improvement over his previous season at Greenville (5.3 W/9). Additionally, he had a solid 1.079 WHIP in his 92-plus innings of work. He was named SoxProspects.com pitcher of the week for May 12–18 and earned Carolina League pitcher of the week honors for June 2–8. He also made the Carolina League All-Star team earlier in the season before being promoted to the Double-A Portland Sea Dogs on July 29. There, he went 3–1 with a 1.14 ERA and a 1.20 WHIP in six starts. Overall, he had a 10–6 record with a 2.35 ERA and 107 strikeouts in 130 1/3 innings for Salem and Portland, posting the 3rd best ERA in the Sox minor league system while tying for 5th in wins. He also finished fourth both in strikeouts and WHIP (1.12), and ranked for 8th in innings pitched.

Haley returned to Portland in 2015, and made 27 starts for a total of 124 innings pitched. He pitched well enough to earn eight quality starts, but was limited by a brief groin injury suffered in mid-May. He ended with a 5–16 record and a 5.15 ERA, along with 95 strikeouts and 50 walks. Haley pitched his best outing of the year on August 13, allowing just one hit of shutout ball in seven innings, while striking out six and walking none. It was his longest outing and also matched a team high for the Sea Dogs in 2015.

In 2016, Haley picked up his 13th combined win between the Triple-A International League and the Double-A Eastern League to set a career high. Haley had an 8–6 record with a 3.59 ERA and a 1.13 WHIP in 14 starts for the Pawtucket Red Sox after going 5–4 with a 2.20 ERA and 1.11 WHIP in 12 starts at Portland. Overall, Haley was 13–10 in the season and led all Red Sox minor league pitchers in ERA (3.01) and WHIP (1.12), while ending second in wins and innings (146 2/3) and third in strikeouts (126). In addition, he allowed two or fewer runs in 20 of his 26 starts, and hurled at least six scoreless frames in four of his last seven starts.

=== Los Angeles Angels ===
On December 8, 2016, Haley was selected by the Los Angeles Angels in the 2016 Rule 5 draft.

=== San Diego Padres ===
The Angels traded him to the San Diego Padres for cash,

The Padres traded him with cash or a player to be named later to the Minnesota Twins for Miguel Díaz, giving him his fourth organization of the same day.

=== Minnesota Twins ===
In 2017, Haley made the Twins' Opening Day roster, and had his major league debut on April 5, retiring the side in order in the ninth inning of a win over the Kansas City Royals. On April 13, Haley recorded his first MLB save, pitching 3 1/3 innings of one-run relief in a win over the Detroit Tigers. On April 23, he was placed on the disabled list due to right bicep tendinitis. He returned in early May, but in late May again went on the disabled list, due to right shoulder soreness. During June he was sent on rehabilitation assignments in the lower minor leagues, and in July he was sent on a rehabilitation assignment with the Triple-A Rochester Red Wings.

With the 2017 Minnesota Twins, Haley appeared in 10 games, all in relief, with a 6.00 ERA, 14 strikeouts, six walks, and one save in 18 innings pitched; he did not have a win or a loss.

=== Boston Red Sox (second stint) ===
Haley was returned (under conditions of the Rule 5 draft) to the Red Sox on July 24, 2017. He was assigned to the Triple-A Pawtucket Red Sox, and did not appear in an MLB game for Boston during the 2017 season.

Haley started the 2018 season with Triple-A Pawtucket. He was on Boston's active roster from June 8 until June 19; during that time he made a single appearance, pitching two scoreless innings on June 13 against the Baltimore Orioles. Haley was again added to Boston's active roster on June 26, when Steven Wright was placed on the disabled list. He made three appearances, pitching 5 2/3 innings while allowing four runs, and was sent back to Triple-A on July 2. On November 1, 2018, days after Boston won the World Series, Haley was outrighted from the team's 40-man roster. He elected free agency the following day.

=== Samsung Lions ===
On November 27, 2018, Haley signed with the Samsung Lions of the KBO League. He was waived on July 25, 2019.

=== San Francisco Giants ===
On August 6, 2019, Haley signed a minor league deal with the San Francisco Giants. He opted out of his contract on August 31, 2019.

== Personal life ==
Haley is a firefighter for the town of West Newbury and Newburyport, Massachusetts.
