= Jason Wheeler =

American baseball player (born 1990)

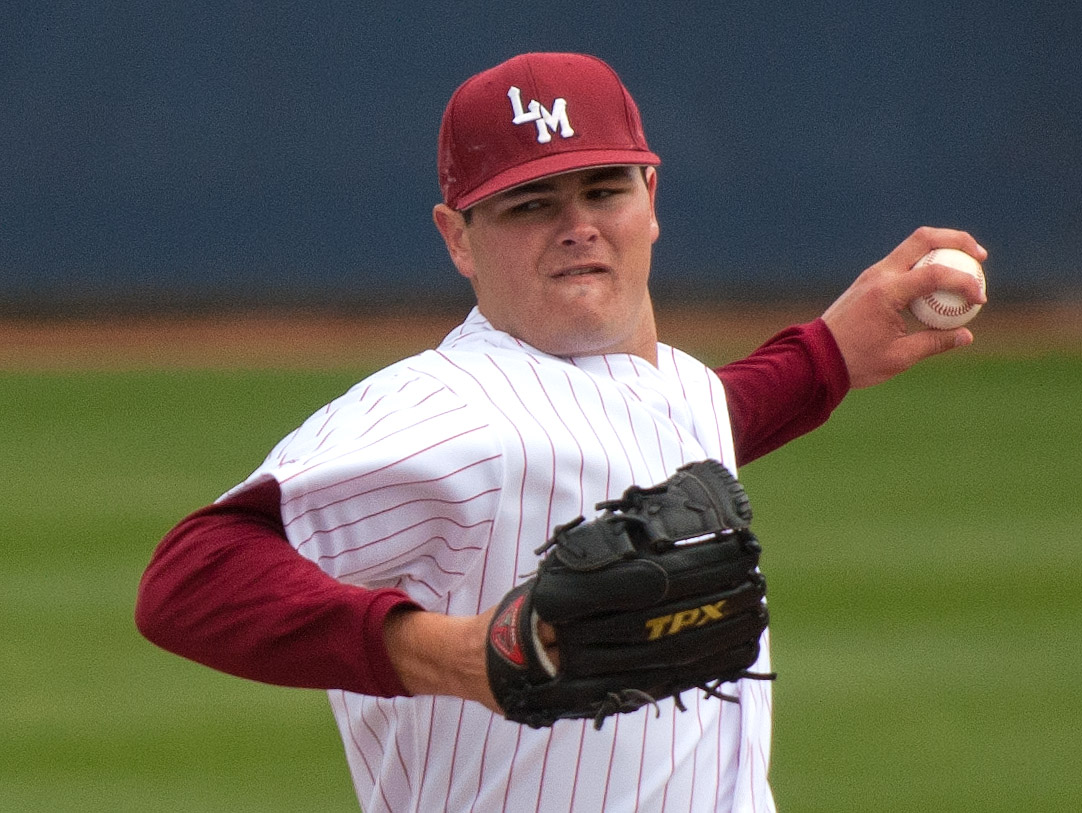
- Wheeler with Loyola Marymount in 2011
- Pitcher
- Born: October 27, 1990 (age 35); Torrance, California, U.S.
- Batted: Left Threw: Left

Professional debut
- MLB: May 30, 2017, for the Minnesota Twins
- KBO: March 25, 2018, for the Hanwha Eagles

Last appearance
- MLB: May 31, 2017, for the Minnesota Twins
- KBO: June 6, 2018, for the Hanwha Eagles

MLB statistics
- Win–loss record: 0–0
- Earned run average: 9.00
- Strikeouts: 0

KBO statistics
- Win–loss record: 1-2
- Earned run average: 7.29
- Strikeouts: 19
- Stats at Baseball Reference

Teams
- Minnesota Twins (2017); Hanwha Eagles (2018)

Jason MacDonald Wheeler (born October 27, 1990) is an American former professional baseball pitcher. He played in Major League Baseball (MLB) for the Minnesota Twins and in the KBO League for the Hanwha Eagles.

== Amateur career ==
Wheeler attended Loyola Marymount University, and in 2011 he played collegiate summer baseball with the Orleans Firebirds of the Cape Cod Baseball League.

== Professional career ==
=== Minnesota Twins ===
Wheeler was drafted by the Minnesota Twins in the eighth round of the 2011 Major League Baseball draft. Wheeler was called up to the majors for the first time on May 29, 2017, and made his major league debut the next day.

=== Los Angeles Dodgers ===
On June 2, 2017, Wheeler was traded to the Los Angeles Dodgers in exchange for cash considerations. He made three appearances for the Triple–A Oklahoma City Dodgers, struggling to an 0–1 record and 10.38 ERA with three strikeouts across 8 2/3 innings pitched; he made one scoreless appearance for the Double–A Tulsa Drillers. Wheeler was designated for assignment by the Dodgers following the acquisition of Peter O'Brien on June 18. He cleared waivers and was sent outright to Oklahoma City on June 23.

=== Baltimore Orioles ===
On July 2, 2017, Wheeler was traded to the Baltimore Orioles in exchange for international signing bonus slots. He made 13 appearances (including six starts) for the Triple–A Norfolk Tides, logging a 1–2 record and 3.07 ERA with 33 strikeouts and one save across 41 innings pitched. Wheeler elected free agency on October 2.

=== Hanwha Eagles ===
On November 15, 2017, Wheeler signed with the Hanwha Eagles of the KBO League. He made 19 starts for the Eagles, accumulating a 3–9 record and 5.13 ERA with 94 strikeouts across 101 2/3 innings pitched. Wheeler was released by Hanwha on July 13, 2018, after the team signed David Hale.

== Personal life ==
His brother, Ryan Wheeler, also played in Major League Baseball.
