= Félix Jorge =

Dominican baseball player (born 1994)

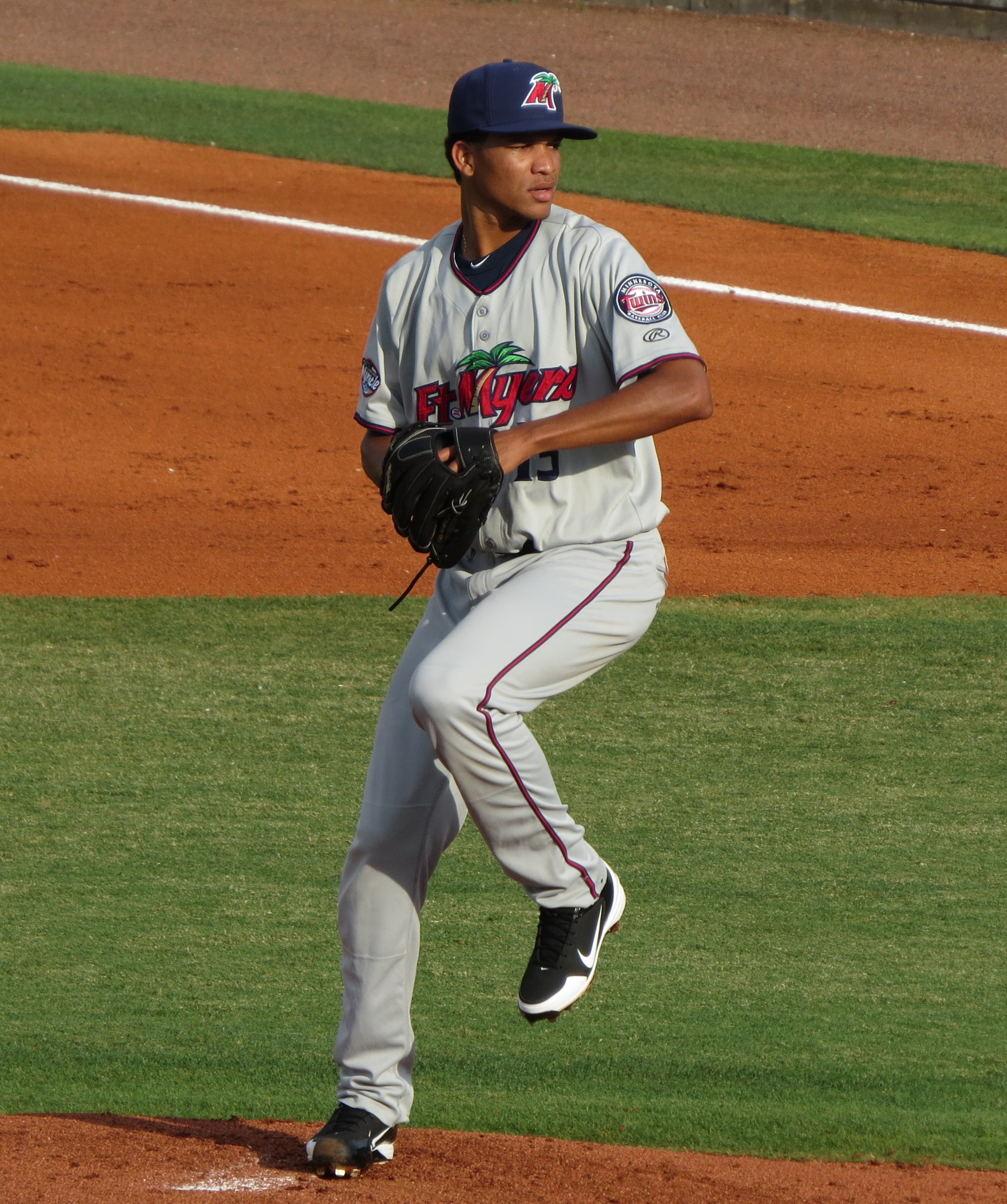
- Jorge with the Fort Myers Miracle
- Pitcher
- Born: January 2, 1994 (age 31); Santiago, Dominican Republic
- Batted: Right Threw: Right

MLB debut
- July 1, 2017, for the Minnesota Twins

Last MLB appearance
- July 7, 2017, for the Minnesota Twins

MLB statistics
- Win–loss record: 1–0
- Earned run average: 10.57
- Strikeouts: 4

Teams
- Minnesota Twins (2017)

Félix De Jesus Jorge Estevez (born January 2, 1994) is a Dominican former professional baseball pitcher. He played in Major League Baseball (MLB) for the Minnesota Twins.

== Career ==
=== Minnesota Twins ===
Jorge signed with the Minnesota Twins as an international free agent in February 2011. He made his professional debut that season with the Dominican Summer League Twins. He pitched 2012 with the Gulf Coast Twins, 2013 with the Elizabethton Twins, 2014 with Elizabethton and Cedar Rapids Kernals and 2015 with Cedar Rapids. Jorge pitched 2016 with the Fort Myers Miracle and Chattanooga Lookouts. The Twins added him to their 40-man roster after the season. He was designated for assignment on June 29, 2018, and was released by the organization on July 4. He re–signed with Minnesota on a minor league deal the next day but became a free agent after the season on November 2.

=== Cincinnati Reds ===
On January 10, 2019, the Cincinnati Reds signed Jorge to a minor league deal with an invite to Spring Training. Jorge was released by the Reds on March 10, 2020.
