= Adalberto Mejía =

Dominican baseball player (born 1993)

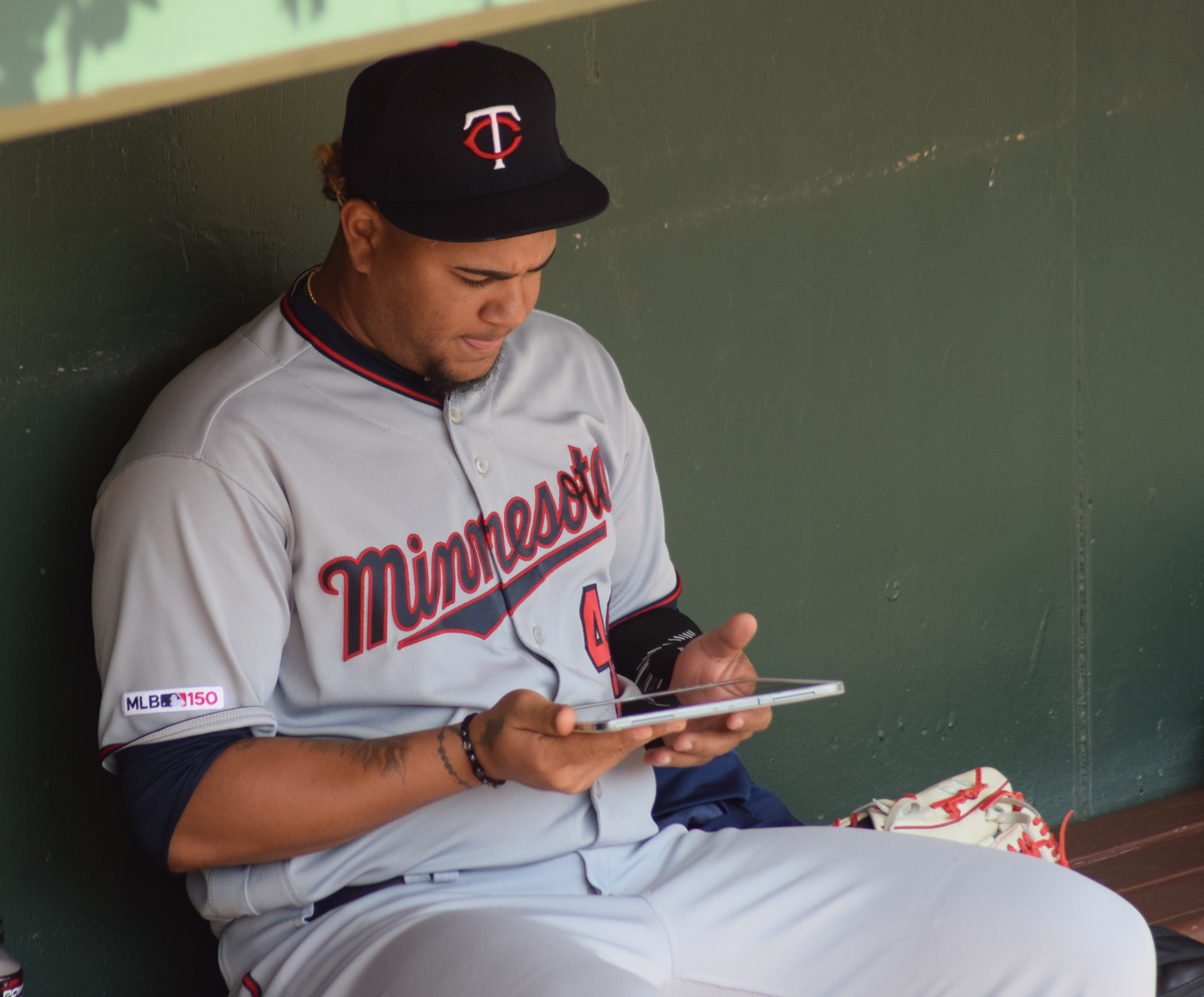
- Mejía with the Twins in 2019
- Pitcher
- Born: June 20, 1993 (age 33); Bonao, Dominican Republic
- Batted: Right Threw: Left

Professional debut
- MLB: August 20, 2016, for the Minnesota Twins
- CPBL: July 20, 2021, for the Fubon Guardians

Last appearance
- MLB: September 28, 2019, for the Los Angeles Angels
- CPBL: August 11, 2021, for the Fubon Guardians

MLB statistics
- Win–loss record: 6–9
- Earned run average: 4.62
- Strikeouts: 128

CPBL statistics
- Win–loss record: 1–1
- Earned run average: 4.84
- Strikeouts: 19
- Stats at Baseball Reference

Teams
- Minnesota Twins (2016–2019); Los Angeles Angels (2019); St. Louis Cardinals (2019); Los Angeles Angels (2019); Fubon Guardians (2021)

Adalberto Mejía (born June 20, 1993) is a Dominican former professional baseball pitcher. He played in Major League Baseball (MLB) for the Minnesota Twins, St. Louis Cardinals, and Los Angeles Angels, and in the Chinese Professional Baseball League (CPBL) for the Fubon Guardians.

== Professional career ==
=== San Francisco Giants ===
Mejía signed as an international free agent with the San Francisco Giants. He pitched for the Augusta GreenJackets of the Single-A South Atlantic League in 2012, and was named the league's Pitcher of the Week for June 18–24. He pitched for the San Jose Giants of the High-A California League in 2013, where he had a 3.31 earned run average (ERA). The Giants assigned Mejía to the Richmond Flying Squirrels of the Double-A Eastern League in 2014, and he had a 4.67 ERA. After the season, Minor League Baseball suspended Mejía for the first fifty games of the 2015 season for testing positive for sibutramine, a banned substance. The Giants added Mejía to their 40-man roster after the 2015 season, in order to protect him from the Rule 5 draft. He began the 2016 season with the Sacramento River Cats of the Triple-A Pacific Coast League.

=== Minnesota Twins ===
On July 28, 2016, Mejía was traded to the Minnesota Twins in exchange for Eduardo Núñez. The Twins subsequently assigned him to the Rochester Red Wings of the Triple-A International League. The Twins promoted Mejía to the major leagues for the first time on August 20.

Mejía spent time in with the Twins and in Triple-A in 2017. For the year he had a 4–7 record with a 4.50 ERA, in 21 starts.

He started 2018 in Rochester, and was called up on June 29. He was placed on the disabled list on August 10, appearing only in 5 games.

Mejía started 2019 in the Twins' bullpen. Mejía was placed on the injured list on May 2. On July 13, 2019, Mejía was designated for assignment by the Twins after posting an ERA of 8.80 in 13 games.

=== Los Angeles Angels ===
On July 20, 2019, Mejía was claimed off waivers by the Los Angeles Angels. On July 26, he was designated for assignment, following continued struggles

=== St. Louis Cardinals ===
On July 30, 2019, Mejía was claimed off waivers by the St. Louis Cardinals. In 2 appearances for St. Louis, he struggled to a 9.00 ERA with 2 strikeouts over 3 innings of work. On August 6, Mejía was designated for assignment.

=== Los Angeles Angels (second stint) ===
On August 8, 2019, Mejía was claimed off waivers by the Los Angeles Angels. On August 20, Mejía was designated for assignment. He cleared waivers and was sent outright to the Triple-A Salt Lake Bees on August 22. On September 1, the Angels selected Mejía's contract, adding him back to their active roster. In 35 total appearances split between the Angels and Twins, he compiled an 0–2 record and 6.61 ERA with 30 strikeouts across 31 1/3 innings pitched. Mejía was designated for assignment following the signing of Jason Castro on January 7, 2020. He was released by the Angels organization on January 10.

=== Chicago White Sox ===
On January 21, 2020, Mejía signed a minor league deal with the Chicago White Sox. Mejía did not play in a game in 2020 due to the cancellation of the minor league season because of the COVID-19 pandemic. On August 24, Mejía was released by the White Sox organization.

=== Fubon Guardians ===
On May 19, 2021, Mejía signed with the Fubon Guardians of the Chinese Professional Baseball League. On July 20, Mejía made his CPBL debut against the Wei Chuan Dragons. In 4 starts for the Guardians, he logged a 1–1 record and 4.84 ERA with 19 strikeouts across 22 1/3 innings pitched. Mejía was released by Fubon on September 29.

=== Staten Island FerryHawks ===
On February 27, 2025, Mejía signed with the Staten Island FerryHawks of the Atlantic League of Professional Baseball. In 11 appearances (10 starts) for Staten Island, he struggled to an 0–5 record and 7.61 ERA with 39 strikeouts across 36 2/3 innings pitched. Mejía was released by the FerryHawks on July 6.
