= 2017 Seattle Mariners season =

2017 Seattle Mariners
- League: American League
- Division: West
- Ballpark: Safeco Field
- City: Seattle, Washington
- Record: 78–84 (.481)
- Divisional place: 3rd
- Owners: Baseball Club of Seattle, LP, represented by CEO John Stanton
- Managers: Scott Servais
- Television: Root Sports Northwest (Dave Sims, Mike Blowers)
- Radio: ESPN-710; Seattle Mariners Radio Network (Rick Rizzs, Aaron Goldsmith)

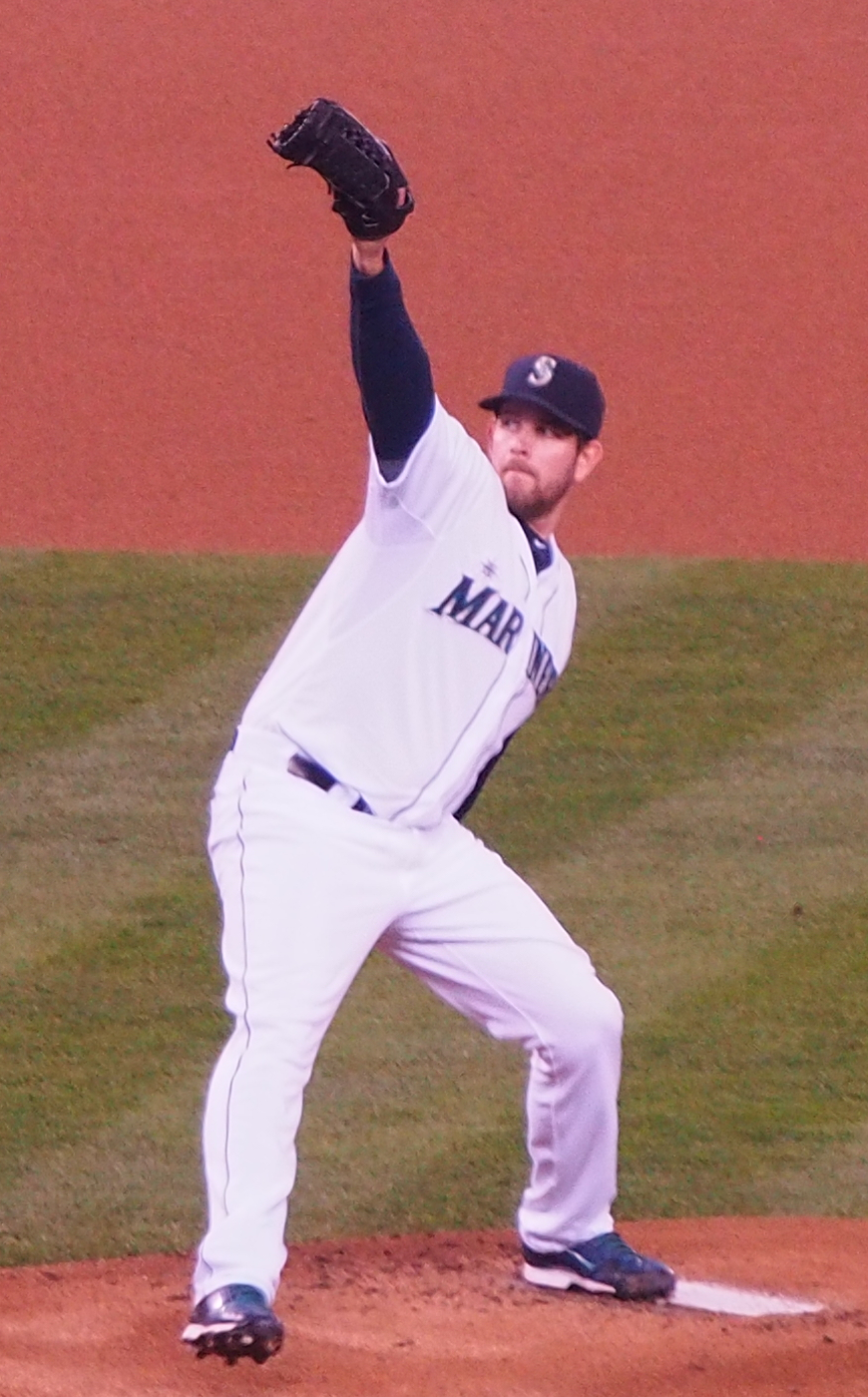
James Paxton, 2014

The 2017 Seattle Mariners season was the 41st season in franchise history. The Mariners played their 18th full season (19th overall) at Safeco Field and finished with a record of 78–84. They failed to qualify for the postseason, extending their drought to 16 years (having last qualified for the postseason in 2001). In addition to being the longest current streak in MLB, the drought became the longest currently in the four major North American professional sports when the National Football League's Buffalo Bills made it to the playoffs in December of that year.

== Offseason and spring training ==
The Mariners added many players in a busy offseason, including pitchers Yovani Gallardo and Drew Smyly, and outfielder Jarrod Dyson. Additionally, the team acquired shortstop Jean Segura and outfielder Mitch Haniger from the Arizona Diamondbacks in exchange for pitcher Taijuan Walker and shortstop Ketel Marte. Other players given up in trades included outfielder Seth Smith and pitcher Nate Karns. The team finished with a 19–14 win–loss record in preseason spring training, the second best record in the Cactus League. Their three ties are not included in the standings.

== Regular season ==
On September 5, 2017, in a game against the Houston Astros, Ryan Garton became the 40th pitcher used by the Mariners in the 2017 season, tying the single-season record held by the 2014 Texas Rangers.

=== Game log ===
2017 Game Log: 78–84 (Home: 40–41; Away: 38–43)
April: 11–15 (Home: 6–3; Away: 5–12)

#	Date	Opponent	Score	Win	Loss	Save	Attendance	Record	Streak
1	April 3	@ Astros	0–3	Keuchel (1–0)	**Hernández** (0–1)	Giles (1)	41,678	0–1	L1
2	April 4	@ Astros	1–2	McCullers Jr. (1–0)	**Iwakuma** (0–1)	Giles (2)	21,406	0–2	L2
3	April 5	@ Astros	3–5 (13)	Peacock (1–0)	**De Jong** (0–1)	—	20,303	0–3	L3
4	April 6	@ Astros	4–2	**Altavilla** (1–0)	Giles (0–1)	**Díaz** (1)	18,362	1–3	W1
5	April 7	@ Angels	1–5	Chavez (1–0)	**Gallardo** (0–1)	—	43,911	1–4	L1
6	April 8	@ Angels	4–5	Ramírez (2–0)	**Scribner** (0–1)	Bedrosian (2)	42,668	1–5	L2
7	April 9	@ Angels	9–10	Bailey (2–0)	**Díaz** (0–1)	—	37,175	1–6	L3
8	April 10	Astros	6–0	**Paxton** (1–0)	Morton (0–1)	—	44,856	2–6	W1
9	April 11	Astros	5–7	Musgrove (1–0)	**Miranda** (0–1)	—	18,527	2–7	L1
10	April 12	Astros	5–10	Peacock (2–0)	**Altavilla** (1–1)	—	14,479	2–8	L2
11	April 14	Rangers	2–1	**Hernández** (1–1)	Leclerc (0–1)	**Díaz** (2)	41,855	3–8	W1
12	April 15	Rangers	5–0	**Paxton** (2–0)	Cashner (0–1)	—	34,927	4–8	W2
13	April 16	Rangers	8–7	**Díaz** (1–1)	Dyson (0–3)	—	19,678	5–8	W3
14	April 17	Marlins	6–1	**Miranda** (1–1)	Koehler (0–1)	—	16,990	6–8	W4
15	April 18	Marlins	0–5	Chen (2–0)	**Gallardo** (0–2)	—	16,126	6–9	L1
16	April 19	Marlins	10–5	**Hernández** (2–1)	Vólquez (0–2)	—	27,147	7–9	W1
17	April 20	@ Athletics	3–9	Dull (1–1)	**Scribner** (0–2)	—	10,707	7–10	L1
18	April 21	@ Athletics	1–3	Manaea (1–1)	**Iwakuma** (0–2)	Casilla (3)	15,255	7–11	L2
19	April 22	@ Athletics	3–4	Cotton (2–2)	**Miranda** (1–2)	Madson (1)	20,722	7–12	L3
20	April 23	@ Athletics	11–1	**Gallardo** (1–2)	Triggs (3–1)	—	24,165	8–12	W1
21	April 25	@ Tigers	9–19	Zimmermann (2–1)	**Hernández** (2–2)	—	22,728	8–13	L1
22	April 26	@ Tigers	8–0	**Paxton** (3–0)	Norris (1–2)	—	23,327	9–13	W1
23	April 27	@ Tigers	2–1	**Zych** (1–0)	Rodríguez (1–2)	**Díaz** (3)	25,325	10–13	W2
24	April 28	@ Indians	3–1	**Miranda** (2–2)	Carrasco (2–2)	**Díaz** (4)	20,842	11–13	W3
25	April 29	@ Indians	3–4	Salazar (2–2)	**Gallardo** (1–3)	Allen (6)	21,221	11–14	L1
26	April 30	@ Indians	4–12	Tomlin (2–3)	**De Jong** (0–2)	—	21,824	11–15	L2

May: 14–14 (Home: 8–6; Away: 6–8)

#	Date	Opponent	Score	Win	Loss	Save	Attendance	Record	Streak
27	May 2	Angels	4–6 (11)	Guerra (2–1)	**Pazos** (0–1)	—	15,080	11–16	L3
28	May 3	Angels	8–7	**Machi** (1–0)	Parker (0–2)	**Díaz** (5)	13,799	12–16	W1
29	May 4	Angels	11–3	**Miranda** (3–2)	Meyer (0–1)	—	15,915	13–16	W2
30	May 5	Rangers	1–3 (13)	Bush (2–0)	**Pagan** (0–1)	Claudio (1)	26,938	13–17	L1
31	May 6	Rangers	8–2	**Pazos** (1–1)	Pérez (1–5)	—	36,044	14–17	W1
32	May 7	Rangers	4–3	**Rzepczynski** (1–0)	Dyson (0–4)	**Díaz** (6)	32,518	15–17	W2
33	May 9	@ Phillies	10–9	**Vincent** (1–0)	Neris (1–2)	**Díaz** (7)	31,715	16–17	W3
34	May 10	@ Phillies	11–6	**Zych** (2–0)	Benoit (0–2)	—	26,697	17–17	W4
35	May 11	@ Blue Jays	2–7	Estrada (2–2)	**De Jong** (0–3)	—	29,120	17–18	L1
36	May 12	@ Blue Jays	0–4	Biagini (1–1)	**Bergman** (0–1)	—	32,865	17–19	L2
37	May 13	@ Blue Jays	2–7	Leone (1–0)	**Vincent** (1–1)	—	42,346	17–20	L3
38	May 14	@ Blue Jays	2–3	Tepera (3–1)	**Díaz** (1–2)	—	42,030	17–21	L4
39	May 15	Athletics	6–5	**Gallardo** (2–3)	Manaea (1–3)	**Zych** (1)	15,431	18–21	W1
40	May 16	Athletics	6–9	Madson (1–3)	**Cishek** (0–1)	—	13,955	18–22	L1
41	May 17	Athletics	4–0	**Bergman** (1–1)	Hahn (1–3)	—	14,117	19–22	W1
42	May 18	White Sox	5–4	**Vincent** (2–1)	Jennings (2–1)	—	17,757	20–22	W2
43	May 19	White Sox	1–2 (10)	Robertson (3–1)	**Zych** (2–1)	—	32,371	20–23	L1
44	May 20	White Sox	1–16	Pelfrey (1–4)	**Gallardo** (2–4)	—	33,801	20–24	L2
45	May 21	White Sox	1–8	Holland (4–3)	**Heston** (0–1)	—	36,782	20–25	L3
46	May 23	@ Nationals	1–10	Ross (2–0)	**Bergman** (1–2)	—	29,650	20–26	L4
47	May 24	@ Nationals	1–5	Roark (4–2)	**Gaviglio** (0–1)	—	29,223	20–27	L5
48	May 25	@ Nationals	4–2	**Miranda** (4–2)	Turner (2–3)	**Díaz** (8)	18,881	21–27	W1
49	May 26	@ Red Sox	0–3	Rodríguez (4–1)	**Gallardo** (2–5)	Kimbrel (13)	35,080	21–28	L1
50	May 27	@ Red Sox	0–6	Johnson (2–0)	**Whalen** (0–1)	—	36,985	21–29	L2
51	May 28	@ Red Sox	5–0	**Bergman** (2–2)	Porcello (3–6)	—	37,174	22–29	W1
52	May 29	@ Rockies	6–5	**Gaviglio** (1–1)	Chatwood (4–7)	**Díaz** (9)	40,298	23–29	W2
53	May 30	@ Rockies	10–4	**Miranda** (5–2)	Anderson (3–5)	—	33,258	24–29	W3
54	May 31	Rockies	5–0	**Paxton** (4–0)	Senzatela (7–2)	—	16,750	25–29	W4

June: 15–12 (Home: 11–8; Away: 4–4)

#	Date	Opponent	Score	Win	Loss	Save	Attendance	Record	Streak
55	June 1	Rockies	3–6	Freeland (6–3)	**Gallardo** (2–6)	Holland (20)	21,536	25–30	L1
56	June 2	Rays	12–4	**Bergman** (3–2)	Odorizzi (3–3)	—	27,933	26–30	W1
57	June 3	Rays	9–2	**Gaviglio** (2–1)	Cobb (4–5)	—	26,995	27–30	W2
58	June 4	Rays	7–1	**Miranda** (6–2)	Ramírez (3–1)	—	28,579	28–30	W3
59	June 6	Twins	12–3	**Paxton** (5–0)	Santiago (4–6)	—	18,166	29–30	W4
60	June 7	Twins	6–5	**Díaz** (2–2)	Kintzler (2–1)	—	15,732	30–30	W5
61	June 8	Twins	1–2	Gibson (3–4)	**Bergman** (3–3)	Kintzler (16)	15,621	30–31	L1
62	June 9	Blue Jays	4–2	**Cloyd** (1–0)	Biagini (1–5)	**Díaz** (10)	33,518	31–31	W1
63	June 10	Blue Jays	2–4	Stroman (7–2)	**Zych** (2–2)	Osuna (15)	45,480	31–32	L1
64	June 11	Blue Jays	0–4	Happ (1–4)	**Paxton** (5–1)	Osuna (16)	41,137	31–33	L2
65	June 12	@ Twins	14–3	**Gallardo** (3–6)	Mejía (1–2)	—	16,996	32–33	W1
66	June 13	@ Twins	7–20	Gibson (4–4)	**Bergman** (3–4)	—	17,922	32–34	L1
67	June 14	@ Twins	6–4	**Gaviglio** (3–1)	Santana (8–4)	**Díaz** (11)	22,283	33–34	W1
68	June 15	@ Twins	2–6	Berríos (6–1)	**Miranda** (6–3)	—	24,464	33–35	L1
69	June 16	@ Rangers	4–10	Ross (1–0)	**Paxton** (5–2)	—	33,960	33–36	L2
70	June 17	@ Rangers	4–10	Pérez (3–6)	**Gallardo** (3–7)	—	35,928	33–37	L3
71	June 18	@ Rangers	7–3	**Bergman** (4–4)	Darvish (6–5)	—	31,552	34–37	W1
72	June 19	Tigers	6–2	**Pazos** (2–1)	A. Wilson (1–4)	—	21,517	35–37	W2
73	June 20	Tigers	5–4 (10)	**Cishek** (1–1)	J. Wilson (3–3)	—	15,063	36–37	W3
74	June 21	Tigers	7–5	**Zych** (3–2)	Greene (1–1)	**Díaz** (12)	18,526	37–37	W4
75	June 22	Tigers	9–6	**Moore** (1–0)	Norris (4–5)	**Cishek** (1)	18,736	38–37	W5
76	June 23	Astros	13–3	**Hernández** (3–2)	Musgrove (4–7)	**Gallardo** (1)	31,783	39–37	W6
77	June 24	Astros	2–5	McCullers (7–1)	**Gaviglio** (3–2)	—	29,820	39–38	L1
78	June 25	Astros	2–8	Feliz (3–1)	**Miranda** (6–4)	—	33,010	39–39	L2
80	June 27	Phillies	2–8	Nola (5–5)	**Paxton** (5–3)	—	22,648	39–40	L3
79	June 28	Phillies	4–5	Pinto (1–0)	**Díaz** (2–3)	Neris (7)	29,505	39–41	L4
81	June 30	@ Angels	10–0	**Miranda** (7–4)	Bridwell (2–1)	—	40,059	40–41	W1

July: 14–12 (Home: 7–10; Away: 7–2)

#	Date	Opponent	Score	Win	Loss	Save	Attendance	Record	Streak
82	July 1	@ Angels	0–4	Nolasco (4–9)	**Gaviglio** (3–3)	—	44,644	40–42	L1
83	July 2	@ Angels	5–3	**Paxton** (6–3)	Chavez (5–9)	**Díaz** (13)	39,279	41–42	W1
84	July 3	Royals	1–3	Kennedy (3–6)	**Moore** (1–1)	Soria (1)	35,789	41–43	L1
85	July 4	Royals	3–7	Duffy (5–4)	**Hernández** (3–3)	—	25,555	41–44	L2
86	July 5	Royals	6–9 (10)	Minor (7–5)	**Pazos** (2–2)	Herrera (19)	15,157	41–45	L3
87	July 6	Athletics	4–7	Blackburn (1–0)	**Gaviglio** (3–4)	—	18,368	41–46	L4
88	July 7	Athletics	7–2	**Paxton** (7–3)	Manaea (7–5)	—	22,213	42–46	W1
89	July 8	Athletics	3–4	Doolittle (1–0)	**Díaz** (2–4)	Casilla (15)	28,694	42–47	L1
90	July 9	Athletics	4–0	**Hernández** (4–3)	Gossett (1–4)	—	32,661	43–47	W1
**88th All-Star Game in Miami, Florida**
91	July 14	@ White Sox	4–2	**Paxton** (8–3)	Shields (2–2)	**Díaz** (14)	20,311	44–47	W2
92	July 15	@ White Sox	4–3	**Hernández** (5–3)	Swarzak (4–3)	**Díaz** (15)	21,743	45–47	W3
93	July 16	@ White Sox	7–6 (10)	**Vincent** (3–1)	Beck (1–1)	**Díaz** (16)	24,502	46–47	W4
94	July 17	@ Astros	9–7 (10)	**Gallardo** (4–7)	Sipp (0–1)	**Díaz** (17)	24,701	47–47	W5
95	July 18	@ Astros	2–6	Peacock (8–1)	**Gaviglio** (3–5)	Gregerson (1)	27,111	47–48	L1
96	July 19	@ Astros	4–1	**Paxton** (9–3)	Morton (7–4)	**Díaz** (18)	35,191	48–48	W1
97	July 20	Yankees	1–4	Severino (6–4)	**Hernández** (5–4)	—	35,175	48–49	L1
98	July 21	Yankees	1–5	Sabathia (9–3)	**Moore** (1–2)	—	34,073	48–50	L2
99	July 22	Yankees	6–5 (10)	**Zych** (4–2)	Warren (2–2)	—	46,197	49–50	W1
100	July 23	Yankees	4–6	Green (1–0)	**Pazos** (2–3)	Chapman (11)	38,503	49–51	L1
101	July 24	Red Sox	4–0	**Paxton** (10–3)	Rodríguez (4–3)	—	29,262	50–51	W1
102	July 25	Red Sox	6–5 (13)	Zych (5–2)	**Fister** (0–5)	—	28,992	51–51	W2
103	July 26	Red Sox	0–4	Sale (13–4)	**Moore** (1–3)	Kimbrel (25)	39,797	51–52	L1
104	July 28	Mets	5–7	Blevins (5–0)	**Phelps** (2–5)	Reed (19)	34,543	51–53	L2
105	July 29	Mets	3–2	**Gallardo** (5–7)	deGrom (12–4)	**Díaz** (19)	33,519	52–53	W1
106	July 30	Mets	9–1	**Paxton** (11–3)	Lugo (5–3)	—	31,162	53–53	W2
107	July 31	@ Rangers	6–4	**Phelps** (3–5)	Claudio (2–1)	**Díaz** (20)	22,294	54–53	W3

August: 12–15 (Home: 2–5; Away: 10–10)

#	Date	Opponent	Score	Win	Loss	Save	Attendance	Record	Streak
108	August 1	@ Rangers	8–7	**Lawrence** (1–3)	Martinez (3–4)	**Díaz** (21)	21,200	55–53	W4
109	August 2	@ Rangers	1–5	Cashner (7–8)	**Miranda** (7–5)	—	23,041	55–54	L1
110	August 3	@ Royals	4–6	Buchter (4–3)	**Pagan** (0–2)	Herrera (24)	29,228	55–55	L2
111	August 4	@ Royals	5–2	**Paxton** (12–3)	Hammel (5–9)	**Díaz** (22)	38,130	56–55	W1
–	August 5	@ Royals	PPD, RAIN; Rescheduled for August 6						
112	August 6	@ Royals	8–7	**Pazos** (3–3)	Duffy (7–7)	**Díaz** (23)		57–55	W2
113	August 6	@ Royals	1–9	Junis (4–2)	**Ramírez** (4–4)	—	29,432	57–56	L1
114	August 8	@ Athletics	7–6 (10)	**Rzepczynski** (2–0)	Smith (2–1)	**Díaz** (24)	12,354	58–56	W1
115	August 9	@ Athletics	6–3	**Pagan** (1–2)	Cotton (5–9)	**Diaz** (25)	14,989	59–56	W2
116	August 10	Angels	3–6	Norris (2–5)	**Diaz** (2–5)	Bedrosian (4)	35,021	59–57	L1
117	August 11	Angels	5–6	Middleton (3–0)	**Pazos** (3–4)	Petit (2)	38,206	59–58	L2
118	August 12	Angels	3–6	Middleton (4–0)	**Zych** (5–3)	Bedrosian (5)	45,388	59–59	L3
119	August 13	Angels	2–4	Bridwell (7–1)	**Miranda** (7–6)	Middleton (2)	43,199	59–60	L4
120	August 14	Orioles	3–11	Gausman (9–8)	**Gallardo** (5–8)	—	17,973	59–61	L5
121	August 15	Orioles	3–1	**Albers** (1–0)	Miley (6–10)	**Díaz** (26)	24,927	60–61	W1
122	August 16	Orioles	7–6	**Zych** (6–3)	Jiménez (5–8)	**Rzepczynski** (1)	33,448	61–61	W2
123	August 18	@ Rays	7–1	**Ramírez** (5–4)	Pruitt (6–4)	—	11,501	62–61	W3
124	August 19	@ Rays	7–6	**Miranda** (8–6)	Odorizzi (6–7)	**Díaz** (27)	12,218	63–61	W4
125	August 20	@ Rays	0–3	Snell (2–6)	**Gallardo** (5–9)	Colomé (36)	13,354	63–62	L1
126	August 21	@ Braves	6–5	**Albers** (2–0)	Foltynewicz (10–9)	**Díaz** (28)	21,284	64–62	W1
127	August 22	@ Braves	0–4	**Sims** (2–3)	Gonzales (0–1)	—	22,947	64–63	L1
128	August 23	@ Braves	9–6	**Phelps** (4–5)	Johnson (6–3)	**Díaz** (29)	23,890	65–63	W1
129	August 25	@ Yankees	2–1 (11)	**Pazos** (4–4)	Chapman (4–3)	**Díaz** (30)	42,057	66–63	W2
130	August 26	@ Yankees	3–6	Gray (8–8)	**Gallardo** (5–10)	Betances (10)	39,810	66–64	L1
131	August 27	@ Yankees	1–10	Tanaka (10–10)	**Albers** (2–1)	—	40,112	66–65	L2
132	August 28	@ Orioles	6–7	Hart (2–0)	**Pagan** (1–3)	Britton (12)	15,106	66–66	L3
133	August 29	@ Orioles	0–4	Bundy (13–8)	**Ramírez** (5–5)	—	13,736	66–67	L4
134	August 30	@ Orioles	7–8	Brach (4–4)	**Bergman** (4–5)	Britton (13)	16,983	66–68	L5

September/October: 12–16 (Home: 6–9; Away: 6–7)

#	Date	Opponent	Score	Win	Loss	Save	Attendance	Record	Streak
135	September 1	Athletics	3–2	**Leake** (8–12)	Manaea (9–9)	**Díaz** (31)	19,030	67–68	W1
136	September 2	Athletics	7–6	**Díaz** (3–5)	Treinen (1–4)	—	22,245	68–68	W2
137	September 3	Athletics	10–2	**Albers** (3–1)	Gossett (3–8)	—	26,898	69–68	W3
138	September 4	Astros	2–6	Keuchel (12–3)	**Rzepczynski** (2–1)	—	20,108	69–69	L1
139	September 5	Astros	1–3	Verlander (11–8)	**Pazos** (4–5)	Giles (29)	14,568	69–70	L2
140	September 6	Astros	3–5	Devenski (8–3)	**Díaz** (3–6)	—	15,104	69–71	L3
141	September 8	Angels	4–3	**Leake** (9–12)	Nolasco (6–13)	**Díaz** (32)	21,396	70–71	W1
142	September 9	Angels	8–1	**Albers** (4–1)	Heaney (1–2)	—	26,248	71–71	W2
143	September 10	Angels	3–5	Bedrosian (6–4)	**Vincent** (3–2)	Petit (3)	20,094	71–72	L1
144	September 11	@ Rangers	3–5	Hamels (10–3)	**Miranda** (8–7)	Claudio (8)	20,686	71–73	L2
145	September 12	@ Rangers	10–3	**Gonzales** (1–1)	González (7–11)	—	20,557	72–73	W1
146	September 13	@ Rangers	8–1	**Leake** (10–12)	Pérez (12–11)	—	23,083	73–73	W2
147	September 14	@ Rangers	10–4	**Albers** (5–1)	Cashner (9–10)	—	21,931	74–73	W3
148	September 15	@ Astros	2–5	Morton (12–7)	**Paxton** (12–4)	Giles (31)	28,328	74–74	L1
149	September 16	@ Astros	6–8	Keuchel (13–4)	**Ramírez** (5–6)	Musgrove (1)	33,650	74–75	L2
150	September 17	@ Astros	1–7	Verlander (13–8)	**Moore** (1–4)	—	30,247	74–76	L3
151	September 19	Rangers	1–3	Barnette (2–1)	**Vincent** (3–3)	Claudio (9)	17,251	74–77	L4
152	September 20	Rangers	6–8	Cashner (10–10)	**Hernández** (5–5)	Claudio (10)	15,962	74–78	L5
153	September 21	Rangers	2–4	Hamels (11–4)	**Paxton** (12–5)	Kela (2)	14,849	74–79	L6
154	September 22	Indians	3–2	**Diaz** (4–6)	Allen (3–7)	—	27,462	75–79	W1
155	September 23	Indians	4–11	Carrasco (17–6)	**Moore** (1–5)	–	31,565	75–80	L1
156	September 24	Indians	2–4	Kluber (18–4)	**Leake** (10–13)	Allen (29)	23,695	75–81	L2
157	September 25	@ Athletics	7–1	**Hernandez** (6–5)	Gossett (4–10)	**Albers** (1)	9,329	76–81	W1
158	September 26	@ Athletics	6–3	**Pagan** (2–3)	Mengden (2–2)	**Diaz** (33)	13,513	77–81	W2
159	September 27	@ Athletics	5–6	Treinen (3–6)	**Simmons** (0–1)	—	13,132	77–82	L1
160	September 29	@ Angels	5–6	Wood (3–4)	**Rzepczynski** (2–2)	Parker (8)	35,106	77–83	L2
161	September 30	@ Angels	6–4	**Lawrence** (2–3)	Bedrosian (6–5)	**Díaz** (34)	38,075	78–83	W1
162	October 1	@ Angels	2–6	Bridwell (10–3)	**Simmons** (0–2)	—	34,940	78–84	L1

Legend: = Win = Loss = Postponement
Bold = Mariners team member

== Standings ==
=== American League West ===
AL West
Team	W	L	Pct.	GB	Home	Road
Houston Astros	101	61	.623	—	48‍–‍33	53‍–‍28
Los Angeles Angels	80	82	.494	21	43‍–‍38	37‍–‍44
Seattle Mariners	78	84	.481	23	40‍–‍41	38‍–‍43
Texas Rangers	78	84	.481	23	41‍–‍40	37‍–‍44
Oakland Athletics	75	87	.463	26	46‍–‍35	29‍–‍52

=== American League Wild Card ===
Division leaders
Team	W	L	Pct.
Cleveland Indians	102	60	.630
Houston Astros	101	61	.623
Boston Red Sox	93	69	.574

Wild Card teams (Top 2 teams qualify for postseason)
Team	W	L	Pct.	GB
New York Yankees	91	71	.562	+6
Minnesota Twins	85	77	.525	—
Kansas City Royals	80	82	.494	5
Los Angeles Angels	80	82	.494	5
Tampa Bay Rays	80	82	.494	5
Seattle Mariners	78	84	.481	7
Texas Rangers	78	84	.481	7
Toronto Blue Jays	76	86	.469	9
Baltimore Orioles	75	87	.463	10
Oakland Athletics	75	87	.463	10
Chicago White Sox	67	95	.414	18
Detroit Tigers	64	98	.395	21

=== Record against opponents ===
2017 American League record Source: MLB Standings Grid – 2017
Team	BAL	BOS	CWS	CLE	DET	HOU	KC	LAA	MIN	NYY	OAK	SEA	TB	TEX	TOR	NL
Baltimore	—	10–9	4–3	1–6	3–4	1–5	3–3	2–4	2–5	7–12	4–3	4–2	8–11	6–1	12–7	8–12
Boston	9–10	—	6–1	4–3	3–4	3–4	2–4	2–4	5–2	8–11	3–4	3–3	11–8	5–1	13–6	16–4
Chicago	3–4	1–6	—	6–13	10–9	4–2	10–9	3–4	7–12	3–4	1–5	3–4	3–3	4–3	3–3	6–14
Cleveland	6–1	3–4	13–6	—	13–6	5–1	12–7	6–0	12–7	5–2	3–4	4–2	4–3	6–1	4–2	6–14
Detroit	4–3	4–3	9–10	6–13	—	3–4	8–11	3–4	8–11	3–3	1–5	1–6	2–5	1–5	3–3	8–12
Houston	5–1	4–3	2–4	1–5	4–3	—	3–4	12–7	5–1	5–2	12–7	14–5	3–4	12–7	4–3	15–5
Kansas City	3–3	4–2	9–10	7–12	11–8	4–3	—	6–1	8–11	2–5	3–3	5–2	4–3	1–6	3–3	9–11
Los Angeles	4–2	4–2	4–3	0–6	4–3	7–12	1–6	—	2–5	4–2	12–7	12–7	3–4	8–11	4–3	11–9
Minnesota	5–2	2–5	12–7	7–12	11–8	1–5	11–8	5–2	—	2–4	3–3	3–4	2–4	4–3	4–3	13–7
New York	12–7	11–8	4–3	2–5	3–3	2–5	5–2	2–4	4–2	—	2–5	5–2	12–7	3–3	9–10	15–5
Oakland	3–4	4–3	5–1	4–3	5–1	7–12	3–3	7–12	3–3	5–2	—	7–12	2–5	10–9	2–5	7–13
Seattle	2–4	3–3	4–3	2–4	6–1	5–14	2–5	7–12	4–3	2–5	12–7	—	5–1	11–8	1–6	12–8
Tampa Bay	11–8	8–11	3–3	3–4	5–2	4–3	3–4	4–3	4–2	7–12	5–2	1–5	—	2–4	9–10	11–9
Texas	1–6	1–5	3–4	1–6	5–1	7–12	6–1	11–8	3–4	3–3	9–10	8–11	4–2	—	3–4	14–6
Toronto	7–12	6–13	3–3	2–4	3–3	3–4	3–3	3–4	3–4	10–9	5–2	6–1	10–9	4–3	—	9–11

== Roster ==
2017 Seattle Mariners
Roster
Pitchers: 63 Andrew Albers; 53 Dan Altavilla; 56 Christian Bergman; 31 Steve Cishek; 67 Tyler Cloyd; 62 Zac Curtis; 35 Chase De Jong; 39 Edwin Díaz; 38 Casey Fien; 49 Yovani Gallardo; 45 Ryan Garton; 44 Sam Gaviglio; 32 Marco Gonzales; 34 Félix Hernández; 32 Chris Heston; 18 Hisashi Iwakuma; 61 Casey Lawrence; 8 Mike Leake; 64 Jean Machi; 41 Evan Marshall; 57 Cody Martin; 37 Ariel Miranda; 48 Andrew Moore; 60 Dillon Overton; 54 Emilio Pagan; 65 James Paxton; 47 James Pazos; 46 David Phelps; 68 Max Povse; 31 Erasmo Ramírez; 25 Marc Rzepczynski; 58 Evan Scribner; 59 Shae Simmons; 40 Thyago Vieira; 50 Nick Vincent; 38 Ryan Weber; 63 Robert Whalen; 55 Tony Zych	Catchers: 7 Tuffy Gosewisch; 28 Mike Marjama; 52 Carlos Ruiz; 3 Mike Zunino; Infielders: 10 Yonder Alonso; 6 Gordon Beckham; 22 Robinson Canó; 6 Danny Espinosa; 6 Mike Freeman; 21 Taylor Motter; 15 Kyle Seager; 2 Jean Segura; 13 Tyler Smith; 26 Danny Valencia; 20 Dan Vogelbach	Outfielders: 23 Nelson Cruz; 1 Jarrod Dyson; 16 Ben Gamel; 17 Mitch Haniger; 13 Jacob Hannemann; 5 Guillermo Heredia; 12 Leonys Martín; 8 Boog Powell	Manager: 9 Scott Servais; Coaches: 14 Manny Acta (third base); 66 Fleming Baez (bullpen catcher); 27 Tim Bogar (bench); 29 Scott Brosius (coach); 43 Casey Candaele (first base); 89 Nasusel Cabrera (interim bullpen); 46 Mike Hampton (bullpen); 11 Edgar Martínez (hitting); 88 Chris Prieto (special projects); 30 Mel Stottlemyre Jr. (pitching)

== Statistics ==
=== Batting ===
(Through October 1, 2017)
Players in bold are on the active MLB roster as of 2022.

Note: G = Games played; AB = At bats; R = Runs; H = Hits; 2B = Doubles; 3B = Triples; HR = Home runs; RBI = Runs batted in; SB = Stolen bases; BB = Walks; K = Strikeouts; AVG = Batting average; OBP = On-base percentage; SLG = Slugging percentage; TB = Total bases

Player	G	AB	R	H	2B	3B	HR	RBI	SB	BB	K	AVG	OBP	SLG	TB
Andrew Albers	1	1	0	1	0	0	0	1	0	0	0	1.000	1.000	1.000	1
Yonder Alonso	42	132	20	35	5	0	6	18	1	18	30	.265	.353	.439	58
**Gordon Beckham**	11	17	2	3	0	0	0	0	1	1	2	.176	.222	.176	3
Christian Bergman	1	1	0	0	0	0	0	0	0	0	0	.000	.000	.000	0
**Robinson Cano**	150	592	79	166	33	0	23	97	1	49	85	.280	.375	.549	268
**Nelson Cruz**	155	556	91	160	28	0	39	119	1	70	140	.288	.375	.549	305
**Edwin Diaz**	6	1	0	0	0	0	0	0	0	0	1	.000	.000	.000	0
Jarrod Dyson	111	346	56	87	13	3	5	30	28	28	55	.251	.324	.350	121
Danny Espinosa	8	16	2	3	2	0	0	2	1	1	7	.188	.235	.313	5
Mike Freeman	16	30	3	2	0	0	1	1	0	4	9	.067	.176	.167	5
**Yovani Gallardo**	1	2	0	1	0	0	0	0	0	0	0	.500	.500	.500	1
**Ben Gamel**	134	509	68	140	27	5	11	59	4	36	122	.275	.322	.413	210
Sam Gaviglio	2	5	1	1	0	0	0	0	0	0	2	.200	.200	.200	1
**Marco Gonzales**	1	1	0	0	0	0	0	0	0	0	1	.000	.000	.000	0
Tuffy Gosewisch	11	28	1	2	0	0	0	0	0	1	14	.071	.103	.071	2
**Mitch Haniger**	96	369	58	104	25	2	16	47	5	31	93	.282	.352	.491	181
Jacob Hannemann	11	20	3	3	0	0	1	1	0	0	4	.150	.150	.300	6
**Guillermo Heredia**	123	386	43	96	16	0	6	24	1	27	64	.249	.315	.337	130
**Casey Lawrence**	1	1	0	0	0	0	0	0	0	0	1	.000	.000	.000	0
Jean Machi	1	1	0	0	0	0	0	0	0	0	1	.000	.000	.000	0
**Mike Marjama**	5	9	1	3	1	0	1	1	0	0	1	.333	.333	.778	7
Leonys Martín	34	115	12	20	2	1	3	8	6	5	29	.174	.221	.287	33
Ariel Miranda	4	6	1	0	0	0	0	0	0	0	3	.000	.000	.000	0
**Taylor Motter**	92	258	29	51	12	0	7	26	12	21	62	.198	.257	.326	84
**Emilio Pagan**	2	2	0	0	0	0	0	0	0	0	1	.000	.000	.000	0
Boog Powell	23	36	6	7	0	0	0	2	0	6	9	.194	.310	.194	7
**Erasmo Ramirez**	1	3	0	2	0	0	0	1	0	0	1	.667	.667	.667	2
Carlos Ruiz	53	125	14	27	8	0	3	11	1	14	38	.216	.313	.352	44
Kyle Seager	154	578	72	144	33	1	27	88	2	58	110	.249	.323	.450	260
**Jean Segura**	125	524	80	157	30	2	11	45	22	34	83	.300	.349	.427	224
Tyler Smith	10	16	2	3	1	0	0	1	0	1	8	.188	.263	.250	4
Danny Valencia	130	450	54	115	19	3	15	66	2	40	122	.256	.314	.411	185
**Dan Vogelbach**	16	28	0	6	1	0	0	2	0	3	9	.214	.290	.250	7
**Mike Zunino**	124	387	52	97	25	0	25	64	1	39	160	.251	.331	.509	197
**Team totals**	**162**	**5551**	**750**	**1436**	**281**	**17**	**200**	**714**	**89**	**487**	**1267**	**.259**	**.325**	**.424**	**2351**

=== Pitching ===
(Through October 1, 2017)
Players in bold are on the active MLB roster as of 2022.

Note: W = Wins; L = Losses; ERA = Earned run average; G = Games pitched; GS = Games started; SV = Saves; IP = Innings pitched; H = Hits allowed; R = Runs allowed; ER = Earned runs allowed; BB = Walks allowed; K = Strikeouts

Player	W	L	ERA	G	GS	SV	IP	H	R	ER	BB	K
Andrew Albers	5	1	3.51	9	6	1	41.0	43	22	16	10	37
Dan Altavilla	1	1	4.24	41	0	0	46.2	43	27	22	20	52
Christian Bergman	4	5	5.00	13	8	0	54.0	61	31	30	15	33
**Steve Cishek**	1	1	3.15	23	0	1	20.0	13	7	7	7	15
Tyler Cloyd	1	0	0.00	1	0	0	1.0	2	0	0	0	1
Zac Curtis	0	0	0.00	3	0	0	4.2	3	3	0	1	2
**Chase De Jong**	0	3	6.35	7	4	0	28.1	31	20	20	13	13
**Edwin Díaz**	4	6	3.27	66	0	34	66.0	44	28	24	32	89
Casey Fien	0	0	15.00	6	0	0	6.0	9	10	10	4	6
Mike Freeman	0	0	9.00	1	0	0	1.0	3	1	1	0	0
Yovani Gallardo	5	10	5.72	28	22	1	130.2	138	84	83	60	94
Ryan Garton	0	0	1.54	13	0	0	11.2	5	2	2	1	7
Sam Gaviglio	3	5	4.62	12	11	0	62.1	63	37	32	21	40
**Marco Gonzales**	1	1	5.40	10	7	0	36.2	53	22	22	11	30
Felix Hernandez	6	5	4.36	16	16	0	86.2	86	46	42	26	78
Chris Heston	0	1	19.80	2	1	0	5.0	14	12	11	5	3
Hisashi Iwakuma	0	2	4.35	6	6	0	31.0	27	16	15	12	16
**Casey Lawrence**	2	0	5.57	23	0	0	42.0	56	27	26	14	45
Mike Leake	3	1	2.53	5	5	0	32.0	32	10	9	2	27
Jean Machi	1	0	1.17	5	0	0	7.2	7	2	1	4	4
Evan Marshall	0	0	9.39	6	0	0	7.2	12	8	8	5	4
Cody Martin	0	0	13.50	1	0	0	2.0	5	4	3	2	0
Ariel Miranda	8	7	5.12	31	29	0	160.0	140	93	91	63	137
Andrew Moore	1	5	5.34	11	9	0	59.0	60	36	35	8	31
Dillon Overton	0	0	6.38	9	1	0	18.1	21	15	13	2	8
**Emilio Pagan**	2	3	3.22	34	0	0	50.1	39	20	18	8	56
**James Paxton**	12	5	2.98	24	24	0	136.0	113	47	45	37	156
James Pazos	4	5	3.86	59	0	0	53.2	51	30	23	24	65
**David Phelps**	2	1	3.12	10	0	0	8.2	9	3	3	5	11
Max Povse	0	0	7.36	3	0	0	3.2	9	5	3	1	2
**Erasmo Ramirez**	1	3	3.92	11	11	0	62.0	57	31	27	15	54
Carlos Ruiz	0	0	9.00	1	0	0	1.0	2	1	1	2	1
Marc Rzepczynski	2	2	4.02	64	0	1	31.1	29	16	14	20	25
Evan Scribner	0	2	11.05	8	0	0	7.1	13	9	9	0	6
Shae Simmons	0	2	7.04	9	0	0	7.2	4	6	6	4	8
Thyago Vieira	0	0	0.00	1	0	0	1.0	0	0	0	0	1
Nick Vincent	3	3	3.20	69	0	0	64.2	62	23	23	13	50
**Ryan Weber**	0	0	2.45	1	1	0	3.2	3	1	1	0	0
Rob Whalen	0	1	6.14	2	1	0	7.1	7	5	5	2	2
Tony Zych	6	3	2.66	45	0	1	40.2	30	12	12	21	35
**Team totals**	**78**	**84**	**4.46**	**162**	**162**	**39**	**1440.1**	**1399**	**772**	**713**	**490**	**1244**

== Farm system ==
Level	Team	League	Manager
AAA	Tacoma Rainiers	Pacific Coast League	Pat Listach
AA	Arkansas Travelers	Texas League	Daren Brown
A-Advanced	Modesto Nuts	California League	Mitch Canham
A	Clinton LumberKings	Midwest League	Pat Shine / David Macias
A-Short Season	Everett AquaSox	Northwest League	José Moreno
Rookie	AZL Mariners	Arizona League	Zac Livingston
Rookie	DSL Mariners 1	Dominican Summer League	
Rookie	DSL Mariners 2	Dominican Summer League	
