= 2017 Cleveland Indians season =

2017 Cleveland Indians
- American League Central champions
- League: American League
- Division: Central
- Ballpark: Progressive Field
- City: Cleveland, Ohio
- Record: 102–60 (.630)
- Divisional place: 1st
- Owners: Larry Dolan
- President of baseball operations: Chris Antonetti
- General managers: Mike Chernoff
- Managers: Terry Francona
- Television: SportsTime Ohio · WKYC (Matt Underwood, Rick Manning)
- Radio: WTAM · WMMS; Cleveland Indians Radio Network (Tom Hamilton, Jim Rosenhaus, Rick Manning)

The 2017 Cleveland Indians season was the 117th season for the franchise. It was the fifth season under the leadership of manager Terry Francona and second under general manager Mike Chernoff. The team entered as the defending American League champion and World Series runner-up. The Indians played all of their home games at Progressive Field in Cleveland, Ohio.

The season saw the Indians win 22 consecutive games from August 24 to September 15, the longest winning streak in American League history and the second longest winning streak in Major League Baseball history, surpassing the marks set by the Oakland Athletics in 2002 and tying the 1880 Chicago White Stockings and 1935 Chicago Cubs. They were four games short of tying the Major League record of 26 straight wins held by the 1916 New York Giants.

The Indians finished the season with a record of 102–60, the most wins the franchise had seen since 1954, the best record in the American League and second best overall. The team won their second straight American League Central title, but were upset by the New York Yankees in five games in the ALDS despite holding a 2–0 series lead. As the Cubs beat them in the previous year's World Series, the Indians were left with the longest active World Series drought, and their drought was extended to 69 years.

== Offseason ==
- January 5, 2017: Signed free agent designated hitter Edwin Encarnación to a three-year, $60 million contract. The deal includes a club option for the 2020 season worth an additional $25 million, or a $5 million buyout.
- March 28: Signed third baseman José Ramírez to a five-year contract extension worth $26 million.

== Regular season ==
=== Opening Day starting lineup ===
No.	Name	Pos.
Batting order
41	Carlos Santana	DH
12	Francisco Lindor	SS
23	Michael Brantley	LF
10	Edwin Encarnación	1B
11	José Ramírez	2B
7	Yan Gomes	C
30	Tyler Naquin	CF
36	Yandy Díaz	3B
35	Abraham Almonte	RF
Starting pitcher
28	Corey Kluber	

=== April ===
The Indians opened the season by sweeping the Texas Rangers in Arlington. This series was highlighted by a 9−6 win on April 5 in which Francisco Lindor hit his first career grand slam during the five-run 9th inning in which the Indians erased a 6–4 deficit. However, the Indians would go on to lose six of their next seven games. The Indians' lone win in that stretch was a 2–1 win in the team's home opener over the Chicago White Sox. The Indians started the season with two of their key contributors from 2016 - Lonnie Chisenhall and Jason Kipnis - on the disabled list. Chisenhall returned to the Indians on April 13.

The Indians finished April 14–10, with the bright spot of the month being a 5-0 road trip against the Chicago White Sox and the Minnesota Twins.

=== May ===
On May 2, starting pitcher Corey Kluber left the game with a lower back strain, and would miss the rest of the month. He had posted a 3−2 record, 5.06 ERA, 41 strikeouts and 13 walks in 37 1/3 innings. Without Kluber in the rotation, the Indians could not establish any consistency, finishing the month 13–14, their only sub-.500 month of the season. The month was highlighted by a sweep of the AL West leading Houston Astros in Houston.

=== June ===
SP Corey Kluber would return to the Indians' rotation on June 1, as he would go six shutout innings en route to an 8–0 win over the Oakland Athletics. After struggling through the early part of June, the Indians would win six in a row from June 15–19, including a 4-game road sweep of the Minnesota Twins, with whom the Indians were battling for the lead in the AL Central. However, the Twins would return the favor a week later, sweeping the Indians in Cleveland. On June 26, the Indians had one of their more impressive wins of the season, coming back from a 9–2 deficit to defeat the Texas Rangers, 15–9.

José Ramírez collected nine consecutive multi-hit games in June, the longest such streak for an Indians player since Roy Hughes in 1936. Ramírez was named AL Player of the Week for the first time in his career on June 18, after batting .516 with 16 hits, three home runs, seven RBI and a stolen base. He raised his average from .265 to .320 over his previous 22 games.

The Indians went 15–12 in June, to improve to 42–36 on the season. Kluber was selected as the AL Pitcher of the Month for June after posting a 4–0 record, 43 IP, 1.26 ERA, 64 SO, 0.67 WHIP and 13.4 K/9 in six starts. It was the third time in his career he had won the award.

=== July ===
On July 2, OF Michael Brantley, SP Corey Kluber, SS Francisco Lindor, RP Andrew Miller, and 3B José Ramírez were all named to the American League team for MLB All-Star Game, played at Marlins Park in Miami. Ramírez started the game at third base, becoming the first Indian to start in the game since Juan González in 2001. As the AL representative in the 2016 World Series, the Indians' coaching staff coached the AL team. Manager Terry Francona had to miss the game, as well as six Indians games due to a heart procedure.

In the fifth inning of the July 7, contest against the Detroit Tigers, Carlos Carrasco pitched an immaculate inning, striking out the side on the minimum nine pitches. He became only the second pitcher in Indians history to do so, following Justin Masterson in 2014, and the 84th in MLB history.

When Jason Kipnis sustained a hamstring injury on July 9, the Indians placed him on the 10-day DL, and shifted Ramírez to cover second base to replace him for much of the remainder of the season.

The Indians started July 6−8, including a tough west-coast trip following the All-Star break that saw the team go 1−5 against the last place Oakland Athletics and San Francisco Giants. After that trip, however, the Indians swept a seven-game home stand as part of a nine-game winning streak. On July 22, Lindor hit his first career walk-off home run in the 10th inning against the Toronto Blue Jays for a 2−1 victory.

The Indians would finish the month 15–10. On July 31, the Indians acquired RP Joe Smith from the Blue Jays.

=== August ===
On August 3, Corey Kluber struck out 11 batters and gave up three hits in a 5−1 complete game win against the New York Yankees, making him the fourth pitcher ever to get eight or more strikeouts in 12 consecutive starts. The preceding three were Nolan Ryan, Pedro Martínez and Randy Johnson.

The Indians finished the month of August with a 19−9 record, including eight straight wins to end the month. Kluber won his second AL Pitcher of the Month Award of the season for August, totaling a 5−1 record and 1.96 ERA.

=== September/October ===
On September 3, José Ramírez tied a major league record with five extra-base hits, which included three doubles and two home runs. Ramírez was named AL Player of the Week on September 5.

Corey Kluber pitched his third shutout of the season with 12 strikeouts on September 12, against the Detroit Tigers, giving the Indians their 20th consecutive win, matching the 2002 Oakland Athletics for the American League record. Kluber scattered five hits while allowing no walks and struck out eight. On September 13, Cleveland broke the AL record for consecutive wins with its 21st straight, surpassing the 2002 A's, and moved into a tie with the 1935 Chicago Cubs for the second-longest winning streak in baseball history. The major league record is 26 consecutive wins, set by the New York Giants, accomplished September 7−30, 1916. The Indians would win a 22nd straight game the next day, but their streak was snapped on September 15, with a 4–3 loss to the Kansas City Royals. During the streak, the Indians had outscored their opponents 142–37, trailing after just eight of a possible 199 full innings.

Kluber won the AL Player of the Week Award for September 17 after becoming the third Indians pitcher with multiple 250-strikeout seasons. Carrasco struck out 14 Minnesota Twins batters on September 28, 2017, in a 5−2 score to give Cleveland their 100th win of the season. It was the third time in franchise history they had reached 100 wins in one season, following the 1954 club (111 wins) and the 1995 club (100).

Kluber, later named the AL Pitcher of the Month for September, produced a 5−0 W−L record, 0.84 ERA, 50 strikeouts and 43 innings pitched. The Indians' record for the month was 25−4, and included the majority of the 22-game win streak, with Kluber pitching Cleveland to three of those victories in September.

The Indians clinched a playoff spot on September 14, the AL Central championship on September 17, and the #1 seed in the American League playoffs on September 30. The team finished the season with a record of 102–60 (.630). The 102 wins marked the team's second highest win total in franchise history, trailing only the 1954 Indians. The Indians led the major leagues in both ERA (3.30) and in pitching strikeouts (1,614). It was the fourth consecutive season they led the American League in strikeouts.

== Season standings ==
=== American League Central ===
AL Central
Team	W	L	Pct.	GB	Home	Road
Cleveland Indians	102	60	.630	—	49‍–‍32	53‍–‍28
Minnesota Twins	85	77	.525	17	41‍–‍40	44‍–‍37
Kansas City Royals	80	82	.494	22	43‍–‍38	37‍–‍44
Chicago White Sox	67	95	.414	35	39‍–‍42	28‍–‍53
Detroit Tigers	64	98	.395	38	34‍–‍47	30‍–‍51

=== American League Wild Card ===
Division leaders
Team	W	L	Pct.
Cleveland Indians	102	60	.630
Houston Astros	101	61	.623
Boston Red Sox	93	69	.574

Wild Card teams (Top 2 teams qualify for postseason)
Team	W	L	Pct.	GB
New York Yankees	91	71	.562	+6
Minnesota Twins	85	77	.525	—
Kansas City Royals	80	82	.494	5
Los Angeles Angels	80	82	.494	5
Tampa Bay Rays	80	82	.494	5
Seattle Mariners	78	84	.481	7
Texas Rangers	78	84	.481	7
Toronto Blue Jays	76	86	.469	9
Baltimore Orioles	75	87	.463	10
Oakland Athletics	75	87	.463	10
Chicago White Sox	67	95	.414	18
Detroit Tigers	64	98	.395	21

=== Record against opponents ===
2017 American League record Source: MLB Standings Grid – 2017
Team	BAL	BOS	CWS	CLE	DET	HOU	KC	LAA	MIN	NYY	OAK	SEA	TB	TEX	TOR	NL
Baltimore	—	10–9	4–3	1–6	3–4	1–5	3–3	2–4	2–5	7–12	4–3	4–2	8–11	6–1	12–7	8–12
Boston	9–10	—	6–1	4–3	3–4	3–4	2–4	2–4	5–2	8–11	3–4	3–3	11–8	5–1	13–6	16–4
Chicago	3–4	1–6	—	6–13	10–9	4–2	10–9	3–4	7–12	3–4	1–5	3–4	3–3	4–3	3–3	6–14
Cleveland	6–1	3–4	13–6	—	13–6	5–1	12–7	6–0	12–7	5–2	3–4	4–2	4–3	6–1	4–2	6–14
Detroit	4–3	4–3	9–10	6–13	—	3–4	8–11	3–4	8–11	3–3	1–5	1–6	2–5	1–5	3–3	8–12
Houston	5–1	4–3	2–4	1–5	4–3	—	3–4	12–7	5–1	5–2	12–7	14–5	3–4	12–7	4–3	15–5
Kansas City	3–3	4–2	9–10	7–12	11–8	4–3	—	6–1	8–11	2–5	3–3	5–2	4–3	1–6	3–3	9–11
Los Angeles	4–2	4–2	4–3	0–6	4–3	7–12	1–6	—	2–5	4–2	12–7	12–7	3–4	8–11	4–3	11–9
Minnesota	5–2	2–5	12–7	7–12	11–8	1–5	11–8	5–2	—	2–4	3–3	3–4	2–4	4–3	4–3	13–7
New York	12–7	11–8	4–3	2–5	3–3	2–5	5–2	2–4	4–2	—	2–5	5–2	12–7	3–3	9–10	15–5
Oakland	3–4	4–3	5–1	4–3	5–1	7–12	3–3	7–12	3–3	5–2	—	7–12	2–5	10–9	2–5	7–13
Seattle	2–4	3–3	4–3	2–4	6–1	5–14	2–5	7–12	4–3	2–5	12–7	—	5–1	11–8	1–6	12–8
Tampa Bay	11–8	8–11	3–3	3–4	5–2	4–3	3–4	4–3	4–2	7–12	5–2	1–5	—	2–4	9–10	11–9
Texas	1–6	1–5	3–4	1–6	5–1	7–12	6–1	11–8	3–4	3–3	9–10	8–11	4–2	—	3–4	14–6
Toronto	7–12	6–13	3–3	2–4	3–3	3–4	3–3	3–4	3–4	10–9	5–2	6–1	10–9	4–3	—	9–11

== Roster ==
2017 Cleveland Indians
Roster
Pitchers: 37 Cody Allen; 51 Shawn Armstrong; 47 Trevor Bauer; 40 Craig Breslow; 59 Carlos Carrasco; 52 Mike Clevinger; 57 Kyle Crockett; 44 Nick Goody; 28 Corey Kluber; 48 Boone Logan; 34 Zach McAllister; 54 Ryan Merritt; 24 Andrew Miller; 49 Tyler Olson; 61 Dan Otero; 31 Danny Salazar; 27 Bryan Shaw; 38 Joe Smith; 43 Josh Tomlin	Catchers: 7 Yan Gomes; 33 Francisco Mejía; 55 Roberto Pérez; Infielders: 36 Yandy Díaz; 10 Edwin Encarnación; 9 Erik González; 22 Jason Kipnis; 12 Francisco Lindor; 1 Michael Martínez; 11 José Ramírez; 41 Carlos Santana; 39 Giovanny Urshela	Outfielders: 53 Greg Allen; 35 Abraham Almonte; 23 Michael Brantley; 32 Jay Bruce; 8 Lonnie Chisenhall; 6 Brandon Guyer; 26 Austin Jackson; 30 Tyler Naquin; 99 Daniel Robertson; 4 Bradley Zimmer	Manager: 17 Terry Francona; Coaches: 15 Sandy Alomar Jr. (first base/catchers); 87 Mike Barnett (replay coordinator); 46 Jason Bere (bullpen); 32,13 Mickey Callaway (pitching); 64 Armando Camacaro (bullpen catcher); 2 Brad Mills (bench/outfield); 82 Ricky Pacione (bullpen catcher); 60 Matt Quatraro (assistant hitting); 16 Mike Sarbaugh (third base/infield); 29 Ty Van Burkleo (hitting)

== Game log ==
2017 Game Log: 102–60 (Home: 49–32; Away: 53–28)
April: 14–10 (Home: 6–6; Away: 8–4)

#	Date	Opponent	Score	Win	Loss	Save	Attendance	Record	Streak
1	April 3	@ Rangers	8–5	**Miller** (1–0)	Dyson (0–1)	**Allen** (1)	48,350	1–0	W1
2	April 4	@ Rangers	4–3	**Carrasco** (1–0)	Pérez (0–1)	**Allen** (2)	23,574	2–0	W2
3	April 5	@ Rangers	9–6	**Armstrong** (1–0)	Dyson (0–2)	**Shaw** (1)	24,649	3–0	W3
4	April 7	@ Diamondbacks	3–7	Miller (1–0)	**Tomlin** (0–1)	—	22,443	3–1	L1
5	April 8	@ Diamondbacks	2–11	Greinke (1–0)	**Bauer** (0–1)	—	28,437	3–2	L2
6	April 9	@ Diamondbacks	2–3	Corbin (1–1)	**Kluber** (0–1)	Rodney (2)	30,191	3–3	L3
7	April 11	White Sox	2–1 (10)	**Shaw** (1–0)	Kahnle (0–1)	—	35,002	4–3	W1
8	April 12	White Sox	1–2	Holland (1–1)	**Salazar** (0–1)	Robertson (1)	15,628	4–4	L1
9	April 13	White Sox	4–10	Swarzak (1–0)	**Tomlin** (0–2)	—	15,060	4–5	L2
10	April 14	Tigers	6–7	Norris (1–0)	**Bauer** (0–2)	Rodríguez (4)	25,423	4–6	L3
11	April 15	Tigers	13–6	**Kluber** (1–1)	Verlander (1–1)	—	26,691	5–6	W1
12	April 16	Tigers	1–4	Boyd (2–1)	**Carrasco** (1–1)	Rodríguez (5)	17,739	5–7	L1
13	April 17	@ Twins	3–1	**Salazar** (1–1)	Gibson (0–2)	**Allen** (3)	16,961	6–7	W1
14	April 18	@ Twins	11–4	**Tomlin** (1–2)	Hughes (2–1)	—	16,553	7–7	W2
––	April 19	@ Twins	Postponed (rain). Makeup date: June 17 (Game 2).						
15	April 20	@ Twins	6–2	**Bauer** (1–2)	Duffey (0–1)	—	17,339	8–7	W3
16	April 21	@ White Sox	3–0	**Kluber** (2–1)	Quintana (0–4)	—	18,159	9–7	W4
17	April 22	@ White Sox	7–0	**Carrasco** (2–1)	Pelfrey (0–1)	—	32,044	10–7	W5
18	April 23	@ White Sox	2–6	Holland (2–2)	**Salazar** (1–2)	—	24,444	10–8	L1
19	April 25	Astros	2–4	Keuchel (4–0)	**Tomlin** (1–3)	—	14,581	10–9	L2
20	April 26	Astros	7–6	**Bauer** (2–2)	McCullers Jr. (2–1)	**Allen** (4)	16,052	11–9	W1
21	April 27	Astros	4–3	**Kluber** (3–1)	Devenski (1–1)	**Allen** (5)	14,452	12–9	W2
22	April 28	Mariners	1–3	Miranda (2–2)	**Carrasco** (2–2)	Díaz (4)	20,842	12–10	L1
23	April 29	Mariners	4–3	**Salazar** (2–2)	Gallardo (1–3)	**Allen** (6)	21,221	13–10	W1
24	April 30	Mariners	12–4	**Tomlin** (2–3)	De Jong (0–2)	—	21,824	14–10	W2

May: 13–14 (Home: 5–8; Away: 8–6)

#	Date	Opponent	Score	Win	Loss	Save	Attendance	Record	Streak
25	May 1	@ Tigers	1–7	Norris (2–2)	**Bauer** (2–3)	—	22,045	14–11	L1
26	May 2	@ Tigers	2–5	Verlander (2–2)	**Kluber** (3–2)	Rodríguez (7)	21,799	14–12	L2
27	May 3	@ Tigers	3–2	**Carrasco** (3–2)	Boyd (2–2)	**Allen** (7)	22,663	15–12	W1
—	May 4	@ Tigers	Postponed (rain). Makeup date: July 1 (Game 1).						
28	May 5	@ Royals	1–3	Hammel (1–3)	**Salazar** (2–3)	Herrera (4)	25,722	15–13	L1
29	May 6	@ Royals	3–1	**Miller** (2–0)	Herrera (1–1)	**Allen** (8)	23,743	16–13	W1
30	May 7	@ Royals	1–0	**Clevinger** (1–0)	Duffy (2–3)	**Allen** (9)	25,754	17–13	W2
31	May 8	@ Blue Jays	2–4	Stroman (3–2)	**Bauer** (2–4)	Osuna (5)	40,014	17–14	L1
32	May 9	@ Blue Jays	6–0	**Carrasco** (4–2)	Bolsinger (0–1)	—	32,688	18–14	W1
33	May 10	@ Blue Jays	7–8	Osuna (2–0)	**Allen** (0–1)	—	35,115	18–15	L1
34	May 12	Twins	0–1	Santana (6–1)	**Tomlin** (2–4)	Kintzler (9)	24,452	18–16	L2
35	May 13	Twins	1–4	Berríos (1–0)	**Clevinger** (1–1)	Kintzler (10)	28,379	18–17	L3
36	May 14	Twins	8–3	**Bauer** (3–4)	Santiago (4–2)	—	23,099	19–17	W1
37	May 15	Rays	8–7	**Logan** (1–0)	Archer (3–2)	**Allen** (10)	14,613	20–17	W2
38	May 16	Rays	4–6	Odorizzi (3–2)	**Salazar** (2–4)	Colomé (10)	18,238	20–18	L1
39	May 17	Rays	4–7	Cobb (3–4)	**Tomlin** (2–5)	—	22,104	20–19	L2
40	May 19	@ Astros	5–3	**Bauer** (4–4)	Morton (5–3)	**Allen** (11)	36,446	21–19	W1
41	May 20	@ Astros	3–0	**Clevinger** (2–1)	Fiers (1–2)	**Allen** (12)	34,698	22–19	W2
42	May 21	@ Astros	8–6	**Salazar** (3–4)	Musgrove (3–4)	—	33,476	23–19	W3
43	May 22	@ Reds	1–5	Feldman (3–4)	**Tomlin** (2–6)	—	26,794	23–20	L1
44	May 23	@ Reds	8–7	**Miller** (3–0)	Storen (1–1)	**Allen** (13)	26,334	24–20	W1
45	May 24	Reds	3–4	Lorenzen (3–0)	**Allen** (0–2)	Iglesias (8)	19,426	24–21	L1
—	May 25	Reds	Postponed (rain). Makeup date: July 24.						
46	May 26	Royals	4–6	Minor (2–1)	**Shaw** (1–1)	Herrera (10)	29,603	24–22	L2
47	May 27	Royals	2–5	Vargas (6–3)	**Salazar** (3–5)	Herrera (11)	30,920	24–23	L3
48	May 28	Royals	10–1	**Tomlin** (3–6)	Duffy (4–4)	—	23,136	25–23	W1
49	May 29	Athletics	5–3	**Carrasco** (5–2)	Mengden (0–1)	**Allen** (14)	20,792	26–23	W2
50	May 30	Athletics	9–4	**Bauer** (5–4)	Gray (2–2)	—	14,184	27–23	W3
51	May 31	Athletics	1–3	Manaea (4–3)	**Clevinger** (2–2)	Casilla (8)	16,784	27–24	L1

June: 15–12 (Home: 7–7; Away: 8–5)

#	Date	Opponent	Score	Win	Loss	Save	Attendance	Record	Streak
52	June 1	Athletics	8–0	**Kluber** (4–2)	Cotton (3–6)	—	19,767	28–24	W1
53	June 2	@ Royals	0–4	Vargas (7–3)	**Tomlin** (3–7)	—	33,408	28–25	L1
54	June 3	@ Royals	5–12	Hammel (2–6)	**Carrasco** (5–3)	—	26,497	28–26	L2
55	June 4	@ Royals	8–0	**Otero** (1–0)	Skoglund (1–1)	—	28,185	29–26	W1
56	June 6	@ Rockies	3–11	Senzatela (8–2)	**Clevinger** (2–3)	—	39,508	29–27	L1
57	June 7	@ Rockies	1–8	Freeland (7–3)	**Bauer** (5–5)	—	36,909	29–28	L2
58	June 9	White Sox	7–3	**Kluber** (5–2)	González (4–7)	—	30,043	30–28	W1
59	June 10	White Sox	3–5	Holmberg (1–0)	**Tomlin** (3–8)	Robertson (10)	31,753	30–29	L1
60	June 11	White Sox	4–2	**Carrasco** (6–3)	Quintana (2–8)	**Allen** (15)	26,611	31–29	W1
61	June 13	Dodgers	5–7	Kershaw (9–2)	**Miller** (3–1)	Jansen (12)	22,171	31–30	L1
62	June 14	Dodgers	4–6	Fields (3–0)	**Miller** (3–2)	Jansen (13)	21,051	31–31	L2
63	June 15	Dodgers	12–5	**Tomlin** (4–8)	Hill (3–3)	—	23,339	32–31	W1
64	June 16	@ Twins	8–1	**Carrasco** (7–3)	Turley (0–1)	—	30,563	33–31	W2
65	June 17	@ Twins	9–3	**McAllister** (1–0)	Wilk (0–2)	—	24,010	34–31	W3
66	June 17	@ Twins	6–2	**Goody** (1–0)	Mejía (1–3)	—	21,371	35–31	W4
67	June 18	@ Twins	5–2	**Bauer** (6–5)	Gibson (4–5)	**Miller** (1)	35,039	36–31	W5
68	June 19	@ Orioles	12–0	**Kluber** (6–2)	Bundy (7–6)	—	13,875	37–31	W6
69	June 20	@ Orioles	5–6	Castro (1–0)	**Shaw** (1–2)	Brach (13)	22,891	37–32	L1
70	June 21	@ Orioles	5–1	**Carrasco** (8–3)	Gausman (3–7)	**Shaw** (2)	26,596	38–32	W1
71	June 22	@ Orioles	6–3	**Clevinger** (3–3)	Miley (3–5)	—	24,954	39–32	W2
72	June 23	Twins	0–5	Mejía (2–3)	**Bauer** (6–6)	—	31,725	39–33	L1
73	June 24	Twins	2–4	Rogers (4–1)	**Allen** (0–3)	Kintzler (20)	33,111	39–34	L2
74	June 25	Twins	0–4	Santana (10–4)	**Tomlin** (4–9)	—	29,672	39–35	L3
75	June 26	Rangers	15–9	**Shaw** (2–2)	Scheppers (0–1)	—	17,672	40–35	W1
76	June 27	Rangers	1–2	Kela (4–1)	**Allen** (0–4)	Bush (10)	19,348	40–36	L1
77	June 28	Rangers	5–3	**Bauer** (7–6)	Darvish (6–6)	—	21,200	41–36	W1
78	June 29	Rangers	5–1	**Kluber** (7–2)	Cashner (3–7)	—	23,996	42–36	W2
—	June 30	@ Tigers	Postponed (rain). Makeup date: September 1 (Game 1).						

July: 15–11 (Home: 10–3; Away: 5–8)

#	Date	Opponent	Score	Win	Loss	Save	Attendance	Record	Streak
79	July 1	@ Tigers	4–7	Greene (2–2)	**Shaw** (2–3)	Wilson (8)	28,719	42–37	L1
80	July 1	@ Tigers	4–1	**Carrasco** (9–3)	Zimmermann (5–6)	**Miller** (2)	27,016	43–37	W1
81	July 2	@ Tigers	11–8	**Clevinger** (4–3)	Verlander (5–5)	**Allen** (16)	30,429	44–37	W2
82	July 4	Padres	0–1	Torres (5–2)	**Kluber** (7–3)	Maurer (17)	33,869	44–38	L1
83	July 5	Padres	2–6	Perdomo (4–4)	**Bauer** (7–7)	—	18,765	44–39	L2
84	July 6	Padres	11–2	**Tomlin** (5–9)	Lamet (3–3)	—	19,057	45–39	W1
85	July 7	Tigers	11–2	**Carrasco** (10–3)	Zimmermann (5–7)	—	32,307	46–39	W2
86	July 8	Tigers	4–0	**Clevinger** (5–3)	Verlander (5–6)	—	34,726	47–39	W3
87	July 9	Tigers	3–5	Fulmer (9–6)	**Goody** (1–1)	Wilson (10)	24,915	47–40	L1
**88th All-Star Game**
88	July 14	@ Athletics	0–5	Gray (5–4)	**Carrasco** (10–4)	—	19,870	47–41	L2
89	July 15	@ Athletics	3–5	Madson (2–4)	**Miller** (3–3)	—	33,021	47–42	L3
90	July 16	@ Athletics	3–7	Manaea (8–5)	**Bauer** (7–8)	—	25,509	47–43	L4
91	July 17	@ Giants	5–3	**Tomlin** (6–9)	Moore (3–10)	**Allen** (17)	39,538	48–43	W1
92	July 18	@ Giants	1–2 (10)	Dyson (2–7)	**Allen** (0–5)	—	39,151	48–44	L1
93	July 19	@ Giants	4–5	Gearrin (4–3)	**Shaw** (2–4)	Dyson (5)	41,067	48–45	L2
94	July 21	Blue Jays	13–3	**Bauer** (8–8)	Estrada (4–7)	—	34,284	49–45	W1
95	July 22	Blue Jays	2–1 (10)	**Shaw** (3–4)	Barnes (2–3)	—	34,569	50–45	W2
96	July 23	Blue Jays	8–1	**Kluber** (8–3)	Happ (3–7)	—	30,701	51–45	W3
97	July 24	Reds	6–2	**Tomlin** (7–9)	Adleman (5–8)	—	21,500	52–45	W4
98	July 25	Angels	11–7 (11)	**Otero** (2–0)	Norris (1–3)	—	22,364	53–45	W5
99	July 26	Angels	10–4	**Shaw** (4–4)	Nolasco (4–12)	—	22,658	54–45	W6
100	July 27	Angels	2–1	**Bauer** (9–8)	Ramírez (9–9)	**Allen** (18)	28,083	55–45	W7
101	July 28	@ White Sox	9–3	**Salazar** (4–5)	Holland (5–10)	—	20,387	56–45	W8
102	July 29	@ White Sox	5–4	**Miller** (4–3)	Bummer (0–1)	**Allen** (19)	30,115	57–45	W9
103	July 30	@ White Sox	1–3	Clippard (2–6)	**Shaw** (4–5)	—	28,152	57–46	L1
104	July 31	@ Red Sox	2–6	Fister (1–5)	**Clevinger** (5–4)	—	37,169	57–47	L2

August: 19–9 (Home: 8–5; Away: 11–4)

#	Date	Opponent	Score	Win	Loss	Save	Attendance	Record	Streak
105	August 1	@ Red Sox	10–12	Kimbrel (3–0)	**Allen** (0–6)	—	37,126	57–48	L3
—	August 2	@ Red Sox	Postponed (rain). Makeup date: August 14.						
106	August 3	Yankees	5–1	**Kluber** (9–3)	Gray (6–6)	—	28,124	58–48	W1
107	August 4	Yankees	7–2	**Bauer** (10–8)	García (5–8)	—	34,466	59–48	W2
108	August 5	Yankees	1–2	Robertson (5–2)	**McAllister** (1–1)	Chapman (14)	34,651	59–49	L1
109	August 6	Yankees	1–8	Severino (9–4)	**Carrasco** (10–5)	—	33,044	59–50	L2
110	August 8	Rockies	4–1	**Kluber** (10–3)	Holland (2–3)	—	26,088	60–50	W1
111	August 9	Rockies	2–3 (12)	Estévez (5–0)	**McAllister** (1–2)	Chatwood (1)	25,539	60–51	L1
112	August 10	@ Rays	1–4	Hunter (2–2)	**Goody** (1–2)	Colomé (34)	9,533	60–52	L2
113	August 11	@ Rays	5–0	**Carrasco** (11–5)	Faria (5–3)	—	16,794	61–52	W1
114	August 12	@ Rays	3–0	**Clevinger** (6–4)	Archer (8–7)	**Allen** (20)	22,024	62–52	W2
115	August 13	@ Rays	4–3	**Kluber** (11–3)	Hunter (2–3)	**Allen** (21)	17,775	63–52	W3
116	August 14	@ Red Sox	7–3	**Bauer** (11–8)	Fister (2–6)	—	37,430	64–52	W4
117	August 15	@ Twins	8–1	**Salazar** (5–5)	Colón (2–2)	—	29,626	65–52	W5
—	August 16	@ Twins	Postponed (rain). Makeup date: August 17 (Game 2).						
118	August 17	@ Twins	9–3	**Carrasco** (12–5)	Gibson (6–10)	—	29,579	66–52	W6
119	August 17	@ Twins	2–4	Hildenberger (2–1)	**Clevinger** (6–5)	Belisle (3)	22,857	66–53	L1
120	August 18	@ Royals	10–1	**Kluber** (12–3)	Kennedy (4–9)	—	35,974	67–53	W1
121	August 19	@ Royals	5–0	**Bauer** (12–8)	Vargas (14–7)	—	34,204	68–53	W2
122	August 20	@ Royals	4–7	Hammel (6–9)	**Salazar** (5–6)	—	27,427	68–54	L1
123	August 21	Red Sox	5–4	**Allen** (1–6)	Workman (0–1)	—	21,428	69–54	W1
124	August 22	Red Sox	1–9	Fister (3–6)	**Carrasco** (12–6)	—	19,563	69–55	L1
125	August 23	Red Sox	1–6	Pomeranz (13–4)	**Kluber** (12–4)	—	25,346	69–56	L2
126	August 24	Red Sox	13–6	**Bauer** (13–8)	Sale (14–6)	—	21,643	70–56	W1
127	August 25	Royals	4–0	**Merritt** (1–0)	Vargas (14–8)	—	34,061	71–56	W2
128	August 26	Royals	4–0	**Clevinger** (7–5)	Hammel (6–10)	—	34,273	72–56	W3
129	August 27	Royals	12–0	**Carrasco** (13–6)	Skoglund (1–2)	—	32,229	73–56	W4
130	August 28	@ Yankees	6–2	**Kluber** (13–4)	Severino (11–6)	—	36,253	74–56	W5
—	August 29	@ Yankees	Postponed (rain). Makeup date: August 30 (Game 2).						
131	August 30	@ Yankees	2–1	**Bauer** (14–8)	Garcia (5–9)	**Allen** (22)		75–56	W6
132	August 30	@ Yankees	9–4	**Merritt** (2–0)	Montgomery (7–7)	—	39,598	76–56	W7

September/October: 26–4 (Home: 13–3; Away: 13–1)

#	Date	Opponent	Score	Win	Loss	Save	Attendance	Record	Streak
133	September 1	@ Tigers	3–2	**Allen** (2–6)	Greene (3–3)	**Smith** (1)	26,093	77–56	W8
134	September 1	@ Tigers	10–0	**Clevinger** (8–5)	Farmer (3–2)	—	24,342	78–56	W9
135	September 2	@ Tigers	5–2	**Kluber** (14–4)	Zimmermann (8–12)	**Allen** (23)	25,272	79–56	W10
136	September 3	@ Tigers	11–1	**Tomlin** (8–9)	Bell (0–2)	—	25,244	80–56	W11
137	September 4	@ White Sox	5–3	**Bauer** (15–8)	Shields (2–6)	**Allen** (24)	16,848	81–56	W12
138	September 5	@ White Sox	9–4	**Otero** (3–0)	Holmberg (2–4)	—	12,369	82–56	W13
139	September 6	@ White Sox	5–1	**Carrasco** (14–6)	López (0–3)	—	13,403	83–56	W14
140	September 7	@ White Sox	11–2	**Kluber** (15–4)	Pelfrey (3–11)	—	17,019	84–56	W15
141	September 8	Orioles	5–0	**Clevinger** (9–5)	Miley (8–12)	—	30,090	85–56	W16
142	September 9	Orioles	4–2	**Tomlin** (9–9)	Ynoa (1–1)	**Allen** (25)	30,459	86–56	W17
143	September 10	Orioles	3–2	**Bauer** (16–8)	Hellickson (8–9)	**Allen** (26)	21,259	87–56	W18
144	September 11	Tigers	11–0	**Carrasco** (15–6)	Jaye (1–1)	—	18,521	88–56	W19
145	September 12	Tigers	2–0	**Kluber** (16–4)	Boyd (5–10)	—	24,654	89–56	W20
146	September 13	Tigers	5–3	**Clevinger** (10–5)	Farmer (4–3)	**Allen** (27)	29,346	90–56	W21
147	September 14	Royals	3–2 (10)	**Allen** (3–6)	Maurer (3–6)	—	30,874	91–56	W22
148	September 15	Royals	3–4	Vargas (16–10)	**Bauer** (16–9)	Minor (1)	34,025	91–57	L1
149	September 16	Royals	8–4	**Carrasco** (16–6)	Hammel (8–12)	—	33,688	92–57	W1
150	September 17	Royals	3–2	**Kluber** (17–4)	Duffy (8–9)	**Allen** (28)	32,313	93–57	W2
151	September 19	@ Angels	6–3	**Clevinger** (11–5)	Skaggs (2–6)	–	36,171	94–57	W3
152	September 20	@ Angels	6–5	**Olson** (1–0)	Petit (5–1)	**Shaw** (3)	38,424	95–57	W4
153	September 21	@ Angels	4–1	**McAllister** (2–2)	Bridwell (8–3)	**Olson** (1)	29,863	96–57	W5
154	September 22	@ Mariners	1–3	Diaz (4–6)	**Allen** (3–7)	—	27,462	96–58	L1
155	September 23	@ Mariners	11–4	**Carrasco** (17–6)	Moore (1–5)	–	31,565	97–58	W1
156	September 24	@ Mariners	4–2	**Kluber** (18–4)	Leake (10–13)	**Allen** (29)	23,695	98–58	W2
157	September 26	Twins	6–8	Rogers (7–3)	**Shaw** (4–6)	Belisle (8)	21,268	98–59	L1
158	September 27	Twins	4–2	**Clevinger** (12–5)	Mejia (4–7)	—	19,682	99–59	W1
159	September 28	Twins	5–2	**Carrasco** (18–6)	Hildenberger (3–3)	—	21,810	100–59	W2
160	September 29	White Sox	10–1	**Bauer** (17–9)	Pelfrey (3–12)	—	26,983	101–59	W3
161	September 30	White Sox	1–2	Fulmer (3–1)	**Clevinger** (12–6)	Minaya (9)	33,173	101–60	L1
162	October 1	White Sox	3–1	**Tomlin** (10–9)	Volstad (1–2)	**Allen** (30)	30,036	102–60	W1

Legend: = Win = Loss = Postponement
Bold = Indians team member

== Postseason ==
=== Game log ===
2017 Postseason: 2−3 (Home 2−1; Away 0−2)
American League Division Series: 2−3 (Home 2–1; Away 0–2)

#	Date	Opponent	Score	Win	Loss	Save	Attendance	Record
1	October 5	Yankees	4–0	**Bauer** (1–0)	Gray (0–1)	**Allen** (1)	37,612	1–0
2	October 6	Yankees	9–8 (13)	**Tomlin** (1–0)	Betances (0–1)		37,681	2–0
3	October 8	@ Yankees	0–1	Tanaka (1–0)	**Miller** (0–1)	Chapman (1)	48,614	2–1
4	October 9	@ Yankees	3–7	Severino (1–0)	**Bauer** (1–1)	Kahnle (1)	47,316	2–2
5	October 11	Yankees	2–5	Robertson (1–0)	**Kluber** (0–1)	Chapman (2)	37,802	2–3

Legend: = Win = Loss
Bold = Indians team member

=== Postseason rosters ===
Playoff rosters
American League Division Series

- Pitchers: 24 Andrew Miller 27 Bryan Shaw 28 Corey Kluber 31 Danny Salazar 37 Cody Allen 38 Joe Smith 43 Josh Tomlin 47 Trevor Bauer 49 Tyler Olson 52 Mike Clevinger 59 Carlos Carrasco
- Catchers: 7 Yan Gomes 55 Roberto Pérez
- Infielders: 9 Erik González 11 José Ramírez 12 Francisco Lindor 22 Jason Kipnis 39 Giovanny Urshela 41 Carlos Santana
- Outfielders: 8 Lonnie Chisenhall 23 Michael Brantley 26 Austin Jackson 32 Jay Bruce 53 Greg Allen
- Designated hitters: 10 Edwin Encarnación

== Player stats ==
Note: Team leaders in each category are noted in bold.

Note: * = Denotes league leader.

=== Batting ===
Note; G = Games played; AB = At bats; R = Runs scored; H = Hits; 2B = Doubles; 3B = Triples; HR = Home runs; RBI = Runs batted in; BB = Walks; AVG = Batting average; SB = Stolen bases

Player	G	AB	R	H	2B	3B	HR	RBI	BB	AVG	SB
Greg Allen	25	35	7	8	1	0	1	6	2	.229	1
Abraham Almonte	69	172	26	40	8	3	3	14	20	.233	2
Trevor Bauer	2	3	0	0	0	0	0	0	0	.000	0
Michael Brantley	90	338	47	101	20	1	9	52	31	.299	11
Jay Bruce	43	149	21	37	9	2	7	26	18	.248	1
Carlos Carrasco	1	1	1	0	0	0	0	0	1	.000	0
Lonnie Chisenhall	82	236	34	68	17	1	12	53	25	.288	2
Mike Clevinger	1	1	0	0	0	0	0	0	0	.000	0
Yandy Díaz	49	156	25	41	8	1	0	13	21	.263	2
Edwin Encarnacion	157	554	96	143	20	1	**38**	**107**	**104**	.258	2
Yan Gomes	105	341	43	79	15	0	14	56	31	.232	0
Erik Gonzalez	60	110	18	28	6	0	4	11	3	.255	1
Brandon Guyer	70	165	23	39	7	1	2	20	15	.236	2
Austin Jackson	85	280	46	89	19	3	7	35	33	.318	3
Jason Kipnis	90	336	43	78	25	0	12	35	28	.232	6
Corey Kluber	1	2	0	1	0	0	0	0	0	.500	0
Francisco Lindor	**159**	**651***	99	178	44	4	33	89	60	.273	15
Michael Martinez	14	11	1	4	1	0	0	0	2	.364	0
Francisco Mejia	11	13	1	2	0	0	0	1	1	.154	0
Andrew Miller	5	1	0	0	0	0	0	0	0	.000	0
Tyler Naquin	19	37	4	8	2	0	0	1	2	.216	0
Roberto Pérez	73	217	22	45	12	0	8	38	26	.207	0
José Ramírez	152	585	**107**	**186**	**56***	**6**	29	83	52	**.318**	17
Daniel Robertson	32	80	9	18	4	1	1	7	7	.225	0
Carlos Santana	154	571	90	148	37	3	23	79	88	.259	5
Josh Tomlin	3	7	0	1	0	0	0	0	0	.143	0
Giovanny Urshela	67	156	14	35	7	0	1	15	8	.224	0
Bradley Zimmer	101	299	41	72	15	2	8	39	26	.241	**18**
**Team totals**	**162**	**5511**	**818**	**1449**	**333**	**29**	**212**	**780**	**604**	**.263**	**88**

=== Pitching ===
Note: W = Wins; L = Losses; ERA = Earned run average; GP = Games pitched; GS = Games started; SV = Saves; IP = Innings pitched; H = Hits allowed; R = Runs allowed; ER = Earned runs allowed; BB = Walks allowed; K = Strikeouts

Player	W	L	ERA	GP	GS	SV	IP	H	R	ER	BB	K
Cody Allen	3	7	2.94	69	0	**30**	67.1	57	24	22	21	92
Shawn Armstrong	1	0	4.38	21	0	0	24.2	23	12	12	10	20
Trevor Bauer	17	**9**	4.19	32	31	0	176.1	**181**	**84**	**82**	**60**	196
Craig Breslow	0	0	4.15	7	0	0	4.1	3	2	2	2	5
Carlos Carrasco	**18***	6	3.29	32	**32**	0	200.0	173	73	73	46	226
Mike Clevinger	12	6	3.11	27	21	0	121.2	92	46	42	**60**	137
Kyle Crockett	0	0	10.80	4	0	0	1.2	4	2	2	1	2
Nick Goody	1	2	2.80	56	0	0	54.2	39	20	17	20	72
Corey Kluber	**18***	4	**2.25***	29	29	0	**203.2**	141	56	51	36	**265**
Boone Logan	1	0	4.71	38	0	0	21.0	20	13	11	9	28
Michael Martinez	0	0	0.00	1	0	0	1.0	1	0	0	0	0
Zach McAllister	2	2	2.61	50	0	0	62.0	53	18	18	21	66
Ryan Merritt	2	0	1.74	5	4	0	20.2	26	6	4	4	7
Andrew Miller	4	3	1.44	57	0	2	62.2	31	11	10	21	95
Tyler Olson	1	0	0.00	30	0	1	20.0	13	0	0	6	18
Dan Otero	3	0	2.85	52	0	0	60.0	63	23	19	9	38
Danny Salazar	5	6	4.28	23	19	0	103.0	94	51	49	44	145
Bryan Shaw	4	6	3.52	**79**	0	3	76.2	71	36	30	22	73
Joe Smith	0	0	3.44	21	0	1	18.1	16	7	7	0	20
Josh Tomlin	10	**9**	4.98	26	26	0	141.0	166	80	78	14	109
**Team totals**	**102**	**60**	**3.30**	**162**	**162**	**37**	**1440.2**	**1267**	**564**	**529**	**406**	**1614**

== Postseason player stats ==
=== Batting ===
Note: G = Games played; AB = At bats; R = Runs scored; H = Hits; 2B = Doubles; 3B = Triples; HR = Home runs; RBI = Runs batted in; BB = Walks; AVG = Batting average; SB = Stolen bases

Player	G	AB	R	H	2B	3B	HR	RBI	BB	AVG	SB
Michael Brantley	3	11	0	1	0	0	0	0	1	.091	0
Jay Bruce	5	18	5	5	1	0	2	4	2	.278	0
Lonnie Chisenhall	4	5	1	0	0	0	0	0	0	.000	0
Edwin Encarnacion	3	7	1	0	0	0	0	0	1	.000	0
Yan Gomes	3	6	1	2	1	0	0	1	2	.333	0
Erik Gonzalez	2	2	0	0	0	0	0	0	0	.000	0
Austin Jackson	5	14	3	3	0	0	0	0	1	.214	1
Jason Kipnis	5	22	0	4	0	1	0	1	0	.182	0
Francisco Lindor	5	18	2	2	0	0	1	4	4	.111	0
Roberto Perez	4	10	1	3	0	0	1	2	2	.300	0
José Ramírez	5	20	2	2	0	0	0	0	2	.100	0
Carlos Santana	5	19	2	4	0	0	1	4	3	.211	0
Giovanny Urshela	5	12	0	2	0	0	0	1	0	.167	0
Totals	5	164	18	28	2	1	5	17	18	.171	1

=== Pitching ===
Note: W = Wins; L = Losses; ERA = Earned run average; G = Games pitched; GS = Games started; SV = Saves; IP = Innings pitched; H = Hits allowed; R = Total runs allowed; ER = Earned runs allowed; BB = Walks allowed; K = Strikeouts

Player	W	L	ERA	G	GS	SV	IP	H	R	ER	BB	K
Cody Allen	0	0	1.69	4	0	1	5.1	5	2	1	3	8
Trevor Bauer	1	1	0.00	2	2	0	8.1	6	4	0	3	11
Carlos Carrasco	0	0	0.00	1	1	0	5.2	3	0	0	3	7
Mike Clevinger	0	0	13.50	2	0	0	1.1	2	3	2	4	3
Corey Kluber	0	1	12.79	2	2	0	6.1	10	9	9	3	10
Andrew Miller	0	1	1.80	4	0	0	5.0	4	1	1	2	8
Tyler Olson	0	0	0.00	3	0	0	2.0	1	0	0	0	2
Danny Salazar	0	0	0.00	1	0	0	1.2	0	1	0	2	3
Joe Smith	0	0	0.00	4	0	0	2.1	0	0	0	1	3
Bryan Shaw	0	0	1.50	3	0	0	6.0	4	1	1	0	5
Josh Tomlin	1	0	0.00	2	0	0	3.0	0	0	0	0	4
Totals	2	3	2.68	5	5	1	47.0	35	21	14	21	64

== Awards and league leaders ==
=== Awards ===
- American League Pitcher of the Month:
  - 3× Corey Kluber: June, August, September
- American League Player of the Week:
  - 2× Corey Kluber: June 25, September 17
  - 2× José Ramírez: June 18, September 5
- Baseball America's All-MLB Team:
  - Francisco Lindor (SS)
  - José Ramírez (DH)
  - Corey Kluber (SP)
- Silver Slugger Awards:
  - José Ramírez (3B)
  - Francisco Lindor (SS)
- Wilson Defensive Player of the Year at first base: Carlos Santana

=== League leaders ===
==== Batting ====
- Ref:
- At bats: Francisco Lindor (651)
- Doubles: José Ramírez (56)
- Extra base hits: José Ramírez (91)
- Plate appearances: Francisco Lindor (723)

==== Fielding ====
- Ref:
- Assists at first base: Carlos Santana (95)
- Double plays turned at shortstop: Francisco Lindor (111)
- Fielding percentage at pitcher: Carlos Carrasco (1.000)
- Games at pitcher: Bryan Shaw (79)
- Total zone runs at first base: Carlos Santana (13)
- Range factor per nine innings at catcher: Roberto Pérez (10.80)

==== Pitching ====
- Wins Above Replacement: Corey Kluber (8.0)

== Farm system ==
Level	Team	League	Manager
AAA	Columbus Clippers	International League	Chris Tremie
AA	Akron RubberDucks	Eastern League	Mark Budzinski
A-Advanced	Lynchburg Hillcats	Carolina League	Tony Mansolino
A	Lake County Captains	Midwest League	Larry Day
A-Short Season	Mahoning Valley Scrappers	New York–Penn League	Luke Carlin
Rookie	AZL Indians	Arizona League	Anthony Medrano
Rookie	DSL Indians	Dominican Summer League	

== See also ==
- List of Major League Baseball annual doubles leaders
- List of Major League Baseball annual ERA leaders
- List of Major League Baseball annual shutout leaders
- List of Major League Baseball annual wins leaders
- List of Major League Baseball doubles records
- List of Major League Baseball longest winning streaks
- List of Major League Baseball pitchers who have thrown an immaculate inning
- List of Silver Slugger Award winners at shortstop
- List of Silver Slugger Award winners at third base
