= Alex Jackson (baseball) =

American baseball player (born 1995)

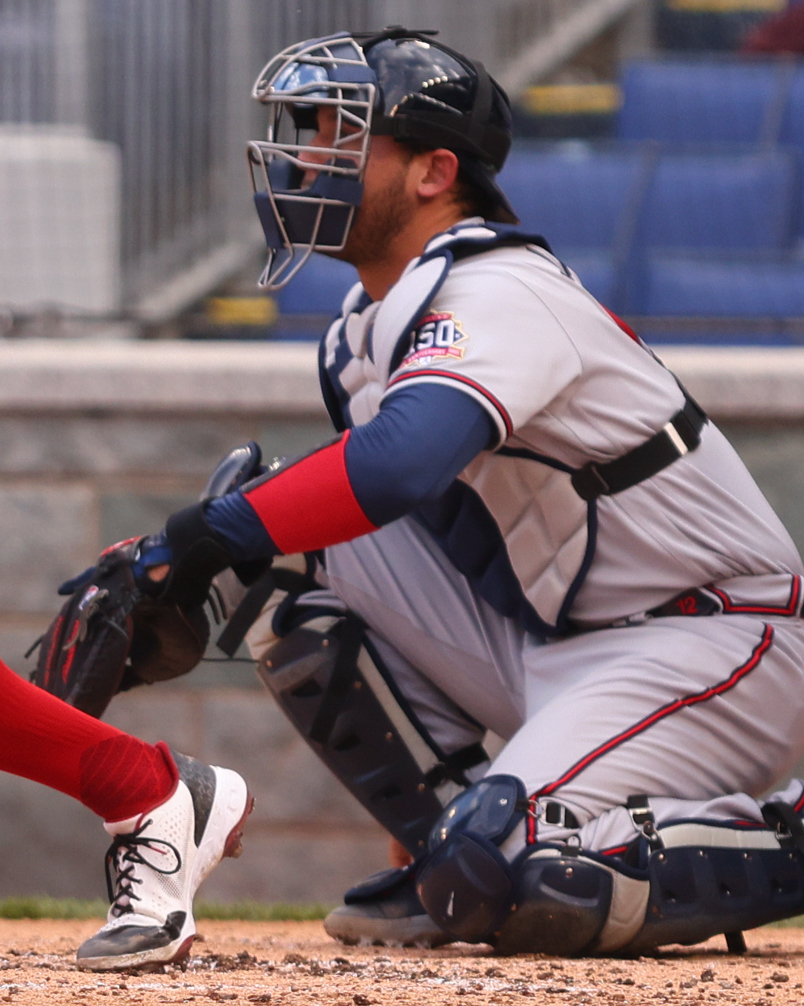
- Jackson with the Atlanta Braves in 2021

Free agent
- Catcher
- Born: December 25, 1995 (age 30); San Diego, California, U.S.
- Bats: Right Throws: Right

MLB debut
- April 7, 2019, for the Atlanta Braves

MLB statistics (through 2026 season)
- Batting average: .175
- Home runs: 12
- Runs batted in: 37
- Stats at Baseball Reference

Teams
- Atlanta Braves (2019–2021); Miami Marlins (2021); Milwaukee Brewers (2022); Tampa Bay Rays (2024); Baltimore Orioles (2025); Minnesota Twins (2026)

Alexander James Jackson (born December 25, 1995) is an American professional baseball catcher and outfielder who is a free agent. He has previously played in Major League Baseball (MLB) for the Atlanta Braves, Miami Marlins, Milwaukee Brewers, Tampa Bay Rays, Baltimore Orioles, and Minnesota Twins. He made his MLB debut in 2019 with the Braves.

== Amateur career ==
Jackson attended Rancho Bernardo High School in San Diego County, California. In 2012 and 2013, he played in the Under Armour All-America Baseball Game at Wrigley Field. As a junior, Jackson was ranked by MaxPreps as the best high school prospect for the 2014 class and was their Junior of the Year. Jackson verbally committed to the University of Oregon in March 2013. As a senior, he tied John Drennen for most career home runs in the San Diego section with 47. After the season, he won Baseball America's High School Player of the Year Award.

== Professional career ==
=== Seattle Mariners ===
Jackson was highly touted as the best hitter in the 2014 Major League Baseball draft. The Seattle Mariners selected him in the first round, with the sixth overall pick. He signed with the Mariners on June 23.

After signing, Jackson spent his first professional season with the AZL Mariners, slashing .280/.344/.476 with two home runs, 16 RBIs, and six doubles in 23 games. He began the 2015 season with the Clinton LumberKings, where he struggled, batting .157 with no home runs and 35 strikeouts in 28 games. The Mariners returned Jackson to extended spring training in May, and reassigned him to the Everett AquaSox when their season began in June. He spent the remainder of 2015 with Everett, batting .239 with eight home runs and 25 RBIs in 48 games. Jackson spent 2016 with Clinton, where he batted .243 with 11 home runs and 55 RBIs in 92 games.

=== Atlanta Braves ===
On November 28, 2016, the Mariners traded Jackson and Tyler Pike to the Atlanta Braves for Rob Whalen and Max Povse. Jackson began the 2017 season with the Florida Fire Frogs, and later that season, was promoted to the Mississippi Braves. He hit .267/.328/.480 with 19 home runs and 65 RBIs in 96 games between the two clubs.

The Braves added Jackson to their 40-man roster after the 2018 season. They promoted him to the major leagues on April 7, 2019, and he made his major league debut that afternoon. In 2020 for Atlanta, Jackson only received seven at bats, but recorded his first two major league hits.

On June 24, 2021, Jackson was placed on the 60-day injured list with a strained left hamstring. Jackson was reinstated from the injured list on July 21.

=== Miami Marlins ===
On July 30, 2021, Jackson was traded to the Miami Marlins in exchange for Adam Duvall.

=== Milwaukee Brewers ===
On April 6, 2022, Jackson was traded to the Milwaukee Brewers in exchange for Hayden Cantrelle and Alexis Ramirez. Jackson went 3–for–12 (.250) in 5 games for the Brewers, spending the majority of his time in Triple–A with the Nashville Sounds. His season ended prematurely when he was placed on the injured list on August 27 with left wrist inflammation. On December 2, he was removed from the 40-man roster and sent outright to Triple–A Nashville.

=== Tampa Bay Rays ===
On August 1, 2023, Jackson was traded to the Tampa Bay Rays in exchange for pitcher Evan McKendry. In 14 games for the Triple–A Durham Bulls, he batted .281/.305/.561 with four home runs and ten RBI. Jackson elected free agency following the season on November 7.

Jackson re–signed with the Rays organization on a minor league contract the following day. He began the 2024 season back with Durham, and hit .282 with 7 home runs and 18 RBI in 22 games. On May 3, 2024, the Rays selected Jackson's contract, adding him to the major league roster. In 58 games for Tampa Bay, he slashed .122/.201/.237 with three home runs and 12 RBI. On September 5, Jackson was designated for assignment by the Rays. He cleared waivers and was sent outright to Durham on September 7. Jackson elected free agency on October 1.

=== New York Yankees ===
On November 8, 2024, Jackson signed a minor league contract with the Cincinnati Reds organization. On December 20, the Reds traded Jackson and Fernando Cruz to the New York Yankees in exchange for Jose Trevino. He was released by the Yankees organization on March 22, 2025, and re-signed to a minor league contract the following day. In 26 appearances for the Triple-A Scranton/Wilkes-Barre RailRiders, Jackson batted .302/.387/.604 with eight home runs, 28 RBI, and one stolen base. Jackson was released by the Yankees organization on June 2. He re-signed with the Yankees on a new minor league contract on June 3.

=== Baltimore Orioles ===
On July 6, 2025, Jackson was traded to the Baltimore Orioles in exchange for international bonus pool space and a player to be named later or cash; the Orioles subsequently selected his contract and added him to their active roster. Jackson was the sixth catcher for the Orioles during the 2025 season. He, Jeremiah Jackson, and Jackson Holliday combined to retire Carson Kelly at home plate to end the first inning in a 5-3 away loss to the Chicago Cubs on August 3. This was the first time in MLB's Modern Era (since 1900) that a team started at least three players whose given name or surname was Jackson. Through August 10, Jackson had played in 18 games for the Orioles and had 10 hits, all of them for extra bases: seven doubles and three home runs. The 10 consecutive extra base hits to begin a career with a team is a modern-day record for any player with a new team. He broke his streak with a pair of singles on August 22. For the season, Jackson played in 36 games, and slashed .220/.290.473 with five home runs and eight RBI.

=== Minnesota Twins ===
On November 21, 2025, Jackson was traded to the Minnesota Twins in exchange for Payton Eeles. On March 25, 2026, Jackson was designated for assignment by the Twins after failing to make the team's Opening Day roster. He cleared waivers and was sent outright to the Triple-A St. Paul Saints the same day. In 24 appearances for the Saints, Jackson slashed .239/.295/.511 with seven home runs, 15 RBI, and one stolen base. On May 19, the Twins added Jackson to their active roster following an injury to Ryan Jeffers. Jackson was designated for assignment by the Twins on August 13. He cleared waivers and was sent outright to Triple–A St. Paul on August 16; however, Jackson was re–selected to Minnesota's active roster the next day following an injury to Austin Martin. He played in 33 total games for the Twins, slashing .304/.342/.406 with one home run and five RBI. Jackson was designated for assignment by Minnesota following the promotion of Aaron Sabato on September 21. On September 23, he cleared waivers and was sent outright to Triple-A St. Paul Saints. He elected free agency on November 2.
