= Max Povse =

American baseball player (born 1993)

- Pitcher
- Born: August 23, 1993 (age 32); Cary, North Carolina, U.S.
- Batted: Right Threw: Right

MLB debut
- June 22, 2017, for the Seattle Mariners

Last MLB appearance
- July 20, 2017, for the Seattle Mariners

MLB statistics
- Win–loss record: 0–0
- Earned run average: 7.36
- Strikeouts: 2
- Stats at Baseball Reference

Teams
- Seattle Mariners (2017)

Max Walter Povse (born August 23, 1993) is an American former professional baseball pitcher. He played in Major League Baseball (MLB) for the Seattle Mariners during the 2017 season.

== Background ==
Povse was born in Cary, North Carolina. He attended Green Hope High School in Cary. After high school, he was drafted by the Los Angeles Dodgers in the 42nd round of the 2011 Major League Baseball draft. However, he did not sign with the Dodgers, instead attending the University of North Carolina at Greensboro where he played college baseball for the UNC Greensboro Spartans.

== Career ==
=== Atlanta Braves ===
After his junior year, Povse was drafted by the Atlanta Braves in the third round of the 2014 Major League Baseball draft. He signed with the Braves and made his professional debut with the rookie-level Danville Braves. In an August start against the Burlington Royals, Povse did not allow a hit until the seventh inning, sending Danville to a 10–1 win. He finished 2014 with a 4-2 record and a 3.42 ERA in 12 games (11 starts) for Danville. Povse spent 2015 with both the Single-A Rome Braves and High-A Carolina Mudcats, posting a combined 5-5 record and 4.15 ERA in 17 starts, and started 2016 with Carolina. He was later promoted to the Double-A Mississippi Braves. Povse finished 2016 with a combined 9-6 record and 3.36 ERA in 26 starts.

=== Seattle Mariners ===
On November 28, 2016, Povse and Rob Whalen were traded to the Seattle Mariners organization in exchange for Alex Jackson and Tyler Pike. Povse started 2017 with the Double-A Arkansas Travelers and was called up to the Mariners on June 18. He made his MLB debut on June 22, allowing 3 runs in two-thirds of an inning. He finished his rookie season with a 7.36 ERA in 3 major league appearances. He spent the 2018 season in the minor leagues, posting a 5-9 record and 5.46 ERA in 18 games between Arkansas and the Triple-A Tacoma Rainiers.

Povse was designated for assignment on January 27, 2019, following the signing of Hunter Strickland. He cleared waivers and was sent outright to Triple–A Tacoma on February 1. He did not make an appearance for the organization on the season and was released by the Mariners on December 19.

=== High Point Rockers ===
On April 1, 2021, Povse signed with the High Point Rockers of the Atlantic League of Professional Baseball. Povse recorded a 9.82 ERA in 11 appearances with the Rockers.

=== West Virginia Power ===
On July 9, 2021, Povse was traded to the West Virginia Power of the Atlantic League of Professional Baseball. He became a free agent following the season.

=== Wild Health Genomes ===
On February 20, 2022, Povse signed with the Wild Health Genomes of the Atlantic League of Professional Baseball. Povse made 25 starts for the Genomes in 2022, recording a 6-10 record and 5.98 ERA with 129 strikeouts in 129 1/3 innings pitched. He became a free agent after the season.

=== Spire City Ghost Hounds ===
On March 20, 2023, Povse signed with the Spire City Ghost Hounds of the Atlantic League of Professional Baseball. In 25 games (8 starts) for Spire City, Povse pitched to a 4.61 ERA with 54 strikeouts across 54 2/3 innings of work.

=== Hagerstown Flying Boxcars ===
On November 2, 2023, Povse was drafted by the Hagerstown Flying Boxcars in the Ghost Hounds dispersal draft.
