= Rob Whalen =

American baseball player (born 1994)

- Pitcher
- Born: January 31, 1994 (age 32); Stroudsburg, Pennsylvania, U.S.
- Batted: Right Threw: Right

MLB debut
- August 3, 2016, for the Atlanta Braves

Last MLB appearance
- June 15, 2018, for the Seattle Mariners

MLB statistics
- Win–loss record: 1–3
- Earned run average: 5.75
- Strikeouts: 27
- Stats at Baseball Reference

Teams
- Atlanta Braves (2016); Seattle Mariners (2017–2018)

Robert Donald Whalen (born January 31, 1994) is an American former professional baseball pitcher who played in Major League Baseball (MLB) for the Atlanta Braves and Seattle Mariners.

== Early life ==
Whalen's parents are from Queens, New York City, and moved to the Pocono Mountains to raise their children. After Whalen's older sisters graduated from high school, the Whalens moved to Florida, where Whalen would have a better opportunity to pursue a career in baseball. He graduated from Haines City High School in Haines City, Florida.

== Professional career ==
=== New York Mets ===
The New York Mets selected Whalen in the 12th round of the 2012 Major League Baseball draft. Whalen had committed to attend Florida Atlantic University to play college baseball for the Florida Atlantic Owls.

After pitching for the Savannah Sand Gnats of the Single–A South Atlantic League during the 2014 season, Whalen pitched in the Arizona Fall League, where he worked on the development of his changeup. The Mets assigned him to the St. Lucie Mets of the High–A Florida State League to begin the 2015 season.

=== Atlanta Braves ===
On July 24, the Mets traded Whalen and John Gant to the Atlanta Braves for Juan Uribe and Kelly Johnson. The Braves assigned Whalen to their A Advanced affiliate, the Carolina Mudcats of the Carolina League. In 2016, Whalen began the season with the Mississippi Braves of the Double–A Southern League, and was promoted to the Gwinnett Braves of the Triple–A International League in July.

The Braves promoted Whalen to make his major league debut on August 3, 2016. He faced the Pittsburgh Pirates, and allowed four earned runs over five innings to earn the victory. Whalen was placed on the disabled list with a diagnosis of shoulder fatigue on August 25, and did not pitch for the rest of the season. In September, the Mississippi Braves named Whalen Pitcher of the Year.

=== Seattle Mariners ===
On November 28, 2016, Whalen and Max Povse were traded to the Seattle Mariners organization in exchange for Alex Jackson and Tyler Pike. Whalen was designated for assignment on September 1, 2018.

Whalen announced his retirement from professional baseball on February 25, 2019, citing his battle with depression and anxiety as the main reason for doing so.

=== New York Mets (second stint) ===
On January 27, 2020, Whalen came out of retirement and signed a minor league contract with the New York Mets organization. Whalen did not play in a game in 2020 due to the cancellation of the minor league season because of the COVID-19 pandemic. He was released by the Mets organization on May 20.

=== Minnesota Twins ===
On March 5, 2021, Whalen signed with the West Virginia Power of the Atlantic League of Professional Baseball. However, on May 5, before the ALPB season began, Whalen signed a minor league contract with the Minnesota Twins organization. In 11 appearances split between the Double-A Wichita Wind Surge and the Triple-A St. Paul Saints, Whalen struggled to an 0-4 record with an 8.63 ERA and 19 strikeouts. On August 10, 2021, Whalen was released by the Twins.

=== Washington Wild Things ===
On August 23, 2021, Whalen became the first former MLB player to sign with the Washington Wild Things. In 4 appearances in the regular season, Whalen went 2-0 with 15.1 innings pitched, a 1.76 ERA, 18 strikeouts and a 1.43 WHIP. In the postseason, he started 3 games and went 1-2 with 19 innings pitched, a 3.78 ERA, 22 strikeouts and a 1.16 WHIP. In the semi-finals, he lost Game 1 vs Équipe Québec but pitched 8 shutout innings in Game 5 to help clinch the finals vs the Schaumburg Boomers. In the finals, he lost Game 4 after pitching 7 innings with 3 runs allowed and struck out 9. Washington would ultimately lose the finals the next day, blowing a 2-1 series lead.

On February 10, 2022, Whalen re-signed with the Wild Things for the 2022 season. In 16 games for Washington, he posted a 12–2 record and 3.50 ERA with 79 strikeouts across 100 1/3 innings pitched. On December 5, Whalen was released by the Wild Things by having his contract option declined.

On December 14, 2022, Whalen signed with the Acereros de Monclova of the Mexican League. However, he was released prior to the season on April 10, 2023.

== Pitching style ==
Despite being an effective ground ball pitcher, Whalen stated that he would actively seek the strikeout whenever a two-strike count arose. By not focusing on the strikeout, at the suggestion of Mississippi Braves pitching coach Dennis Lewallyn, Whalen's strikeouts per nine innings actually rose throughout the 2016 season, and led to his promotion to the major leagues.
