= Tyler Olson (baseball) =

American baseball player (born 1989)

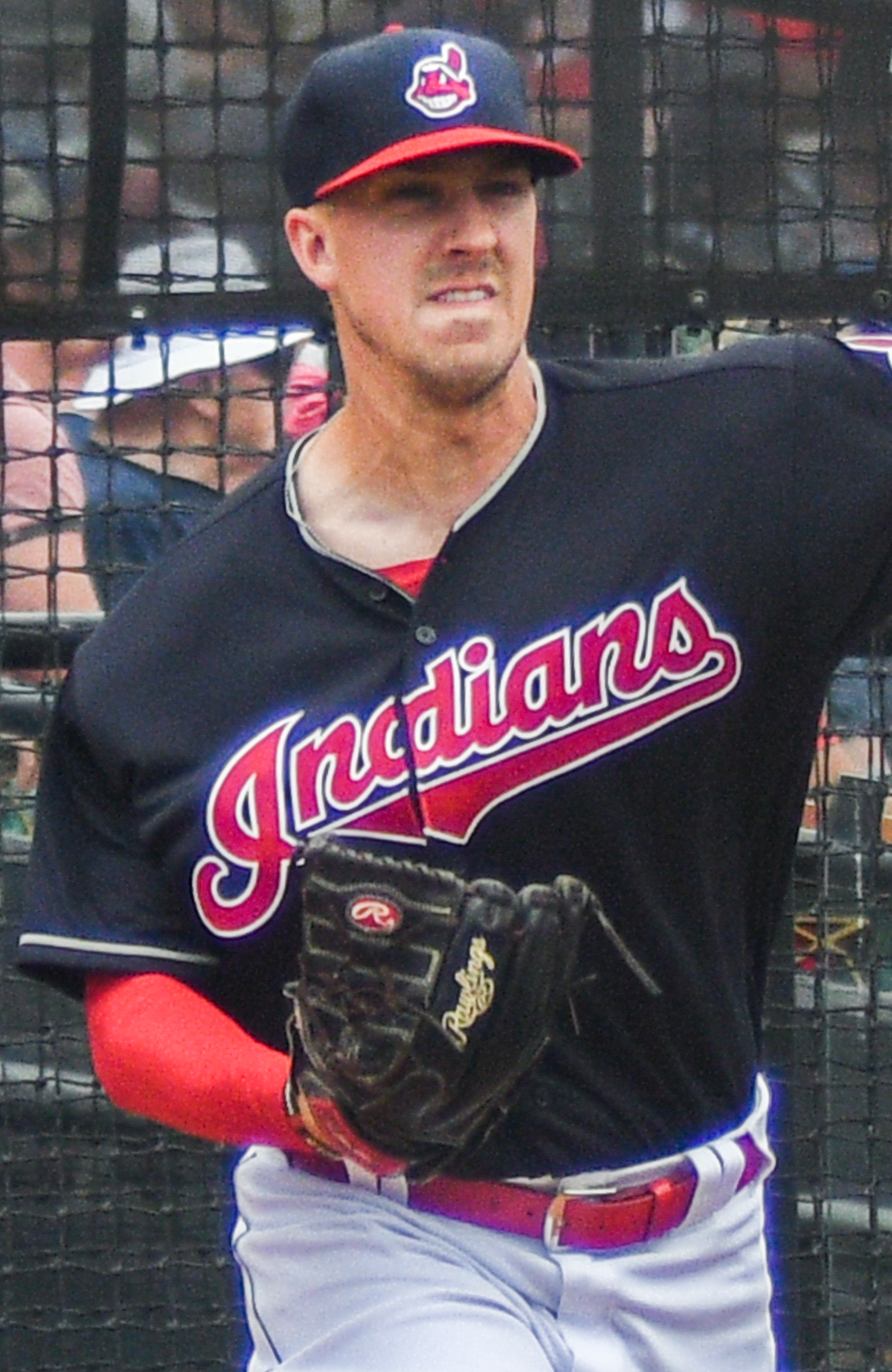
- Olson with the Cleveland Indians
- Pitcher
- Born: October 2, 1989 (age 36); Spokane, Washington, U.S.
- Batted: Right Threw: Left

MLB debut
- April 7, 2015, for the Seattle Mariners

Last MLB appearance
- August 1, 2019, for the Cleveland Indians

MLB statistics
- Win–loss record: 5–3
- Earned run average: 3.83
- Strikeouts: 94
- Stats at Baseball Reference

Teams
- Seattle Mariners (2015); New York Yankees (2016); Cleveland Indians (2017–2019)

Tyler Ray Olson (born October 2, 1989) is an American former professional baseball pitcher. He played in Major League Baseball (MLB) for the Seattle Mariners, New York Yankees, and Cleveland Indians.

== Amateur career ==
Olson attended University High School in Spokane Valley, Washington. He enrolled at Gonzaga University and pitched for the Gonzaga Bulldogs baseball team. He pitched for the Bulldogs as a freshman in 2009, but took a redshirt in 2010 when he suffered a shoulder subluxation. In 2012, his junior year, he was added to the Bulldogs' starting rotation, and pitched 110 innings.

The Oakland Athletics selected Olson in the 17th round of the 2012 Major League Baseball draft. Olson did not sign with Oakland, returning to Gonzaga for his senior year. As a senior, Olson had a 9-4 win–loss record and a 2.48 earned run average (ERA) in 101 2/3 innings pitched. He was named the West Coast Conference Pitcher of the Year.

== Professional career ==
=== Seattle Mariners ===
The Seattle Mariners selected Olson in the seventh round, with the 207th overall selection, of the 2013 MLB draft. He signed with the Mariners and began his professional career with the Everett AquaSox of the Low-A Northwest League. He started the 2014 season with the High Desert Mavericks of the High-A California League, and was promoted to the Jackson Generals of the Double-A Southern League during the season.

The Mariners invited Olson to spring training in 2015. He made the Mariners' Opening Day roster. He made his major league debut on April 7 and worked extremely efficiently, throwing only one pitch and getting two outs on a ground ball double play. He went on the disabled list with a knee injury in May. He was activated and optioned to the Tacoma Rainiers of the Triple-A Pacific Coast League (PCL) on June 2. Olson finished the 2015 season with a 1–1 win–loss record and a 5.40 ERA in 11 relief appearances for the Mariners.

=== New York Yankees ===
Seattle traded Olson to the Los Angeles Dodgers for cash on December 18, 2015, but he was designated for assignment by the Dodgers on January 6, 2016.

On January 12, 2016, the Dodgers traded Olson and infielder Ronald Torreyes to the New York Yankees for minor leaguer Rob Segedin and a player to be named later or cash. Olson began the 2016 season with the Scranton/Wilkes-Barre RailRiders of the Triple-A International League, and was promoted to the major leagues on April 15. The Yankees designated Olson for assignment on June 7.

=== Kansas City Royals ===
On June 14, 2016, the Kansas City Royals claimed Olson off of waivers and optioned him to the Omaha Storm Chasers of the PCL. In 5 games for Omaha, he recorded a 2.84 ERA with 2 strikeouts across 6 1/3 innings pitched. Olson was designated for assignment following the promotion of Brooks Pounders on July 5.

=== Cleveland Indians ===
The Cleveland Indians claimed him off waivers from the Royals on July 9, 2016, and assigned him to the Columbus Clippers of the International League.

Olson began the 2017 season with Columbus. The Indians purchased his contract on July 21, and he faced one batter against the Toronto Blue Jays that night. Olson remained on the Indians for the rest of the year. He appeared in 30 games, pitching 20 innings without giving up an earned run. He made the Indians' postseason roster and pitched in the postseason for the first time, appearing in 3 games without giving up an earned run.

Olson made the 2018 Indians Opening Day roster. On May 11, he was placed on the paternity list as he went to be with his wife for the birth of their first child. Olson finished the season with 43 appearances, logging in 27 1/3 innings. In 2019, Olson pitched in 30 2/3 innings, going 1–1 in 39 games. Following the 2019 season, Olson was outrighted off the Indians roster and became a free agent.

=== Chicago Cubs ===
On January 17, 2020, Olson signed a minor league contract with the Chicago Cubs. He did not play in a game in 2020 due to the cancellation of the minor league season because of the COVID-19 pandemic. Olson became a free agent on November 2.

=== Boston Red Sox ===
On April 6, 2021, Olson signed a minor league contract with the Boston Red Sox organization. In 31 relief appearances for the Double-A Portland Sea Dogs, he posted a 4-1 record and 2.61 ERA with 37 strikeouts over 31 innings of work. Olson elected free agency following the season on November 7.

== Personal ==
Olson and his wife welcomed their first child in May 2018.

Olson grew up a Seattle Mariners fan.
