= James Pazos =

American baseball player (born 1991)

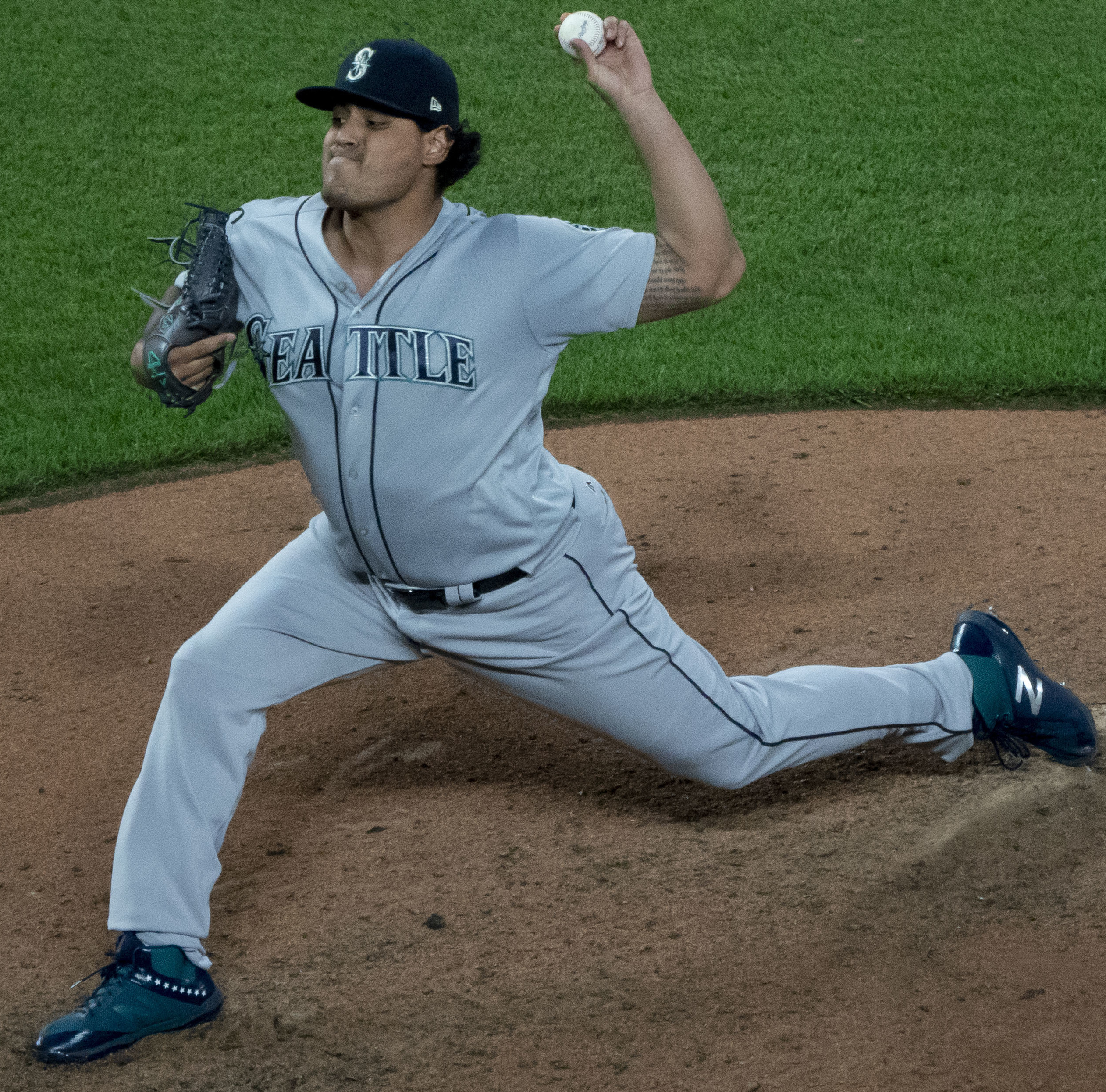
- Pazos with the Seattle Mariners
- Pitcher
- Born: May 5, 1991 (age 35); Gilbert, Arizona, U.S.
- Batted: Right Threw: Left

MLB debut
- September 5, 2015, for the New York Yankees

Last MLB appearance
- August 30, 2020, for the Colorado Rockies

MLB statistics
- Win–loss record: 9–6
- Earned run average: 3.95
- Strikeouts: 127
- Stats at Baseball Reference

Teams
- New York Yankees (2015–2016); Seattle Mariners (2017–2018); Colorado Rockies (2019–2020)

James Manuel Pazos (pronounced PAH-zohse; born May 5, 1991) is an American former professional baseball pitcher. He has previously played in Major League Baseball (MLB) for the New York Yankees, Seattle Mariners, and Colorado Rockies. He was drafted by the Yankees in the 13th round of the 2012 Major League Baseball draft.

== Early life ==
Pazos was born in Gilbert, Arizona, to Julio and Teresa Pazos. His mother competed in volleyball at South Carolina University, and his father competed in wrestling, football, and track at Arizona State University.

== Amateur career ==
Pazos attended and played baseball for Highland High School in Gilbert, Arizona, from which he graduated in 2009. He was second-team All-Region as a sophomore, All-Region as a junior, and All State and Fiesta Region Pitcher of the Year as a senior. He was drafted by the Tampa Bay Rays in the 40th round of the 2009 MLB draft but did not sign with Tampa Bay.

Pazos enrolled at Chandler–Gilbert Community College to play college baseball. He pitched for the Coyotes in 2010, and had a 9–4 win–loss record and a 1.94 earned run average (ERA) in 95 innings. After one year, he transferred to the University of San Diego to play for the Toreros for the next two seasons. As a sophomore, he was 3–5 with a 3.40 ERA and 41 strikeouts in 42 1/3 innings. As a junior, he was 5–1 and had a 2.14 ERA in 63 innings, a WHIP of 0.94, and averaged a strikeout an inning. He was named to the 2012 Rawlings All-West Coast Conference First Team.

== Professional career ==
=== New York Yankees ===
The New York Yankees selected Pazos in the 13th round of the 2012 MLB draft, and he signed for a signing bonus of $100,000. He made his professional debut with the Staten Island Yankees of the Class A-Short Season New York-Penn League, going 2–1 with three saves and a 1.79 ERA in 28 relief appearances, with 39 strikeouts in 40 1/3 innings, and was named a mid-season NYPL All Star.

He spent 2013 with Staten Island and the Charleston RiverDogs in the Class A South Atlantic League. He pitched to a combined 3–1 record with one save and 33 strikeouts and a 3.93 ERA in 34 1/3 innings pitched out of the bullpen. After the season, he played for the Scottsdale Scorpions in the Arizona Fall League, pitching 10 1/3 innings.

Pazos played in 2014 with the Tampa Yankees of the Class A-Advanced Florida State League and the Trenton Thunder of the Double-A Eastern League. He compiled a combined 0–3 record with 10 saves (4th-most among Yankee minor leaguers) and a 2.42 ERA with 75 strikeouts in 67 relief innings, averaging 10.1 strikeouts per 9 innings.

In 2015, between Trenton and the Scranton/Wilkes-Barre RailRiders of the Triple-A International League, he was 3–1 with three saves, a 1.27 ERA, and 49 strikeouts in 42 2/3 innings. The Yankees promoted Pazos to the major leagues on September 1, and he made his major league debut on September 5. With the Yankees in 2015, he pitched five scoreless innings.

In 2016, Pazos split time between the Yankees and the minors. In the minors, pitching primarily for Scranton/Wilkes-Barre, he was 2–2 with one save, a 2.32 ERA, and 47 strikeouts in 31 innings. In 3 1/3 innings for the Yankees, he gave up five earned runs while winning one game.

=== Seattle Mariners ===
The Yankees traded Pazos to the Seattle Mariners for Zack Littell on November 18, 2016. In 2017 with Seattle, Pazos was 4–5 with a 3.86 ERA and 65 strikeouts in 53 2/3 innings.

In 2018 with Seattle, he was 4–1 with a 2.88 ERA. In 50 innings in a career-high 60 games, he gave up 47 hits and 15 walks, and had 45 strikeouts. He threw a sinker 91.8% of the time, second only to Zack Britton.

=== Philadelphia Phillies ===
On December 3, 2018, the Mariners traded Pazos, Jean Segura, and Juan Nicasio to the Philadelphia Phillies for Carlos Santana and J. P. Crawford. Pazos began the 2019 season with the Lehigh Valley IronPigs of the International League. Pazos was designated for assignment on April 24, 2019, after pitching to a 6.14 ERA in both spring training and Triple-A.

=== Colorado Rockies ===
On April 26, 2019, Pazos was traded to the Colorado Rockies in exchange for infielder Hunter Stovall. Pitching for the Albuquerque Isotopes in 2019, Pazos was 1–3 with one save and a 8.80 ERA in 39 games (44 innings). He had a 1.74 ERA in 12 games (10 1/3 innings) for the Rockies. With the 2020 Colorado Rockies, Pazos appeared in 6 games, compiling a 16.88 ERA and 1 strikeout in 5 1/3 innings pitched. Pazos was designated for assignment by the Rockies on September 28, 2020. He elected free agency on October 9.

=== Los Angeles Dodgers ===
On December 11, 2020, Pazos signed a minor league contract with the Los Angeles Dodgers organization. He spent the entire 2021 season with the Triple-A Oklahoma City Dodgers, where he was 1–6 in 48 games for a 3.72 ERA. He elected free agency on November 7, 2021.

=== Staten Island FerryHawks ===
After sitting out the 2022 season, Pazos signed with the Staten Island FerryHawks of the Atlantic League of Professional Baseball on April 22, 2023. Pazos made 17 appearances for the FerryHawks, but struggled to an 11.48 ERA with 13 strikeouts in 13 1/3 innings pitched. He was released by Staten Island on June 20.
