= Tony Zych =

American baseball player (born 1990)

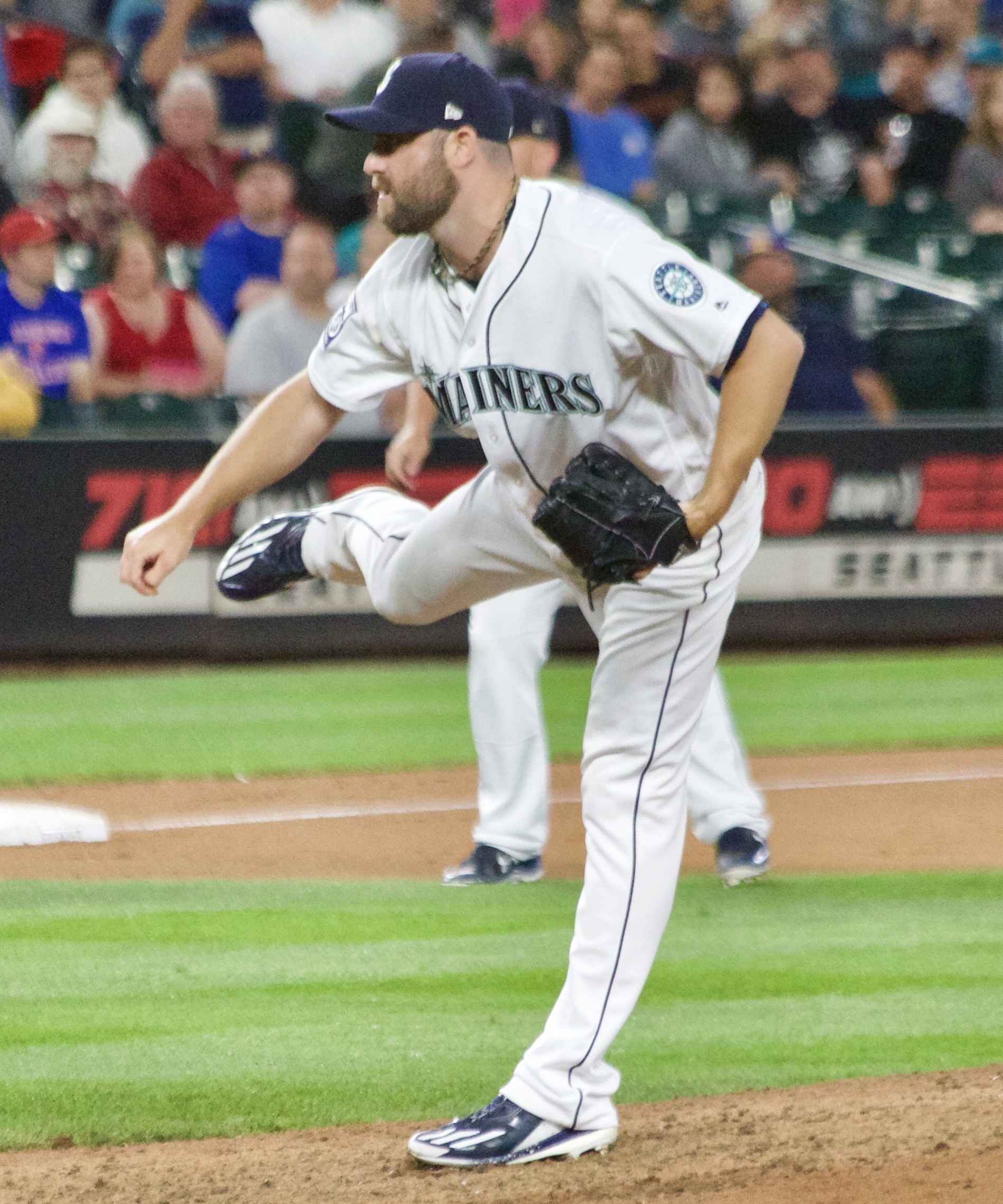
- Zych with the Seattle Mariners
- Pitcher
- Born: August 7, 1990 (age 36); Monee, Illinois, U.S.
- Batted: Right Threw: Right

MLB debut
- September 4, 2015, for the Seattle Mariners

Last MLB appearance
- August 19, 2017, for the Seattle Mariners

MLB statistics
- Win–loss record: 7–3
- Earned run average: 2.72
- Strikeouts: 80
- Stats at Baseball Reference

Teams
- Seattle Mariners (2015–2017)

Anthony Aaron Zych (/ˈzɪk/; born August 7, 1990) is an American former professional baseball pitcher. He pitched in Major League Baseball (MLB) for the Seattle Mariners from 2015 through 2017. Zych is notable as the last player in alphabetical order among all of those who have ever played in MLB.

== Amateur career ==
Zych is from Monee, Illinois. He traveled 35 miles (56 km) each way from Monee to attend St. Rita of Cascia High School in Chicago, Illinois, due to the higher level of competition offered in the Chicago Catholic League than he would have faced if he attended Crete-Monee High School. He played for the school's baseball team as a second baseman, and also occasionally served as their closing pitcher. As a senior, Zych had a .410 batting average and a 9–2 win–loss record.

After graduating from high school, the Chicago Cubs selected Zych in the 46th round of the 2008 Major League Baseball draft. He opted not to sign, and instead enrolled at the University of Louisville, where he played college baseball for the Louisville Cardinals. Competing in the Cape Cod Baseball League for the Bourne Braves in 2010, Zych received the league's Outstanding Relief Pitcher and Outstanding Pro Prospect awards. He served as the closer for Louisville.

== Professional career ==
=== Chicago Cubs ===
The Chicago Cubs drafted Zych in the fourth round, with the 129th overall selection, of the 2011 Major League Baseball draft, and he signed. The Cubs assigned Zych to the Boise Hawks of the Low–A Northwest League in 2011. He began the 2012 season with the Daytona Cubs of the High–A Florida State League, and was promoted to the Tennessee Smokies of the Double–A Southern League. After the 2012 season, the Cubs assigned Zych to the Mesa Solar Sox of the Arizona Fall League, where he had a 1.29 ERA in seven games. He returned to Tennessee in 2013, and had a 5–5 win–loss record and a 3.05 earned run average (ERA). He returned to Tennessee in 2014, and had a 4–5 win–loss record with a 5.09 ERA.

=== Seattle Mariners ===
On April 2, 2015, at the end of spring training, the Cubs traded Zych to the Seattle Mariners in exchange for a player to be named later or cash considerations in the amount of $1. The Cubs eventually chose the dollar over a player. In 2015, Zych pitched for the Double-A Jackson Generals of the Southern League and the Tacoma Rainiers of the Triple-A Pacific Coast League. Between the two teams, he pitched to a 2.98 ERA with 55 strikeouts in 48 1/3 total innings. The Mariners promoted him to the major leagues for the first time on September 1, 2015. He made his major league debut on September 4. He had a 2.45 ERA with 24 strikeouts in 18 1/3 innings pitched for Seattle. As of 2025, Zych's name ranks last alphabetically among the more than 21,000 players to play in the major leagues.

Zych began the 2016 season with the Mariners, and allowed four earned runs in 12 innings pitched in April. After an appearance on May 1, 2016, Zych went on the disabled list with tendinitis in his right rotator cuff. He rested the shoulder until August. He made two appearances for the Mariners towards the end of the season, before he was shut down due to the shoulder pain During the 2016–17 offseason, he had a biceps tendon transfer surgery in his shoulder: a surgery that had never before been performed in an MLB player. He missed ten games of the 2017 season in April while recovering from the offseason shoulder surgery, and went on the disabled list in August 2017 with an elbow strain. Through 2017, Zych pitched to a 7–3 win–loss record and 2.72 ERA. He missed much of the 2016 and 2017 seasons with elbow and shoulder injuries. Again limited by injuries during spring training in 2018, the Mariners released Zych on March 10, 2018.

=== New York Yankees ===
On February 12, 2020, Zych signed a minor league contract with the New York Yankees. Zych did not play in a game in 2020 due to the cancellation of the minor league season because of the COVID-19 pandemic. He became a free agent on November 2.
