= Tyler Smith (baseball) =

American baseball player (born 1991)

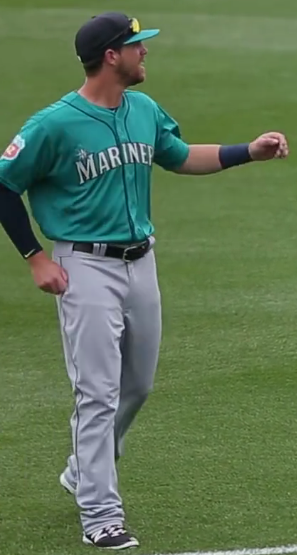
- Smith with the Seattle Mariners in 2016
- Infielder
- Born: July 1, 1991 (age 35); Long Beach, California, U.S.
- Batted: Right Threw: Right

MLB debut
- June 2, 2017, for the Seattle Mariners

Last MLB appearance
- June 20, 2017, for the Seattle Mariners

MLB statistics
- Batting average: .188
- Home runs: 0
- Runs batted in: 1
- Stats at Baseball Reference

Teams
- Seattle Mariners (2017)

Tyler Douglas Smith (born July 1, 1991) is an American former professional baseball infielder. He played in 10 Major League Baseball (MLB) games for the Seattle Mariners in June 2017.

== Playing career ==
=== Amateur ===
Smith attended Thousand Oaks High School in Thousand Oaks, California and played college baseball at Oregon State University. In 2012, he played collegiate summer baseball in the Cape Cod Baseball League for the Brewster Whitecaps.

=== Seattle Mariners ===
Smith was drafted by the Seattle Mariners in the 8th round (237th overall) of the 2013 Major League Baseball draft. From 2013 to 2016 in the minor leagues, Smith appeared for the rookie-level Pulaski Yankees, High-A High Desert Mavericks, Double-A Jackson Generals, and Triple-A Tacoma Rainiers.

Smith began the 2017 season with Tacoma. On June 2, 2017, Smith was selected to the 40-man roster and promoted to the major leagues for the only time after Jean Segura suffered an ankle injury. Smith got to bat toward the end of the game for a single plate appearance, facing Tampa Bay Rays reliever Ryne Stanek. On a 2–2 count Smith pulled the ball and recorded his first career hit, a double. In 10 games for the Mariners, he went 3-for-16 (.188) with 1 RBI. Smith was designated for assignment by Seattle on July 28.

=== Texas Rangers ===
On July 30, 2017, Smith was claimed off waivers by the Texas Rangers. On August 12, he was removed from the 40-man roster and sent outright to the Triple-A Round Rock Express. In 13 games for Round Rock, Smith slashed .188/.264/.229 with no home runs and one RBI.

=== Atlanta Braves ===
On December 14, 2017, the Atlanta Braves selected Smith from the Rangers in the minor league phase of the Rule 5 draft. He played in 52 games for the Triple-A Gwinnett Stripers in 2018, batting .219/.298/.363 with four home runs and 19 RBI. Smith was released by the Braves organization on July 9, 2018.

== Coaching career ==
In 2025, Smith was named as a coach for the Atlanta Braves rookie-affiliate FCL Braves. In 2026, he was named pitching coach for Atlanta's summer league-affiliate the DSL Braves.

== See also ==
- Rule 5 draft results
