= Andrew Moore (baseball) =

American baseball player (born 1994)

- Pitcher
- Born: June 2, 1994 (age 32); Springfield, Oregon, U.S.
- Batted: Right Threw: Right

MLB debut
- June 22, 2017, for the Seattle Mariners

Last MLB appearance
- June 4, 2019, for the Seattle Mariners

MLB statistics
- Win–loss record: 1–5
- Earned run average: 5.51
- Strikeouts: 33
- Stats at Baseball Reference

Teams
- Seattle Mariners (2017, 2019)

Andrew George Moore (born June 2, 1994) is an American former professional baseball pitcher. He played in Major League Baseball (MLB) for the Seattle Mariners. Prior to playing professionally, he played college baseball for the Oregon State Beavers. He currently serves as the pitching coach for the Lake County Captains, the High-A affiliate of the Cleveland Guardians.

== Playing career ==
Moore attended North Eugene High School in Eugene, Oregon. As a senior at North Eugene, he had a 0.76 earned run average (ERA) with 125 strikeouts in 72 and 2/3 innings. He played college baseball at Oregon State University for the Beavers. During his college career he was 27–9 with a 2.10 earned run average (ERA) and 251 strikeouts.

=== Seattle Mariners ===
Moore was drafted by the Seattle Mariners in the second round of the 2015 Major League Baseball draft. He made his professional debut with the Everett AquaSox. He started 2016 with the Bakersfield Blaze and was promoted to the Jackson Generals during the season.

Moore made his Major League Baseball debut on June 22, 2017, against the Detroit Tigers, going 7 innings, allowing 3 runs on 6 hits, no walks and 4 strikeouts for a quality start and the win. He shuttled between the majors and the minors, making 8 starts and two relief appearances in the majors for the remainder of 2017.

=== Tampa Bay Rays ===
On May 25, 2018, the Mariners traded Moore and Tommy Romero to the Tampa Bay Rays for Denard Span and Álex Colomé.

Moore was designated for assignment on April 29, 2019, following the promotion of Nate Lowe.

=== San Francisco Giants ===
On May 5, 2019, Moore was claimed off waivers by the San Francisco Giants. He was designated for assignment on May 11, 2019, without appearing for the Giants.

=== Seattle Mariners (second stint) ===
On May 17, 2019, Moore was claimed off waivers by the Seattle Mariners. He was designated for assignment by the Mariners in July and outrighted to the Triple–A Tacoma Rainiers. Moore was released by Seattle on October 22.

=== Cincinnati Reds ===
On April 1, 2020, Moore signed a minor league contract with the Cincinnati Reds organization. Moore did not play in a game in 2020 due to the cancellation of the minor league season because of the COVID-19 pandemic. He became a free agent on November 2.

=== Detroit Tigers ===
On January 16, 2021, Moore signed a minor league contract with the Detroit Tigers. He was released on August 5, 2021.

=== Toronto Blue Jays ===
On June 14, 2022, Moore signed a minor league contract with the Toronto Blue Jays. In 10 games (6 starts) between the Double–A New Hampshire Fisher Cats and Triple–A Buffalo Bisons, he compiled a 5.63 ERA with 29 strikeouts across 32 innings. Moore was released by the Blue Jays organization on August 24.

== Coaching career ==
On January 24, 2024, Moore was hired to serve as the assistant pitching coach for the Columbus Clippers, the Triple–A affiliate of the Cleveland Guardians.

In 2025, Moore was named as the pitching coach for Cleveland's High-A affiliate, the Lake County Captains. In 2026, Moore was once again named as an assistant pitching coach of the Triple-A affiliate Columbus Clippers.

In 2026, Moore was named as the pitching coach for Oregon State Beavers baseball
