= 2017 Texas Rangers season =

2017 Texas Rangers
- League: American League
- Division: West
- Ballpark: Globe Life Park in Arlington
- City: Arlington
- Record: 78–84 (.481)
- Divisional place: 4th
- Owners: Ray Davis & Bob R. Simpson
- Managers: Jeff Banister
- Television: Fox Sports Southwest (Dave Raymond, C.J. Nitkowski, Tom Grieve)
- Radio: KRLD 105.3 FM (English) (Eric Nadel, Matt Hicks, Dave Raymond); KZMP 1540 AM (Spanish) (Eleno Orlenas, Jerry Romo)
- Stats: ESPN.com; Baseball Reference

The 2017 Texas Rangers season was the franchise's 57th overall, their 46th in Arlington, Texas and their 24th at Globe Life Park in Arlington. The Rangers began the season on April 3 against the Cleveland Indians and finished the season on October 1 against the Oakland Athletics.

== Offseason and spring training ==
The Rangers posted a 17–16 win–loss record in pre-season spring training, as well as playing three tied games that were not included in the standings.

== Regular season ==
=== Season standings ===
==== American League West ====
AL West
Team	W	L	Pct.	GB	Home	Road
Houston Astros	101	61	.623	—	48‍–‍33	53‍–‍28
Los Angeles Angels	80	82	.494	21	43‍–‍38	37‍–‍44
Seattle Mariners	78	84	.481	23	40‍–‍41	38‍–‍43
Texas Rangers	78	84	.481	23	41‍–‍40	37‍–‍44
Oakland Athletics	75	87	.463	26	46‍–‍35	29‍–‍52

==== American League Wild Card ====
Division leaders
Team	W	L	Pct.
Cleveland Indians	102	60	.630
Houston Astros	101	61	.623
Boston Red Sox	93	69	.574

Wild Card teams (Top 2 teams qualify for postseason)
Team	W	L	Pct.	GB
New York Yankees	91	71	.562	+6
Minnesota Twins	85	77	.525	—
Kansas City Royals	80	82	.494	5
Los Angeles Angels	80	82	.494	5
Tampa Bay Rays	80	82	.494	5
Seattle Mariners	78	84	.481	7
Texas Rangers	78	84	.481	7
Toronto Blue Jays	76	86	.469	9
Baltimore Orioles	75	87	.463	10
Oakland Athletics	75	87	.463	10
Chicago White Sox	67	95	.414	18
Detroit Tigers	64	98	.395	21

==== Record against opponents ====
2017 American League record Source: MLB Standings Grid – 2017
Team	BAL	BOS	CWS	CLE	DET	HOU	KC	LAA	MIN	NYY	OAK	SEA	TB	TEX	TOR	NL
Baltimore	—	10–9	4–3	1–6	3–4	1–5	3–3	2–4	2–5	7–12	4–3	4–2	8–11	6–1	12–7	8–12
Boston	9–10	—	6–1	4–3	3–4	3–4	2–4	2–4	5–2	8–11	3–4	3–3	11–8	5–1	13–6	16–4
Chicago	3–4	1–6	—	6–13	10–9	4–2	10–9	3–4	7–12	3–4	1–5	3–4	3–3	4–3	3–3	6–14
Cleveland	6–1	3–4	13–6	—	13–6	5–1	12–7	6–0	12–7	5–2	3–4	4–2	4–3	6–1	4–2	6–14
Detroit	4–3	4–3	9–10	6–13	—	3–4	8–11	3–4	8–11	3–3	1–5	1–6	2–5	1–5	3–3	8–12
Houston	5–1	4–3	2–4	1–5	4–3	—	3–4	12–7	5–1	5–2	12–7	14–5	3–4	12–7	4–3	15–5
Kansas City	3–3	4–2	9–10	7–12	11–8	4–3	—	6–1	8–11	2–5	3–3	5–2	4–3	1–6	3–3	9–11
Los Angeles	4–2	4–2	4–3	0–6	4–3	7–12	1–6	—	2–5	4–2	12–7	12–7	3–4	8–11	4–3	11–9
Minnesota	5–2	2–5	12–7	7–12	11–8	1–5	11–8	5–2	—	2–4	3–3	3–4	2–4	4–3	4–3	13–7
New York	12–7	11–8	4–3	2–5	3–3	2–5	5–2	2–4	4–2	—	2–5	5–2	12–7	3–3	9–10	15–5
Oakland	3–4	4–3	5–1	4–3	5–1	7–12	3–3	7–12	3–3	5–2	—	7–12	2–5	10–9	2–5	7–13
Seattle	2–4	3–3	4–3	2–4	6–1	5–14	2–5	7–12	4–3	2–5	12–7	—	5–1	11–8	1–6	12–8
Tampa Bay	11–8	8–11	3–3	3–4	5–2	4–3	3–4	4–3	4–2	7–12	5–2	1–5	—	2–4	9–10	11–9
Texas	1–6	1–5	3–4	1–6	5–1	7–12	6–1	11–8	3–4	3–3	9–10	8–11	4–2	—	3–4	14–6
Toronto	7–12	6–13	3–3	2–4	3–3	3–4	3–3	3–4	3–4	10–9	5–2	6–1	10–9	4–3	—	9–11

==== Opening Day lineup ====
14	Carlos Gómez	CF
17	Shin-Soo Choo	DH
30	Nomar Mazara	RF
5	Mike Napoli	1B
12	Rougned Odor	2B
25	Jonathan Lucroy	C
13	Joey Gallo	3B
1	Elvis Andrus	SS
19	Jurickson Profar	LF
11	Yu Darvish	P

== Game log ==
2017 Game Log 78–84 (Home: 41–40; Away: 37–44)
April: 11–14 (Home: 8–8; Away: 3–6)

#	Date	Opponent	Score	Win	Loss	Save	Attendance	Record	Streak
1	April 3	Indians	5–8	Miller (1–0)	**Dyson** (0–1)	Allen (1)	48,350	0–1	L1
2	April 4	Indians	3–4	Carrasco (1–0)	**Pérez** (0–1)	Allen (2)	23,574	0–2	L2
3	April 5	Indians	6–9	Armstrong (1–0)	**Dyson** (0–2)	Shaw (1)	24,649	0–3	L3
4	April 7	Athletics	10–5	**Claudio** (1–0)	Alcantara (0–1)	—	34,235	1–3	W1
5	April 8	Athletics	1–6	Graveman (2–0)	**Darvish** (0–1)	—	44,410	1–4	L1
6	April 9	Athletics	8–1	**Pérez** (1–1)	Manaea (0–1)	—	36,905	2–4	W1
7	April 11	@ Angels	5–6 (10)	Bedrosian (1–0)	**Jeffress** (0–1)	—	34,044	2–5	L1
8	April 12	@ Angels	8–3	**Griffin** (1–0)	Chavez (1–1)	**Leclerc** (1)	34,599	3–5	W1
9	April 13	@ Angels	8–3	**Darvish** (1–1)	Nolasco (0–2)	—	30,255	4–5	W2
10	April 14	@ Mariners	1–2	Hernandez (1–1)	**Leclerc** (0–1)	Díaz (2)	41,855	4–6	L1
11	April 15	@ Mariners	0–5	Paxton (2–0)	**Cashner** (0–1)	—	34,927	4–7	L2
12	April 16	@ Mariners	7–8	Diaz (1–1)	**Dyson** (0–3)	—	19,678	4–8	L3
13	April 17	@ Athletics	7–0	**Griffin** (2–0)	Cotton (1–2)	—	10,406	5–8	W1
14	April 18	@ Athletics	2–4	Triggs (3–0)	**Darvish** (1–2)	Casilla (2)	12,091	5–9	L1
15	April 19	@ Athletics	1–9	Hahn (1–1)	**Pérez** (1–2)	—	14,031	5–10	L2
16	April 20	Royals	1–0 (13)	**Álvarez** (1–0)	Wood (0–1)	—	26,898	6–10	W1
17	April 21	Royals	6–2	**Hamels** (1–0)	Karns (0–1)	—	31,320	7–10	W2
18	April 22	Royals	2–1	**Bush** (1–0)	Wood (0–2)	—	41,446	8–10	W3
19	April 23	Royals	5–2	**Darvish** (2–2)	Hammel (0–2)	**Bush** (1)	37,177	9–10	W4
20	April 24	Twins	2–3	Hughes (3–1)	**Pérez** (1–3)	Kintzler (5)	19,027	9–11	L1
21	April 25	Twins	1–8	Santana (4–0)	**Cashner** (0–2)	—	20,568	9–12	L2
22	April 26	Twins	14–3	**Hamels** (2–0)	Rogers (1–1)	—	22,365	10–12	W1
23	April 28	Angels	3–6	Guerra (1–1)	**Jeffress** (0–2)	Alvarez (1)	28,968	10–13	L1
24	April 29	Angels	6–3	**Darvish** (3–2)	Chavez (2–4)	—	44,597	11–13	W1
25	April 30	Angels	2–5	Ramírez (3–2)	**Pérez** (1–4)	Norris (5)	38,804	11–14	L1

May: 15–14 (Home: 9–2; Away: 6–12)

#	Date	Opponent	Score	Win	Loss	Save	Attendance	Record	Streak
26	May 1	@ Astros	2–5	Devenski (2–1)	**Cashner** (0–3)	Giles (7)	22,556	11–15	L2
27	May 2	@ Astros	7–8	Hoyt (1–0)	**Kela** (0–1)	Harris (1)	26,208	11–16	L3
28	May 3	@ Astros	1–10	Morton (3–2)	**Martinez** (0–1)	—	27,439	11–17	L4
29	May 4	@ Astros	10–4	**Griffin** (3–0)	Musgrove (1–3)	—	27,391	12–17	W1
30	May 5	@ Mariners	3–1 (13)	**Bush** (2–0)	Pagan (0–1)	**Claudio** (1)	26,938	13–17	W2
31	May 6	@ Mariners	2–8	Pazos (1–1)	**Pérez** (1–5)	—	36,044	13–18	L1
32	May 7	@ Mariners	3–4	Rzepczynski (1–0)	**Dyson** (0–4)	Diaz (6)	32,518	13–19	L2
33	May 8	@ Padres	1–5	Cahill (3–2)	**Martinez** (0–2)	—	17,756	13–20	L3
34	May 9	@ Padres	11–0	**Griffin** (4–0)	Weaver (0–4)	—	14,224	14–20	W1
35	May 10	Padres	4–3	**Jeffress** (1–2)	Hand (0–2)	**Bush** (2)	24,350	15–20	W2
36	May 11	Padres	5–2	**Dyson** (1–4)	Maurer (0–2)	—	22,405	16–20	W3
37	May 12	Athletics	5–2	**Kela** (1–1)	Casilla (1–2)	—	35,625	17–20	W4
38	May 13	Athletics	6–5	**Barnette** (1–1)	Dull (1–2)	**Bush** (3)	37,898	18–20	W5
39	May 14	Athletics	6–4	**Álvarez** (2–0)	Madson (0–3)	**Bush** (4)	35,157	19–20	W6
40	May 16	Phillies	5–1	**Darvish** (4–2)	Eickhoff (0–4)	—	23,110	20–20	W7
41	May 17	Phillies	9–3	**Cashner** (1–3)	Eflin (0–1)	—	28,703	21–20	W8
42	May 18	Phillies	8–4	**Pérez** (2–5)	Rodriguez (1–2)	—	35,007	22–20	W9
43	May 19	@ Tigers	5–3	**Martinez** (1–2)	Norris (2–3)	**Bush** (5)	33,122	23–20	W10
44	May 20	@ Tigers	3–9	Verlander (4–3)	**Griffin** (4–1)	—	35,166	23–21	L1
45	May 21	@ Tigers	5–2	**Darvish** (5–2)	Boyd (2–4)	**Kela** (1)	24,080	24–21	W1
46	May 23	@ Red Sox	6–11	Porcello (3–5)	**Cashner** (1–4)	—	34,769	24–22	L1
47	May 24	@ Red Sox	4–9	Sale (5–2)	**Dyson** (1–5)	—	36,089	24–23	L2
48	May 25	@ Red Sox	2–6	Pomeranz (4–3)	**Martinez** (1–3)	—	33,484	24–24	L3
49	May 26	@ Blue Jays	6–7	Loup (2–0)	**Griffin** (4–2)	Osuna (8)	40,754	24–25	L4
50	May 27	@ Blue Jays	1–3	Estrada (4–2)	**Darvish** (5–3)	Osuna (9)	46,825	24–26	L5
51	May 28	@ Blue Jays	3–1	**Cashner** (2–4)	Biagini (1–3)	**Bush** (6)	46,188	25–26	W1
52	May 29	Rays	8–10	De Leon (1–0)	**Barnette** (1–1)	Colomé (14)	35,914	25–27	L1
53	May 30	Rays	9–5	**Kela** (2–1)	Whitley (1–1)	—	22,942	26–27	W1
54	May 31	Rays	5–7 (10)	Pruitt (4–1)	**Dyson** (1–6)	Colomé (15)	24,410	26–28	L1

June: 13–13 (Home: 5–7; Away: 8–6)

#	Date	Opponent	Score	Win	Loss	Save	Attendance	Record	Streak
55	June 2	Astros	1–7	Keuchel (9–0)	**Darvish** (5–4)	—	39,729	26–29	L2
56	June 3	Astros	5–6	Devenski (4–3)	**Cashner** (2–5)	Giles (15)	44,168	26–30	L3
57	June 4	Astros	2–7	Peacock (3–0)	**Pérez** (2–6)	—	39,204	26–31	L4
58	June 6	Mets	10–8	**Bibens-Dirkx** (1–0)	deGrom (4–3)	—	32,617	27–31	W1
59	June 7	Mets	3–4	Blevins (3–0)	**Bush** (2–1)	Reed (9)	32,477	27–32	L1
60	June 9	@ Nationals	5–2	**Cashner** (3–5)	Roark (6–3)	**Bush** (7)	38,332	28–32	W1
61	June 10	@ Nationals	6–3 (11)	**Kela** (3–1)	Kelley (3–2)	—	32,157	29–32	W2
62	June 11	@ Nationals	5–1	**Bibens-Dirkx** (2–0)	Scherzer (7–4)	—	32,027	30–32	W3
63	June 12	@ Astros	6–1	**Darvish** (6–4)	Musgrove (4–5)	—	25,698	31–32	W4
64	June 13	@ Astros	4–2	**Leclerc** (1–1)	Gregerson (2–2)	**Bush** (8)	27,615	32–32	W5
65	June 14	@ Astros	2–13	Martes (1–0)	**Cashner** (3–6)	—	37,221	32–33	L1
66	June 16	Mariners	10–4	**Ross** (1–0)	Paxton (5–2)	—	33,960	33–33	W1
67	June 17	Mariners	10–4	**Pérez** (3–6)	Gallardo (3–7)	—	35,928	34–33	W2
68	June 18	Mariners	3–7	Bergman (4–4)	**Darvish** (6–5)	—	31,552	34–34	L1
69	June 19	Blue Jays	6–7	Beliveau (1–0)	**Bush** (2–2)	Osuna (18)	25,115	34–35	L2
70	June 20	Blue Jays	6–1	**Martinez** (2–3)	Liriano (3–3)	—	24,169	35–35	W1
71	June 21	Blue Jays	5–7	Biagini (2–6)	**Ross** (1–1)	Osuna (19)	28,376	35–36	L1
72	June 22	Blue Jays	11–4	**Pérez** (4–6)	Stroman (7–4)	—	26,764	36–36	W1
73	June 23	@ Yankees	1–2 (10)	Shreve (2–1)	**Bush** (2–3)	—	39,602	36–37	L1
74	June 24	@ Yankees	8–1	**Bibens-Dirkx** (3–0)	Cessa (0–2)	—	40,225	37–37	W1
75	June 25	@ Yankees	7–6	**Martinez** (3–3)	Pineda (7–4)	**Bush** (9)	46,625	38–37	W2
76	June 26	@ Indians	9–15	Shaw (2–2)	**Scheppers** (0–1)	—	17,672	38–38	L1
77	June 27	@ Indians	2–1	**Kela** (4–1)	Allen (0–4)	**Bush** (10)	19,348	39–38	W1
78	June 28	@ Indians	3–5	Bauer (7–6)	**Darvish** (6–6)	—	21,200	39–39	L1
79	June 29	@ Indians	1–5	Kluber (7–2)	**Cashner** (3–7)	—	23,996	39–40	L2
80	June 30	@ White Sox	7–8	Swarzak (4–2)	**Bush** (2–4)	—	18,838	39–41	L3

July: 11–14 (Home: 5–8; Away: 6–6)

#	Date	Opponent	Score	Win	Loss	Save	Attendance	Record	Streak
81	July 1	@ White Sox	10–4	**Hamels** (3–0)	Holland (5–8)	—	22,915	40–41	W1
82	July 2	@ White Sox	5–6	Robertson (4–2)	**Leclerc** (1–2)	—	26,206	40–42	L1
83	July 3	Red Sox	5–7 (11)	Hembree (1–2)	Frieri (0–1)	—	45,448	40–43	L2
84	July 4	Red Sox	4–11	Price (4–2)	**Darvish** (6–7)	—	43,267	40–44	L3
85	July 5	Red Sox	8–2	**Cashner** (4–7)	Fister (0–2)	—	32,276	41–44	W1
86	July 7	Angels	10–0	**Hamels** (4–0)	Nolasco (4–10)	—	40,276	42–44	W2
87	July 8	Angels	5–2	**Ross** (2–1)	Chavez (5–10)	—	36,817	43–44	W3
88	July 9	Angels	0–3	Ramirez (8–7)	**Darvish** (6–8)	Norris (13)	28,384	43–45	L1
**88th All-Star Game in Miami, Florida**
89	July 14	@ Royals	5–3	**Pérez** (5–6)	Minor (5–2)	**Claudio** (2)	35,591	44–45	W1
90	July 15	@ Royals	1–0	**Leclerc** (2–2)	Duffy (5–6)	**Claudio** (3)	32,907	45–45	W2
91	July 16	@ Royals	3–4	Herrera (2–2)	**Grilli** (2–5)	—	23,163	45–46	L1
92	July 17	@ Orioles	1–3	Bleier (2–1)	**Cashner** (4–8)	Brach (15)	14,922	45–47	L2
93	July 18	@ Orioles	1–12	Bundy (9–8)	**Ross** (2–2)	—	18,119	45–48	L3
94	July 19	@ Orioles	2–10	Gausman (6–7)	**Pérez** (5–7)	—	15,693	45–49	L4
95	July 20	@ Orioles	7–9	Castro (2–1)	**Hamels** (4–1)	—	14,961	45–50	L5
96	July 21	@ Rays	4–3 (10)	**Claudio** (2–0)	Boxberger (2–1)	—	24,461	46–50	W1
97	July 22	@ Rays	4–3	**Cashner** (5–8)	Archer (7–6)	**Claudio** (4)	20,568	47–50	W2
98	July 23	@ Rays	6–5	**Bush** (3–4)	Boxberger (2–2)	**Leclerc** (2)	16,954	48–50	W3
99	July 24	Marlins	0–4	Conley (3–3)	**Perez** (5–8)	—	24,654	48–51	L1
100	July 25	Marlins	10–4	**Hamels** (5–1)	Straily (7–6)	—	25,074	49–51	W1
101	July 26	Marlins	10–22	Ureña (9–4)	**Darvish** (6–9)	—	26,471	49–52	L1
102	July 28	Orioles	8–2	**Cashner** (6–8)	Tillman (1–6)		36,270	50–52	W1
103	July 29	Orioles	0–4	Gausman (8–7)	**Bibens-Dirkx** (3–1)	Britton (7)	44,658	50–53	L1
104	July 30	Orioles	6–10	Miley (5–9)	**Perez** (5–9)	Britton (8)	32,437	50–54	L2
105	July 31	Mariners	4–6	Phelps (3–5)	**Claudio** (2–1)	Díaz (20)	22,294	50–55	L3

August: 16–12 (Home: 8–4; Away: 8–8)

#	Date	Opponent	Score	Win	Loss	Save	Attendance	Record	Streak
106	August 1	Mariners	7–8	Lawrence (1–3)	**Martinez** (3–4)	Diaz (21)	21,200	50–56	L4
107	August 2	Mariners	5–1	**Cashner** (7–8)	Miranda (7–5)	—	23,041	51–56	W1
108	August 3	@ Twins	4–1	**Griffin** (5–2)	Mejia (4–5)	**Claudio** (5)	22,903	52–56	W2
109	August 4	@ Twins	4–8	Colón (3–9)	**Perez** (5–10)	—	22,272	52–57	L1
110	August 5	@ Twins	4–1	**Hamels** (6–1)	Gibson (6–9)	—	27,415	53–57	W1
111	August 6	@ Twins	5–6	Berríos (10–5)	**Bibens-Dirkx** (3–2)	Belisle (1)	29,056	53–58	L1
112	August 8	@ Mets	4–5	Flexen (1–1)	**Griffin** (5–3)	Ramos (21)	37,326	53–59	L2
113	August 9	@ Mets	5–1	**Perez** (6–10)	Montero (1–8)	—	34,222	54–59	W1
114	August 11	Astros	6–4	**Hamels** (7–1)	Morton (9–5)	—	33,897	55–59	W2
115	August 12	Astros	8–3	**Ross** (3–2)	Fiers (7–7)	—	47,306	56–59	W3
116	August 13	Astros	1–2	Keuchel (10–2)	**Cashner** (7–9)	Giles (26)	31,517	56–60	L1
117	August 14	Tigers	6–2	**Pérez** (7–10)	Fulmer (10–10)	—	21,041	57–60	W1
118	August 15	Tigers	10–4	**Griffin** (6–3)	Verlander (8–8)	—	20,636	58–60	W2
119	August 16	Tigers	12–6	**Hamels** (8–1)	Bell (0–1)	—	22,713	59–60	W3
120	August 17	White Sox	9–8	**Bibens-Dirkx** (4–2)	Lopez (0–1)	**Claudio** (6)	23,459	60–60	W4
121	August 18	White Sox	3–4	Infante (1–1)	**Rodriguez** (0–1)	Minaya (1)	23,402	60–61	L1
122	August 19	White Sox	17–7	**Pérez** (8–10)	Holland (6–13)	—	33,441	61–61	W1
123	August 20	White Sox	2–3	González (7–10)	**Griffin** (6–4)	Minaya (2)	23,861	61–62	L1
124	August 21	@ Angels	5–3	**Hamels** (9–1)	Skaggs (1–4)	**Claudio** (7)	35,204	62–62	W1
125	August 22	@ Angels	1–10	Middleton (5–1)	**Ross** (3–3)	—	37,033	62–63	L1
126	August 23	@ Angels	7–5 (10)	**Claudio** (3–1)	Paredes (0–1)	**Barnette** (1)	35,497	63–63	W1
127	August 24	@ Angels	3–0	**Pérez** (9–10)	Scribner (2–1)	**Rodriguez** (1)	34,032	64–63	W2
128	August 25	@ Athletics	1–3	Graveman (4–4)	Martinez (3–5)	Treinen (9)	14,499	64–64	L1
129	August 26	@ Athletics	3–8	Manaea (9–8)	**Hamels** (9–2)	—	22,471	64–65	L2
130	August 27	@ Athletics	3–8	Cotton (7–10)	**Griffin** (3–7)	Treinen (10)	16,335	64–66	L3
131	August 29	@ Astros (Note: Games moved to Tropicana Field for flooding concerns due to Hurricane Harvey.)	12–2	**Pérez** (10–10)	Fiers (8–9)	—	3,485	65–66	W1
132	August 30	@ Astros	8–1	**Cashner** (8–9)	Keuchel (11–3)	—	6,123	66–66	W2
133	August 31	@ Astros	1–5	Devenski (7–3)	**Martinez** (3–6)	Giles (27)	3,385	66–67	L1

September/October: 12–17 (Home: 6–11; Away: 6–6)

#	Date	Opponent	Score	Win	Loss	Save	Attendance	Record	Streak
134	September 1	Angels	10–9	**Claudio** (4–1)	Bedrosian (4–4)	—	32,240	67–67	W1
135	September 2	Angels	4–7 (10)	Petit (4–0)	Leclerc (2–3)	Parker (5)	25,138	67–68	L1
136	September 3	Angels	7–6	**Pérez** (11–10)	Heaney (1–1)	**Barnette** (2)	28,783	68–68	W1
137	September 4	@ Braves	8–2	**Cashner** (9–9)	Dickey (9–9)	—	23,474	69–68	W2
–	September 5	@ Braves	Postponed (rain). Makeup date: September 6th as a doubleheader.						
138	September 6 (1)	@ Braves	12–8	**Bibens-Dirkx** (5–2)	Gohara (0–1)	—	19,971	70–68	W3
139	September 6 (2)	@ Braves	4–5	Teherán (10–11)	**Hamels** (9–3)	Vizcaíno (10)	20,364	70–69	L1
140	September 8	Yankees	11–5	**Pérez** (12–10)	Tanaka (11–11)	—	35,883	71–69	W1
141	September 9	Yankees	1–3	Robertson (7–2)	**Claudio** (4–2)	Chapman (17)	38,135	71–70	L1
142	September 10	Yankees	7–16	Green (4–0)	**Griffin** (6–6)	—	31,349	71–71	L2
143	September 11	Mariners	5–3	**Hamels** (10–3)	Miranda (8–7)	**Claudio** (8)	20,686	72–71	W1
144	September 12	Mariners	3–10	Gonzales (1–1)	**González** (7–11)	—	20,557	72–72	L1
145	September 13	Mariners	1–8	Leake (10–12)	**Pérez** (12–11)	—	23,083	72–73	L2
146	September 14	Mariners	4–10	Albers (5–1)	**Cashner** (9–10)	—	21,931	72–74	L3
147	September 15	@ Angels	6–7	Petit (5–0)	**Mendez** (0–1)	Parker (6)	41,409	72–75	L4
148	September 16	@ Angels	0–2	Bridwell (8–2)	**Hamels** (10–4)	Petit (4)	40,719	72–76	L5
149	September 17	@ Angels	4–2	**González** (8–11)	Richards (0–2)	**Diekman** (1)	36,709	73–76	W1
150	September 19	@ Mariners	3–1	**Barnette** (2–1)	Vincent (3–3)	**Claudio** (9)	17,251	74–76	W2
151	September 20	@ Mariners	8–6	**Cashner** (10–10)	Hernández (5–5)	**Claudio** (10)	15,962	75–76	W3
152	September 21	@ Mariners	4–2	**Hamels** (11–4)	Paxton (12–5)	**Kela** (2)	14,849	76–76	W4
153	September 22	@ Athletics	1–4	Graveman (6–4)	**Martinez** (3–7)	Treinen (13)	13,848	76–77	L1
154	September 23	@ Athletics	0–1	Alcántara (1–1)	**González** (8–12)	Treinen (14)	38,034	76–78	L2
155	September 24	@ Athletics	1–8	Cotton (9–10)	**Perez** (12–12)	—	18,601	76–79	L3
156	September 25	Astros	2–11	McHugh (4–2)	**Cashner** (10–11)	—	30,390	76–80	L4
157	September 26	Astros	3–14	Keuchel (14–5)	**Hamels** (11–5)	—	28,976	76–81	L5
158	September 27	Astros	2–12	Verlander (15–8)	**Martinez** (3–8)	—	26,053	76–82	L6
159	September 28	Athletics	1–4	Manaea (12–10)	**González** (8–13)	Treinen (15)	41,664	76–83	L7
160	September 29	Athletics	5–3	**Perez** (13–12)	Alcántara (1–2)	**Claudio** (11)	28,459	77–83	W1
161	September 30	Athletics	8–4	**Cashner** (11–11)	Gossett (4–11)	—	32,759	78–83	W2
162	October 1	Athletics	2–5	Mengden (3–2)	**Hamels** (11–6)	Treinen (16)	33,961	78–84	L1

Legend: = Win = Loss = Postponement
Bold = Rangers team member

== Roster ==
2017 Texas Rangers
Roster
Pitchers: 39 Darío Álvarez; 43 Tony Barnette; 60 Anthony Bass; 56 Austin Bibens-Dirkx; 51 Matt Bush; 54 Andrew Cashner; 57 Preston Claiborne; 58 Alex Claudio; 11 Yu Darvish; 41 Jake Diekman; 47 Sam Dyson; 38 Paolo Espino; 49 Ernesto Frieri; 45 Nick Gardewine; 36 Dillon Gee; 36 Miguel González; 64 A. J. Griffin; 37 Jason Grilli; 35 Cole Hamels; 49 Mike Hauschild; 23 Jeremy Jeffress; 50 Keone Kela; 62 José Leclerc; 49 Jhan Mariñez; 22 Nick Martinez; 65 Yohander Méndez; 33 Martín Pérez; 68 Ricardo Rodríguez; 44 Tyson Ross; 52 Tanner Scheppers	Catchers: 61 Robinson Chirinos; 53 A. J. Jiménez; 25 Jonathan Lucroy; 63 Brett Nicholas; Infielders: 1 Elvis Andrus; 29 Adrián Beltré; 13 Joey Gallo; 23 Philip Gosselin; 38 Pete Kozma; 15 Will Middlebrooks; 5 Mike Napoli; 12 Rougned Odor; 18 Drew Robinson	Outfielders: 55 Willie Calhoun; 17 Shin-Soo Choo; 3 Delino DeShields; 14 Carlos Gómez; 31 Jared Hoying; 30 Nomar Mazara; 19 Jurickson Profar; 16 Ryan Rua	Manager: 28 Jeff Banister; Coaches: 27 Tony Beasley (third base); 82 Josh Bonifay (field); 46 Doug Brocail (pitching); 24 Steve Buechele (bench); 66 Josh Frasier (bullpen catcher); 40 Brad Holman (bullpen); 9 Anthony Iapoce (hitting); 0 Justin Mashore (assistant hitting); 4 Héctor Ortiz (first base)

== Player stats ==
=== Batting ===
Note: G = Games played; AB = At bats; R = Runs; H = Hits; 2B = Doubles; 3B = Triples; HR = Home runs; RBI = Runs batted in; SB = Stolen bases; BB = Walks; AVG = Batting average; SLG = Slugging average

Player	G	AB	R	H	2B	3B	HR	RBI	SB	BB	AVG	SLG
Elvis Andrus	158	643	100	191	44	4	20	88	25	38	.297	.471
Rougned Odor	162	607	79	124	21	3	30	75	15	32	.204	.397
Nomar Mazara	148	554	64	140	30	2	20	101	2	55	.253	.422
Shin-Soo Choo	149	544	96	142	20	1	22	78	12	77	.261	.423
Joey Gallo	145	449	85	94	18	3	41	80	7	75	.209	.537
Mike Napoli	124	425	60	82	11	1	29	66	1	49	.193	.428
Delino DeShields Jr.	120	376	75	101	15	2	6	22	29	44	.269	.367
Carlos Gómez	105	368	51	94	23	1	17	51	13	31	.255	.462
Adrián Beltré	94	340	47	106	22	1	17	71	1	39	.312	.532
Jonathan Lucroy	77	281	27	68	15	0	4	27	1	19	.242	.338
Robinson Chirinos	88	263	46	67	13	1	17	38	1	34	.255	.506
Ryan Rua	63	129	17	28	6	0	3	12	2	14	.217	.333
Drew Robinson	48	107	11	24	5	0	6	13	0	14	.224	.439
Jared Hoying	36	72	13	16	3	0	1	7	3	4	.222	.306
Brett Nicholas	21	63	7	15	4	0	2	11	0	2	.238	.397
Jurickson Profar	22	58	8	10	2	0	0	5	1	9	.172	.207
Will Middlebrooks	22	38	5	8	2	2	0	3	0	1	.211	.368
Pete Kozma	28	36	4	4	0	0	1	2	0	2	.111	.194
Willie Calhoun	13	34	3	9	0	0	1	4	0	2	.265	.353
A. J. Jiménez	7	12	0	1	0	0	0	0	0	0	.083	.083
Phil Gosselin	12	8	0	1	1	0	0	0	0	0	.125	.250
Pitcher totals	162	23	1	1	0	0	0	2	0	3	.043	.043
Team totals	162	5430	799	1326	255	21	237	756	113	544	.244	.430

=== Pitching ===
Note: W = Wins; L = Losses; ERA = Earned run average; G = Games pitched; GS = Games started; SV = Saves; IP = Innings pitched; H = Hits allowed; R = Runs allowed; ER = Earned runs allowed; BB = Walks allowed; SO = Strikeouts

Player	W	L	ERA	G	GS	SV	IP	H	R	ER	BB	SO
Martín Pérez	13	12	4.82	32	32	0	185.0	221	108	99	63	115
Andrew Cashner	11	11	3.40	28	28	0	166.2	156	75	63	64	86
Cole Hamels	11	6	4.20	24	24	0	148.0	125	74	69	53	105
Yu Darvish	6	9	4.01	22	22	0	137.0	115	63	61	45	148
Nick Martinez	3	8	5.66	23	18	0	111.1	124	74	70	28	67
Alex Claudio	4	2	2.50	70	1	11	82.2	71	26	23	15	56
A.J. Griffin	6	6	5.94	18	15	0	77.1	76	52	51	28	61
Austin Bibens-Dirkx	5	2	4.67	24	6	0	69.1	74	36	36	20	38
Tony Barnette	2	1	5.49	50	0	2	57.1	64	36	35	22	57
Matt Bush	3	4	3.78	57	0	10	52.1	57	30	22	19	58
Tyson Ross	3	3	7.71	12	10	0	49.0	53	46	42	37	36
José Leclerc	2	3	3.94	47	0	2	45.2	23	21	20	40	60
Jeremy Jeffress	1	2	5.31	39	0	0	40.2	49	25	24	19	29
Keone Kela	4	1	2.79	39	0	2	38.2	18	12	12	17	51
Miguel González	1	3	6.45	5	5	0	22.1	22	16	16	8	15
Jason Grilli	0	1	5.59	20	0	0	19.1	22	13	12	9	25
Sam Dyson	1	6	10.80	17	0	0	16.2	31	23	20	12	7
Darío Álvarez	2	0	2.76	20	0	0	16.1	19	8	5	14	17
Ricardo Rodríguez	0	1	6.23	16	0	1	13.0	17	9	9	4	11
Dillon Gee	0	0	4.15	4	1	0	13.0	17	10	6	6	10
Yohander Méndez	0	1	5.11	7	0	0	12.1	13	9	7	3	7
Jake Diekman	0	0	2.53	11	0	1	10.2	4	3	3	10	13
Nick Gardewine	0	0	5.63	12	0	0	8.0	10	8	5	7	3
Mike Hauschild	0	0	11.25	4	0	0	8.0	14	10	10	2	7
Jhan Mariñez	0	0	2.35	4	0	0	7.2	7	2	2	3	5
Ernesto Frieri	0	1	5.14	6	0	0	7.0	6	4	4	6	5
Paolo Espino	0	0	5.68	6	0	0	6.1	6	4	4	2	7
Anthony Bass	0	0	14.29	2	0	0	5.2	14	9	9	0	1
Tanner Scheppers	0	1	6.75	5	0	0	4.0	5	3	3	3	5
Preston Claiborne	0	0	13.50	1	0	0	2.0	5	3	3	0	2
Brett Nicholas	0	0	36.00	1	0	0	1.0	5	4	4	0	0
Team totals	78	84	4.66	162	162	29	1434.1	1443	816	742	559	1107

== Farm system ==
Level	Team	League	Manager
AAA	Round Rock Express	Pacific Coast League	Jason Wood
AA	Frisco RoughRiders	Texas League	Joe Mikulik
A-Advanced	Down East Wood Ducks	Carolina League	Howard Johnson
A	Hickory Crawdads	South Atlantic League	Spike Owen
A-Short Season	Spokane Indians	Northwest League	Matt Hagen
Rookie	AZL Rangers	Arizona League	Matt Siegel
Rookie	DSL Rangers	Dominican Summer League	
