= Chris Cortez =

Chris Cortez may refer to:

- Chris Cortez (baseball) (born 2002), American baseball player
- Chris Cortez (soccer) (born 1988), American soccer player
