= Silverado High School (Las Vegas) =

Coordinates: 36.02341°N 115.12973°W

Silverado College Preparatory & Career/Technical High School
- 1650 Silver Hawk Ave; Las Vegas, NV; USA

Information
- Type: Public
- Motto: Excellence in Action
- Established: 1994
- President: Neha Johal
- Principal: Jaime Ditto
- Staff: 85.00 (FTE)
- Grades: 9-12
- Enrollment: 1,914 (2024-2025)
- Student to teacher ratio: 22.52
- Campus: Suburban
- Colors: Purple, teal, and white
- Team name: Silverado Skyhawks
- Website: www.silveradohslv.net

Silverado High School (SHS) is a public secondary school in Las Vegas, Nevada, U.S. that is a part of the Clark County School District. Its mascot is the Skyhawk, and the school's colors are purple, teal, and white.

== Notable alumni ==
- Amanda Bingson (2008) - 2012 Olympian in hammer throw
- Chasen Bradford (2008) - MLB pitcher for the New York Mets
- Chris Cortez (2021) - baseball player
- Scott Fischman (1998) - professional poker player
- Ben Jacobs (2006) - Former NFL linebacker for the Carolina Panthers
- Mike Meyers (2012) - Major League Baseball outfielder
- Drew Robinson (2010) - Outfielder/Infielder for the San Francisco Giants

== Extracurricular activities ==
=== Athletics ===
- Men's Baseball
  - Mike Meyers played shortstop for the school baseball team. In 2010, he was voted First Team All Southeast League. In 2011, he was voted First Team Class 4-A All-Southern Nevada. In 2012, he was voted to the 2012 Louisville Slugger Pre-Season High School First Team All-America team, and was voted 2012 First Team Nevada All-State. He holds the high school's career (192) and single-season (59) records for runs scored, and its career records in doubles (50), triples (18), and steals (31).
  - State Champions
    - 2000
- M Tennis
  - (2005) AAAA Men's Doubles Champion. Trenton Alenik and Chris Painter (32-0)
- W Tennis
  - (2009) Women's Doubles State Champion. Kristen Santero and Nicole Santero
  - (2006, 2007, 2008) Women's Doubles State Runner-Up. Kristen Santero and Nicole Santero
  - (2006, 2007, 2008, 2009) Women's Doubles Regional Champion. Kristen Santero and Nicole Santero
- Football
  - (2007–08) Southeast Division Champions Record (10-1)
  - (2021) State Champion
  - (2022) State Champion
- Cheer
  - (2007) State Runner-up
  - (2008) State Runner-up
  - (2009) State Champion
  - (2010) State Champion
  - (2010) National Finalist
  - (2011) National Runner-Up
- Boys' Basketball
  - Southeast Division Champion (2006)
- Girls' Basketball
  - Region Champs 2007, 2008
- Track
  - Men's State Champions 2005,2011,2016
  - Men's Sunrise Champions
    - 2011, 2007, 2006, 2005, 2004, 2002, 2001, 1999, 2016
  - Women's Sunrise Region Champions
    - 2011, 2006, 2005, 2003, 2002, 2001, 2000, 1999
- Men's Soccer
  - (1999-2000) & (2004-2005)State Champions
    - Captain Michael Eshragh (2000) Gatorade Player of the Year
      - Captains Kasey Chapman, James Eshragh, Ben Holt (2005)
- Women's Volleyball
  - Sunrise region Champions
    - 2006, 2007, 2008
  - State Champions 2007
  - State Champions 2009
  - State Champions 2010
- Men's Swimming
  - Regional Champions
    - 2000, 2001
  - State Champions
    - 2001
  - State Runners Up
    - 2000, 2002
- Bowling
  - State Champions
    - 2000 (School's first State Championship)
- "Men's Volleyball"
  - Regional Champions
    - 2003, 2006
  - State Runner Up
    - 2006, 2012
  - Dance

== Band ==
- Members who played professionally.
  - Richard Ginocchi - Trombone
    - 2000-2009 at various Las Vegas Strip locations and local jazz shows.
- Wind Symphony
  - Golden Division
    - Worldstrides Heritage Performance 2012 (San Diego)
      - 1st Place
  - Superior Ratings at every CCSD Advanced Band Festival
- Symphonic Band
  - Silver Division
    - Worldstrides Heritage Performance 2012 (San Diego)
      - 1st Place
- Marching Band

| Competition/Year | 2005 | 2006 | 2007 | 2008 | 2009 | 2010 |
|---|---|---|---|---|---|---|
| Henderson BandFest | N/A | N/A | N/A | N/A | 2nd Place (AAAA) | N/A |
| Summerlin Spectacular | N/A | 2nd Place (AAA) | 2nd Place (Open) | N/A | N/A | 4th Place (Open) |
| LVI Prelims | 6th Place (Open) | N/A | N/A | N/A | N/A | N/A |
| LVI Finals | 11th Place (IND) | 9th Place (IND) | 6th Place (IND) | 5th Place (IND) | 6th Place (IND) | 2nd Place (IND) |

| Competition/Year | 2011 | 2012 | 2013 | 2014 | 2015 | 2016 |
|---|---|---|---|---|---|---|
| Henderson BandFest | 3rd Place (Open) | 2nd Place (Sapphire) | N/A | N/A | 3rd Place (Sapphire) | 3rd Place (Onyx) |
| Summerlin Spectacular | 3rd Place (Open) | 4th Place (Open) | 2nd Place (Sapphire) | 1st Place (Sapphire) | 4th Place (Sapphire) | 1st Place (Onyx) |
| LVI Prelims | N/A | 5th Place (Sapphire) | 3rd Place (Sapphire) | 5th Place (Sapphire) | 8th Place (Sapphire) | 4th Place (Onyx) |
| LVI Finals | 9th Place (IND) | 4th Place (MBOS) | 6th Place (MBOS) | 6th Place (MBOS) | N/A | 5th Place (MBOS) |

| Competition/Year | 2017 | 2018 |
|---|---|---|
| Henderson BandFest | N/A | 2nd Place (Onyx) |
| Tournament on the Turf | 2nd Place (Black Opal) | 2nd Place (Onyx) |
| LVI Prelims | 2nd Place (Black Opal) | 1st Place (Onyx) |
| LVI Finals | 3rd Place (MBOS) | 3rd Place (MBOS) |

| Competition/Year | 2019 | 2020 |
|---|---|---|
| Henderson BandFest | 1st Place (Onyx) | TBA |
| Tournament on the Turf | 3rd Place (Onyx) | TBA |
| MBOS Championships | 1st Place (Onyx) | TBA |
| MBOS Champs. Finals | 3rd Place (MBOS) | TBA |

- Additional Competitions
  - 2007 Rubidoux Tournament (SCSBOA)
    - 1st Place (4A Class)
  - 2008 Boulder City Invitational (IND)
    - 2nd Place (Open Class)
  - 2009 West Covina Field Tournament (SCSBOA)
    - 1st Place (4A Class)
  - 2010 West Covina Holiday Classic (SCSBOA)
    - 1st Place (4A Class)
  - 2013 Tournament on the Turf (MBOS)
    - 2nd Place (Sapphire Class)
  - 2016 Valencia Field Tournament (SCSBOA)
    - 4th Place (4A Class)
  - 2017 Valencia Field Tournament (SCSBOA)
    - 2nd Place (4A Class)
  - 2022 St. George Regional (BOA)
    - 18th Place (3A Class)

== Feeder schools ==
- Aggie Roberts Elementary School (1999)
- Louis Wiener Junior Elementary School (1993)
- Charlotte Hill Elementary School (1990)
- Doris French Elementary School (1978)
- John R. Beatty Elementary School (2000)
- Roberta C. Cartwright Elementary School (1999)
- Roger D. Gehring Elementary School (2002)
- David M. Cox Elementary School (1990)
- Jack Lund Schofield Middle School (2000)
- Charles Silvestri Junior High School (1997)
- Barbera & Hank Greenspun Junior High School (1991)
