= Ben Jacobs (American football) =

American football player and coach (born 1988)

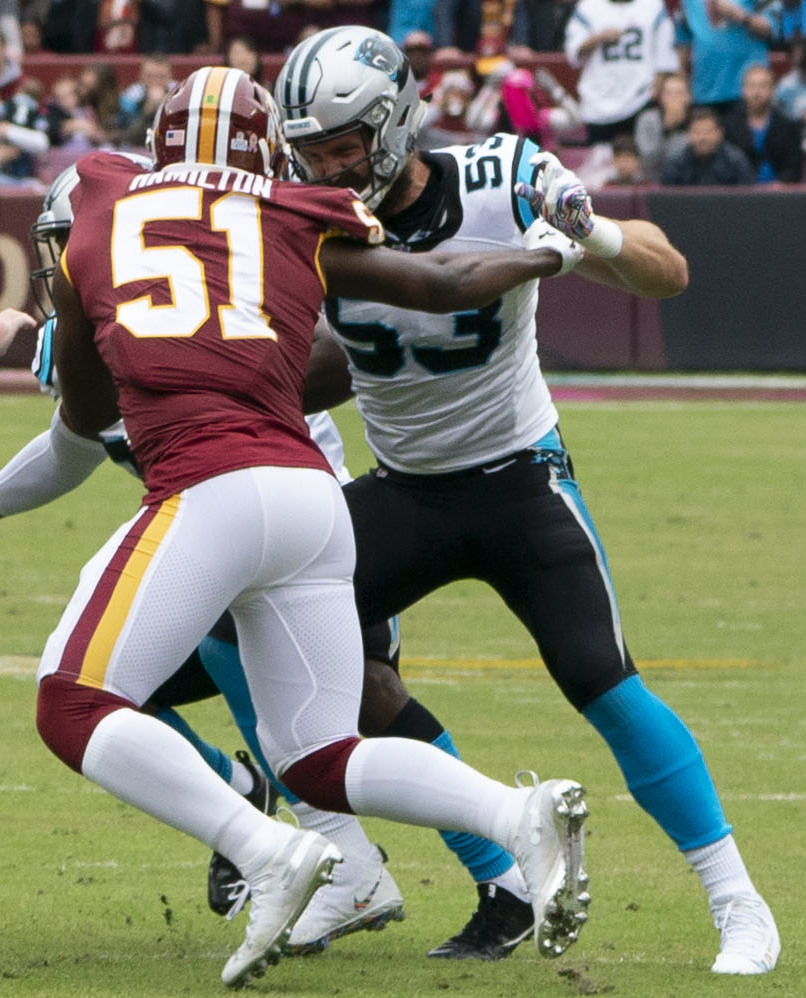
- Jacobs (right) with the Carolina Panthers in 2018

Cincinnati Bengals
- Title: Assistant special teams coach

Personal information
- Born: April 17, 1988 (age 38); Las Vegas, Nevada, U.S.
- Listed height: 6 ft 4 in (1.93 m)
- Listed weight: 240 lb (109 kg)

Career information
- Position: Linebacker (No. 54, 53)
- High school: Silverado (Las Vegas)
- College: Fresno State
- NFL draft: 2011: undrafted

Career history

Playing
- Cleveland Browns (2011–2012); Cincinnati Bengals (2012)*; Carolina Panthers (2013–2018)
- * Offseason or practice squad member only

Coaching
- Carolina Panthers (2019) Assistant special teams coach; Washington Football Team / Commanders (2020–2023) Assistant special teams coach; Cincinnati Bengals (2024–present) Assistant special teams coach

Career NFL statistics
- Total tackles: 36
- Pass deflections: 1
- Stats at Pro Football Reference

Benjamin Jacobs (born April 17, 1988) is an American football coach and former linebacker who is the assistant special teams coach for the Cincinnati Bengals of the National Football League (NFL). He was signed by the Cleveland Browns as an undrafted free agent in 2011. Jacobs played college football for the Fresno State Bulldogs, tying an NCAA record by forcing three fumbles in a single game.

== Professional career ==
Pre-draft measurables
Height	Weight	40-yard dash	10-yard split	20-yard split	20-yard shuttle	Three-cone drill	Vertical jump	Broad jump
6 ft 4 3/8 in (1.94 m)	243 lb (110 kg)	4.84 s	1.76 s	2.85 s	4.45 s	7.19 s	34.5 in (0.88 m)	9 ft 8 in (2.95 m)
All values from Pro Day

=== Cleveland Browns ===
Jacobs signed with the Cleveland Browns as an undrafted free agent on July 30, 2011. He was released during final roster cuts and on September 5, was re-signed to the Browns' practice squad. Jacobs was promoted to the active roster on November 29. He played in five games as a rookie but didn't register any stats. In 2012, Jacobs was once again waived by the Browns during roster cuts and was re-signed to the practice squad. He was released by the Browns on October 9, 2012.

=== Cincinnati Bengals ===
Jacobs was signed to the Cincinnati Bengals' practice squad on November 12, 2012. However, he was released by the Bengals on November 27.

=== Carolina Panthers ===
On May 13, 2013, Jacobs was signed by the Carolina Panthers. He was waived during final roster cuts on August 31, and was re-signed to the Panthers' practice squad. Jacobs was promoted to the active roster on October 5, but was released two days later and re-signed back to the practice squad, where he spent the rest of the season. In the 2014 season, Jacobs played in all 16 regular season games leading the team with nine special teams tackles and one on defense.

In the 2015 season, Jacobs played in 16 games recording seven tackles on defense and eight on special teams. He played in all three postseason games. On February 7, 2016, Jacobs was part of the Panthers team that played in Super Bowl 50. In the game, he recorded two special teams tackles, but the Panthers fell to the Denver Broncos by a score of 24–10.

On September 3, 2016, Jacobs was placed on injured reserve after suffering a quad injury in the preseason, but was released the following day. He was re-signed by the team on December 9.

On February 8, 2017, Jacobs signed a two-year contract with the Panthers.

=== Statistics ===
Year	Team	Games		Tackles					
Year	Team	GP	GS	Comb	Total	Ast	Sck	SFTY	TFL
2011	CLE	5	0	0	0	0	0	0	0
2013	CAR	0	0	0	0	0	0	0	0
2014	CAR	16	0	9	5	4	0	0	0
2015	CAR	16	0	15	9	6	0	0	0
2016	CAR	4	0	0	0	0	0	0	0
2017	CAR	16	0	6	4	2	0	0	0
2018	CAR	16	0	6	3	3	0	0	0
Career		73	0	36	21	15	0	0	1

== Coaching career ==
Having been a member of the Panthers for six seasons as a core special teamer, head coach Ron Rivera personally asked Jacobs if he would consider making the transition to coaching for the team, to which he agreed. He joined the Washington Football Team as an assistant special teams coach on January 15, 2020. Jacobs was named as the assistant special teams coach by the Cincinnati Bengals on February 27, 2024.
