= Matt Bush (baseball) =

American baseball pitcher (born 1986)

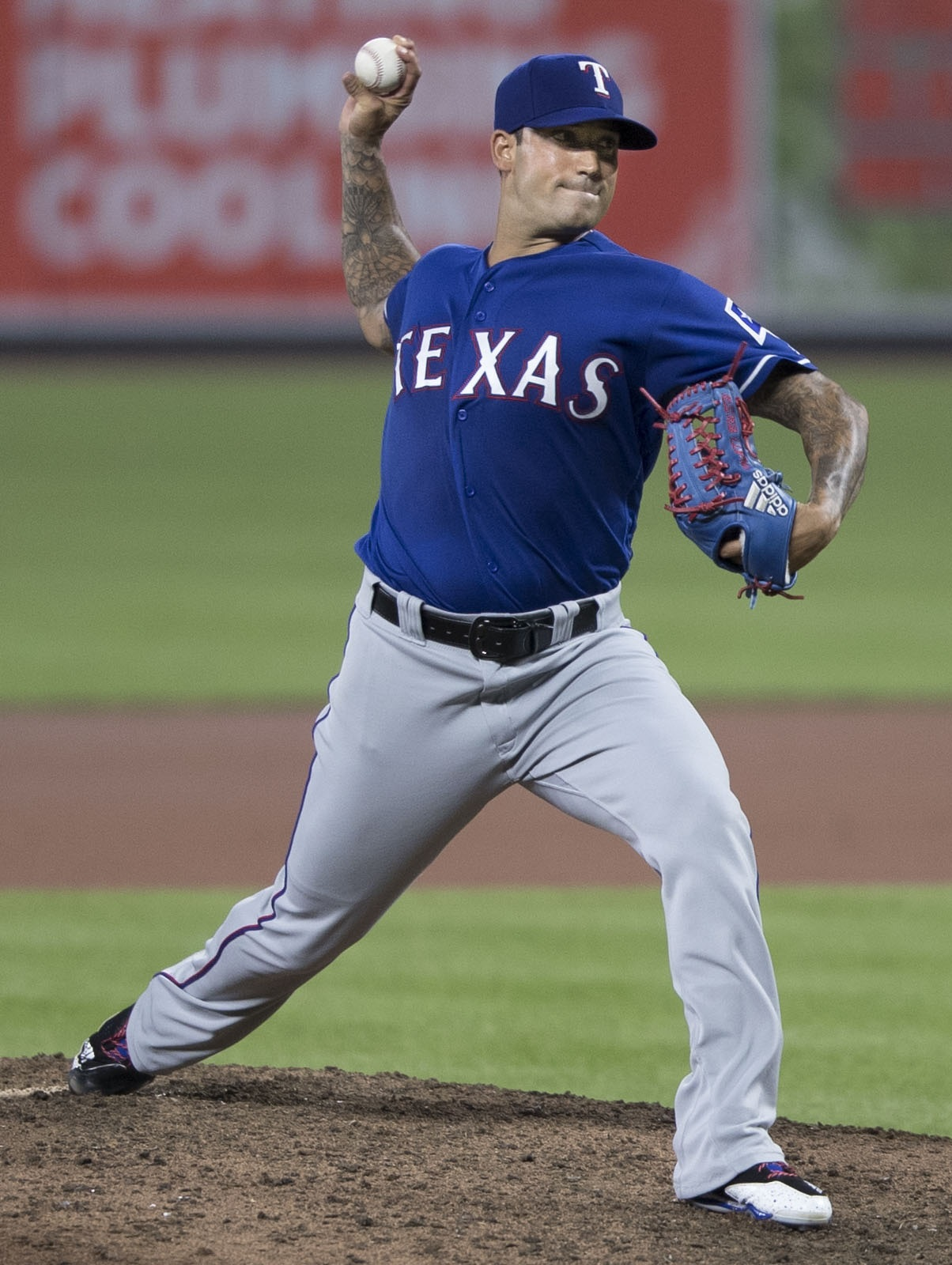
- Bush with the Texas Rangers in 2017
- Pitcher
- Born: February 8, 1986 (age 40); San Diego, California, U.S.
- Batted: Right Threw: Right

MLB debut
- May 13, 2016, for the Texas Rangers

Last MLB appearance
- June 30, 2023, for the Milwaukee Brewers

MLB statistics
- Win–loss record: 12–11
- Earned run average: 3.75
- Strikeouts: 227
- Stats at Baseball Reference

Teams
- Texas Rangers (2016–2018, 2021–2022); Milwaukee Brewers (2022–2023)

Matthew Brian Bush (born February 8, 1986) is an American former professional baseball pitcher. He has previously played in Major League Baseball (MLB) for the Texas Rangers and Milwaukee Brewers. He was drafted by the San Diego Padres with the first overall draft pick in the 2004 Major League Baseball draft. Despite being drafted first overall, due to numerous personal and legal problems, Bush did not make his MLB debut until he was 30 years old, in May 2016.

== Early life ==
Bush attended Mission Bay High School in San Diego, California. He played shortstop, where his defense and arm strength made him a top major league prospect. He had a .450 batting average with 11 home runs and 35 runs batted in (RBIs). He also pitched, and he threw a 94-mile-per-hour (151 km/h) fastball with a curveball. Bush had a 5–1 win–loss record with two saves and a 0.73 earned run average (ERA). Bush was considered one of the best five-tool players ever to come out of high school.

He also played soccer and ran track in high school.

== Professional career ==
=== Draft and minor leagues ===
The San Diego Padres selected Bush first overall in the 2004 Major League Baseball draft, originally as a shortstop. When he signed with the Padres, he received a signing bonus of $3.15 million, the second-largest signing bonus ever given to a Padres draft pick. As it turned out, Bush was actually the Padres' third choice, as they wanted one of two collegiate stars, Stephen Drew or Jered Weaver. However, both were represented by Scott Boras, who was known for demanding hefty bonuses for his clients. Padres owner John Moores was unwilling to meet those demands, so he selected Bush. Bush became the first shortstop drafted first overall from high school since the Seattle Mariners selected Alex Rodriguez in 1993.

Bush's professional career began with his suspension before he ever took the field, for his role in a fight outside an Arizona bar. Bush hit .192 in 99 at bats between the Rookie-level Arizona League and the short-season Northwest League. In the 2005 season, Bush hit .221 in 453 at bats for the Fort Wayne Wizards of the Single-A Midwest League. During spring training in 2006, he broke his ankle and missed half the season.

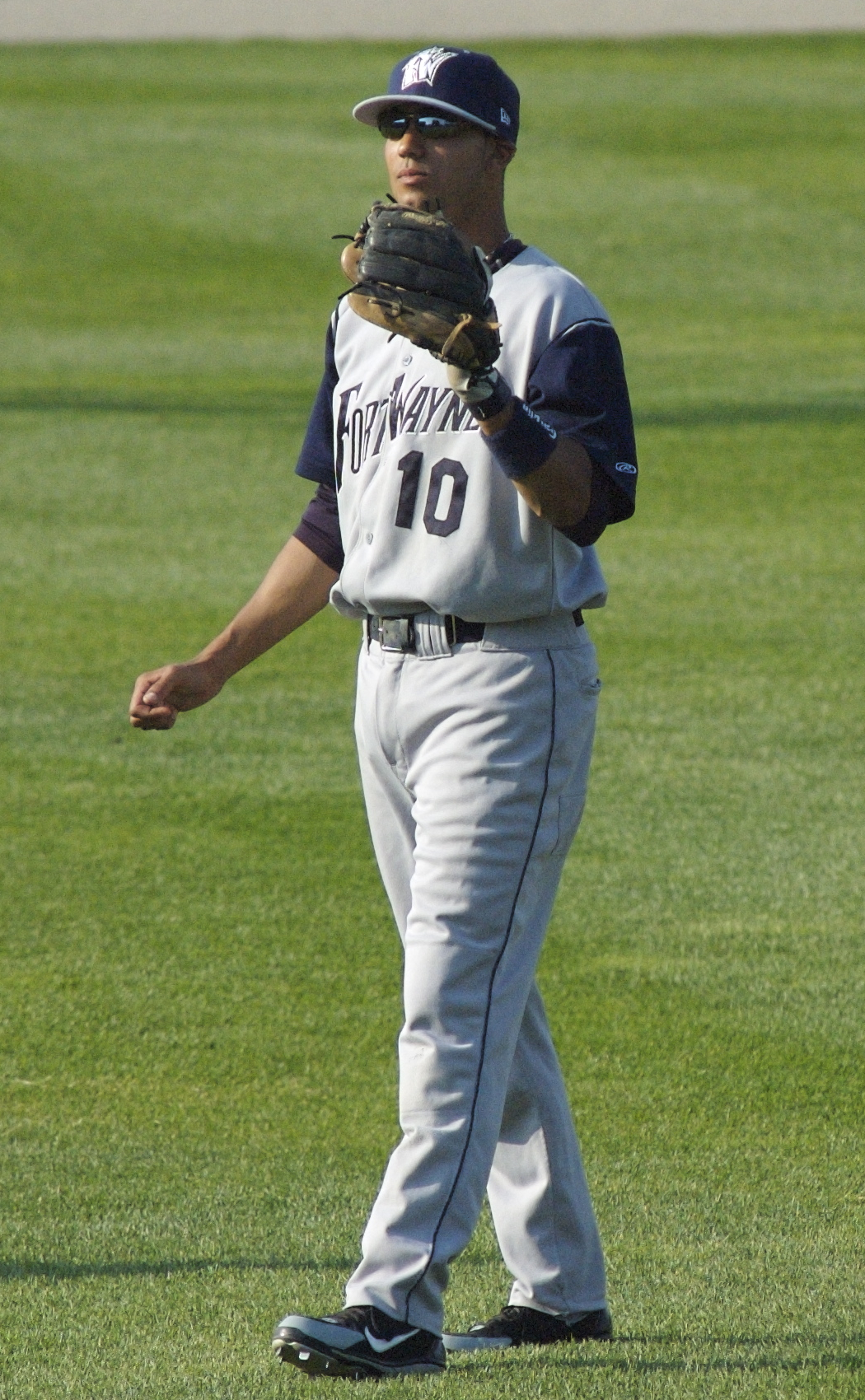
Bush with the Fort Wayne Wizards in 2006

Bush struggled again in 2007, hitting for a .583 OPS as of May 28. The Padres then converted Bush to a pitcher. His fastball reached a speed of 98 miles per hour (158 km/h), and he had prior knowledge of pitching from his days as a high school ace. After a promising start in rookie league, Bush tore a ligament in his pitching elbow in August 2007, ending his season. He had Tommy John surgery, sidelining him for 2008 as well. The Padres, however, placed Bush on the 40-man roster after the 2008 season to protect him from being selected in the Rule 5 draft.

Bush was designated for assignment on February 5, 2009, to make room on the 40-man roster for Cliff Floyd. Shortly afterward, it was learned that Bush was allegedly intoxicated in a high school parking lot where he assaulted two freshman lacrosse players. On February 10, Bush was traded to the Toronto Blue Jays for a player to be named later or cash considerations. The Blue Jays put him on a "zero tolerance" policy. At a party on March 30, he reportedly threw a baseball at a woman's head and banged on her car window after accusing her of drawing markings on his face at a party in Dunedin, Florida. The Blue Jays released him the next day. He was out of baseball for the entire 2009 season.

On January 28, 2010, Bush signed a minor league contract with the Tampa Bay Rays. He played one injury-plagued season for the Single-A Charlotte Stone Crabs in the Florida State League before being added to the Rays' 40-man roster in November. During the 2011 season, Bush played for the Rays' Double-A affiliate, the Montgomery Biscuits of the Southern League, primarily as a late reliever and occasional closer. He was promoted to the Rays' top affiliate, the Durham Bulls, in September, but never appeared during their playoff drive. Bush was slated to begin the 2012 season in Durham, but the Rays placed Bush on the restricted list after a drunken Bush ran over a 72-year-old man's head during spring training and was released shortly after the 2012 season ended. The victim in the crash, Tony Tufano, nearly died but was saved by his helmet, albeit with permanent injuries. Bush spent nearly three years in prison for the crime.

=== Texas Rangers (2016–2018, 2021–2022) ===
On December 18, 2015, the Texas Rangers signed Bush to a minor league contract, two months after his release from prison. He was signed after tryouts at a Golden Corral parking lot in Jacksonville, Florida (the only place Bush could work out; due to his post-release restrictions he could only travel to and from his Golden Corral job).

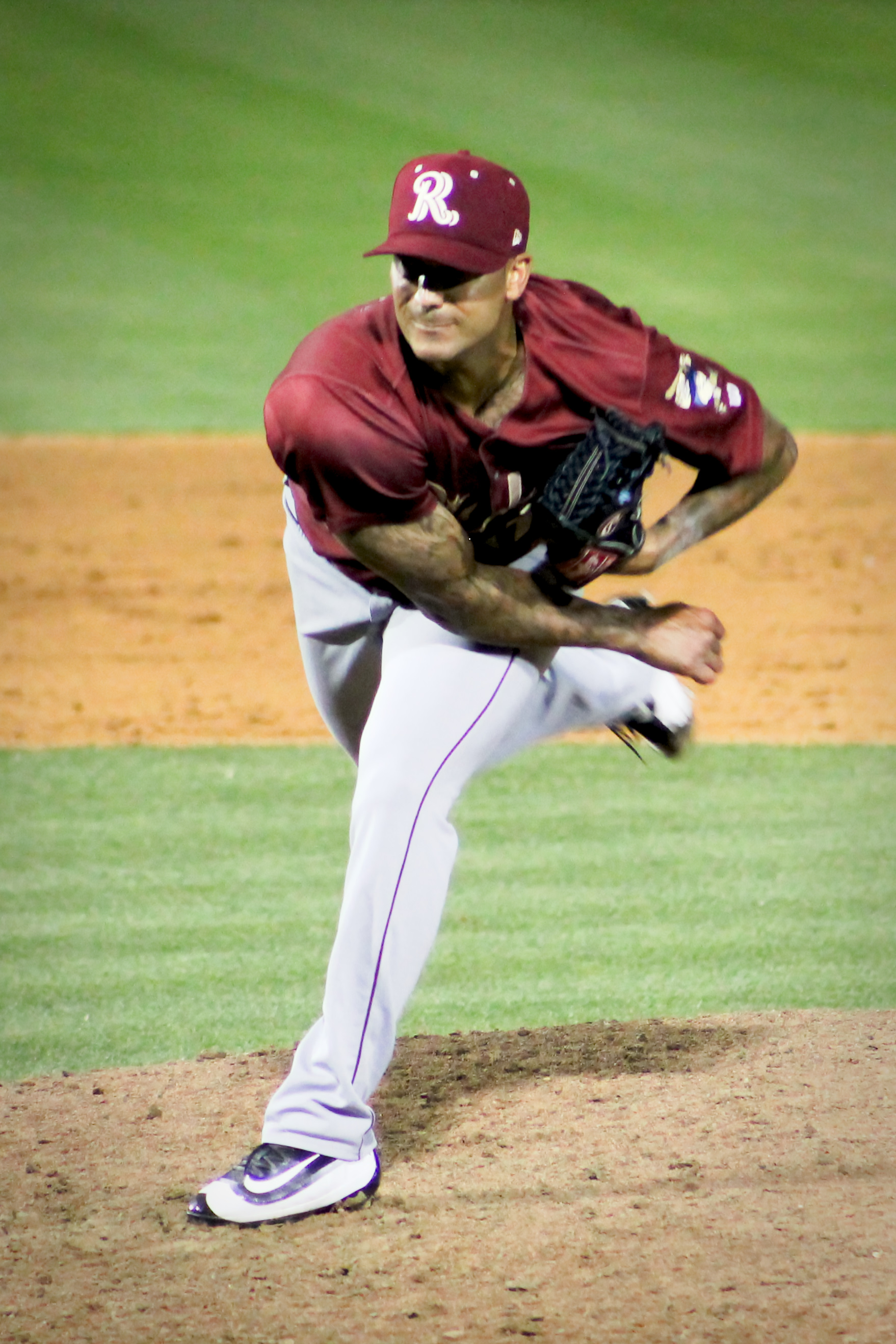
Bush pitching for the Frisco RoughRiders in 2016

The Rangers had experience with players struggling with substance abuse issues (notably Josh Hamilton, also a former #1 overall pick). Bush was placed on a zero-tolerance policy. His father, Danny, accompanied him to games and lived with him, paying out of his own pocket. On April 7, 2016, Bush threw his first professional pitch in almost five years for the Frisco RoughRiders of the Double-A Texas League, as he earned a save in one inning, while allowing one hit.

On May 13, 2016, Bush was called up to the major leagues by the Rangers. He worked the ninth inning against the Toronto Blue Jays that night, retiring the heart of the Jays lineup (Josh Donaldson, José Bautista, and Edwin Encarnación) by inducing a double-play off the bat of Edwin Encarnación after hitting José Bautista with a pitch. On May 15, Bush earned his first major league win in a 7–6 victory over the Toronto Blue Jays, a game more noted for the scuffle between Rougned Odor and José Bautista that would wind up in a bench-clearing brawl. Bush made 58 appearances out of the bullpen in 2016, finishing with a 7–2 record, a 2.48 ERA, and one save.

On April 12, 2017, it was revealed that Bush was diagnosed with AC joint soreness in his right shoulder. In 57 relief appearances for Texas in 2017, he was 3–4 with a 3.78 ERA and 58 strikeouts in 52 1/3 innings pitched.

Bush began 2018 with the Rangers. However, he was demoted to the Triple-A Round Rock Express on April 25 to work on his command as he had walked nine batters in 11 1/3 innings pitched along with posting a 1.50 WHIP.

Bush underwent surgery on his right elbow to fix a partial tear of his ulnar collateral ligament (UCL) in September 2018. The procedure was expected to keep him from game action until the second half of the 2019 season.

On December 17, 2018, Bush re-signed with the Texas Rangers on a minor-league contract, after being non-tendered earlier in the offseason. Bush opened the 2019 season on the injured list as he recovered from surgery. He was activated on June 8 and assigned to Frisco. On July 3, the Rangers announced that Bush suffered a torn UCL and would undergo a second Tommy John surgery, ending his 2019 season. He elected free agency on November 4. On December 16, 2019, he re-signed with Texas on a two-year minor league contract as he recovered from the surgery.

On April 1, 2021, Bush was selected to the 40-man roster. On April 12, 2021, it was announced that Bush would miss at least 12 weeks due to a flexor strain. He was placed on the 60-day injured list the next day. On November 5, 2021, Bush was outrighted off of the 40-man roster. On April 5, 2022, Bush had his contract selected to the major league roster.

=== Milwaukee Brewers (2022–2023) ===
On August 1, 2022, Bush was traded to the Milwaukee Brewers in exchange for infielder Mark Mathias and pitcher Antoine Kelly. On November 18, Bush signed a one-year, $1.85 million contract with the Brewers, avoiding arbitration.

In 2023, Bush made 12 appearances for Milwaukee, struggling to a 9.58 ERA with 10 strikeouts and 1 save across 10 1/3 innings of work. On July 1, 2023, Bush was designated for assignment by the Brewers. The removal of Bush from the roster came the night after he allowed a two–run, walk–off home run to Carlos Santana of the Pittsburgh Pirates. Bush was released by Milwaukee on July 3.

=== Texas Rangers (2023) ===
On July 12, 2023, Bush signed a minor league contract to return to the Texas Rangers organization. In 9 games for the Triple–A Round Rock Express, he posted a 2.13 ERA with 16 strikeouts and 2 saves in 12 2/3 innings pitched. On September 30, the Rangers selected Bush's contract, adding him to the major league roster.

== Legal issues ==
A few weeks after the Padres drafted him in 2004, Bush was arrested on suspicion of felony assault, misdemeanor trespass, disorderly conduct, and underage drinking, after he allegedly fought with security trying to escort him out of a bar.

In early 2009, Bush was allegedly involved in a drunken assault at a San Diego high school, which was caught on camera. According to witnesses, a drunken Bush beat up a high school lacrosse player with a golf club while screaming, "I'm Matt fucking Bush!," which was recorded on videotape. This led the Padres to designate Bush for assignment following the team's signing of Cliff Floyd, and then trade him to the Blue Jays. Only a month later, he assaulted and berated a woman at a party in Florida, and was released by the Blue Jays for violating a "zero tolerance" agreement.

On March 22, 2012, Bush was arrested and charged with two counts of DUI with property damage, one count of DUI with serious bodily injury, one count of leaving the scene of an accident with an injury, one count of driving with a suspended license, and 2 counts of leaving the scene of an accident with damage to property. In the incident, Bush hit 72-year-old motorcyclist Tony Tufano on the Tamiami Trail (U.S. Route 41) northbound in Port Charlotte, Florida, running over his head as he fled the scene in a Dodge Durango belonging to teammate Brandon Guyer. According to a witness, Tufano survived the incident because he was wearing a helmet. Bush was arrested in North Port, three miles down the road from the accident. He was on the road after getting kicked out of a nearby strip club for trying to climb on the stage. When he was arrested, Bush had a blood alcohol content of .18, more than double the legal limit in Florida. Bush spent the 2012 season housed at the Charlotte County Jail on $440,000 bail (reduced from an initial $1.015 million bond), and pleaded not guilty at his arraignment (via closed-circuit TV from the Charlotte County Jail) on May 21. Bush remains a suspect in two other hit and run accidents further north on the Tamiami Trail in Venice that occurred earlier that day. The following Sunday, Rays general manager Andrew Friedman announced that Bush would never play for the Rays organization again. The Rays placed Bush on the restricted list for the 2012 season, meaning that he was no longer on the 40-man roster, nor did he accumulate service time. He was officially released on October 6.

On December 18, 2012, Bush accepted a plea bargain and pleaded no contest to one count of DUI with great bodily injury. He was sentenced to 51 months in prison. As this was Bush's third DUI conviction in 10 years, he was banned from driving legally in Florida for 10 years after his release from prison. In the process, Bush turned down a deal that had less prison time (3 years), but with 7 years probation owing to past alcoholism issues. The Tufanos filed a $5 million civil suit against Bush, but settled in 2013 for a reported $200,000.

Bush was housed at the Mayo Correctional Institution in Mayo, Florida, as of January 2015. He was released from prison on October 30, 2015.

On October 4, 2024, Bush was arrested and charged with DWI, evading arrest, and a collision resulting in injury by the Arlington, Texas Police Department. Officers attempted to stop Bush after he was seen driving erratically. Bush evaded in his vehicle, and caused an accident. He then fled the scene on foot before being apprehended by bystanders. In late January 2025, Bush was arrested again for violating parole related to the DWI after he failed a required alcohol monitoring test which showed alcohol in his body. In early February 2026 he was sentenced to 10 years in prison with parole eligibility in 2030.
