= Mike Meyers (outfielder) =

American baseball player and scout (born 1993)

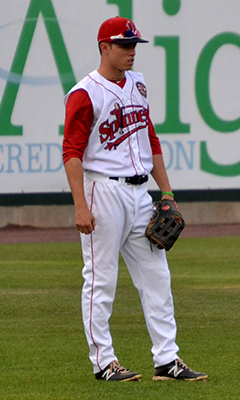
- Meyers with the Lowell Spinners in 2014
- Outfielder
- Born: December 28, 1993 (age 32); Las Vegas, Nevada, U.S.
- Bats: Right Throws: Right
- Stats at Baseball Reference

Michael Meyers (born December 28, 1993) is an American former professional baseball outfielder who currently serves as a scout for the Arizona Diamondbacks of Major League Baseball (MLB).

Meyers played shortstop for Silverado High School in Las Vegas, where he was voted to the 2012 Louisville Slugger Pre-Season High School First Team All-America team and 2012 First Team Nevada All-State. Meyers was drafted in the 12th round of the 2012 Major League Baseball draft by the Boston Red Sox.

His 9 triples in 2014 led the New York-Penn League, and set a new Lowell Spinners record. In July 2015, he was Red Sox Minor League Base Runner of the Month.

Meyers played center field for Israel at the 2017 World Baseball Classic qualifier in September 2016, and played for Team Israel at the 2017 World Baseball Classic in the main tournament.

== Early and personal life ==
Meyers was born in Las Vegas, Nevada, and is Jewish. Both of his parents are teachers.

== High school ==
He attended Silverado High School in Las Vegas, where Meyers played shortstop for the baseball team. In 2010, he was voted First Team All Southeast League. In 2011, he was voted First Team Class 4-A All-Southern Nevada. In 2012, he was voted to the 2012 Louisville Slugger Pre-Season High School First Team All-America team, and was voted 2012 First Team Nevada All-State. He holds the high school's career (192) and single-season (59) records for runs scored, and its career records in doubles (50), triples (18), and steals (31).

== Professional career ==
Meyers was drafted in the 12th round of the 2012 Major League Baseball draft as a middle infielder. The Red Sox agree to pay him a large amount of money to attend school when he was finished with his baseball career.

He began his professional career in 2012 at the age of 18 with the Gulf Coast Red Sox of the Rookie Gulf Coast League, batting .337 in 30 games while playing second base and shortstop. In August 2012, Meyers led the Gulf Coast League with a .443 batting average. In 2013, Meyers moved to the outfield and played for both the GCL Red Sox and the Lowell Spinners of the Low-A New York-Penn League, but appeared in only 28 games due to injuries.

In 2014, Meyers again played for the Lowell Spinners. His 9 triples led the NY-Penn League, and set a new Lowell Spinners record. In August 2014 he was Gulf Coast League Player of the Month. That same month, on August 25, he hit three triples in one game—a rare feat that has taken place only 15 times in major league history since the start of World War II.

In 2015, Meyers played for the Greenville Drive of the Single-A South Atlantic League, and for the Salem Red Sox of the High-A Carolina League, and stole 14 bases in 16 attempts. He batted .296 for Greenville, tied for 6th in the South Atlantic League. In July 2015, he was Red Sox Minor League Base Runner of the Month.

In 2016, at 22 years of age, Meyers played the entire season with Salem. He batted .272 and hit nine triples (2nd in the Carolina League), had nine sacrifice hits (2nd in the league), stole 26 bases (tied for 8th in the league) in 31 attempts, and had 66 RBI (tied for 9th in the league).

Meyers split 2017 between Salem and the Portland Sea Dogs of the Double-A Eastern League, batting a combined .248 with eight stolen bases in 326 at-bats. On January 5, 2018, Meyers was released by the Red Sox organization, and became a free agent.

== Team Israel ==
Meyers played for Israel at the qualifier for the 2017 World Baseball Classic in September 2016. In the opening game, Meyers as the starting center fielder and batting ninth was 0-for-2 with a strikeout; however he was credited with an RBI on a sacrifice fly. Meyers in the second game again started in center field and batted ninth, going 0-for-2 with a walk and a strikeout. Blake Gailen took over as the starting center fielder in the third and final game, though Meyers replaced him defensively in the late innings, but did not have an at bat.

Meyers also played for Team Israel at the 2017 World Baseball Classic in the main tournament, in March 2017. In his debut, he pinch ran for Ike Davis in the 10th inning, and scored what would turn out to be the winning run against South Korea.

== Coaching career ==
In January 2019, Meyers became a scout for the Arizona Diamondbacks.
