= A. J. Jiménez =

Puerto Rican baseball player (born 1990)

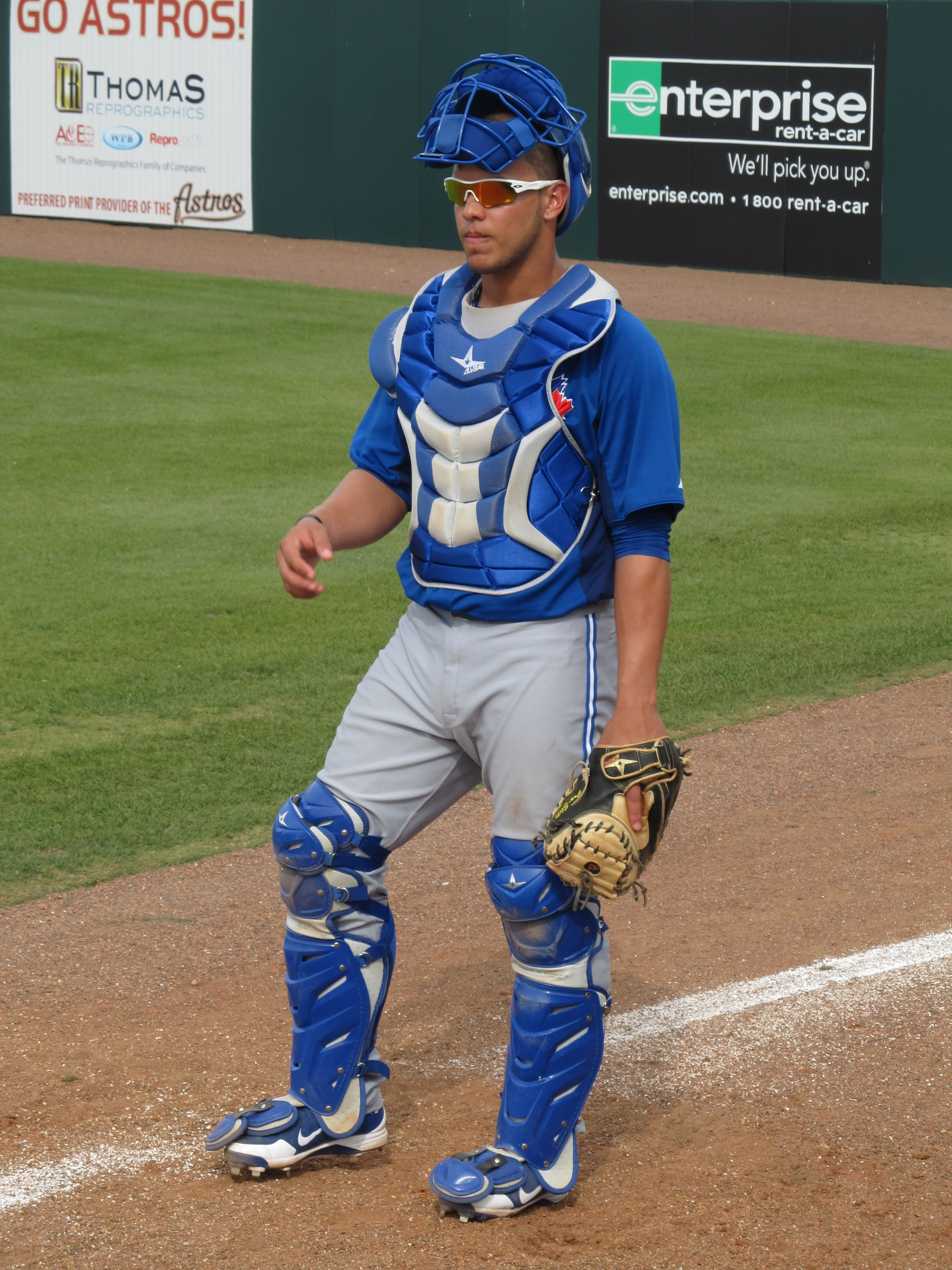
- Jiménez with the Toronto Blue Jays in 2012
- Catcher
- Born: May 1, 1990 (age 35); San Juan, Puerto Rico
- Batted: Right Threw: Right

MLB debut
- September 6, 2017, for the Texas Rangers

Last MLB appearance
- October 1, 2017, for the Texas Rangers

MLB statistics
- Batting average: .083
- Home runs: 0
- Runs batted in: 0
- Stats at Baseball Reference

Teams
- Texas Rangers (2017)

Antonio Jamil Jiménez (born May 1, 1990) is a Puerto Rican former professional baseball catcher, who played in Major League Baseball (MLB) for the Texas Rangers.

== Career ==
=== Toronto Blue Jays ===
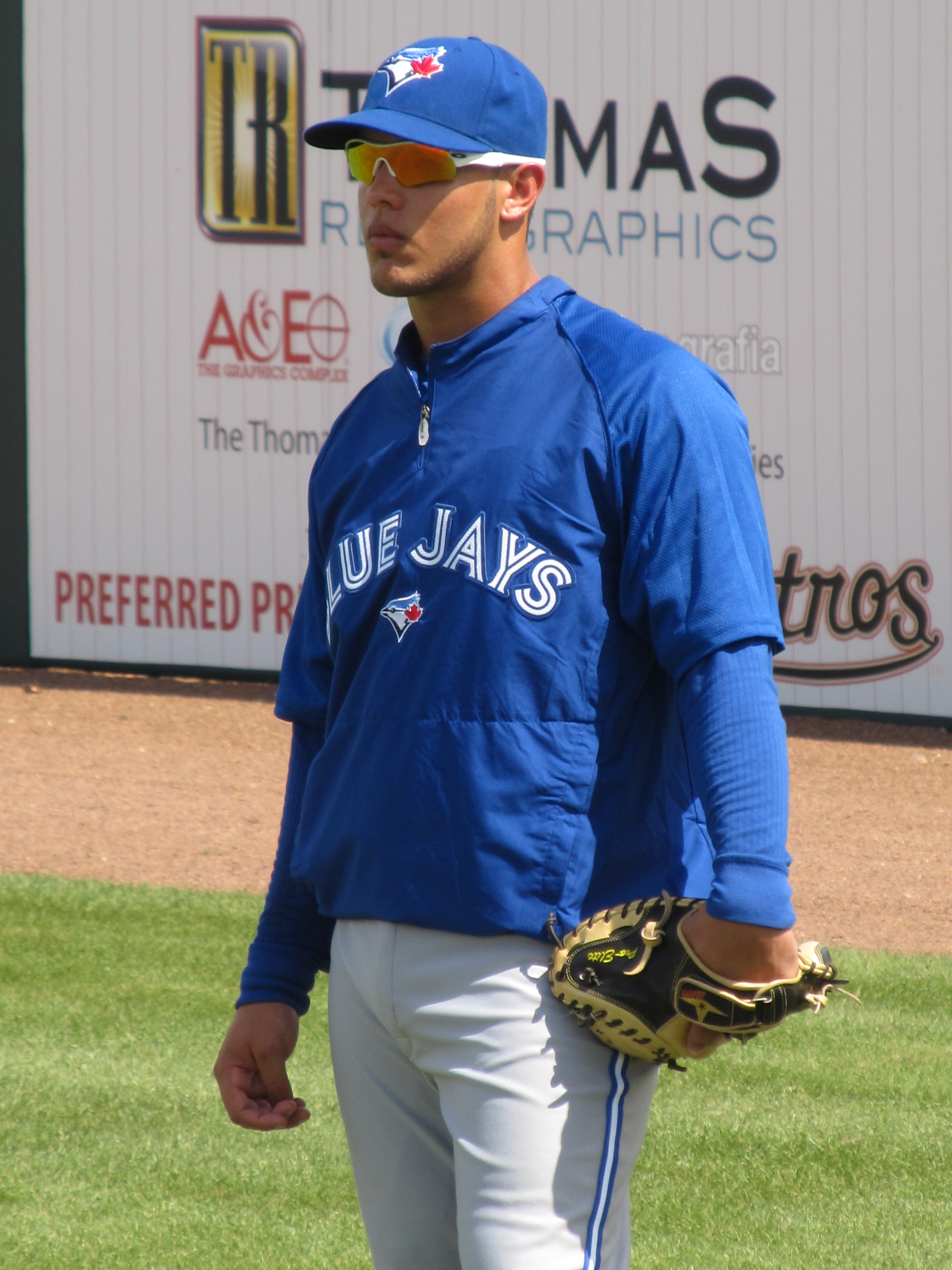
Jiménez with the Toronto Blue Jays in 2012 spring training

Jiménez was drafted by the Toronto Blue Jays in the 9th round of the 2008 Major League Baseball draft. After signing with the team, he was assigned to the Gulf Coast League Blue Jays and played in 19 games during the 2008 season, batting .191 with five RBI. In 2009, Jiménez was promoted to the Class-A Lansing Lugnuts and recorded a batting average of .263, in addition to hitting three home runs and 31 RBI. Jiménez played for Lansing, as well as the High-A Dunedin Blue Jays in the 2010 season, hitting a combined .299 with five home runs and 55 RBI over 72 games. His entire 2011 season was played with Dunedin, where he hit .303 with four home runs and 52 RBI in 102 games played.

Jiménez was promoted to the Double-A New Hampshire Fisher Cats in 2012 but played only 27 games that season, hitting .257, before undergoing Tommy John surgery on his right elbow. He was added to the Blue Jays' 40-man roster on November 20, 2012. In 2013, Jiménez played for Dunedin initially, batting .429 in nine games, before being promoted to New Hampshire. In 50 games with the Fisher Cats, he batted .276 with three home runs and 29 RBI. Jiménez was selected to appear in the 2013 All-Star Futures Game, and was promoted to the Triple-A Buffalo Bisons on August 17, 2013. He batted .233 in eight games with the Bisons in 2013. While it was believed that he would be called up to Toronto for the September roster expansion, irritation in his surgically-repaired right elbow ruled him out for the rest of the season. Jiménez started the 2014 campaign with the Fisher Cats, and was promoted to the Bisons on May 26. He was placed on the disabled list on August 5, and activated on August 27.

Jiménez was optioned to the Buffalo Bisons on March 18, 2015. He was assigned to New Hampshire on April 16, and brought back up to Buffalo on April 23. In June he underwent left wrist surgery. Jiménez remained on the disabled list through the end of the season. He played in just 28 games in 2015, batting .194 with nine RBI. On March 28, 2016, Jiménez was designated for assignment by the Blue Jays to make room on the 40-man roster for Jesús Montero. He cleared waivers, and was outrighted to Triple-A Buffalo on April 7. Jiménez played 67 games with Buffalo in 2016, and hit .241 with four home runs and 28 RBI. On November 7, 2016, Jiménez was added to the 40-man roster. He was designated for assignment on February 9, 2017, and released on February 13.

=== Texas Rangers ===
On February 17, 2017, Jiménez signed a minor league contract with the Texas Rangers organization and was invited to Major League spring training. He was called up when major league rosters expanded on September 1, and outrighted to Triple-A on November 6, 2017. He elected free agency the same day.

=== Road Warriors ===
On April 13, 2018, Jiménez signed with the Road Warriors of the Atlantic League of Professional Baseball.

== Personal life ==
A.J. is the older brother of pitcher Joe Jiménez.
