= Brett Nicholas =

American baseball player (born 1988)

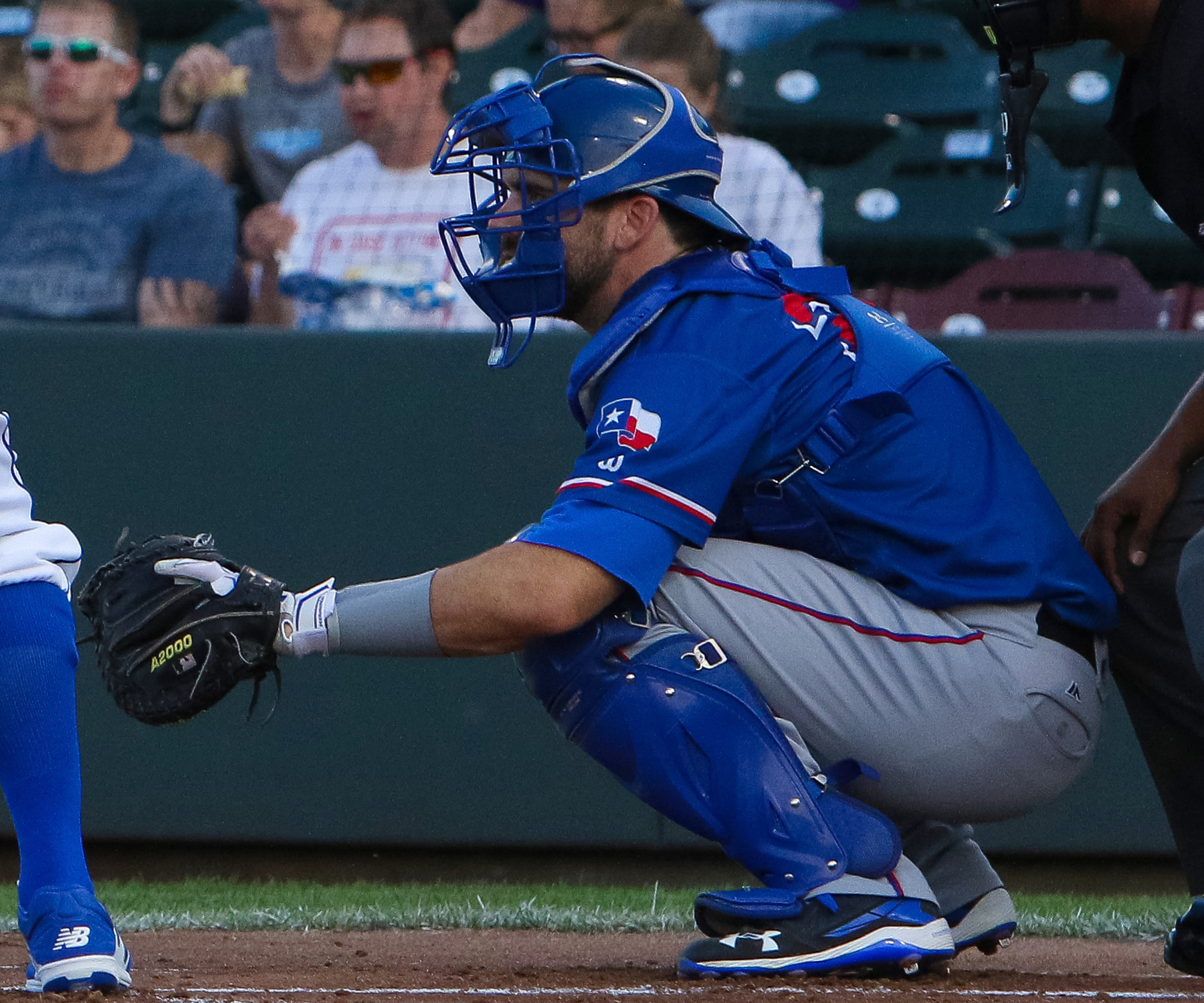
- Nicholas playing for the Round Rock Express in 2016
- Catcher
- Born: July 18, 1988 (age 38); Phoenix, Arizona, U.S.
- Batted: Left Threw: Right

MLB debut
- April 11, 2016, for the Texas Rangers

Last MLB appearance
- October 1, 2017, for the Texas Rangers

MLB statistics
- Batting average: .252
- Home runs: 4
- Runs batted in: 15
- Stats at Baseball Reference

Teams
- Texas Rangers (2016–2017)

Brett James Nicholas (born July 18, 1988) is an American former professional baseball catcher. He played in Major League Baseball (MLB) for the Texas Rangers.

== Career ==
Nicholas was born in Phoenix, Arizona and attended Pinnacle High School in Phoenix. In 2008, he attended Gonzaga University, in 2009 he went to Scottsdale Community College and in 2010, he attended University of Missouri. He slashed .378/.483/.617 with nine home runs and 49 RBI for Scottsdale Community College in 2009 and in 2010, he hit .351/.434/.592 with 12 home runs and 64 RBI. He was drafted in the sixth round of the 2010 Major League Baseball draft, one pick after pitcher Logan Darnell, and began his professional career that year.

=== Texas Rangers ===
He played for the Arizona League Rangers and Spokane Indians in 2010 and Spokane and the Myrtle Beach Pelicans in 2012. In 2013, he batted .285/.351/.413 with eight home runs, 63 RBI and 33 doubles in 122 games for Myrtle Beach, earning a selection to play in the Arizona Fall League. In 2013, he was a Texas League Mid- and Post-Season All-Star, a MiLB.com Organization All-Star, an AFL Rising Star, and the Rising Stars MVP after hitting .289/.357/.474 with 21 home runs and 91 RBI for the Frisco RoughRiders during the regular season and .230/.266/.393 in 17 games for the Surprise Saguaros during the AFL campaign. He hit two home runs during the Fall Stars Game.

He reached Triple-A for the first time in 2014, hitting .274/.322/.389 with 10 home runs and 58 RBI in 127 games for the Express. Back with Round Rock in 2015, Nicholas batted .268/.314/.412 with 12 home runs and 63 RBI.

He has earned stints in major league spring training each year since 2012.

He was promoted to the major leagues for the first time on April 10, 2016, after catcher Robinson Chirinos was placed on the disabled list. He started his first career game a day later against Seattle. He picked up his first two career hits in four at bats and also threw out Nori Aoki at second base in the first inning in a 7-3 win.

On July 26, 2017, Nicholas pitched for the Texas Rangers in the ninth inning of a game against the Miami Marlins. He allowed four earned runs, giving him an ERA of 36.00. The Rangers designated him for assignment on March 7, 2018.

=== San Diego Padres ===
On April 6, 2018, Nicholas was traded to the San Diego Padres for a PTBNL; who would become Emmanuel Clase. He played in 117 games for the Triple–A El Paso Chihuahuas, hitting .291/.353/.485 with 16 home runs and 83 RBI. Nicholas elected free agency following the season on November 2.

=== Colorado Rockies ===
On November 9, 2018, Nicholas signed a minor league contract with the Colorado Rockies. On March 23, 2019, he requested and received his release from the Rockies.

=== Chicago White Sox ===
On April 4, 2019, Nicholas signed a minor league contract with the Chicago White Sox.

== Post-playing career ==
On May 5, 2019, Nicholas announced his retirement from baseball.

As of 2026, Brett works in real estate in Phoenix, AZ.
