= Nick Gardewine =

American baseball player (born 1993)

Free agent
- Relief pitcher
- Born: August 15, 1993 (age 32); Effingham, Illinois, U.S.
- Bats: Right Throws: Right

MLB debut
- August 22, 2017, for the Texas Rangers

MLB statistics (through 2018 season)
- Win–loss record: 0-0
- Earned run average: 4.85
- Strikeouts: 7
- Stats at Baseball Reference

Teams
- Texas Rangers (2017–2018)

Nick Gardewine (born August 15, 1993) is an American professional baseball pitcher who is a free agent. He has previously played in Major League Baseball (MLB) for the Texas Rangers.

== Amateur career ==
Gardewine attended Effingham High School in Effingham, Illinois, and graduated in 2012. He played for the school's baseball team as a pitcher and finished his senior year with an 8–1 win–loss record, a 0.76 earned run average (ERA), and 74 strikeouts in 55 innings pitched. He then enrolled at Kaskaskia College and pitched for the school's baseball team in the National Junior College Athletic Association for one season. He had a 2.12 ERA, and threw a no-hitter in a game against Lake Land College, helping his team reach the JUCO World Series.

== Professional career ==
=== Texas Rangers ===
The Texas Rangers selected Gardewine in the seventh round, with the 220th overall selection, of the 2013 Major League Baseball draft. He signed with the Rangers, and pitched in Minor League Baseball for the Arizona League Rangers of the Rookie-level Arizona League in 2013 where he was 3–3 with 3.21 ERA with 37 strikeouts in 14 games. In 2014, Gardewine pitched for the Spokane Indians of the Low-A Northwest League, and had a 6–3 win–loss record and a 4.54 ERA with 60 strikeouts. He played for the Hickory Crawdads of the Single-A South Atlantic League in 2015, and had a 6–8 win–loss record and a 4.31 ERA with 80 strikeouts. While pitching for Hickory, Gardewine tore his supraspinatus muscle. He rehabilitated the injury into the 2016 season, where he became a relief pitcher for the High Desert Mavericks of the High-A California League. In 29 relief appearances for Hickory in 2016, he posted 5–1 record and 2.47 ERA with 60 strikeouts across 54 2/3 innings pitched. Gardewine began the 2017 season with the Frisco RoughRiders of the Double-A Texas League.

On August 21, 2017, Gardewine was selected to the 40-man roster and promoted to the major leagues for the first time. Gardewine appeared in 12 games for Texas in 2017, producing a 5.63 ERA with three strikeouts over eight innings of work.

In 2018 Gardewine appeared in three games for Texas, recording a 3.60 ERA with four strikeouts across 5 innings. He appeared in 12 games for the Round Rock Express of the Triple-A Pacific Coast League, throwing 12 innings with a 2–1 record, 7.30 ERA, and 17 strikeouts in 12 games. Gardewine was placed on the Triple-A disabled list on May 17, 2018, with a right forearm strain. Gardewine spent the rest of the 2018 season rehabbing his injury and did not appear in another game. He was subsequently transferred to the 60-day injured list on August 25.

In 2019, Gardewine was optioned to the Nashville Sounds of the Triple-A Pacific Coast League to open the season, and appeared in four games before being shut down for the season due to injuries. On June 8, he was designated for assignment by the Rangers. On June 13, Gardewine was released by Texas. However, on June 19, he re-signed with the Rangers organization on a two-year minor league contract.

Gardewine did not pitch for the organization in 2020 due to the cancellation of the minor league season because of the COVID-19 pandemic. Gardewine was released by the Rangers on June 1, 2020.

=== Cleburne Railroaders ===
On May 7, 2021, Gardewine signed with the Cleburne Railroaders of the American Association of Professional Baseball. Gardewine appeared in one game with Cleburne, tossing a shutout inning with three strikeouts.

=== Arizona Diamondbacks ===
On May 20, 2021, Gardewine’s contract was purchased by the Arizona Diamondbacks organization. He made six appearances split between the rookie-level Arizona Complex League Diamondbacks and Triple-A Reno Aces, recording a 6.35 ERA with 10 strikeouts across 5 2/3 innings pitched. Gardewine was released by the Diamondbacks organization on July 29.

=== Cleburne Railroaders (second stint) ===
On April 29, 2022, Gardewine signed with the Cleburne Railroaders of the American Association of Professional Baseball. Gardewine appeared in 42 games for Cleburne in 2022, recording a 5-4 record and 2.72 ERA with 15 saves and 59 strikeouts in 43 innings pitched.

On January 23, 2023, he was released by the Railroaders. Gardewine re–signed with Cleburne on June 17. He made 24 appearances for the Railroaders, struggling to a 6.17 ERA with 24 strikeouts and 5 saves across 23 1/3 innings pitched. Gardewine became a free agent after the 2023 season.

=== Hagerstown Flying Boxcars ===
On May 29, 2024, Gardewine signed with the Hagerstown Flying Boxcars of the Atlantic League of Professional Baseball. In 9 games for Hagerstown, Gardewine struggled to a 6.17 ERA with 13 strikeouts across 11 2/3 innings pitched.

=== Lexington Legends ===
On June 28, 2024, Gardewine was traded to the Lexington Legends of the Atlantic League of Professional Baseball. In 21 games for the Legends, he recorded an 0.90 ERA with 25 strikeouts and nine saves over 20 innings of relief.

=== Dorados de Chihuahua ===
On October 23, 2024, Gardewine signed with the Dorados de Chihuahua of the Mexican League. In 13 appearances for Chihuahua in 2025, he struggled to a 1-1 record and 11.81 ERA with nine strikeouts and two saves across 10 2/3 innings pitched.

=== El Águila de Veracruz ===
On June 20, 2025, Gardewine was traded to El Águila de Veracruz of the Mexican League. In 16 relief appearances, he went 2–0 with a 2.25 ERA, 14 strikeouts, and one save across 16 innings pitched.

Gardewine made eight appearances for Veracruz in 2026, and struggled to a 19.50 ERA, with only one strikeout and five walks across six innings pitched. On May 20, 2026, Gardewine was released by Veracruz.

=== Guerreros de Oaxaca ===
On June 7, 2026, Gardewine signed with the Guerreros de Oaxaca of the Mexican League. In seven relief appearances, he registered a 6.75 ERA, struck out five, and walked two batters across 5 1/3 innings pitched. On July 1, 2026, Gardewine was released by Oaxaca.
