= Drew Robinson =

American baseball player (born 1992)

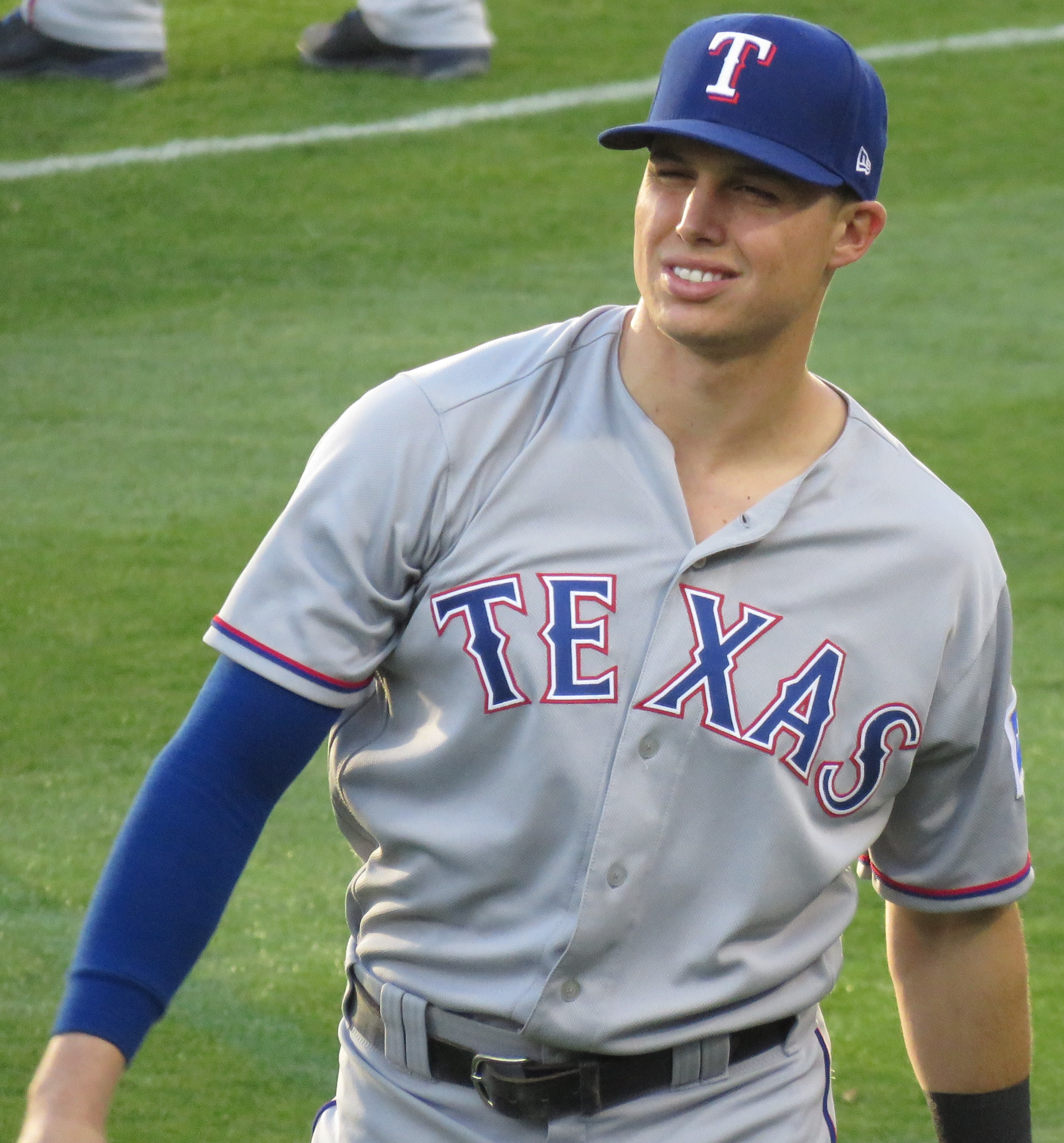
- Robinson with the Texas Rangers in 2017
- Utility player
- Born: April 20, 1992 (age 34); Las Vegas, Nevada, U.S.
- Batted: Left Threw: Right

MLB debut
- April 5, 2017, for the Texas Rangers

Last MLB appearance
- April 22, 2019, for the St. Louis Cardinals

MLB statistics
- Batting average: .202
- Home runs: 9
- Runs batted in: 22
- Stats at Baseball Reference

Teams
- Texas Rangers (2017–2018); St. Louis Cardinals (2019)

Drew Elliott Robinson (born April 20, 1992) is an American former professional baseball utility player. He played in Major League Baseball (MLB) for the Texas Rangers and St. Louis Cardinals.

== Career ==
=== Texas Rangers ===
Robinson was drafted by the Texas Rangers in the fourth round, 136th overall, of the 2010 Major League Baseball draft. He made his professional debut with the Arizona League Rangers that year. With the AZL Rangers, Robinson batted .286 with a .406 on-base percentage in 44 games. He split 2011 between the AZL Rangers and the Low-A Spokane Indians, hitting a combined .200 with four home runs and 30 runs batted in (RBI) in 51 games. For the Single-A Hickory Crawdads in 2012, Robinson batted .273 with a .409 on-base mark, hitting 13 home runs with 67 RBI, 10 steals, and 86 walks in 123 games. He won his first Player of the Week honor that year.

In 2013, Robinson batted .257 with eight home runs, 70 RBI and 10 stolen bases in 122 games for the High-A Myrtle Beach Pelicans, earning another Player of the Week honor. With the Double-A Frisco RoughRiders and Triple-A Round Rock Express in 2014, Robinson batted .198 with 12 home runs and 45 RBI in 96 games; in his first taste of Triple-A, he slashed .304/.467/.522 with one home run and five RBI in eight games. Robinson played for the RoughRiders and Express again in 2015, batting .235 with 21 home runs, 66 RBI, 16 stolen bases, and 87 walks between them; again he performed well at Triple-A, batting .304 in 23 at-bats. He led the Texas League in home runs that year. He was a MiLB.com Organization All-Star in 2015 and earned another Player of the Week. In the offseason, he played for the Indios de Mayaguez in Puerto Rico. Going into 2016, Baseball America named him the #30 prospect in the Rangers system. He returned to Round Rock in 2016, for whom he batted .257/.350/.480 with 17 stolen bases.

Robinson made the Rangers' Opening Day roster in 2017. He made his major league debut on April 5 as a replacement for Delino DeShields Jr. at designated hitter in a game against the Cleveland Indians, and went 0-for-2. On June 25, Robinson collected his first major league hit, a home run, off of Michael Pineda in a 7–6 Rangers victory over the New York Yankees at Yankee Stadium. He finished his rookie season with a .224/.314/.439 with 6 home runs and 13 RBI in 48 games. With Texas in 2018, Robinson slashed .183/.288/.294 with 3 home runs and 9 RBI in 109 at bats, while with Round Rock he slashed .303/.379/.569 in 211 at-bats with 10 home runs.

=== St. Louis Cardinals ===
On December 11, 2018, the Rangers traded Robinson to the St. Louis Cardinals in exchange for Patrick Wisdom. Robinson made St. Louis' 25-man roster to begin the 2019 season, but was optioned to the Triple-A Memphis Redbirds and recalled twice during the season, totaling seven at-bats with St. Louis for the year. With Memphis, he slashed .265/.385/.423 with six home runs and 10 stolen bases in 189 at-bats. In June, while with Memphis, Robinson was placed on the injured list, and subsequently underwent Tommy John surgery on his left elbow, ending his season. On August 28, 2019, Robinson was released by St. Louis.

=== San Francisco Giants ===
On October 10, 2019, Robinson signed a minor league contract with the San Francisco Giants organization. Robinson did not play in a game in 2020 due to the cancellation of the minor league season because of the COVID-19 pandemic. Robinson re-signed with the Giants on a new minor league contract on November 2, 2020.

Robinson opened the 2021 season with the Triple-A Sacramento River Cats, and batted .115/.225/.240 with 3 home runs and 8 RBI in 38 games with the team. On July 16, 2021, Robinson announced that he would transition into a role as a mental health advocate in the Giants' organization, retiring as a player following the team's weekend series against the Round Rock Express.

Overall in the major leagues, Robinson played 28 games in center field, 24 games in left field, 23 games at third base, 15 games at second base, 7 games at shortstop, and 2 games in right field.

== Personal life ==
Robinson was born in Las Vegas, Nevada, and attended Silverado High School.

His older brother, Chad, was drafted by the Milwaukee Brewers in 2006 as a pitcher, and played professionally for eight seasons.

On April 16, 2020, Robinson survived a suicide attempt with a handgun, resulting in the loss of his sense of smell and taste, and his right eye. His story was shared on ESPN+ titled "Alive: The Drew Robinson Story". Afterward, he began using his platform and experiences to speak out about the importance of mental health.
