= Austin Bibens-Dirkx =

American baseball player (born 1985)

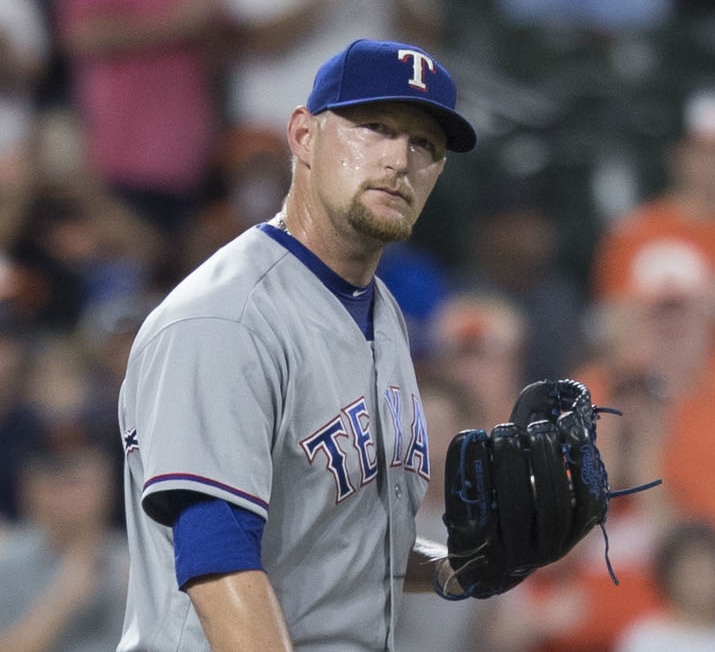
- Bibens-Dirkx with the Texas Rangers
- Pitcher
- Born: April 29, 1985 (age 41); Salem, Oregon, U.S.
- Batted: Right Threw: Right

Professional debut
- MLB: May 17, 2017, for the Texas Rangers
- CPBL: March 28, 2019, for the Uni-President Lions

Last appearance
- MLB: September 12, 2018, for the Texas Rangers
- CPBL: June 8, 2019, for the Uni-President Lions

MLB statistics
- Win–loss record: 7–5
- Earned run average: 5.27
- Strikeouts: 71

CPBL statistics
- Win–loss record: 2–5
- Earned run average: 5.28
- Strikeouts: 37
- Stats at Baseball Reference

Teams
- Texas Rangers (2017–2018); Uni-President Lions (2019)

Austin Mitchell Bibens-Dirkx (born April 29, 1985) is an American former professional baseball pitcher and current coach. He played in Major League Baseball (MLB) for the Texas Rangers and for the Uni-President Lions of the Chinese Professional Baseball League (CPBL).

== Amateur career ==
Bibens-Dirkx attended McNary High School in Keizer, Oregon, Chemeketa Community College, and later the University of Portland.

== Professional career ==
=== Seattle Mariners ===
The Seattle Mariners drafted Bibens-Dirkx in the 16th round of the 2006 Major League Baseball draft. He began his professional career that summer, splitting time between the short season Everett AquaSox, the Class-A Wisconsin Timber Rattlers, and the Triple-A Tacoma Rainiers. He went a combined 2–2 with a 1.64 ERA and five saves in 38 1/3 innings pitched. In 2007, Bibens-Dirkx played for the Class-A Advanced High Desert Mavericks of the California League. He went 3–1 with a 4.42 ERA, 26 strikeouts and eight saves. Bibens-Dirkx split the 2008 season between High Desert and the Rookie-level Peoria Mariners. He was placed on the disabled list twice and made rehab starts in Peoria. He went a combined 3–1 with a 7.06 ERA in 38 games. The Mariners released him on April 3, 2009.

=== Victoria Seals ===
In 2009, Bibens-Dirkx played for the Victoria Seals of the Golden Baseball League.

=== Chicago Cubs ===
The Chicago Cubs purchased his contract partway into the season. He was then assigned to the Class-A Peoria Chiefs. Bibens-Dirkx finished the season with a 7–2 record with a 2.04 ERA, 50 strikeouts and one save in 12 games, eight starts. He remained with the Cubs organization for the next two seasons while also pitching in the offseasons in the Venezuelan winter league with Águilas del Zulia.

=== Washington Nationals ===
In January 2012, Bibens-Dirkx signed a minor league deal with the Washington Nationals that included an invitation to spring training. He pitched for the Double-A Harrisburg Senators and Triple-A Syracuse Chiefs in 2012.

=== Colorado Rockies ===
After leaving the Nationals, Bibens-Dirkx finished 2012 pitching for the Triple-A Colorado Springs Sky Sox in the Colorado Rockies organization. He once again pitched with Zulia in Venezuela in the winter.

=== Toronto Blue Jays ===
Bibens-Dirkx played for the High-A Dunedin Blue Jays and Double-A New Hampshire Fisher Cats in 2013 in the Toronto Blue Jays organization and also with Zulia again in the offseason. In 2014, he played for New Hampshire and the Triple-A Buffalo Bisons. He pitched again in the offseason but this time with Toros del Este in the Dominican winter league. He was signed to a minor league contract by the Blue Jays in November 2014 and spent the 2015 season with Buffalo and New Hampshire. On November 6, 2015, Bibens-Dirkx elected free agency. He spent that offseason back in Venezuela, this time with Tigres de Aragua.

=== Lancaster Barnstormers ===
On April 5, 2016, Bibens-Dirkx signed with the Lancaster Barnstormers of the Atlantic League of Professional Baseball.

=== Texas Rangers ===
On June 14, 2016, Bibens-Dirkx signed a minor league contract with the Texas Rangers organization. In 17 games (13 starts) for the Triple-A Round Rock Express, he compiled a 3–2 record and 4.34 ERA with 62 strikeouts across 85 innings pitched. Bibens-Dirkx elected free agency following the season on November 7. Bibens-Dirkx re-signed with the Rangers on a new minor league contract on December 16, 2016. He began the 2017 season with the Express.

On May 7, 2017, the Rangers promoted Bibens-Dirkx to the major leagues. He made his major league debut on May 17, 2017, pitching one inning and giving up one earned run. Bibens-Dirkx struck out Tommy Joseph of the Philadelphia Phillies for his first major league strikeout. He was outrighted to Triple-A on November 6, but declined the assignment and became a free agent. On December 19, he re-signed with the Rangers on another minor league contract.

He was assigned to Triple-A Round Rock Express to begin the 2018 season but also pitched 13 games with the Rangers during the season. On June 20, he and Isaiah Kiner-Falefa became the first two battery members with hyphenated last names. That night, he earned his first win of the season. Bibens-Dirkx made 17 appearances (15 starts) for Round Rock, compiling a 3–6 record and 5.68 ERA with 79 strikeouts across 82 1/3 innings pitched. He elected free agency following the season on November 2, 2018.

=== Uni-President Lions ===
On January 12, 2019, Bibens-Dirkx signed with the Uni-President Lions of the Chinese Professional Baseball League (CPBL). He was released on June 13, as Bibens-Dirkx wished to be with his wife in the U.S., as she was expecting a baby.

=== Texas Rangers (second stint) ===
On June 29, 2019, Bibens-Dirkx signed a minor-league contract with the Texas Rangers. In 8 starts for the Triple-A Nashville Sounds, he compiled a 7.98 ERA with 33 strikeouts across 38 1/3 innings of work. Bibens-Dirkx did not play in a game in 2020 due to the cancellation of the minor league season because of the COVID-19 pandemic. He was released by the Rangers on June 1, 2020.

=== Los Angeles Dodgers ===
On May 4, 2021, Bibens-Dirkx signed a minor league contract with the Los Angeles Dodgers organization. He appeared in 25 games (17 starts) for the Triple-A Oklahoma City Dodgers and had a 10–6 record and 5.13 ERA.

=== Sultanes de Monterrey ===
On February 7, 2022, Bibens-Dirkx signed with the Sultanes de Monterrey of the Mexican League for the 2022 season. In 3 starts, he posted a 0–1 record and 6.00 ERA.

=== Algodoneros de Unión Laguna ===
On May 10, 2022, Bibens-Dirkx was traded to the Algodoneros de Unión Laguna of the Mexican League. He made just one start, giving up 4 earned runs in 2 innings pitched. Bibens-Dirkx was released by the team on May 17.

== Coaching career ==
On January 17, 2023, Bibens-Dirkx announced that he had retired from playing and had joined the Toronto Blue Jays organization as a minor league pitching coach, joining the High-A Vancouver Canadians. In February 2025, Bibens-Dirkx was named the pitching coach of the Blue Jays' Double-A affiliate, the New Hampshire Fisher Cats.
