= Chris Cortez (baseball) =

American baseball player (born 2002)

Los Angeles Angels
- Pitcher
- Born: October 6, 2002 (age 23); Las Vegas, Nevada, U.S.
- Bats: Right Throws: Right

Christopher Diaz Cortez (born October 6, 2002) is an American professional baseball pitcher in the Los Angeles Angels organization. He played college baseball for the Texas A&M Aggies. The Angels drafted Cortez in the second round of the 2024 MLB draft.

== Early life ==
Christopher Diaz Cortez was born on October 6, 2002, in Las Vegas, Nevada, to parents Carlos and Tammy Cortez.

Cortez attended Silverado High School in Las Vegas, where he played four years of varsity baseball. In his 2017–18 freshman season, he posted a .300 batting average and a 1.89 earned run average (ERA). During his 2018–19 sophomore season, he batted .400 with nine doubles, three triples, and 19 runs batted in (RBIs) and a 3.26 ERA. Following the season, Cortez was named to the all-Desert League first team and the Nevada Preps All-State second team as a pitcher. In the COVID-19 pandemic-shortened 2019–20 season, Cortez posted a 1.36 ERA. In 2020–21, his senior year, Cortez batted .491 with 21 RBIs and went 3–1 on the mound with a 1.23 ERA and 50 strikeouts in 28 1/3 innings.

Cortez emerged from high school as a top baseball prospect, ranked second in the state of Nevada and 151st nationwide by Perfect Game. He committed to play college baseball for the Texas A&M Aggies of the Southeastern Conference (SEC).

== College career ==
Cortez made his college baseball debut on February 20, 2022, recording a win against the Fordham Rams. Texas A&M began using Cortez as a relief pitcher in his freshman season. On April 2, he set a career-high six strikeouts across 4 2/3 innings against the Kentucky Wildcats. On April 15 against the Georgia Bulldogs, he received his first and only start of the season. On May 14, Cortez worked five innings against the Mississippi State Bulldogs and earned the win. He finished his first collegiate year with a 6–3 record, 4.91 ERA, and 32 strikeouts in 44 innings. Cortez was named to the all-SEC freshman team following the season.

Cortez began his sophomore season as the Aggies' Sunday starting pitcher. In each of his first three starts, he threw five or more innings, including a six-strikeout performance against the Portland Pilots on February 26. After five starts, the Aggies moved Cortez to a bullpen role. During the 2023 NCAA Division I baseball tournament, Cortez threw 4 1/3 innings and struck out three batters in a June 4 appearance against the Stanford Cardinal at the Stanford Regional. He finished his sophomore season at 3–1 with a 7.34 ERA and 39 strikeouts in 41 1/3 innings.

In his junior season, Cortez pitched primarily as a reliever. On February 20, the first game of the season, he pitched 5 2/3 innings to record a win against the Incarnate Word Cardinals. Cortez started a game against the Texas Longhorns on March 5, pitching three innings with one run allowed and receiving a no decision. On May 5, he threw 4 1/3 of scoreless relief with six strikeouts to earn a win against the LSU Tigers.

During a 2024 NCAA Division I baseball tournament game against the Oregon Ducks on June 8, Cortez pitched 5 2/3 innings of scoreless relief and struck out a career-high 10 batters, earning the win. During a June 15 game against the Florida Gators in the first round of the College World Series, Cortez threw three innings and struck out six to earn the win. On June 23, his final game as an Aggie, Cortez threw 4 1/3 of scoreless relief, walking five batters with seven strikeouts in a loss to the Tennessee Volunteers in game two of the College World Series final. He finished the season at 10–3 with a 2.78 ERA and 102 strikeouts in 64 2/3 innings.

== Professional career ==
The Los Angeles Angels drafted Cortez in the second round of the 2024 Major League Baseball draft, the 45th overall pick. He signed with the organization on July 18 for a $1,597,500 bonus, below the league-recommended $2,072,800 slot value.

Cortez made his professional debut 2025 with High-A Tri-City Dust Devils, and spent his first professional season there. He posted a 4.28 ERA with 114 strikeouts and 84 walks in 113 2/3 innings, converting to a starting pitcher although he mainly pitched as a relief pitcher in college. He returned to Tri-City to open the 2026 season and was promoted to the Double-A Rocket City Trash Pandas in May. Following his promotion to Rocket City, Cortez began pitching out of the bullpen.
