= 2017 New York Yankees season =

Season for the Major League Baseball team the New York Yankees

2017 New York Yankees
- American League Wild Card winners
- League: American League
- Division: East
- Ballpark: Yankee Stadium
- City: New York
- Record: 91–71 (.562)
- Divisional place: 2nd
- Owners: Yankee Global Enterprises
- General managers: Brian Cashman
- Managers: Joe Girardi
- Television: YES Network; PIX 11 (Michael Kay, Ken Singleton, several others as analysts)
- Radio: WFAN SportsRadio 66 AM / 101.9 FM; New York Yankees Radio Network (John Sterling, Suzyn Waldman)

The 2017 New York Yankees season was the 115th season of the New York Yankees franchise.

In their final season under manager Joe Girardi, the Yankees finished the regular season with 91 wins and 71 losses - their first since 2012 in which they won at least 90 games. They struggled to catch up to the defending American League East champions the Boston Red Sox after being in first place at the beginning of the season, but clinched a playoff berth - their sixth wild card berth and their third in seven seasons - after missing the playoffs the previous year.

They defeated the Minnesota Twins 8–4 in the Wild Card Game (their first postseason game win in five years) and the Cleveland Indians in five games (after falling into an 0–2 deficit after the first two games in Cleveland) in the Division Series before losing to the Houston Astros in seven games in the 2017 American League Championship Series.

During the postseason, the Yankees were 6–0 at home, but went 1–6 on the road,; notably, every game in the ALCS series was won by the respective home team. The season also marked the 25th year of broadcasting for the long time play-by-play Yankee broadcaster Michael Kay, as well as the 15th anniversary season of the team's regional sports cable network, the YES Network.

This was considered a breakout season for many players, including starting pitcher Luis Severino, who emerged as arguably the Yankees' best pitcher, and rookie outfielder Aaron Judge, who broke Mark McGwire's record for most home runs by a rookie in the regular season (50) and led the American League with 52 home runs.

== Offseason ==
=== Free agent acquisitions ===
- December 7, 2016: Signed left fielder Matt Holliday for one year and $13 million.
- December 15, 2016: Signed closer, Aroldis Chapman to a five-year, $86 million deal, the largest ever for a reliever.
- February 16, 2017: Signed 1B/OF Chris Carter on a one-year, $3 million deal.

=== Trades ===
- December 3, 2016: Traded Brian McCann to the Houston Astros for Jorge Guzman and Albert Abreu.
- December 20, 2016: Traded Nick Goody to the Cleveland Indians for a player to be named later or cash considerations. The transaction was completed on May 5 with the Yankees acquiring RHP Yoiber Marquina.

== Spring training ==
The Yankees had one of their most successful spring training performances in recent memory, finishing with a 24-9-1 record - the best in the major leagues.

The team had many players participate in the 2017 World Baseball Classic, including shortstop Didi Gregorius (Netherlands) and relievers Dellin Betances (Dominican Republic), Tyler Clippard (United States), and Tommy Layne (Italy).

One of the most notable elements of Yankees camp in 2017 was the presence of top prospects. Infielders Gleyber Torres, Miguel Andujar, Tyler Wade, and Jorge Mateo, outfielders Clint Frazier, Dustin Fowler, and Aaron Judge, and pitchers Chad Green, James Kaprielian, and Jordan Montgomery highlighted the Yankees' strong farm system's presence at spring training.

Another prominent story in the early going was the rotation battle, with six pitchers battling for the final two spots following Masahiro Tanaka, Michael Pineda, and CC Sabathia: Luis Cessa, Green, Bryan Mitchell, Montgomery, Luis Severino, and Adam Warren. Each pitcher performed well in the first few weeks of Spring Training, making manager Joe Girardi's decision a difficult one. In the end, Severino came away with the fourth starter role, with the team waiting until April 10 to announce that Montgomery had won the fifth starter job. He'd make his MLB debut on April 12 against Tampa Bay.

Other position battles in Tampa included that for the starting right field job, between former first-round pick Judge and fourth outfielder Aaron Hicks. Another key competition was an unforeseen battle for the Opening Day shortstop job, as Didi Gregorius was lost for the first month with a shoulder injury suffered in the WBC. Prospect Wade, non-roster invitees Pete Kozma and Ruben Tejada, and utility infielder Ronald Torreyes all competed for the job. Not included in the shuffle were top prospects Torres and Mateo, much to the chagrin of Yankees fans. The jobs were eventually awarded to Judge and Torreyes.

On March 17, three Yankees pitchers combined to no-hit the Detroit Tigers. Tanaka allowed two walks and an error over 4 1/3 innings, Chasen Shreve retired the two batters he faced, and Montgomery shut down Detroit's final 12 batters as the Yankees won, 3–0. It was the first no-hitter in Spring Training since the Atlanta Braves tied the Houston Astros in 2015, and the first for the Yankees since an 11–0 drubbing of the Pittsburgh Pirates in 1983.

== Regular season ==
=== April ===
Going into the start of the regular season, the Yankees were a mystery to many analysts, as the team was not expected to do much while putting up historic numbers in spring training. Masahiro Tanaka, who had put up spectacular statistics during the spring, including having pitched in a combined no-hitter, was tagged to start Opening Day against the Tampa Bay Rays, in which he'd struggle greatly. CC Sabathia pitched the second game of the young season, pulling the team to a 1–1 record, but the rest of the rotation continued to struggle. Through the team's first five games (3 at Tampa Bay, 2 at Baltimore Orioles) the Yankees were 1–4. In the third game of the series against the Orioles, the Yankees came from behind to win the game, going into their first home stand of the season having gotten their second win.

This momentum would benefit the team greatly, as the Yankees would sweep the first 2 series at Yankee Stadium (3 games against the Rays, 3 games against the St. Louis Cardinals), and taking 2 of 3 against the Chicago White Sox. The Yankees would continue to maintain this momentum through the rest of April, finishing the month with a record of 15–8.

One of the main storylines of the early season were the series of injuries the Yankees suffered. The team started the season without their shortstop, Didi Gregorius, who had maintained an injury playing in the 2017 World Baseball Classic. The team also lost rookie sensation catcher Gary Sanchez within the first five games, and Greg Bird, the first baseman who had missed the entire 2016 season, was performing abysmally, recording only six hits in his first 60 at bats. However, the team managed to work around these issues. Ronald Torreyes and Austin Romine, who were brought in to replace Gregorius and Sanchez, respectively, blew away the expectations placed on them and put up some of the best numbers for players at their positions. Aaron Hicks, who had struggled for much of the 2016 season played exceedingly well, Chase Headley put his lackluster performance in April of the previous season to shame, Starlin Castro hit well enough for the second-best batting average in the American League, and the rotation as a whole pitched amazingly, putting up some of the best numbers in the American League.

By far the biggest story of April, though, was rookie outfielder Aaron Judge. Having struggled in his debut season of 2016, Judge worked extensively over the offseason to adjust his mechanics, reducing his strikeouts and increasing contact rate, while honing his impressive natural power. The adjustments were wildly successful, as Judge dramatically reduced his strikeout rate, put up one of the best batting averages in the league, and tied the record for most home runs by a rookie in the month of April, with 10.

In a dramatic game, on Friday, April 28, 2017, the Yankees, at home facing the Orioles, struggled offensively to start the game, with starter Sabathia proving to be ineffective. At the middle of the 6th inning, the Orioles held a 9–1 lead over the Yankees. The Yankees then put up 3 runs in the bottom of the 6th, to which the Orioles responded by adding 2 more runs, making the game 11–4. The Yankees reduced the deficit with a Jacoby Ellsbury grand slam making it 11–8. The Yankees then scored a run in the 9th with an RBI groundout by Ellsbury, followed by a two-run shot by Castro to tie the game. Then, with one out in the bottom of the 10th, Matt Holliday won the game with a 3-run walk-off homerun, capping off an "impossible" comeback win. With it, the Yankees won their fourth come-from-behind game in which they were losing by 8-or-more runs since 2005, twice as many as the next best team.

=== May ===
The Yankees entered May tied with the Baltimore Orioles for first place in the AL East with a 15–8 (.652) record, much better than their 8–15 (.348) 23-game start in 2016. During the opening series of May, Jacoby Ellsbury sustained an injury that would sideline him for nearly a week after colliding into the Yankee Stadium center field wall in a game against the Toronto Blue Jays. On May 2, first baseman Greg Bird was placed on the 10-day disabled list with a nagging ankle injury. The next day, right fielder Aaron Judge was named Rookie of the Month for April, 2017, beating out solid performances from Boston's Andrew Benintendi and Seattle's Mitch Haniger.

On May 7, the Yankees completed a sweep of the defending-champion Chicago Cubs at Wrigley Field in Chicago with an 18-inning 5–4 victory that extended deep into the night (it lasted over six hours by the time the night was done). After closer Aroldis Chapman blew his first save of the season by allowing three runs in the bottom of the ninth, the Yankees' bullpen carried the team through another complete game's worth of extra innings. Of note in this game was that the Yankees and Cubs set the MLB record for strikeouts in a single game with 48. The Yankees also set a major-league record of seven pitchers with multiple strikeouts in their appearances (Luis Severino, Dellin Betances, Chapman, Tyler Clippard, Adam Warren, Jonathan Holder, and Chasen Shreve). Following the victory (and the Washington Nationals' loss), the Yankees held sole possession of the best record in the major leagues at 20–9.

The Yankees retired Derek Jeter's No.2 jersey and played a single-admission double-header on Mother's Day, May 12. The rest of the month would see the Yankees cool off, a result of struggles from Tanaka, a lower output by the offense in general, and a slow-down in the rate Judge hit homers, though he would still finish out the month with 17 homeruns on the season and the AL Rookie of the Month for May. The Yankees would compete with the Orioles for first place until the last week of the month, with the Orioles falling to third, being leapfrogged by the Red Sox. On May 31, the Yankees sat in first place with a record of 30–20 (good for the second-best AL record, behind the 1st place Houston Astros), the Red Sox sitting at 29–23 and the Orioles at 27–24.

=== June ===
From June 7–11, the Yankees scored 8 or more runs in 5 straight games for the first time since 1956.

=== July ===
On July 18 the Yankees acquired Todd Frazier, David Robertson and Tommy Kahnle in a 7-player trade with the Chicago White Sox.

=== August ===
==== Yankees-Tigers brawl ====
On August 24, 2017, at Comerica Park the Yankees and Detroit Tigers game broke into a brawl. The altercation led to several suspensions and fines for players on both teams, with the game being labeled as the "MLB's wildest game of the 2017 season."

With the Tigers up 6–3, Yankees pitcher Aroldis Chapman began to warm up in replacement for the ejected Kahnle. Yankees catcher Austin Romine and Tigers designated hitter Miguel Cabrera were standing facing each other behind the plate, as Romine was due to catch and Cabrera was due to bat. With Torres' back turned facing them, the two exchanged phrases until Cabrera stepped towards Romine, leading Romine to take off his catcher's mask. Cabrera then shoved Romine in the chest. Romine tackled Cabrera to the ground, with the two throwing punches at each other. At this point, the benches on both sides cleared, and a fight formed in the center of the field. Gary Sánchez ran out from the dugout and landed punches on Cabrera and Tigers' third baseman Nicholas Castellanos before his teammate, injured Yankees' outfielder Clint Frazier, attempted to restrain Sánchez. Austin Romine ended up beside his brother, Tigers infielder Andrew Romine. As the fight cleared, both Austin Romine and Cabrera were ejected from the game for their roles in the fight.

In a postgame press conference, Girardi visibly expressed frustration with the umpiring crew for their mishandling of the situation. In particular, he cited the lack of warning given for Fulmer's hit on Sánchez, stating "If you can't see that Fulmer clearly hit Sánchez on purpose, there's something wrong [...] I think it could have really been avoidable." He stressed the importance of the game due to the Yankees' playoff aspirations compared to the 4th-place Tigers, and cited an inconsistent strike zone at the end of the game. Regarding Romine's ejection, he said "Cabrera went after him and you're gonna throw my catcher out for protecting himself? I mean, pay attention. Somebody's gotta pay attention to what's going on in this game." He demanded additional discipline for Ausmus, rhetorically asking, "Brad Ausmus is going to say 'F-you' to one of my players? Come on, Brad. What is that?"

Romine claimed that Cabrera asked him, "You got a fucking problem with me?", then took off his mask and got shoved to the ground. "It felt like he wanted a confrontation there and I just tried to defend myself the best I could." Sánchez, who was seen throwing punches, stated through his interpreter that "At that moment, instinct just takes over, because you want to defend your teammate. That's your family out there."

Gardner, who was involved in altercations with Ausmus and Iglesias, said "I thought the way things were handled, things got out of hand in a hurry. You'd like to see that get squashed from the start. It's not good for the game... I think any time you go through some controversy, it can bring guys together." Todd Frazier, on getting hit by Wilson, said "I thought everything was done with. I just kept asking him, 'Did you do that on purpose?' He wouldn't say a word, just kept staring at me, and that's when I got pretty excited."

The next day, Major League Baseball announced discipline for the players involved in the brawl, including the suspensions of five players and managers and the finings of seven additional participants. Cabrera received the longest suspension at seven games, while Yankees catcher Sánchez received the longest suspension on his team at four games. All disciplined players had their suspensions reduced by one game following appeals.

The Yankees were swept at home by the American League-leading Cleveland team from August 28–30, after which Cleveland went on to record a historic 22-game win streak.

=== September ===
In September, Aaron Judge broke out of a prolonged slump and the Yankees pulled ahead in the American League wildcard race by winning 23 of their final 34 games. From September 11–13 a three-game series against the Tampa Bay Rays was relocated from Tropicana Field to Citi Field due to Hurricane Irma, marking the first time since 1998 that the Yankees played a game in Queens not against the Mets.

The Yankees clinched a post-season berth in Toronto on September 23. The Yankees continued their 6-man starting rotation throughout the month. Both relief pitchers Dellin Betances and Aroldis Chapman showed some struggles during this month.

On September 25 in a makeup game against the Kansas City Royals, Aaron Judge tied and broke the MLB rookie record for home runs hit in a single year. In doing so, he also became the youngest player to have 7 multi-home run games in Yankee history since Babe Ruth and Mickey Mantle.

=== October ===
The Yankees faced the Minnesota Twins for the AL Wild Card Game, in which they won 8–4. The Twins took a 3–0 lead on Yankees star pitcher Luis Severino in the first inning, but New York responded quick and the Twins would be unable to take back the lead.

Following the victory, the team traveled to Cleveland to face the Cleveland Indians (now Cleveland Guardians) in the ALDS. New York fell to 0–2 in the series, putting them one loss away from elimination. However, upon returning to the Bronx, the Yankees took 2 games. The Yankees won the series in Game 5, in which fan-favorite shortstop Didi Gregorius pulled two home runs to right field. The Yankees final record of the ALDS was 3–2.

After reaching the ALCS, the American League Championship Series, the Yankees fell 0–2 against the Houston Astros in Houston. Game 2 was particularly stinging for the team, as it came on a walk-off hit. From games 3–5, the Yankees offense lit up and took the series lead of 3–2. This can be attributed to the home field advantage the Yankees held. The Yankees traveled to Houston once again in hopes to win the AL pennant, shocking the baseball world. Unfortunately for the team, they were unable to win games 6-7 and were eliminated. The Houston Astros went on to win the World Series, but the authenticity of their championship is questioned due to their recent cheating scandal. The Yankees final record of the ALCS was 3–4.

Joe Girardi, the Yankees manager, was promptly fired following elimination. His replacement would be 2003 ALCS Yankees hero Aaron Boone.

== Season standings ==
=== American League East ===
AL East
Team	W	L	Pct.	GB	Home	Road
Boston Red Sox	93	69	.574	—	48‍–‍33	45‍–‍36
New York Yankees	91	71	.562	2	51‍–‍30	40‍–‍41
Tampa Bay Rays	80	82	.494	13	42‍–‍39	38‍–‍43
Toronto Blue Jays	76	86	.469	17	42‍–‍39	34‍–‍47
Baltimore Orioles	75	87	.463	18	46‍–‍35	29‍–‍52

=== American League Wild Card ===
Division leaders
Team	W	L	Pct.
Cleveland Indians	102	60	.630
Houston Astros	101	61	.623
Boston Red Sox	93	69	.574

Wild Card teams (Top 2 teams qualify for postseason)
Team	W	L	Pct.	GB
New York Yankees	91	71	.562	+6
Minnesota Twins	85	77	.525	—
Kansas City Royals	80	82	.494	5
Los Angeles Angels	80	82	.494	5
Tampa Bay Rays	80	82	.494	5
Seattle Mariners	78	84	.481	7
Texas Rangers	78	84	.481	7
Toronto Blue Jays	76	86	.469	9
Baltimore Orioles	75	87	.463	10
Oakland Athletics	75	87	.463	10
Chicago White Sox	67	95	.414	18
Detroit Tigers	64	98	.395	21

=== Record against opponents ===
2017 American League record Source: MLB Standings Grid – 2017
Team	BAL	BOS	CWS	CLE	DET	HOU	KC	LAA	MIN	NYY	OAK	SEA	TB	TEX	TOR	NL
Baltimore	—	10–9	4–3	1–6	3–4	1–5	3–3	2–4	2–5	7–12	4–3	4–2	8–11	6–1	12–7	8–12
Boston	9–10	—	6–1	4–3	3–4	3–4	2–4	2–4	5–2	8–11	3–4	3–3	11–8	5–1	13–6	16–4
Chicago	3–4	1–6	—	6–13	10–9	4–2	10–9	3–4	7–12	3–4	1–5	3–4	3–3	4–3	3–3	6–14
Cleveland	6–1	3–4	13–6	—	13–6	5–1	12–7	6–0	12–7	5–2	3–4	4–2	4–3	6–1	4–2	6–14
Detroit	4–3	4–3	9–10	6–13	—	3–4	8–11	3–4	8–11	3–3	1–5	1–6	2–5	1–5	3–3	8–12
Houston	5–1	4–3	2–4	1–5	4–3	—	3–4	12–7	5–1	5–2	12–7	14–5	3–4	12–7	4–3	15–5
Kansas City	3–3	4–2	9–10	7–12	11–8	4–3	—	6–1	8–11	2–5	3–3	5–2	4–3	1–6	3–3	9–11
Los Angeles	4–2	4–2	4–3	0–6	4–3	7–12	1–6	—	2–5	4–2	12–7	12–7	3–4	8–11	4–3	11–9
Minnesota	5–2	2–5	12–7	7–12	11–8	1–5	11–8	5–2	—	2–4	3–3	3–4	2–4	4–3	4–3	13–7
New York	12–7	11–8	4–3	2–5	3–3	2–5	5–2	2–4	4–2	—	2–5	5–2	12–7	3–3	9–10	15–5
Oakland	3–4	4–3	5–1	4–3	5–1	7–12	3–3	7–12	3–3	5–2	—	7–12	2–5	10–9	2–5	7–13
Seattle	2–4	3–3	4–3	2–4	6–1	5–14	2–5	7–12	4–3	2–5	12–7	—	5–1	11–8	1–6	12–8
Tampa Bay	11–8	8–11	3–3	3–4	5–2	4–3	3–4	4–3	4–2	7–12	5–2	1–5	—	2–4	9–10	11–9
Texas	1–6	1–5	3–4	1–6	5–1	7–12	6–1	11–8	3–4	3–3	9–10	8–11	4–2	—	3–4	14–6
Toronto	7–12	6–13	3–3	2–4	3–3	3–4	3–3	3–4	3–4	10–9	5–2	6–1	10–9	4–3	—	9–11

== Roster ==
2017 New York Yankees
Roster
Pitchers: 68 Dellin Betances; 85 Luis Cessa; 54 Aroldis Chapman; 29 Tyler Clippard; 30,50 Giovanny Gallegos; 34 Jaime García; 50,64 Domingo Germán; 55 Sonny Gray; 57 Chad Green; 41,50,61 Ben Heller; 30,41 Ronald Herrera; 65 Jonathan Holder; 48 Tommy Kahnle; 39 Tommy Layne; 55,66 Bryan Mitchell; 47 Jordan Montgomery; 35 Michael Pineda; 30 David Robertson; 52 CC Sabathia; 40 Luis Severino; 45 Chasen Shreve; 41 Caleb Smith; 19 Masahiro Tanaka; 43 Adam Warren; 36,50 Tyler Webb	Catchers: 38 Kyle Higashioka; 36 Erik Kratz; 27 Austin Romine; 24 Gary Sánchez; Infielders: 41,67 Miguel Andújar; 26 Tyler Austin; 33 Greg Bird; 48 Chris Carter; 14 Starlin Castro; 36 Ji-Man Choi; 64 Garrett Cooper; 29 Todd Frazier; 18 Didi Gregorius; 12 Chase Headley; 17 Matt Holliday; 30 Pete Kozma; 74 Ronald Torreyes; 39 Tyler Wade	Outfielders: 22 Jacoby Ellsbury; 34 Dustin Fowler; 30,77 Clint Frazier; 11 Brett Gardner; 31 Aaron Hicks; 99 Aaron Judge; 30,38 Rob Refsnyder; 41 Mason Williams	Manager: 28 Joe Girardi; Coaches: -- Jason Brown (bullpen catcher); 62 Alan Cockrell (hitting); 53 Joe Espada (third base/infield); 60 Mike Harkey (bullpen); 56 Tony Peña (first base/catching); 58 Larry Rothschild (pitching); 63 Marcus Thames (asst. hitting); 59 Rob Thomson (bench)

== Game log ==
Legend
	Yankees win
	Yankees loss
	Postponement
**Bold**	Yankees team member

game log (91–71 (Home: 51–30 Away: 40–41))
April (15–8) Home: 10–2 Away: 5–6

#	Date	Opponent	Stadium	Score	Win	Loss	Save	Attendance	Record
1	April 2	@ Rays	3–7	Archer (1–0)	**Tanaka** (0–1)	Colomé (1)	Tropicana Field	31,042	0–1
2	April 4	@ Rays	5–0	**Sabathia** (1–0)	Odorizzi (0–1)	–	Tropicana Field	19,366	1–1
3	April 5	@ Rays	1–4	Cobb (1–0)	**Pineda** (0–1)	Colomé (2)	Tropicana Field	12,737	1–2
4	April 7	@ Orioles	5–6	Hart (1–0)	**Clippard** (0–1)	Britton (2)	Oriole Park	25,248	1–3
5	April 8	@ Orioles	4–5	Givens (1–0)	**Betances** (0–1)	Britton (3)	Oriole Park	38,916	1–4
6	April 9	@ Orioles	7–3	**Betances** (1–1)	O'Day (0–1)	–	Oriole Park	42,487	2–4
7	April 10	Rays	8–1	**Pineda** (1–1)	Cobb (1–1)	–	**Yankee Stadium**	46,955	3–4
8	April 12	Rays	8–4	**Mitchell** (1–0)	Diaz (0–1)	**Chapman** (1)	**Yankee Stadium**	38,002	4–4
9	April 13	Rays	3–2	**Severino** (1–0)	Cedeno (1–1)	**Chapman** (2)	**Yankee Stadium**	34,772	5–4
10	April 14	Cardinals	4–3	**Tanaka** (1–1)	Wacha (1–1)	**Chapman** (3)	**Yankee Stadium**	39,102	6–4
11	April 15	Cardinals	3–2	**Sabathia** (2–0)	Martinez (0–2)	**Clippard** (1)	**Yankee Stadium**	43,031	7–4
12	April 16	Cardinals	9–3	**Pineda** (2–1)	Wainwright (0–3)	–	**Yankee Stadium**	31,706	8–4
13	April 17	White Sox	7–4	**Montgomery** (1–0)	Holland (1–2)	**Chapman** (4)	**Yankee Stadium**	28,181	9–4
14	April 18	White Sox	1–4	González (2–0)	**Severino** (1–1)	Robertson (4)	**Yankee Stadium**	30,075	9–5
15	April 19	White Sox	9–1	**Tanaka** (2–1)	Covey (0–1)	–	**Yankee Stadium**	30,014	10–5
16	April 21	@ Pirates	3–6	Nicasio (1–2)	**Sabathia** (2–1)	Watson (5)	PNC Park	30,565	10–6
17	April 22	@ Pirates	11–5	**Betances** (2–1)	Rivero (1–1)	–	PNC Park	36,140	11–6
18	April 23	@ Pirates	1–2	Nova (2–2)	**Montgomery** (1–1)	Watson (6)	PNC Park	36,140	11–7
––	April 25	@ Red Sox	Postponed (rain). Makeup date: July 16. as a doubleheader						
19	April 26	@ Red Sox	3–1	**Severino** (2–1)	Porcello (1–3)	**Chapman** (5)	Fenway Park	32,072	12–7
20	April 27	@ Red Sox	3–0	**Tanaka** (3–1)	Sale (1–2)	–	Fenway Park	34,054	13–7
21	April 28	Orioles	14–11 (10)	**Chapman** (1–0)	Aquino (1–1)	–	**Yankee Stadium**	36,912	14–7
22	April 29	Orioles	12–4	**Pineda** (3–1)	Jiménez (1–1)	–	**Yankee Stadium**	37,303	15–7
23	April 30	Orioles	4–7 (11)	Verrett (1–0)	**Mitchell** (1–1)	–	**Yankee Stadium**	41,022	15–8

May (15–12) Home: 7–6 Away: 8–6

#	Date	Opponent	Stadium	Score	Win	Loss	Save	Attendance	Record
24	May 1	Blue Jays	1–7	Estrada (1–1)	**Severino** (2–2)	–	**Yankee Stadium**	25,566	15–9
25	May 2	Blue Jays	11–5	**Tanaka** (4–1)	Latos (0–1)	—	**Yankee Stadium**	30,058	16–9
26	May 3	Blue Jays	8–6	**Betances** (3–1)	Biagini (0–1)	**Chapman** (6)	**Yankee Stadium**	35,559	17–9
27	May 5	@ Cubs	3–2	**Holder** (1–0)	Rondón (0–1)	**Chapman** (7)	Wrigley Field	40,395	18–9
28	May 6	@ Cubs	11–6	**Montgomery** (2–1)	Anderson (2–2)	—	Wrigley Field	40,735	19–9
29	May 7	@ Cubs	5–4 (18)	**Shreve** (1–0)	Strop (0–2)	—	Wrigley Field	40,584	20–9
30	May 8	@ Reds	10–4	**Tanaka** (5–1)	Davis (1–2)	—	Great American Ball Park	25,960	21–9
31	May 9	@ Reds	3–5	Adleman (2–1)	**Sabathia** (2–2)	Iglesias (6)	Great American Ball Park	22,035	21–10
32	May 11	Astros	2–3	Keuchel (6–0)	**Pineda** (3–2)	Giles (10)	**Yankee Stadium**	39,050	21–11
33	May 12	Astros	1–5	McCullers Jr. (3–1)	**Montgomery** (2–2)	—	**Yankee Stadium**	41,150	21–12
––	May 13	Astros	Postponed (inclement weather). Makeup date: May 14 as a doubleheader						
34	May 14	Astros	11–6	**Warren** (1–0)	Harris (1–1)	–	**Yankee Stadium**	N/A	22–12
35	May 14	Astros	7–10	Morton (5–2)	**Tanaka** (5–2)	–	**Yankee Stadium**	47,883	22–13
36	May 16	@ Royals	7–1	**Sabathia** (3–2)	Hammel (1–5)	–	Kauffman Stadium	30,878	23–13
37	May 17	@ Royals	11–7	**Pineda** (4–2)	Vargas (5–2)	**Betances** (1)	Kauffman Stadium	22,899	24–13
38	May 18	@ Royals	1–5	Duffy (3–3)	**Montgomery** (2–3)	–	Kauffman Stadium	22,803	24–14
39	May 19	@ Rays	4–5	Farquhar (2–1)	**Clippard** (0–2)	Colomé (11)	Tropicana Field	21,146	24–15
40	May 20	@ Rays	5–9	Andriese (4–1)	**Tanaka** (5–3)	–	Tropicana Field	22,864	24–16
41	May 21	@ Rays	3–2	**Sabathia** (4–2)	Archer (3–3)	**Betances** (2)	Tropicana Field	20,873	25–16
42	May 22	Royals	4–2	**Pineda** (5–2)	Vargas (5–3)	**Betances** (3)	**Yankee Stadium**	35,005	26–16
43	May 23	Royals	2–6	Duffy (4–3)	**Warren** (1–1)		**Yankee Stadium**	35,931	26–17
44	May 24	Royals	3–0	**Severino** (3–2)	Hammel (1–6)	**Betances** (4)	**Yankee Stadium**	34,610	27–17
—	May 25	Royals	Postponed (rain). Makeup date: September 25						
45	May 26	Athletics	1–4	Manaea (3–3)	**Tanaka** (5–4)		**Yankee Stadium**	39,044	27–18
46	May 27	Athletics	3–2	**Sabathia** (5–2)	Cotton (3–5)	**Betances** (5)	**Yankee Stadium**	40,218	28–18
47	May 28	Athletics	9–5	**Pineda** (6–2)	Triggs (5–4)	**Warren** (1)	**Yankee Stadium**	45,232	29–18
48	May 29	@ Orioles	2–3	Bundy (6–3)	**Montgomery** (2–4)	Brach (10)	Oriole Park	40,242	29–19
49	May 30	@ Orioles	8–3	**Severino** (4–2)	Tillman (1–2)	–	Oriole Park	16,126	30–19
50	May 31	@ Orioles	4–10	Gausman (3–4)	**Tanaka** (5–5)	–	Oriole Park	22,983	30–20

June (13–15) Home: 7–5 Away: 6–10

#	Date	Opponent	Stadium	Score	Win	Loss	Save	Attendance	Record
51	June 1	@ Blue Jays	12–2	**Sabathia** (6–2)	Estrada (4–3)	—	Rogers Centre	37,722	31–20
52	June 2	@ Blue Jays	5–7	Liriano (3–2)	**Pineda** (6–3)	Osuna (12)	Rogers Centre	44,261	31–21
53	June 3	@ Blue Jays	7–0	**Montgomery** (3–4)	Biagini (1–4)	—	Rogers Centre	47,226	32–21
54	June 4	@ Blue Jays	2–3	Smith (2–0)	**Clippard** (0–3)	Osuna (13)	Rogers Centre	46,782	32–22
55	June 6	Red Sox	4–5	Pomeranz (6–3)	**Tanaka** (5–6)	Kimbrel (17)	**Yankee Stadium**	41,516	32–23
56	June 7	Red Sox	8–0	**Sabathia** (7–2)	Porcello (3–8)	—	**Yankee Stadium**	44,380	33–23
57	June 8	Red Sox	9–1	**Pineda** (7–3)	Price (1–1)	—	**Yankee Stadium**	46,194	34–23
58	June 9	Orioles	8–2	**Montgomery** (4–4)	Bundy (6–5)	—	**Yankee Stadium**	46,031	35–23
59	June 10	Orioles	16–3	**Severino** (5–2)	Tillman (1–4)		**Yankee Stadium**	45,232	36–23
60	June 11	Orioles	14–3	**Warren** (2–1)	Gausman (3–5)		**Yankee Stadium**	46,348	37–23
61	June 12	@ Angels	5–3	**Clippard** (1–3)	Álvarez (0–3)	**Betances** (6)	Angel Stadium	36,245	38–23
62	June 13	@ Angels	2–3 (11)	Middleton (2–0)	**Shreve** (1–1)	—	Angel Stadium	33,159	38–24
63	June 14	@ Angels	5–7	Parker (2–2)	**Herrera** (0–1)	Hernandez (1)	Angel Stadium	43,851	38–25
64	June 15	@ Athletics	7–8 (11)	Hendriks (3–1)	**Gallegos** (0–1)	—	Oakland Coliseum	21,838	38–26
65	June 16	@ Athletics	6–7	Coulombe (1–1)	**Holder** (1–1)	Casilla (11)	Oakland Coliseum	30,184	38–27
66	June 17	@ Athletics	2–5	Jesse Hahn (3–4)	**Tanaka** (5–7)	Doolittle (2)	Oakland Coliseum	31,418	38–28
67	June 18	@ Athletics	3–4	Cotton (4–7)	**Cessa** (0–1)	Doolittle (3)	Oakland Coliseum	34,140	38–29
68	June 20	Angels	3–8	Parker (3–2)	**Clippard** (1–4)	—	**Yankee Stadium**	39,853	38–30
69	June 21	Angels	8–4	**Montgomery** (5–4)	Nolasco (2–9)	–	**Yankee Stadium**	39,911	39–30
70	June 22	Angels	5–10	Petit (2–0)	**Severino** (5–3)	–	**Yankee Stadium**	43,051	39–31
71	June 23	Rangers	2–1 (10)	**Shreve** (2–1)	Bush (2–3)	–	**Yankee Stadium**	39,602	40–31
72	June 24	Rangers	1–8	Bibens-Dirkx (3–0)	**Cessa** (0–2)	—	**Yankee Stadium**	40,225	40–32
73	June 25	Rangers	6–7	Martinez (3–3)	**Pineda** (7–4)	Bush (9)	**Yankee Stadium**	46,625	40–33
74	June 26	@ White Sox	6–5	**Montgomery** (6–4)	Holmberg (1–2)	**Chapman** (8)	U.S. Cellular Field	20,339	41–33
75	June 27	@ White Sox	3–4	Jennings (3–1)	**Betances** (3–2)	—	U.S. Cellular Field	18,023	41–34
76	June 28	@ White Sox	12–3	**Tanaka** (6–7)	Rodon (0–1)	—	U.S. Cellular Field	15,259	42–34
77	June 29	@ White Sox	3–4	Shields (2–1)	**Cessa** (0–3)	Robertson (12)	U.S. Cellular Field	21,032	42–35
78	June 30	@ Astros	13–4	**Pineda** (8–4)	Feliz (4–2)	**Mitchell** (1)	Minute Maid Park	40,024	43–35

July (14–12) Home: 8–5 Away: 6–7

#	Date	Opponent	Stadium	Score	Win	Loss	Save	Attendance	Record
79	July 1	@ Astros	6–7	Diaz (1–1)	**Betances** (3–3)	Giles (19)	Minute Maid Park	41,010	43–36
80	July 2	@ Astros	1–8	Devenski (5–3)	**Severino** (5–4)	—	Minute Maid Park	41,761	43–37
81	July 3	Blue Jays	6–3	**Tanaka** (7–7)	Stroman (8–5)	–	**Yankee Stadium**	46,616	44–37
82	July 4	Blue Jays	1–4	Happ (6–5)	**Sabathia** (7–3)	Osuna (20)	**Yankee Stadium**	44,018	44–38
83	July 5	Blue Jays	6–7	Barnes (2–2)	**Betances** (3–4)	Osuna (21)	**Yankee Stadium**	38,691	44–39
84	July 7	Brewers	4–9	Hader (1–0)	**Clippard** (1–5)	—	**Yankee Stadium**	43,472	44–40
85	July 8	Brewers	5–3	**Chapman** (2–0)	Knebel (0–2)	–	**Yankee Stadium**	40,224	45–40
86	July 9	Brewers	3–5	Nelson (8–4)	**Tanaka** (7–8)	Knebel (14)	**Yankee Stadium**	43,952	45–41
**88th All-Star Game in Miami, Florida**
87	July 14	@ Red Sox	4–5	Scott (1–1)	**Chapman** (2–1)	—	Fenway Park	37,570	45–42
88	July 15	@ Red Sox	4–1 (16)	**Heller** (1–0)	Fister (0–3)	–	Fenway Park	36,936	46–42
89	July 16	@ Red Sox	3–0	**Sabathia** (8–3)	Porcello (4–12)	**Chapman** (9)	Fenway Park	37,343	47–42
90	July 16	@ Red Sox	0–3	Price (5–2)	**Tanaka** (7–9)	Kimbrel (24)	Fenway Park	36,719	47–43
91	July 17	@ Twins	2–4	Rogers (5–1)	**Smith** (0–1)	Kintzler (26)	Target Field	27,566	47–44
92	July 18	@ Twins	6–3	**Shreve** (3–1)	Colón (2–9)	**Chapman** (10)	Target Field	33,114	48–44
93	July 19	@ Twins	1–6	Berríos (9–3)	**Montgomery** (6–5)	—	Target Field	33,380	48–45
94	July 20	@ Mariners	4–1	**Severino** (6–4)	Hernández (5–4)	—	Safeco Field	35,175	49–45
95	July 21	@ Mariners	5–1	**Sabathia** (9–3)	Moore (1–2)	—	Safeco Field	34,073	50–45
96	July 22	@ Mariners	5–6 (10)	Zych (4–2)	**Warren** (2–2)	—	Safeco Field	46,197	50–46
97	July 23	@ Mariners	6–4	**Green** (1–0)	Pazos (2–3)	**Chapman** (11)	Safeco Field	38,503	51–46
98	July 25	Reds	4–2	**Montgomery** (7–5)	Castillo (1–4)	**Chapman** (12)	**Yankee Stadium**	44,258	52–46
99	July 26	Reds	9–5	**Severino** (7–4)	Bailey (2–5)	—	**Yankee Stadium**	42,421	53–46
100	July 27	Rays	6–5 (11)	**Chapman** (3–1)	Kittredge (0–1)	—	**Yankee Stadium**	44,033	54–46
101	July 28	Rays	6–1	**Tanaka** (8–9)	Pruitt (5–2)	—	**Yankee Stadium**	40,470	55–46
102	July 29	Rays	5–4	**Chapman** (4–1)	Boxberger (2–3)	—	**Yankee Stadium**	43,015	56–46
103	July 30	Rays	3–5	Cishek (2–1)	**Montgomery** (7–6)	Colomé (30)	**Yankee Stadium**	41,547	56–47
104	July 31	Tigers	7–3	**Severino** (8–4)	Fulmer (10–9)	**Chapman** (13)	**Yankee Stadium**	39,904	57–47

August (14–15) Home: 7–8 Away: 7–7

#	Date	Opponent	Stadium	Score	Win	Loss	Save	Attendance	Record
105	August 1	Tigers	3–4	Sánchez (3–1)	**Sabathia** (9–4)	Greene (1)	**Yankee Stadium**	43,238	57–48
106	August 2	Tigers	0–2	Zimmermann (7–8)	**Tanaka** (8–10)	Greene (2)	**Yankee Stadium**	43,379	57–49
107	August 3	@ Indians	1–5	Kluber (9–3)	**Gray** (6–6)	—	Progressive Field	28,124	57–50
108	August 4	@ Indians	2–7	Bauer (10–8)	**García** (5–8)	—	Progressive Field	34,466	57–51
109	August 5	@ Indians	2–1	**Robertson** (5–2)	McAllister (1–1)	**Chapman** (14)	Progressive Field	34,651	58–51
110	August 6	@ Indians	8–1	**Severino** (9–4)	Carrasco (10–5)	—	Progressive Field	33,044	59–51
111	August 8	@ Blue Jays	2–4	Happ (5–8)	**Sabathia** (9–5)	Osuna (29)	Rogers Centre	41,596	59–52
112	August 9	@ Blue Jays	11–5	**Green** (2–0)	Tepesch (0–2)	—	Rogers Centre	39,554	60–52
113	August 10	@ Blue Jays	0–4	Estrada (5–7)	**Gray** (6–7)	—	Rogers Centre	43,212	60–53
114	August 11	Red Sox	5–4	**Warren** (3–2)	Reed (1–3)	**Chapman** (15)	**Yankee Stadium**	46,509	61–53
115	August 12	Red Sox	5–10	Pomeranz (12–4)	**Severino** (9–5)	—	**Yankee Stadium**	47,241	61–54
116	August 13	Red Sox	2–3 (10)	Kimbrel (4–0)	**Chapman** (4–2)	—	**Yankee Stadium**	46,610	61–55
117	August 14	Mets	4–2	**Robertson** (6–2)	Robles (7–4)	**Betances** (7)	**Yankee Stadium**	45,619	62–55
118	August 15	Mets	5–4	**Gray** (7–7)	deGrom (13–6)	**Chapman** (16)	**Yankee Stadium**	46,474	63–55
119	August 16	@ Mets	5–3	**Kahnle** (2–3)	Sewald (0–5)	**Robertson** (14)	Citi Field	42,260	64–55
120	August 17	@ Mets	7–5	**Severino** (10–5)	Matz (2–7)	**Betances** (8)	Citi Field	42,549	65–55
121	August 18	@ Red Sox	6–9	Reed (2–3)	**Kahnle** (2–4)	Kimbrel (29)	Fenway Park	36,784	65–56
122	August 19	@ Red Sox	4–3	**Sabathia** (10–5)	Sale (14–5)	**Betances** (9)	Fenway Park	36,784	66–56
123	August 20	@ Red Sox	1–5	Porcello (8–14)	**Gray** (8–9)	—	Fenway Park	36,911	66–57
124	August 22	@ Tigers	13–4	**Tanaka** (9–10)	Boyd (5–7)	—	Comerica Park	27,818	67–57
125	August 23	@ Tigers	10–2	**Severino** (11–5)	Zimmermann (7–11)	—	Comerica Park	29,695	68–57
126	August 24	@ Tigers	6–10	Wilson (2–4)	**Betances** (3–5)	Greene (4)	Comerica Park	32,662	68–58
127	August 25	Mariners	1–2 (11)	Pazos (4–4)	**Chapman** (4–3)	Díaz (30)	**Yankee Stadium**	42,057	68–59
128	August 26	Mariners	6–3	**Gray** (8–8)	Gallardo (5–10)	**Betances** (10)	**Yankee Stadium**	39,810	69–59
129	August 27	Mariners	10–1	**Tanaka** (10–10)	Albers (2–1)	—	**Yankee Stadium**	40,112	70–59
130	August 28	Indians	2–6	Kluber (13–4)	**Severino** (11–6)	—	**Yankee Stadium**	36,253	70–60
—	August 29	Indians	Postponed (rain). Makeup date: August 30						
131	August 30	Indians	1–2	Bauer (14–8)	**García** (5–9)	Allen (22)	**Yankee Stadium**		70–61
132	August 30	Indians	4–9	Merritt (2–0)	**Montgomery** (7–7)	—	**Yankee Stadium**	39,598	70–62
133	August 31	Red Sox	6–2	**Sabathia** (11–5)	Rodriguez (4–5)	—	**Yankee Stadium**	43,309	71–62

September/October (20–9) Home: 13–4 Away: 7–5

#	Date	Opponent	Stadium	Score	Win	Loss	Save	Attendance	Record
134	September 1	Red Sox	1–4	Fister (4–7)	**Gray** (8–9)	Kimbrel (32)	**Yankee Stadium**	42,332	71–63
135	September 2	Red Sox	5–1	**Tanaka** (11–10)	Pomeranz (14–5)	—	**Yankee Stadium**	46,536	72–63
136	September 3	Red Sox	9–2	**Severino** (12–6)	Sale (15–7)	—	**Yankee Stadium**	46,717	73–63
137	September 4	@ Orioles	7–4	**Green** (3–0)	Bundy (13–9)	—	Oriole Park	37,622	74–63
138	September 5	@ Orioles	6–7	Britton (2–0)	**Betances** (3–6)	—	Oriole Park	14,377	74–64
—	September 6	@ Orioles	Postponed (rain). Makeup date: September 7						
139	September 7	@ Orioles	9–1	**Gray** (9–9)	Gausman (10–10)	—	Oriole Park	14,946	75–64
140	September 8	@ Rangers	5–11	Pérez (12–10)	**Tanaka** (11–11)	—	Globe Life Park	35,883	75–65
141	September 9	@ Rangers	3–1	**Robertson** (7–2)	Claudio (4–2)	**Chapman** (17)	Globe Life Park	38,135	76–65
142	September 10	@ Rangers	16–7	**Green** (4–0)	Griffin (6–6)	—	Globe Life Park	31,349	77–65
143	September 11	@ Rays	5–1	**Robertson** (8–2)	Odorizzi (8–8)	—	Citi Field (Note: Games moved to Citi Field for safety concerns due to Hurricane Irma.)	15,327	78–65
144	September 12	@ Rays	1–2	Hunter (3–5)	**Gray** (9–10)	Colomé (44)	Citi Field	21,024	78–66
145	September 13	@ Rays	3–2	**Green** (5–0)	Archer (9–10)	**Chapman** (18)	Citi Field	13,159	79–66
146	September 14	Orioles	13–5	**Tanaka** (12–11)	Miley (8–13)	—	**Yankee Stadium**	37,128	80–66
147	September 15	Orioles	8–2	**Severino** (13–6)	Ynoa (1–2)	—	**Yankee Stadium**	40,460	81–66
148	September 16	Orioles	9–3	**Montgomery** (8–7)	Hellickson (8–10)	—	**Yankee Stadium**	40,114	82–66
149	September 17	Orioles	4–6	Jiménez (6–10)	**Gray** (9–11)	Britton (15)	**Yankee Stadium**	38,189	82–67
150	September 18	Twins	2–1	**Robertson** (9–2)	Santana (15–8)	**Chapman** (19)	**Yankee Stadium**	30,425	83–67
151	September 19	Twins	5–2	**Sabathia** (12–5)	Berríos (12–8)	**Chapman** (20)	**Yankee Stadium**	30,218	84–67
152	September 20	Twins	11–3	**Shreve** (4–1)	Colón (6–14)	—	**Yankee Stadium**	30,099	85–67
153	September 22	@ Blue Jays	1–8	Estrada (10–8)	**Tanaka** (12–12)	—	Rogers Centre	42,153	85–68
154	September 23	@ Blue Jays	5–1	**Gray** (10–11)	Biagini (3–12)	—	Rogers Centre	46,949	86–68
155	September 24	@ Blue Jays	5–9	Stroman (13–8)	**García** (5–10)	—	Rogers Centre	47,394	86–69
156	September 25	Royals	11–3	**Sabathia** (13–5)	Junis (8–3)	—	**Yankee Stadium**	40,023	87–69
157	September 26	Rays	6–1	**Montgomery** (9–7)	Snell (4–7)	—	**Yankee Stadium**	30,434	88–69
158	September 27	Rays	6–1	**Severino** (14–6)	Andriese (5–5)	—	**Yankee Stadium**	30,549	89–69
159	September 28	Rays	6–9	Hu (1–1)	**Gray** (10–12)	—	**Yankee Stadium**	32,933	89–70
160	September 29	Blue Jays	4–0	**Tanaka** (13–12)	Biagini (3–13)	**Chapman** (21)	**Yankee Stadium**	35,735	90–70
161	September 30	Blue Jays	2–1	**Sabathia** (14–5)	Stroman (13–9)	**Chapman** (22)	**Yankee Stadium**	39,457	91–70
162	October 1	Blue Jays	1–2	Barnes (3–6)	**German** (0–1)	Osuna (39)	**Yankee Stadium**	37,428	91–71

== Player stats ==
=== Batting ===
Note: G = Games played; AB = At bats; R = Runs; H = Hits; 2B = Doubles; 3B = Triples; HR = Home runs; RBI = Runs batted in; SB = Stolen bases; BB = Walks; AVG = Batting average; SLG = Slugging average

Player	G	AB	R	H	2B	3B	HR	RBI	SB	BB	AVG	SLG
Brett Gardner	151	594	96	157	26	4	21	63	23	72	.264	.428
Aaron Judge	155	542	128	154	24	3	52	114	9	127	.284	.627
Didi Gregorius	136	534	73	153	27	0	25	87	3	25	.287	.478
Chase Headley	147	512	77	140	30	1	12	61	9	60	.273	.406
Gary Sánchez	122	471	79	131	20	0	33	90	2	40	.278	.531
Starlin Castro	112	443	66	133	18	1	16	63	2	23	.300	.454
Matt Holliday	105	373	50	86	18	0	19	64	1	46	.231	.432
Jacoby Ellsbury	112	356	65	94	20	4	7	39	22	41	.264	.402
Ronald Torreyes	108	315	35	92	15	1	3	36	2	11	.292	.375
Aaron Hicks	88	301	54	80	18	0	15	52	10	51	.266	.475
Austin Romine	80	229	19	50	9	1	2	21	0	16	.218	.293
Todd Frazier	66	194	33	43	4	1	11	32	0	35	.222	.423
Chris Carter	62	184	20	37	5	1	8	26	0	20	.201	.370
Greg Bird	48	147	20	28	7	0	9	28	0	19	.190	.422
Clint Frazier	39	134	16	31	9	4	4	17	1	7	.231	.448
Tyler Wade	30	58	7	9	4	0	0	2	1	5	.155	.224
Garrett Cooper	13	43	3	14	5	1	0	6	0	1	.326	.488
Tyler Austin	20	40	4	9	2	0	2	8	0	4	.225	.425
Rob Refsnyder	20	37	3	5	1	1	0	0	2	3	.135	.216
Kyle Higashioka	9	18	2	0	0	0	0	0	0	2	.000	.000
Mason Williams	5	16	3	4	0	0	0	1	2	1	.250	.250
Ji-man Choi	6	15	2	4	1	0	2	5	0	2	.267	.733
Pete Kozma	11	9	2	1	0	0	0	0	0	1	.111	.111
Miguel Andújar	5	7	0	4	2	0	0	4	1	1	.571	.857
Erik Kratz	4	2	0	2	1	0	0	2	0	0	1.000	1.500
Dustin Fowler	1	0	0	0	0	0	0	0	0	0	.---	.---
Pitcher totals	162	20	1	2	0	0	0	0	0	3	.100	.100
Team totals	162	5594	858	1463	266	23	241	821	90	616	.262	.447

=== Pitching ===
Note: W = Wins; L = Losses; ERA = Earned run average; G = Games pitched; GS = Games started; SV = Saves; IP = Innings pitched; H = Hits allowed; R = Runs allowed; ER = Earned runs allowed; BB = Walks allowed; SO = Strikeouts

Player	W	L	ERA	G	GS	SV	IP	H	R	ER	BB	SO
Luis Severino	14	6	2.98	31	31	0	193.1	150	73	64	51	230
Masahiro Tanaka	13	12	4.74	30	30	0	178.0	180	100	94	41	194
Jordan Montgomery	9	7	3.88	29	29	0	155.1	140	72	67	51	144
CC Sabathia	14	5	3.69	27	27	0	148.2	139	64	61	50	120
Michael Pineda	8	4	4.39	17	17	0	96.1	103	55	47	21	92
Chad Green	5	0	1.83	40	1	0	69.0	34	14	14	17	103
Sonny Gray	4	7	3.72	11	11	0	65.1	55	31	27	27	59
Dellin Betances	3	6	2.87	66	0	10	59.2	29	20	19	44	100
Adam Warren	3	2	2.35	46	0	1	57.1	35	19	15	15	54
Aroldis Chapman	4	3	3.22	52	0	22	50.1	37	20	18	20	69
Chasen Shreve	4	1	3.77	44	0	0	45.1	35	20	19	25	58
Jonathan Holder	1	1	3.89	37	0	0	39.1	45	17	17	8	40
Jaime García	0	3	4.82	8	8	0	37.1	41	25	20	20	37
Tyler Clippard	1	5	4.95	40	0	1	36.1	28	21	20	19	42
Luis Cessa	0	3	4.75	10	5	0	36.0	36	21	19	17	30
David Robertson	5	0	1.03	30	0	1	35.0	14	4	4	12	51
Bryan Mitchell	1	1	5.79	20	1	1	32.2	42	24	21	13	17
Tommy Kahnle	1	1	2.70	32	0	0	26.2	25	8	8	10	36
Giovanny Gallegos	0	1	4.87	16	0	0	20.1	21	12	11	5	22
Caleb Smith	0	1	7.71	9	2	0	18.2	21	16	16	10	18
Domingo Germán	0	1	3.14	7	0	0	14.1	11	6	5	4	18
Tommy Layne	0	0	7.62	19	0	0	13.0	16	12	11	8	9
Ben Heller	1	0	0.82	9	0	0	11.0	5	1	1	6	9
Tyler Webb	0	0	4.50	7	0	0	6.0	3	3	3	4	5
Ronald Herrera	0	1	6.00	2	0	0	3.0	3	2	2	1	3
Team totals	91	71	3.72	162	162	36	1448.2	1248	660	599	504	1560

== Postseason ==
=== Game log ===
2017 Postseason game log (7−6 (Home 6−0; Away 1−6))
American League Wild Card Game: 1−0

#	Date	Opponent	Stadium	Score	Win	Loss	Save	Attendance	Record
1	October 3	Twins	Yankee Stadium	8–4	Robertson (1–0)	Berríos (0–1)	—	49,280	1–0

American League Division Series: 3−2 (Home 2−0; Away 1−2)

#	Date	Opponent	Stadium	Score	Win	Loss	Save	Attendance	Record
1	October 5	@ Indians	Progressive Field	0–4	Bauer (1–0)	Gray (0–1)	Allen (1)	37,612	0–1
2	October 6	@ Indians	Progressive Field	8–9 (13)	Tomlin (1–0)	Betances (0–1)	–	37,681	0–2
3	October 8	Indians	Yankee Stadium	1–0	Tanaka (1–0)	Miller (0–1)	Chapman (1)	48,614	1–2
4	October 9	Indians	Yankee Stadium	7–3	Severino (1–0)	Bauer (1–1)	Kahnle (1)	47,316	2–2
5	October 11	@ Indians	Progressive Field	5–2	Robertson (1–0)	Kluber (0–1)	Chapman (2)	37,802	3–2

American League Championship Series: 3−4 (Home 3−0; Away 0−4)

#	Date	Opponent	Stadium	Score	Win	Loss	Save	Attendance	Record
1	October 13	@ Astros	Minute Maid Park	1–2	Keuchel (1–0)	Tanaka (0–1)	Giles (1)	43,116	0–1
2	October 14	@ Astros	Minute Maid Park	1–2	Verlander (1–0)	Chapman (0–1)	–	43,193	0–2
3	October 16	Astros	Yankee Stadium	8–1	Sabathia (1–0)	Morton (0–1)	–	49,373	1–2
4	October 17	Astros	Yankee Stadium	6–4	Green (1–0)	Giles (0–1)	Chapman (1)	48,804	2–2
5	October 18	Astros	Yankee Stadium	5–0	Tanaka (1–1)	Keuchel (1–1)	–	49,647	3–2
6	October 20	@ Astros	Minute Maid Park	1–7	Verlander (2–0)	Severino (0–1)	–	43,179	3–3
7	October 21	@ Astros	Minute Maid Park	0–4	Morton (1–1)	Sabathia (1–1)	McCullers (1)	43,201	3–4

=== Postseason rosters ===
Playoff rosters
American League Wild Card Game

- Pitchers: 30 David Robertson 40 Luis Severino 43 Adam Warren 45 Chasen Shreve 48 Tommy Kahnle 52 CC Sabathia 54 Aroldis Chapman 55 Sonny Gray 57 Chad Green 68 Dellin Betances
- Catchers: 24 Gary Sánchez 27 Austin Romine
- Infielders: 14 Starlin Castro 18 Didi Gregorius 29 Todd Frazier 33 Greg Bird 39 Tyler Wade 74 Ronald Torreyes
- Outfielders: 11 Brett Gardner 22 Jacoby Ellsbury 31 Aaron Hicks 77 Clint Frazier 99 Aaron Judge
- Designated hitters: 12 Chase Headley 17 Matt Holliday

American League Division Series

- Pitchers: 19 Masahiro Tanaka 30 David Robertson 34 Jaime García 40 Luis Severino 43 Adam Warren 47 Jordan Montgomery 48 Tommy Kahnle 52 CC Sabathia 54 Aroldis Chapman 55 Sonny Gray 57 Chad Green 68 Dellin Betances
- Catchers: 24 Gary Sánchez 27 Austin Romine
- Infielders: 14 Starlin Castro 18 Didi Gregorius 29 Todd Frazier 33 Greg Bird 74 Ronald Torreyes
- Outfielders: 11 Brett Gardner 22 Jacoby Ellsbury 31 Aaron Hicks 99 Aaron Judge
- Designated hitters: 12 Chase Headley 17 Matt Holliday

American League Championship Series

- Pitchers: 19 Masahiro Tanaka 30 David Robertson 34 Jaime García 40 Luis Severino 43 Adam Warren 47 Jordan Montgomery 48 Tommy Kahnle 52 CC Sabathia 54 Aroldis Chapman 55 Sonny Gray 57 Chad Green 68 Dellin Betances
- Catchers: 24 Gary Sánchez 27 Austin Romine
- Infielders: 14 Starlin Castro 18 Didi Gregorius 29 Todd Frazier 33 Greg Bird 74 Ronald Torreyes
- Outfielders: 11 Brett Gardner 22 Jacoby Ellsbury 31 Aaron Hicks 99 Aaron Judge
- Designated hitters: 12 Chase Headley 17 Matt Holliday

== Farm system ==
Level	Team	League	Manager
AAA	Scranton/Wilkes-Barre RailRiders	International League	Al Pedrique
AA	Trenton Thunder	Eastern League	Bobby Mitchell
A	Tampa Yankees	Florida State League	Jay Bell
A	Charleston RiverDogs	South Atlantic League	Pat Osborn
A-Short Season	Staten Island Yankees	New York–Penn League	Julio Mosquera
Rookie	Pulaski Yankees	Appalachian League	Luis Dorante
Rookie	GCL Yankees 1	Gulf Coast League	Nick Ortiz
Rookie	GCL Yankees 2	Gulf Coast League	Luis Sojo
Rookie	DSL Yankees 1	Dominican Summer League	
Rookie	DSL Yankees 2	Dominican Summer League	
