= Jason Brown (baseball) =

American baseball player & coach (born 1974)

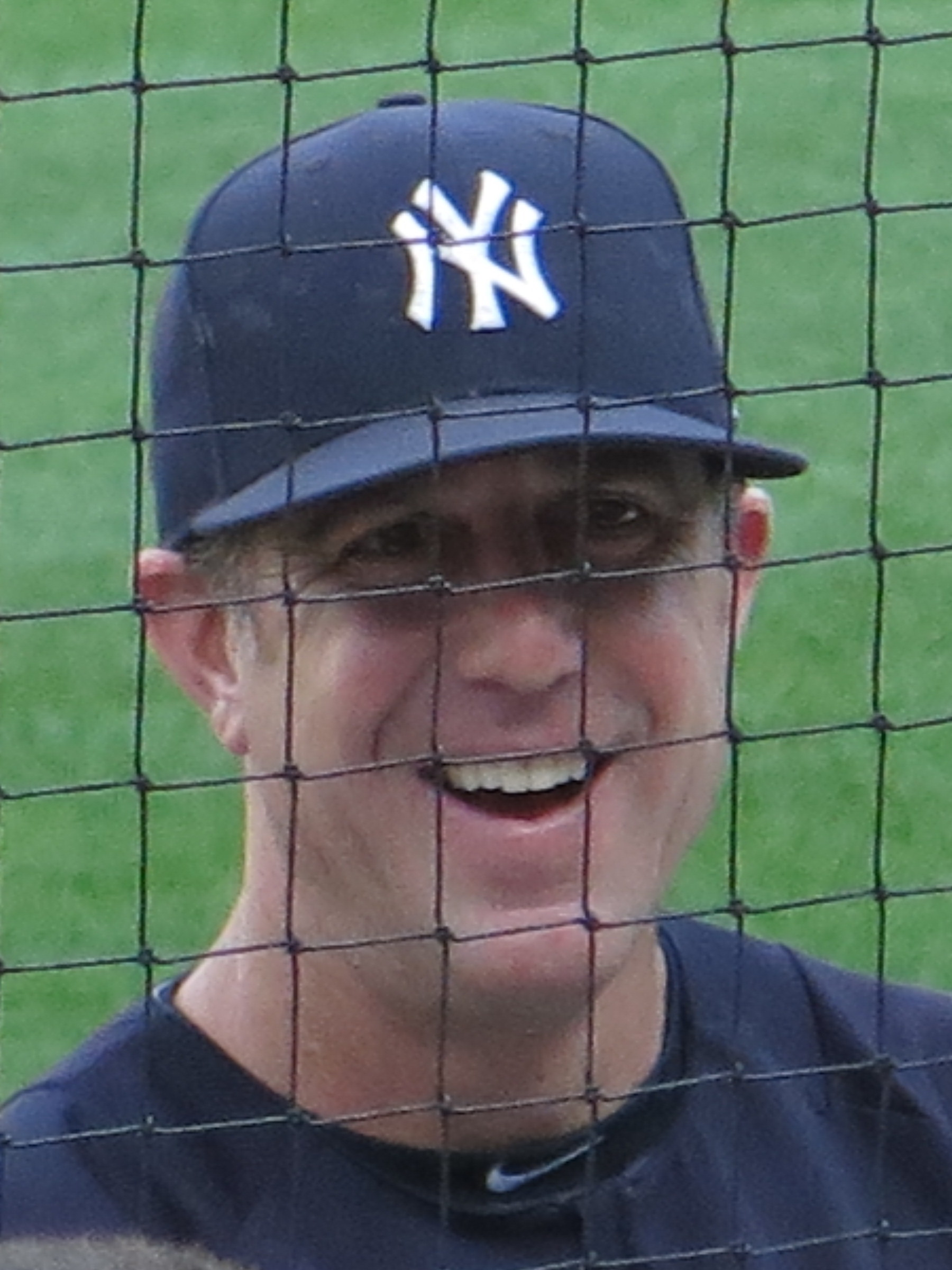
- Brown with the Yankees in 2017

Los Angeles Angels – No. 93
- Catcher / Outfielder / First baseman / Coach
- Born: May 22, 1974 (age 51); Long Beach, California, U.S.
- Bats: Right Throws: Right

Teams
- As Coach: New York Yankees (2017–2019); Los Angeles Angels (2020–present)

Jason Alan Brown (born May 22, 1974) is an American professional baseball coach. He was the former catching coach for the New York Yankees of Major League Baseball (MLB). He is currently the catching coach for the Los Angeles Angels of Major League Baseball (MLB).

== Career ==
Brown attended the University of Southern California (USC), where he played college baseball for the USC Trojans. From 2009 to 2014, Brown served as assistant coach of the Orleans Firebirds of the Cape Cod Baseball League. He served as an assistant coach at USC in 2012. In 2015, he was the hitting coach for the Gulf Coast Yankees. He served as the bullpen coach for the Scranton/Wilkes-Barre RailRiders, and as a coaching assistant for the New York Yankees. He was named the Yankees' catching coach before the 2018 season.
