= Jonathan Holder =

American baseball player (born 1993)

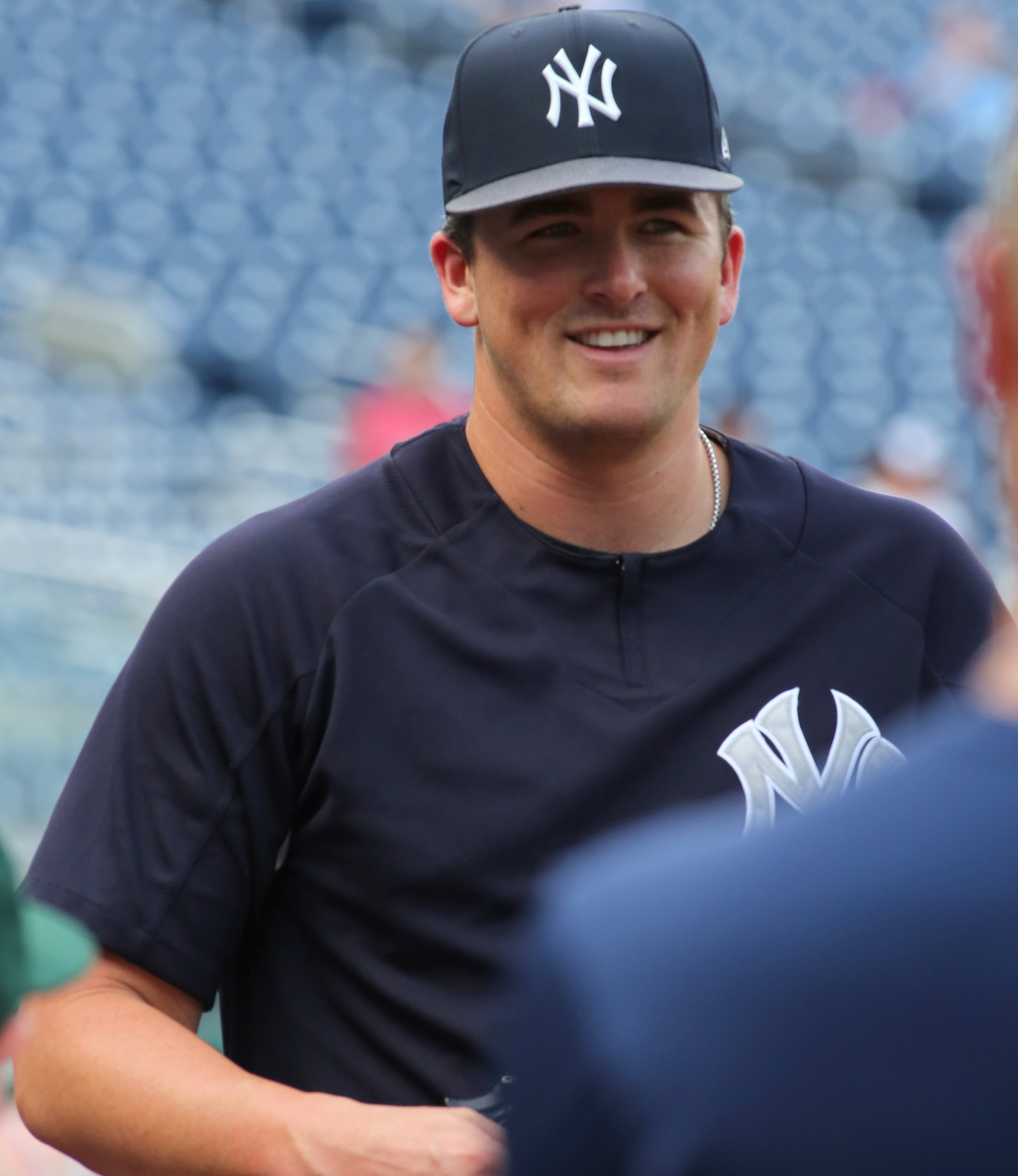
- Holder with the New York Yankees
- Pitcher
- Born: June 9, 1993 (age 33); Gulfport, Mississippi, U.S.
- Batted: Right Threw: Right

MLB debut
- September 2, 2016, for the New York Yankees

Last MLB appearance
- September 27, 2020, for the New York Yankees

MLB statistics
- Win–loss record: 10–6
- Earned run average: 4.38
- Strikeouts: 165
- Stats at Baseball Reference

Teams
- New York Yankees (2016–2020)

Jonathan Blake Holder (born June 9, 1993) is an American former professional baseball pitcher. He played in Major League Baseball (MLB) for the New York Yankees.

== Career ==
=== Amateur ===
Holder attended Gulfport High School in Gulfport, Mississippi, where he was an accomplished hitter and pitcher. He attended Mississippi State University, where he played college baseball for the Mississippi State Bulldogs from 2012 to 2014 and served as the team's closer. During his career he had an 11–2 record, 1.59 earned run average (ERA), 191 strikeouts and a school record 37 saves. In 2012, he played collegiate summer baseball with the Wareham Gatemen of the Cape Cod Baseball League.

=== New York Yankees ===
The New York Yankees selected Holder in the sixth round of the 2014 Major League Baseball draft. After pitching in relief in college, the Yankees converted him into a starting pitcher. He made his professional debut in 2014 with the Gulf Coast Yankees of the Rookie-level Gulf Coast League and later played for the Staten Island Yankees of the Low–A New York-Penn League. He started 2015 with the Tampa Yankees of the High–A Florida State League. He posted a 7–6 record with a 2.52 ERA and was a Mid-Season All-Star.

In 2016, he was moved back to the bullpen, where he said his velocity improved. He began the season with Tampa but was soon promoted to the Trenton Thunder of the Double–A Eastern League. On April 26, 2016, Holder pitched the final inning of a joint no hitter that was started by Ronald Herrera. He was an Eastern League Mid-Season All-Star. The Yankees then promoted Holder to the Scranton/Wilkes-Barre RailRiders of the Triple–A International League. He struck out 12 batters over four innings on August 28, which earned him Pitcher of the Week honors. He was also named the best relief pitcher and was an organization All-Star, according to MiLB.com.

The Yankees promoted Holder to the major leagues on September 2, 2016. His first major league strikeout came against Baltimore Orioles center fielder Adam Jones, striking him out on 3 pitches. In 8 appearances with the Yankees to finish 2016, Holder had a 5.40 ERA. On May 5, 2017, Holder got his first major league win pitching a scoreless inning of relief against the Chicago Cubs. In 37 appearances out of the bullpen, Holder finished the 2017 year 1–1 with a 3.89 ERA.

In 2018, Holder made the big league team out of spring training. On August 2, 2018, Holder allowed seven runs without recording an out in a game against the Boston Red Sox. Holder became the second Yankees pitcher to ever post such a line after Bob Kammeyer did so on September 18, 1979. Holder finished the year with a solid 3.14 ERA in 66 innings pitched.

He faltered in 2019, allowing five runs, including a solo homer and a grand slam, without getting an out against the Blue Jays on June 24. After allowing 13 runs and six home runs over his past six outings, he was demoted to Triple-A. The team hoped he could improve his fastball command and the sharpness of his breaking pitches while in the minors. He returned to the majors on July 22, but went down with shoulder inflammation in August. He pitched to a 4.98 ERA in 21.2 innings during the 2020 season. On December 2, 2020, Holder was non-tendered by the Yankees.

=== Chicago Cubs ===
On December 17, 2020, Holder signed a one-year, $750,000 contract with the Chicago Cubs. He was placed on the injured list on April 1 because of a right shoulder strain. On April 26, 2021, Holder was moved to the 60-day injured list. He did not appear in a game for Chicago due to the injury and was outrighted off of the 40-man roster on November 3, 2021. He elected free agency the following day, but re-signed with the team on a minor league contract on November 19.

Holder went into 2022 as a non-roster invitee. He was reassigned to the minors on April 4. After starting the year on the injured list, Holder was again transferred to the 60-day injured list in May. Following a rehab assignment with the rookie–level Arizona Complex League Cubs, he was finally activated on August 4. He then spent the remainder of the season with the Triple–A Iowa Cubs, making 14 appearances and struggling to a 10.00 ERA with 19 strikeouts in 18.0 innings pitched. He elected free agency following the season on November 10, 2022.

=== Los Angeles Angels ===
On November 29, 2022, Holder signed a minor league deal with the Los Angeles Angels. He competed in spring training but was reassigned to minor league camp on March 22, 2023. In 46 appearances for the Triple–A Salt Lake Bees, Holder recorded a 5.40 ERA with 76 strikeouts and 2 saves across 66 2/3 innings of work. He elected free agency following the season on November 6.

=== Texas Rangers ===
On January 10, 2024, Holder signed a minor league contract with the Texas Rangers. He was released by the Rangers organization on March 27.
