= Ronald Torreyes =

Venezuelan baseball player (born 1992)

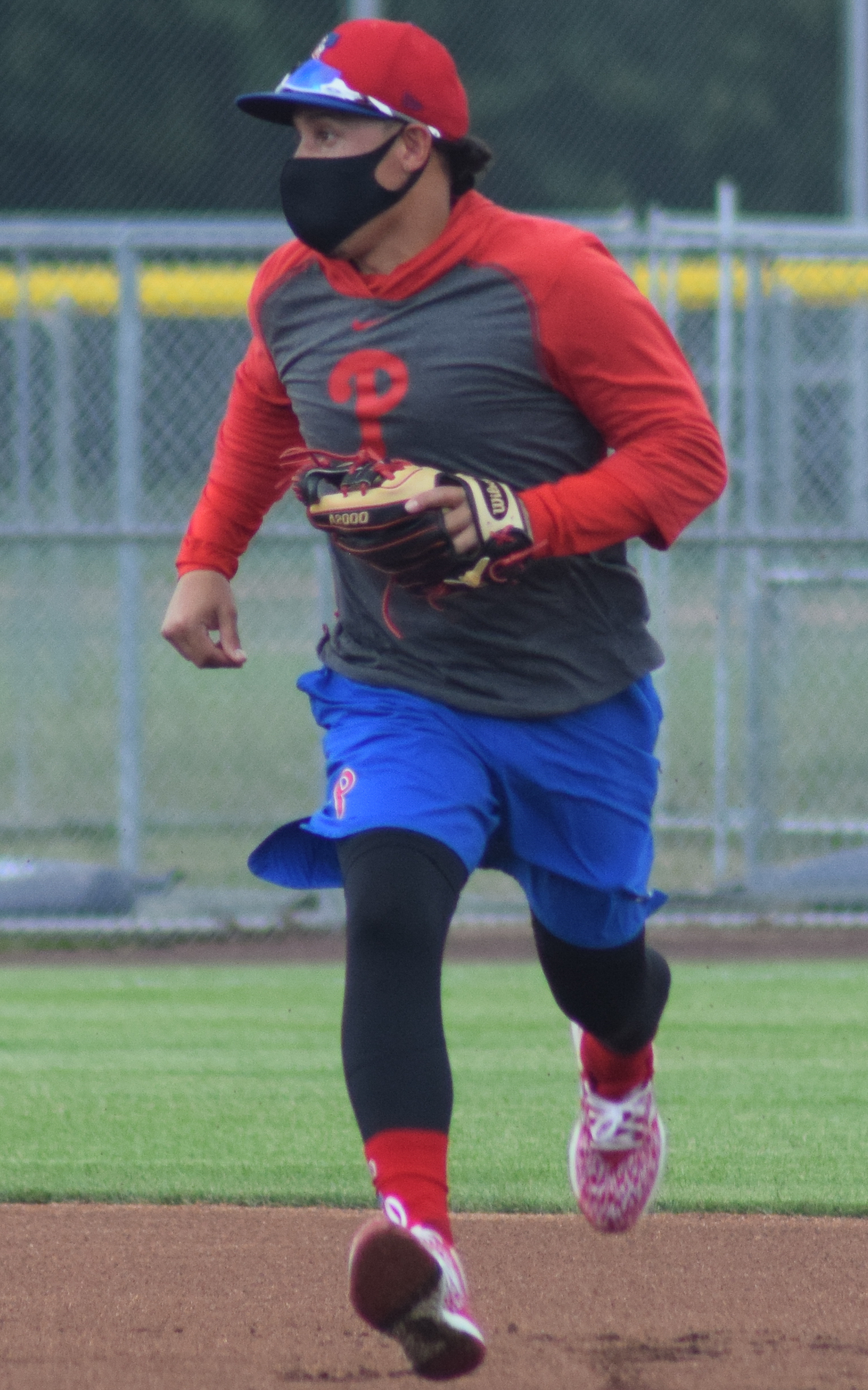
- Torreyes with the Philadelphia Phillies in 2020
- Infielder
- Born: September 2, 1992 (age 34); Barinas, Barinas, Venezuela
- Batted: Right Threw: Right

MLB debut
- September 13, 2015, for the Los Angeles Dodgers

Last MLB appearance
- October 3, 2021, for the Philadelphia Phillies

MLB statistics
- Batting average: .265
- Home runs: 11
- Runs batted in: 98
- Stats at Baseball Reference

Teams
- Los Angeles Dodgers (2015); New York Yankees (2016–2018); Minnesota Twins (2019); Philadelphia Phillies (2020–2021)

Ronald Alcides Torreyes (born September 2, 1992) is a Venezuelan former professional baseball infielder. He played in Major League Baseball (MLB) for the Los Angeles Dodgers, New York Yankees, Minnesota Twins, and Philadelphia Phillies.

Torreyes began playing baseball at a young age in Barinas, Venezuela, after watching his father play. He was ignored by several MLB teams on account of his small frame, but signed with the Cincinnati Reds in 2010. Torreyes played for several minor league affiliates of the Reds, Chicago Cubs, Houston Astros, and Toronto Blue Jays before he was traded to the Dodgers in 2015. Torreyes made his MLB debut for the Dodgers that September, filling in for an injured Jose Peraza. He underwent another series of transactions at the start of 2016 before settling with the Yankees as a backup infielder. Torreyes was used sparingly until 2017, when a shoulder injury to Didi Gregorius saw him start at shortstop for the first month of the season. When Greg Bird returned to the lineup in 2018, however, Torreyes lost his place on the Yankees roster.

After playing one minor-league season with the Twins, Torreyes signed with the Phillies for a 2020 season that was impacted by the COVID-19 pandemic. The pandemic continued to affect Torreyes in 2021, as he tested positive for the virus and had to miss a month of the season. Upon his return, he found a steady role with the club as a utility player on a roster that had been depleted by injury and illness. After a demotion to the minor league roster in 2022, Torreyes left the organization.

== Early life ==
Torreyes was born on September 2, 1992, in Barinas, Barinas, Venezuela. His father Alcides, a construction worker, would play third base and center field for an amateur baseball team in Venezuela, and Torreyes learned the game by watching his father play. He began playing baseball at the age of four, for the Compoticas or Semellitas ("Little Seeds") league, and began representing the Venezuela national baseball team in international competitions from the age of seven. Torreyes spent seven years on the Venezuelan national team, and by adolescence, he hoped to break into professional baseball. To prepare, he would do conditioning drills with his father and watch videos of Omar Vizquel, a famous Venezuelan shortstop.

== Career ==
=== Minor league career (2010–2015) ===
==== Cincinnati Reds (2010–2013) ====
Although many Major League Baseball (MLB) teams passed over Torreyes due to his small frame, the Cincinnati Reds signed him as an international free agent in February 2010. He began playing for the Reds' Venezuelan Summer League (VSL) affiliate, where he won the league batting title with a .390 average. Torreyes also led the VSL with a .606 slugging percentage, 34 extra-base hits, 56 runs scored, 10 triples, 94 hits, and 146 total bases. After the VSL season ended, he was promoted to the Arizona League Reds, with whom he hit .349. Torreyes joined the Class A Dayton Dragons at the end of the 2010 Minor League Baseball season, and continued to play with them in 2011. He served as the team's starting second baseman, as well as the second batter in the order, behind Billy Hamilton. Torreyes and Hamilton, both known for their speed on the bases, combined to provide a strong offensive start to the Dragons throughout the 2011 Midwest League season. In 67 games that year, Torreyes batted .356, with 41 runs batted in (RBIs) and 12 stolen bases.

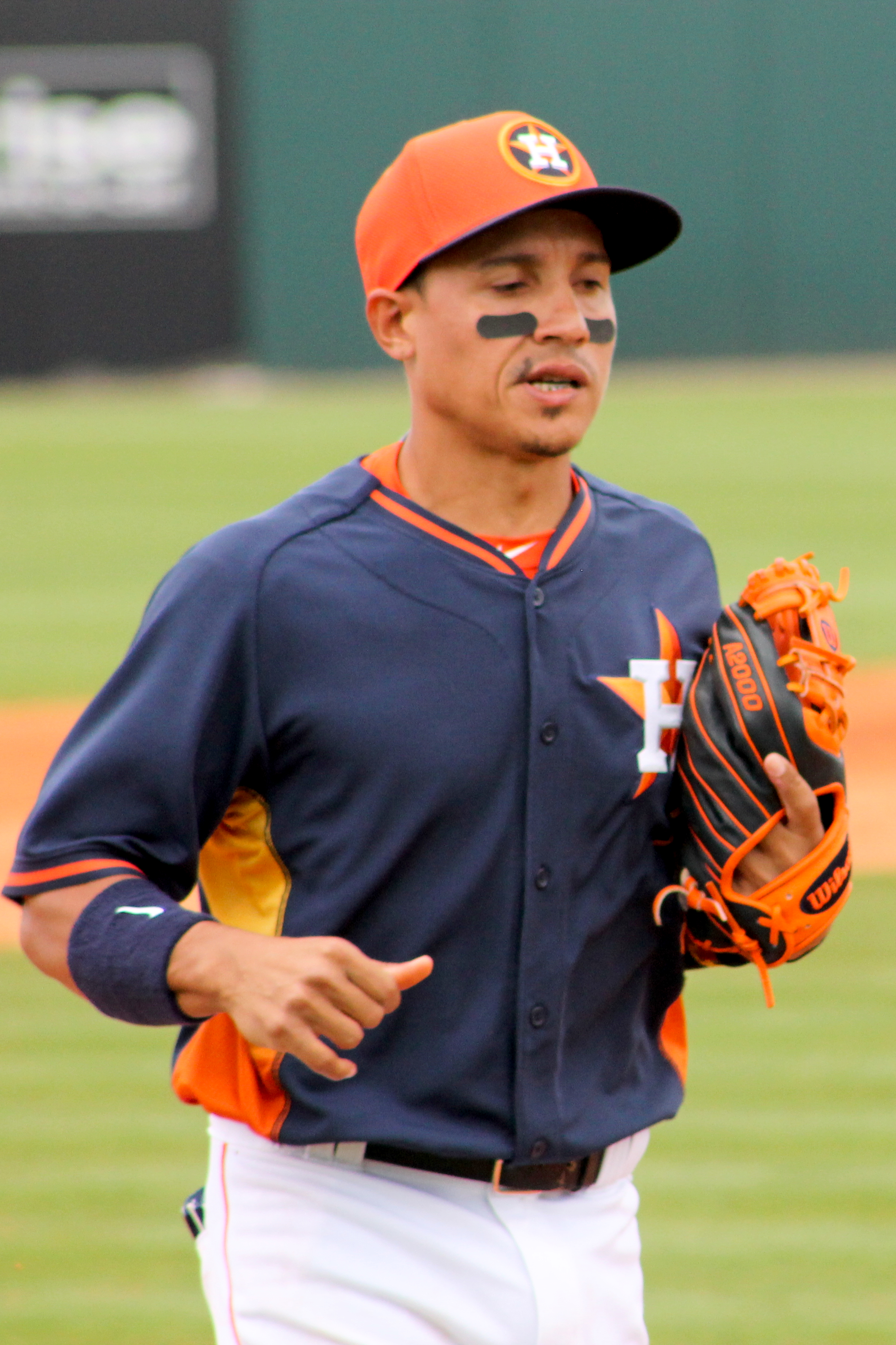
Torreyes with the Astros during spring training in 2015

On December 23, 2011, the Reds traded Torreyes, Travis Wood, and Dave Sappelt to the Chicago Cubs in exchange for left-handed relief pitcher Sean Marshall. He spent the 2012 season with the Class A-Advanced Daytona Cubs, batting .264 in 115 games and 474 plate appearances, with six home runs, 47 RBIs, and 62 runs scored. The following season, he was promoted to the Double-A Tennessee Smokies. On April 25, 2013, Torreyes fell one home run short of hitting for the cycle in a 2–1 victory over the Pensacola Blue Wahoos. in addition to scoring a single, double, and triple in the game, Torreyes drew a walk and scored a run, going 3-for-3. Torreyes batted .260 for the Smokies in 223 at bats, with 13 doubles, four triples, two home runs, and 25 RBIs.

==== Houston Astros (2013–2014) ====
On July 3, 2013, the Cubs traded Torreyes to the Houston Astros in exchange for two international signing bonus slots, one of which was used to acquire third-ranked international prospect Gleyber Torres in the international signing period. He spent the remainder of the season with the Double-A Corpus Christi Hooks, batting .278 in 28 games, with 12 RBIs and 19 runs in 162 plate appearances. Torreyes was promoted to the Triple-A Oklahoma City RedHawks for the 2014 season, where he established himself as a strong bat for the Pacific Coast League. By August 23, 2014, Torreyes had the second-lowest strikeout rate in the minor leagues, averaging one strikeout for every 20.9 plate appearances, and at one point boasting a streak of 90 plate appearances without striking out. By that same point in the season, he had compiled 34 multi-hit games, including 12 games of three hits or more. Torreyes batted .298 for the year, with two home runs, 46 RBIs, and 65 runs in 126 games for Oklahoma City, and 26 strikeouts in 519 plate appearances.

==== Toronto Blue Jays (2015) ====
Torreyes opened the 2015 season with the Triple-A Fresno Grizzlies, putting up five RBIs and seven runs in 19 games. On May 15, 2015, the Astros traded Torreyes to the Toronto Blue Jays in exchange for cash or a player to be named later. The Blue Jays assigned him to the Double-A New Hampshire Fisher Cats, where he batted .140 in 16 games.

=== Los Angeles Dodgers (2015) ===
On June 12, 2015, the Blue Jays traded Torreyes to the Los Angeles Dodgers in exchange for cash considerations. He was subsequently assigned to the Double-A Tulsa Drillers. Torreyes made an immediate impact as the third baseman and leadoff hitter for Tulsa, batting .298 with four home runs and 17 RBIs in 52 games before he was promoted to the Triple-A Oklahoma City Dodgers on August 11. Torreyes made his MLB debut on September 13, 2015, filling in for an injured Jose Peraza in a 4–3 victory over the Arizona Diamondbacks. He was used sparingly by the club throughout the remainder of the season, appearing in only eight games and collecting two hits in six at-bats. Torreyes was designated for assignment by the Dodgers on January 12, 2016.

=== New York Yankees (2016–2018) ===
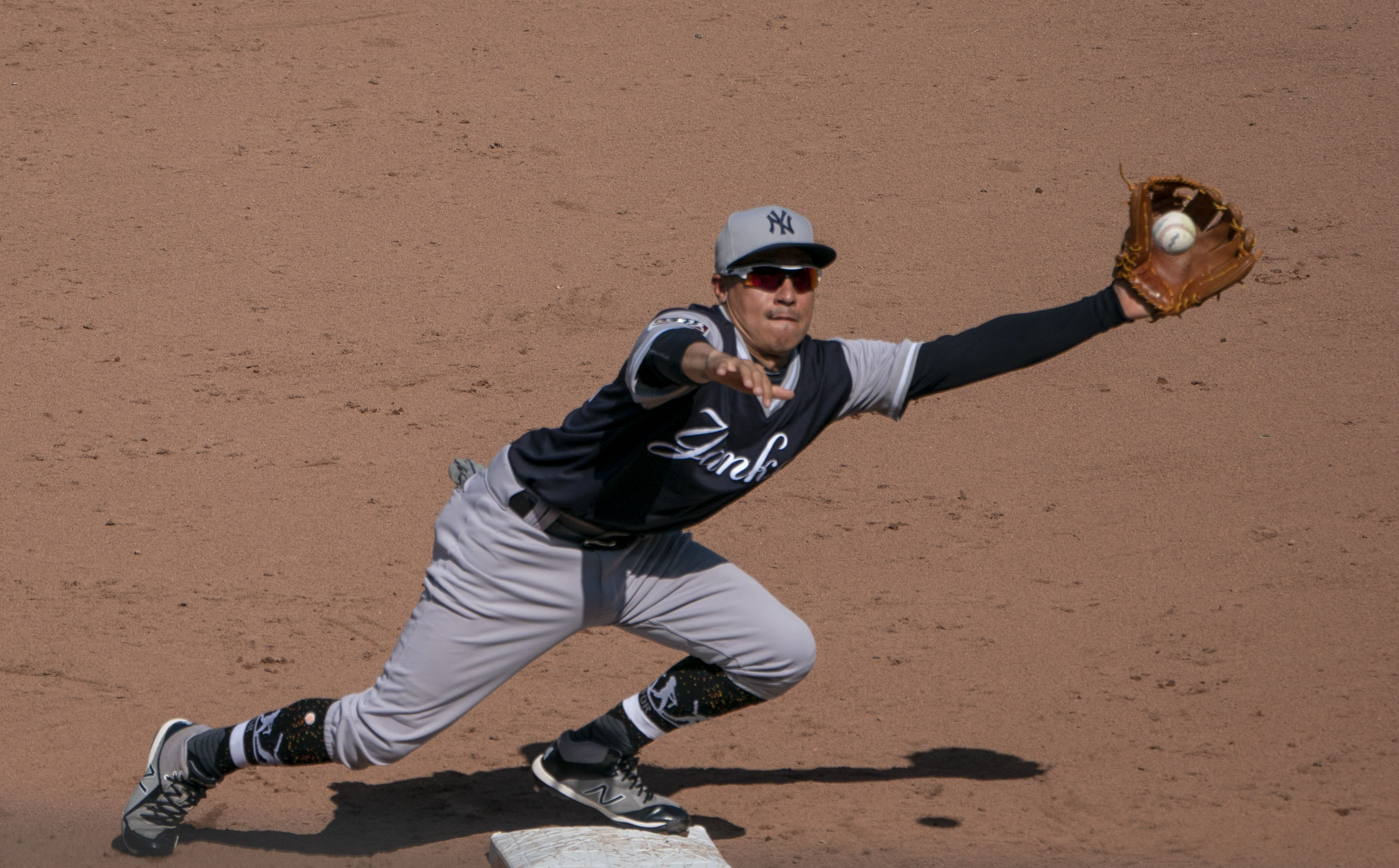
Torreyes with the Yankees in 2018

Between April 9, 2015, and March 31, 2016, Torreyes was a part of 15 MLB transactions. On January 12, 2016, Torreyes and left-handed pitcher Tyler Olson were both acquired by the New York Yankees in exchange for either cash or a player to be named later. Three days later, the Yankees designated Torreyes for assignment to make room for Lane Adams, who they had acquired from the Kansas City Royals via waivers. On January 25, the Los Angeles Angels of Anaheim claimed Torreyes from the Yankees off of waivers, only to designate him for assignment two days later. On February 1, the Yankees reclaimed Torreyes from the Angels off of waivers, and designated Adams for assignment to clear room on the 40-man roster.

On March 30, 2016, the Yankees announced that Torreyes had beaten Pete Kozma as the team's backup infielder, and that he would see time at second base, shortstop, and third base throughout the season. Only 23 years old at the time, Torreyes was the second-youngest player on the team, behind the 21-year-old Luis Severino, and quickly established himself as a reliable hitter on the team. While the three other bench players had a combined two singles in 23 at-bats by mid-April, Torreyes started the season batting .667 with a double, a triple, and two RBIs. He played only sparingly for most of the summer, with 85 plate appearances in the first 120 games of the season, but received more starting opportunities by mid-August, at one point going 14-for-26 in a two-week span. Torreyes scored his first major league home run on August 19, a solo shot in a 7–0 win over the Angels. He appeared in a total of 72 games for the Yankees in 2016, batting .258 with 12 RBIs and 20 runs.

With Didi Gregorius sidelined due to a shoulder injury in the preseason, Torreyes was called upon to serve as the Yankees' opening day shortstop for the start of the 2017 season. On April 4, he hit the team's first home run of the year, a two-run shot off of Jake Odorizzi of the Tampa Bay Rays. When Gregorius returned from the injury, Torreyes continued to fill in at other positions, spending some time at third base and taking over for Starlin Castro both times that the other infielder went on the disabled list with a hamstring injury. Torreyes saw the most major league playing time in 2017, batting .292 with three home runs and 36 RBIs in 108 games and 336 plate appearances.

Torreyes' performance as a utility player in 2017 impressed manager Aaron Boone, who intended to use the player throughout the 2018 season as a temporary replacement for players who were struggling. On May 26, however, first baseman Greg Bird returned to the lineup after recovering from a preseason ankle surgery, and in order to clear room for him on the roster, Torreyes was optioned to the Triple-A Scranton/Wilkes-Barre RailRiders. Torreyes kept an optimistic attitude towards being sent to the minors, even when he missed most of the month of July to help his wife through an unspecified medical issue. He spent most of the season with Scranton/Wilkes-Barre, but made 100 at-bats in 41 games for the Yankees, batting .280 with seven RBIs in the process.

On November 26, 2018, the Yankees designated Torreyes for assignment to make room for Parker Bridwell, who they had claimed off of waivers from the Angels. Two days later, the Yankees traded Torreyes to the Chicago Cubs in exchange for cash considerations or a player to be named later. The Cubs chose not to tender a contract to Torreyes, leaving him a free agent.

=== Minnesota Twins (2019) ===
On December 6, 2018, the Minnesota Twins signed Torreyes and second baseman Jonathan Schoop to one-year contracts, with Torreyes expected to back up Ehire Adrianza, the Twins' other utility infielder. He instead opened the season with the Triple-A Rochester Red Wings as one of several veteran free agent infielders meant to bolster a team that had finished the previous season 64–76. Torreyes spent the bulk of the 2019 season with Rochester, batting .256 with 11 home runs, 42 RBIs, and 48 runs in 79 games, and also made a brief appearance with the Class A Fort Myers Mighty Mussels. He was promoted to the 40-man roster on September 10, after outfielder Byron Buxton was placed on the 60-day injured list with a subluxation of the left shoulder. On September 17, Torreyes helped the Twins beat the Chicago White Sox in extra innings with a walk-in, walk-off hit by pitch, taking the final score to 9–8. On October 28, after appearing in seven games for the Twins, Torreyes was outrighted off of the 40-man roster so that Minnesota could protect more prospects from the upcoming Rule 5 draft.

=== Philadelphia Phillies (2020–2022) ===
The Philadelphia Phillies signed Torreyes to a minor-league contract on January 7, 2020, with an invitation to spring training and a chance to make the final roster. The cancellation of the 2020 Minor League Baseball season due to the COVID-19 pandemic meant that certain minor league designees like Torreyes spent the season at an alternate training site in the Lehigh Valley. On September 11, 2020, Neil Walker was designated for assignment and Torreyes was called up to take his place, in order to provide what manager Joe Girardi called "more defensive flexibility" – between the utility players, Torreyes had more experience at shortstop and center field, where the Phillies had been falling short. The selection was short-lived: Torreyes went 1-for-7 before being designated for assignment on September 15. He cleared waivers and was outrighted to Lehigh Valley.

On December 4, 2020, Torreyes signed another minor-league deal with the Phillies. After Scott Kingery was optioned to the minors on March 29, Torreyes was officially named to the Phillies' opening day roster. After making five plate appearances in the first 15 games of the 2021 season, Torreyes spent nearly a month on the COVID-19 injured list; he had tested positive for the virus, but was asymptomatic, and when he returned to the lineup on May 18, Torreyes scored his first RBI hit since 2018. He followed this performance with his first home run in four years on June 1, 2021, in the Phillies' 17–3 rout of the Cincinnati Reds. Torreyes continued to excel both offensively and defensively as the Phillies season progressed, filling in for Didi Gregorius and Alec Bohm when the infielders were sidelined with injury and illness. He started in 31 out of 46 games between his return from the COVID-19 list and the MLB All-Star Game break, batting .270 in that span with three home runs and 18 RBIs. He finished the season batting .242 in 111 games, with seven home runs and 41 RBIs in 318 at bats. Torreyes split time among a number of positions, with 50 appearances at third base, 44 at shortstop, 11 at second base, one in center field, and two pitching appearances. On November 5, Torreyes was one of six Phillies outrighted off of the 40-man roster who opted for free agency rather than a demotion to the Triple-A Lehigh Valley IronPigs.

The Phillies signed Torreyes to a minor league contract on March 20, 2022, and he was expected to compete with Johan Camargo for a major-league roster spot. After failing to make the major league roster, Torreyes instead saw a diminished role with the IronPigs, and when Bryson Stott's demotion to Triple-A further limited his playing time, Torreyes requested and was granted his release from the organization on April 27.

== Personal life ==
Torreyes married Anarelys Melo Delgado on November 4, 2010. The couple have two sons: Moises David (b. 2013) and David Moises (b. 2019).

== See also ==
- List of Major League Baseball players from Venezuela
