= Ronald Herrera =

Venezuelan baseball player (born 1995)

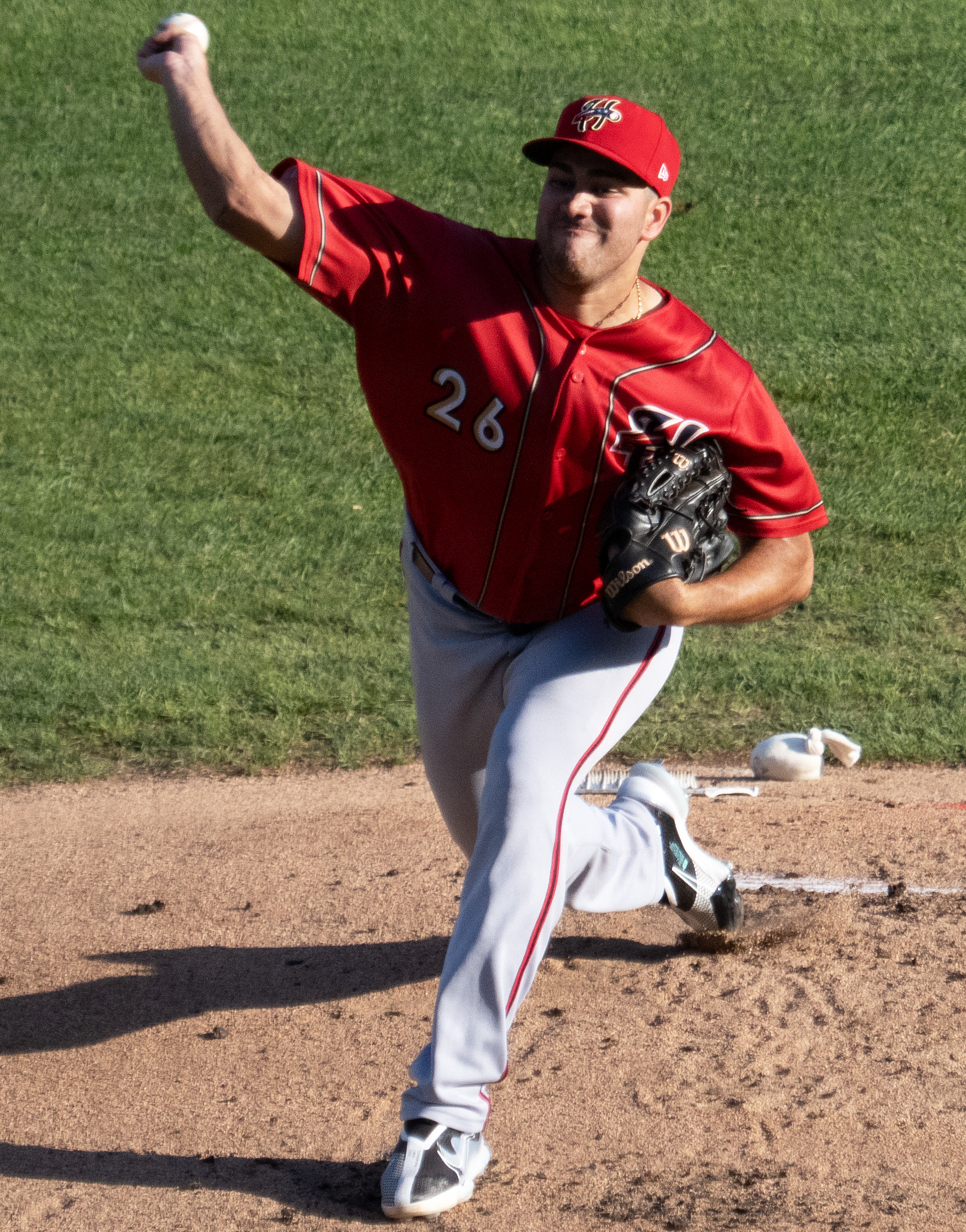
- Herrera with the Harrisburg Senators in 2022

Guerreros de Lara – No. 42
- Pitcher
- Born: May 3, 1995 (age 30); Maracay, Venezuela
- Bats: Right Throws: Right

MLB debut
- June 14, 2017, for the New York Yankees

MLB statistics (through 2017 season)
- Win–loss record: 0–1
- Earned run average: 6.00
- Strikeouts: 3
- Stats at Baseball Reference

Teams
- New York Yankees (2017)

Ronald José Herrera Aular (born May 3, 1995) is a Venezuelan professional baseball pitcher for the Guerreros de Lara of the Venezuelan Major League. He has previously played in Major League Baseball (MLB) for the New York Yankees.

== Professional career ==
=== Oakland Athletics ===
Herrera signed as an international free agent with the Oakland Athletics in December 2011. He made his professional debut in 2012 with the Rookie-level Dominican Summer League Athletics, going 2–4 with a 2.47 ERA in 58 innings. His 2013 season was split between the Rookie-level Arizona Athletics and the Low–A Vermont Lake Monsters, accumulating a 7–4 record with a 4.02 ERA in 77 innings.

=== San Diego Padres ===
On May 28, 2014, the Athletics traded Herrera and Jake Goebbert to the San Diego Padres in exchange for Kyle Blanks. He split that season between the Single–A Beloit Snappers and the Single–A Fort Wayne TinCaps, accumulating a 6–9 record with a 3.92 ERA in 132.1 innings. In 2015, he split the season between the High–A Lake Elsinore Storm and the Double-A San Antonio Missions, accumulating a 8–7 record with a 4.08 ERA in 145.2 innings.

=== New York Yankees ===
On November 11, 2015, the New York Yankees acquired Herrera from the Padres in exchange for José Pirela. His 2016 season was split between the Double-A Trenton Thunder, and the Triple-A Scranton/Wilkes-Barre RailRiders, accumulating a 10–8 record with a 3.94 ERA in 137 innings. On April 26, 2016, Herrera pitched eight innings of a joint no-hitter for the Trenton Thunder, with Jonathan Holder completing the game.

On November 19, 2016, the Yankees added Herrera to their 40-man roster to protect him from the Rule 5 draft. His 2017 season was split between the Rookie-level Gulf Coast Yankees, Trenton, and Scranton/Wilkes-Barre, accumulating a 8–1 record with a 1.91 ERA in 75 innings. He was named the Eastern League's Pitcher of the Week for June 5–11.

The Yankees promoted Herrera to the major leagues on June 14, 2017. He appeared in two major league games in 2017, recording a 0–1 record with a 6.00 ERA in 3 innings.

=== Texas Rangers ===
On November 20, 2017, the Yankees traded Herrera to the Texas Rangers in exchange for Reiver Sanmartin. Herrera missed the 2018 season with a shoulder injury, and the Rangers outrighted him off their 40-man roster following the season. Herrera started the 2019 season on the injured list with the Triple-A Nashville Sounds as he recovered from shoulder surgery. He split the season between Nashville and the Frisco RoughRiders, going a combined 3–10 with a 7.73 ERA in 79 innings. Herrera elected free agency following the season on November 4.

=== New Jersey Jackals ===
On March 2, 2021, Herrera signed with the New Jersey Jackals of the Frontier League. In 6 starts for the Jackals, Herrera compiled a 2–2 record and 4.68 ERA with 23 strikeouts across 32 2/3 innings pitched.

=== Washington Nationals ===
On February 9, 2022, Herrera signed a minor league contract with the Washington Nationals organization. He spent the year with the Double–A Harrisburg Senators, also appearing in one game for the Triple–A Rochester Red Wings. In 24 starts for Harrisburg, he registered a 5-9 record and 4.40 ERA with 114 strikeouts in 129 innings pitched. He elected free agency following the season on November 10.

On December 2, 2022, Herrera re–signed with the Nationals on a new minor league contract. He made only 5 starts for Harrisburg in 2023, recording a 4.81 ERA with 29 strikeouts across 24 1/3 innings pitched. Herrera elected free agency following the season on November 6, 2023.

=== Guerreros de Lara ===
In 2025, Herrera signed with the Guerreros de Lara of the Venezuelan Major League.
