= Adam Warren (baseball) =

American baseball pitcher (born 1987)

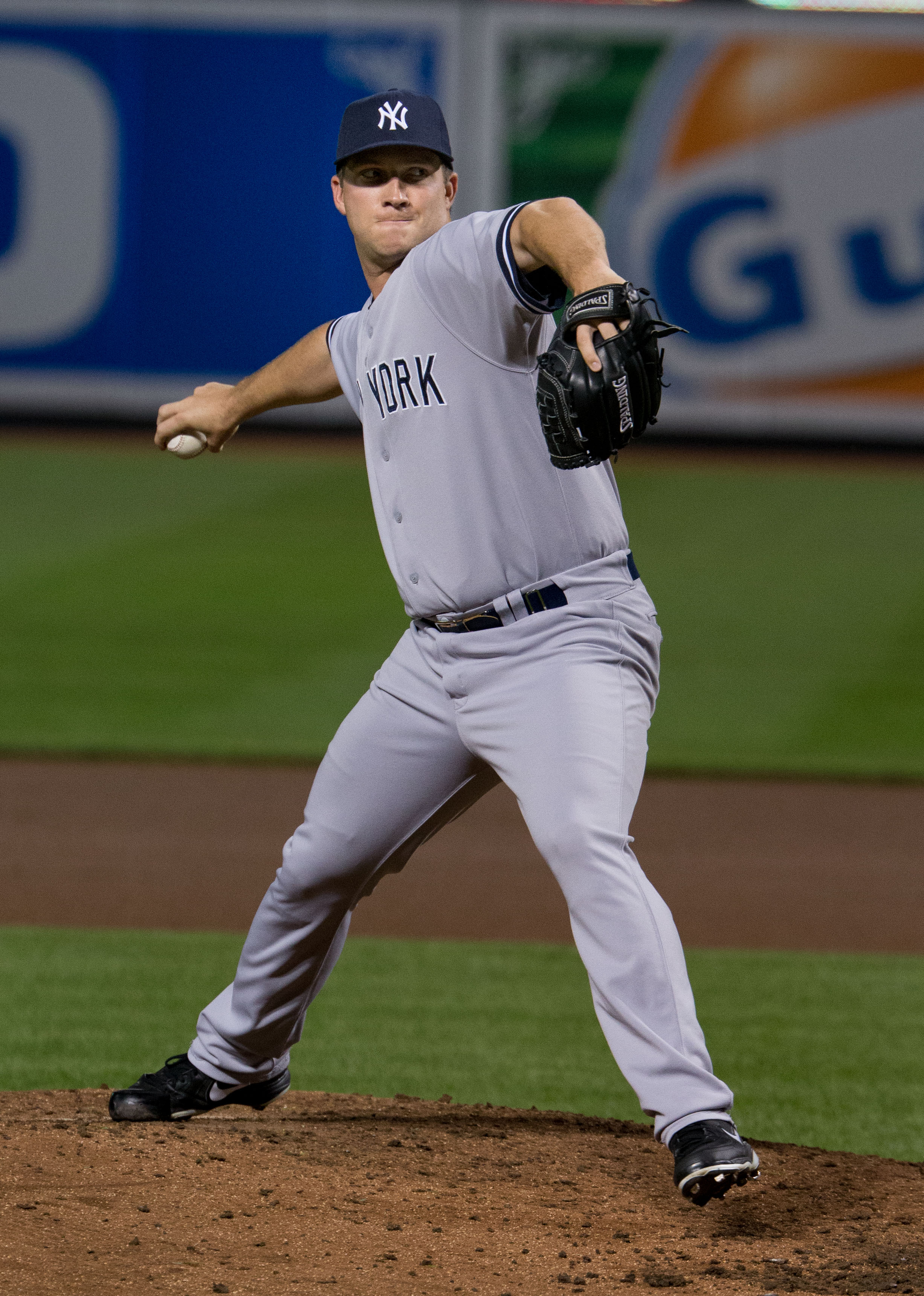
- Warren with the New York Yankees
- Pitcher
- Born: August 25, 1987 (age 39); Birmingham, Alabama, U.S.
- Batted: Right Threw: Right

MLB debut
- June 29, 2012, for the New York Yankees

Last MLB appearance
- June 7, 2019, for the San Diego Padres

MLB statistics
- Win–loss record: 30–24
- Earned run average: 3.53
- Strikeouts: 428
- Stats at Baseball Reference

Teams
- New York Yankees (2012–2015); Chicago Cubs (2016); New York Yankees (2016–2018); Seattle Mariners (2018); San Diego Padres (2019)

Adam Parrish Warren (born August 25, 1987) is an American former professional baseball pitcher. He played in Major League Baseball (MLB) for the New York Yankees, Chicago Cubs, Seattle Mariners and San Diego Padres. Before beginning his professional career, Warren pitched in college baseball for the North Carolina Tar Heels.

== Early life ==
Warren was raised in New Bern, North Carolina. His father played college football at North Carolina State University.

== College career ==
Warren attended New Bern High School and the University of North Carolina, where he played college baseball for the North Carolina Tar Heels baseball team in the Atlantic Coast Conference (ACC). As a sophomore, in 2007, Warren had a 12–0 win–loss record with a 2.17 earned run average (ERA) in 15 appearances. He took classes in the Kenan-Flagler Business School, and was named to the All-ACC Academic Honor Roll in consecutive seasons.

In the summer of 2007, Warren played collegiate summer baseball in the Cape Cod Baseball League for the Brewster Whitecaps, and in 2008 he returned to join the league's Chatham A's. As a junior, he pitched to a 9–2 record with a 4.23 ERA in 18 games started.

Warren was drafted by the Cleveland Indians in the 36th round of the 2008 Major League Baseball draft, but he did not sign, instead returning to UNC for his senior season. He was also named to ESPN's Academic All-America Third Team in 2009. He graduated with a 3.36 grade point average. Warren was also a finalist for the Lowe's Senior CLASS Award.

== Professional career ==
=== New York Yankees ===
After Warren's senior season, Warren was drafted in the fourth round of the 2009 Major League Baseball draft by the New York Yankees, with the 136th overall selection. Warren signed with the Yankees, and made his professional debut that season with the Staten Island Yankees of the Class A-Short Season New York–Penn League.

Warren started the 2010 season with the Tampa Yankees of the Class A-Advanced Florida State League, where he went 7–5 with a 2.22 ERA in 15 starts, before he was promoted to the Trenton Thunder of the Class AA Eastern League. On August 17, 2010, while pitching for the Thunder, Warren set a franchise record by striking out 15 batters in one game. He was named the Eastern League Pitcher of the Week for the performance. In 2011, pitching for the Scranton/Wilkes-Barre Yankees of the Class AAA International League, Warren was named to the 24th Triple-A All-Star Game.

Warren made his major-league debut for the Yankees on June 29, 2012, replacing an injured CC Sabathia in the Yankees' starting rotation. Warren gave up 6 runs in 2 1/3 innings in his first start versus the Chicago White Sox, highlighted by a Gordon Beckham two-run double in the top of the 2nd inning and a solo home run to Paul Konerko to lead off the top of the 3rd inning. He was relieved by David Phelps in the top of the 3rd, and would receive a no-decision as the Yankees lost the game 14–7. He was sent back down to Triple-A the very next day. Warren was called up to the Yankees on September 1, 2012, when the big league rosters expanded.

On May 13, 2013, Warren got his first career save after pitching four scoreless innings of relief in a 7–0 win against the Cleveland Indians. He was optioned to Triple-A on June 14, 2013, after throwing six scoreless innings in the Yankees' 3–2 18-inning loss against the Oakland Athletics on the previous day. He returned just four days later when Mark Teixeira went on the Disabled List. Warren appeared in 34 games, including 2 starts, pitching to a 3.39 ERA and 64 strikeouts in 77 innings.

During the 2014 season, Warren emerged as a key part of the Yankees bullpen, pitching 78 2/3 innings in 69 games over the course of the season. He recorded a 2.97 ERA and 1.11 WHIP, along with three saves.

Despite pitching in the bullpen through most of the previous two seasons, Adam Warren began the 2015 season in the Yankees' starting rotation. Warren pitched well as a starter, attaining a 5–5 record with a 3.59 ERA over 82.2 innings (14 starts) and striking out 54. On June 29, he was moved back to the bullpen when Iván Nova returned from the DL. Warren earned his first save of the season on July 28, when he pitched three perfect innings to end the Yankees' 21–5 win over the Texas Rangers. Warren was inserted back into the rotation on September 15 following Nathan Eovaldi's season-ending shoulder injury, where he made three more starts to end the season. Warren ended 2014 pitching 131 1/3 innings, the most in his career, with a 7–7 record, 3.29 ERA and 104 strikeouts.

=== Chicago Cubs ===
On December 8, 2015, the Yankees traded Warren and a player to be named later (Brendan Ryan) to the Chicago Cubs for Starlin Castro. Warren was sent down to Triple-A on June 21, 2016, in order to get stretched out as a starter. He made his lone start of the season on July 6, when he allowed one earned run and struck out six. On July 24, Warren was optioned to the Triple-A Iowa Cubs after posting a 5.91 ERA during the season in 29 games.

=== New York Yankees (second stint) ===
On July 25, the Cubs traded Warren back to the Yankees along with Billy McKinney, Gleyber Torres, and Rashad Crawford for Aroldis Chapman. With the Yankees, Warren had a 3.26 ERA in 29 appearances. For the 2016 season as a whole, Warren pitched to a 7–4 record and a 4.68 ERA, striking out 52 batters in 65 1/3 innings.

Warren was placed on the 10-day disabled list for the first time in his career on June 16, 2017, with right shoulder inflammation. He was activated on July 4.

=== Seattle Mariners ===
On July 30, 2018, the Yankees traded Warren to the Seattle Mariners for international signing bonus pool space. He became a free agent following the season.

=== San Diego Padres ===
On March 1, 2019, Warren signed a one-year contract with the San Diego Padres. The deal included a club option for 2020. Warren spent the majority of the season on the disabled list, being limited to just 25 appearances. He was 4-1 with an ERA of 5.34 in 28 2/3 innings. After suffering a forearm strain in June, Warren underwent Tommy John surgery in September 2019. He became a free agent following the season.

=== New York Yankees (third stint) ===
On December 18, 2019, Warren inked a minor league contract with the New York Yankees. This marked his third tenure with the team. Warren did not play in a game in 2020 due to his recovery from Tommy John and the cancellation of the minor league season because of the COVID-19 pandemic. On July 17, 2020, the Yankees released Warren from his contract.

On December 15, 2020, Warren signed another minor league contract with the New York Yankees. In 2021, Warren made 38 appearances for the Triple-A Scranton/Wilkes-Barre RailRiders, logging a 4-4 record and 3.59 ERA with 60 strikeouts in 57.2 innings pitched. He elected free agency on November 7, 2021.

On January 19, 2023, after spending the 2022 season out of baseball, Warren announced his retirement from playing, stating that he would be open to coaching opportunities down the road.

== Scouting report ==
Warren's fastball averages between 92 and 94 miles per hour (148–151 km/h). He often features a hard slider and a changeup.

== Personal life ==
Warren is married to his wife, Kristen. They reside in Riverview, Florida.
